= Zona Franca station =

Metro station in Barcelona, Spain

Zona Franca
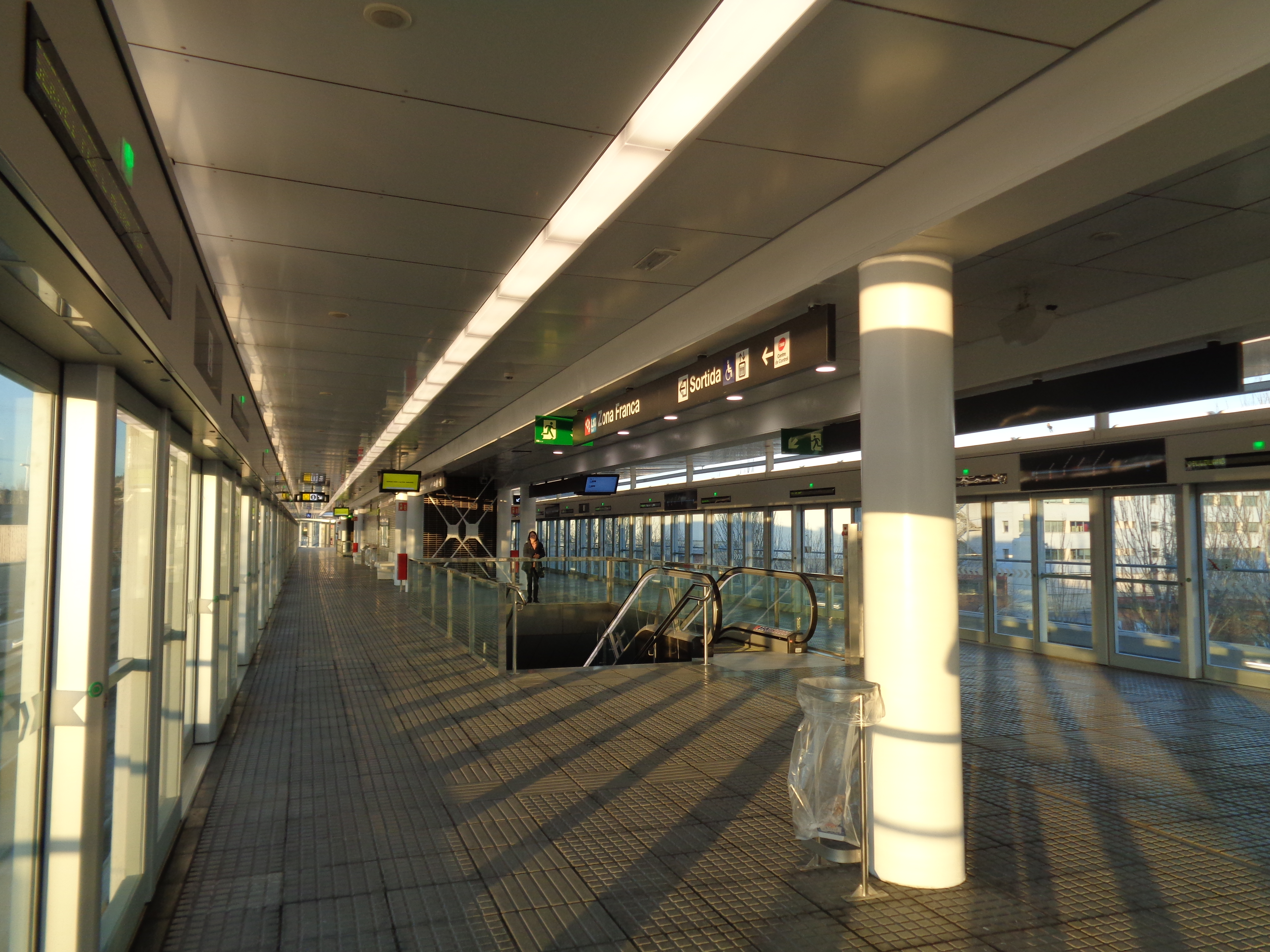
- Zona Franca station

General information
- Location: Carrer A, Sants-Montjuïc, Barcelona
- Coordinates: 41°20′35″N 2°08′42″E
- System: Barcelona Metro rapid transit station
- Owner: Transports Metropolitans de Barcelona
- Line: L10 Sud
- Platforms: 1 island platform
- Tracks: 2

Other information
- Fare zone: 1 (ATM)

History
- Opened: 1 February 2020

Passengers
- 2024: 186,522

Services
| Preceding station | Metro | Following station |
|---|---|---|
| Port Comercial│La Factoria towards ZAL | Riu Vell | L10 Sud | Foc towards Collblanc |
Projected
| Port Comercial│La Factoria towards Polígon Pratenc | L10 | Motors towards Gorg |
Location
- Location within Spain

Zona Franca (Catalan pronunciation: [ˈzonə ˈfɾaŋkə]) is a Barcelona Metro station located in the Zona Franca neighbourhood of the Barcelona municipality, served by line L10. Until the opening of the Zona Franca-ZAL | Riu Vell section on 7 November 2021, the station was the southern terminus of the Line 10 Sud. In 2024, it was the fourth least used station of the Barcelona Metro network with 186,522 users.
