= Port Comercial/La Factoria station =

Metro station in Barcelona, Spain

Port Comercial | La Factoria
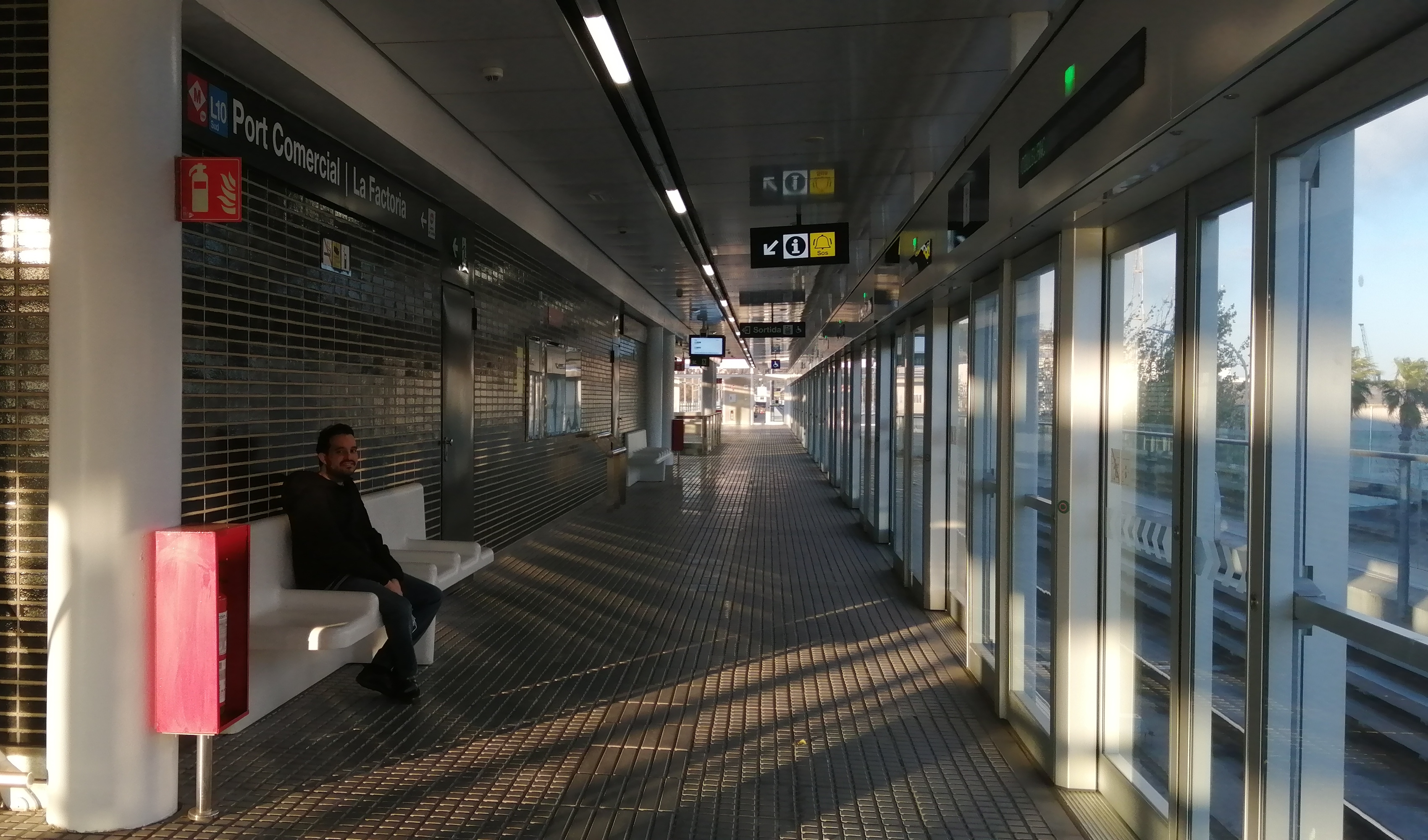
- Port Comercial│La Factoria station

General information
- Location: Carrer A, Sants-Montjuïc, Barcelona
- Coordinates: type:landmark source:kolossus-nlwiki 41°20′12″N 2°08′28″E
- System: Barcelona Metro rapid transit station
- Owner: Transports Metropolitans de Barcelona
- Line: L10 Sud
- Platforms: 1 island platform
- Tracks: 2

Other information
- Fare zone: 1 (ATM)

History
- Opened: 7 November 2021

Services
| Preceding station | Metro | Following station |
|---|---|---|
| Ecoparc towards ZAL | Riu Vell | L10 Sud | Zona Franca towards Collblanc |
Projected
| Ecoparc towards Polígon Pratenc | L10 | Zona Franca towards Gorg |
Location
- Location within Spain

Port Comercial | La Factoria (Catalan pronunciation: [ˈpɔrt kumərsiˈal lə fəktuˈɾi.ə]) is a Barcelona Metro station located in the Zona Franca neighbourhood of the Barcelona municipality, served by line L10. In 2024, it was the second least used station of the Barcelona Metro network with 116,382 users.
