= Can Tries/Gornal station =

Metro station in Barcelona, Spain

Can Tries | Gornal
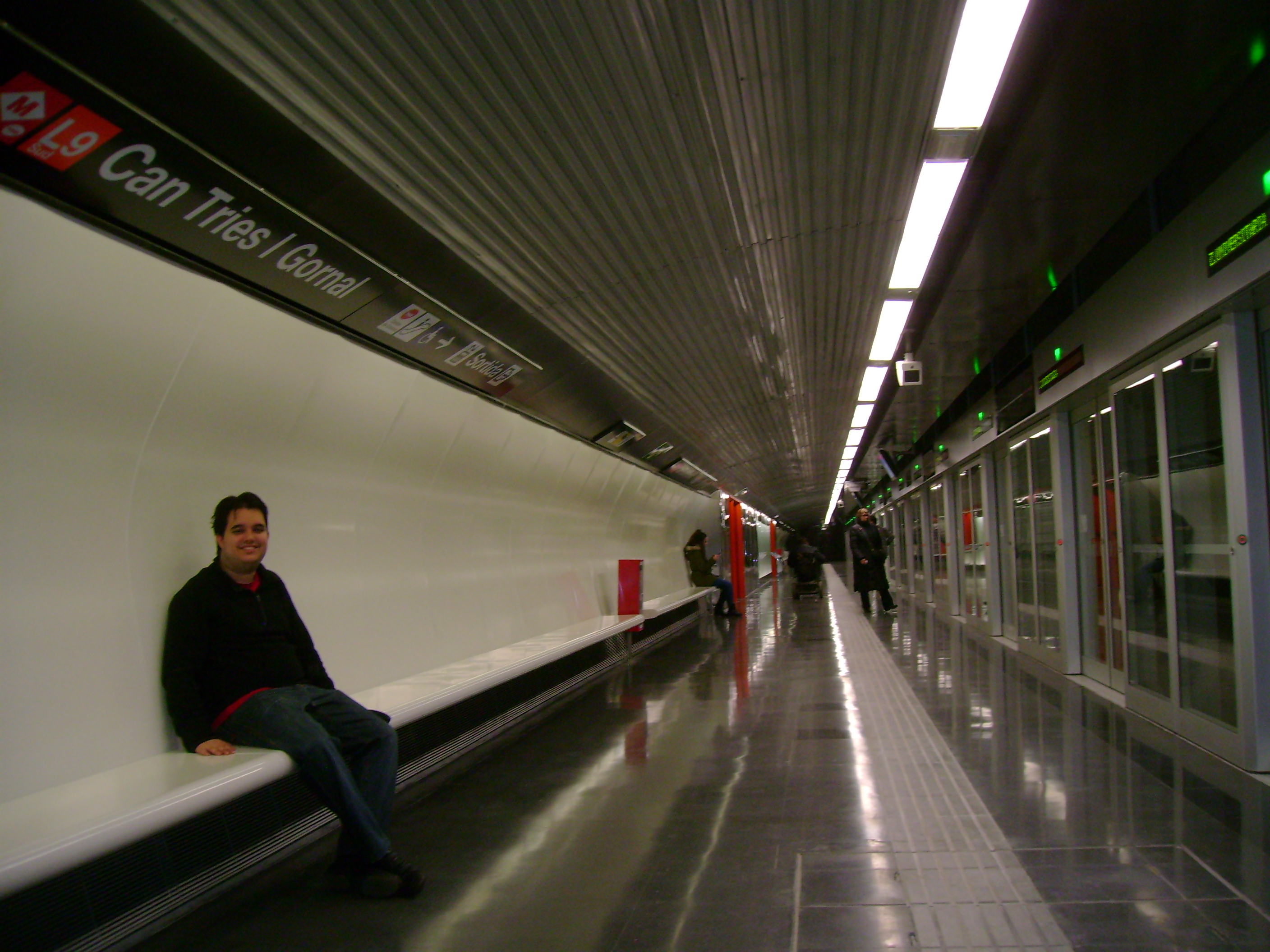
- Can Tries Gornal lowest platform

General information
- Location: L'Hospitalet de Llobregat
- Coordinates: 41°21′39″N 2°07′05″E
- System: Barcelona Metro rapid transit station
- Owner: Transports Metropolitans de Barcelona

Construction
- Structure type: Underground

Other information
- Fare zone: 1 (ATM)

History
- Opened: 2016

Services
Preceding station	Metro	Following station
Europa | Fira towards Aeroport T1	L9 Sud	Torrassa towards Zona Universitària
Provençana towards ZAL | Riu Vell	L10 Sud	Torrassa towards Collblanc
Location
- Location within Barcelona Location within Spain

Can Tries | Gornal (Catalan pronunciation: [ˈkan ˈtɾi.əz ɡurˈnal]) is a Barcelona Metro station, in the L'Hospitalet de Llobregat municipality of the Barcelona metropolitan area, and named after the nearby Gornal neighbourhood. The station is served by line L9 and line L10.

The station is located underneath the intersection of Carrer Can Tries and the carrer de Narcís de Monturiol. There is one entrance, from Carrer Can Tries, which serves a below ground ticket hall. The two 108-metre (354 ft) long side platforms are at a lower level.

The station was opened in 2016, at the time of the extension of line L9 from Zona Universitaria station to Airport T1 station.

Line 10 has served the station since 8 September 2018 with the opening of the section to Foc station.
