= Gornal =

Gornal may refer to the following places:

== India ==
- Gornal, Bidar, a settlement in the Bidar district of Karnataka
- Gornal, Bijapur, a settlement in Bijapur district, Karnataka

== Russia ==
- Gornal, Russia, a village in Sudzhansky District of Kursk Oblast

== Spain ==
- Gornal (L'Hospitalet de Llobregat), near Barcelona
  - Gornal (Barcelona Metro), station serving Gornal
  - Can Tries – Gornal (Barcelona Metro), station serving Gornal
- La Gornal, in Castellet i la Gornal, Catalonia

== United Kingdom ==
- Gornal, West Midlands, encompassing Upper Gornal, Lower Gornal and Gornal Wood; in Dudley, England
  - Gornal Athletic F.C., football team based in Lower Gornal
  - Gornal stone, a variety of limestone found in the area
