= Foneria station =

Metro station in Barcelona, Spain

Foneria
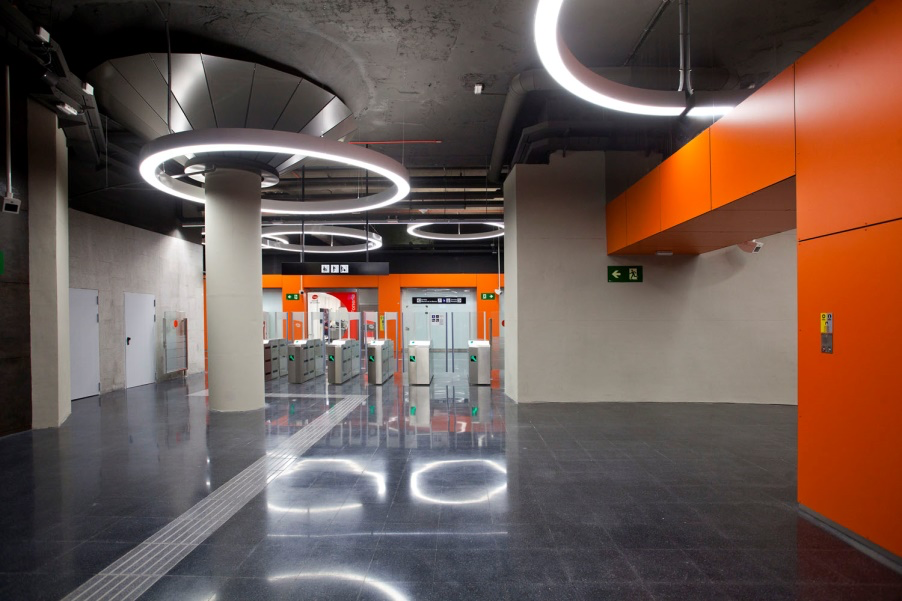
- Concourse

General information
- Location: Passeig de la Zona Franca with Carrer de Foneria, Barcelona
- Coordinates: 41°21′38″N 2°08′18″E
- System: Barcelona Metro rapid transit station
- Owner: Transports Metropolitans de Barcelona

Construction
- Structure type: Underground

Other information
- Fare zone: 1 (ATM)

History
- Opened: 2018

Services
Preceding station	Metro	Following station
Foc towards ZAL | Riu Vell	L10 Sud	Ciutat de la Justícia towards Collblanc
Location
- Location within Barcelona Location within Spain

Foneria (Catalan pronunciation: [funəˈɾi.ə]) is a Barcelona Metro station opened on 8 September 2018, operated by TMB. The metro station is located in Zona Franca, a neighborhood of the Barcelona municipality. The station serves line L10 and is located between Provençana and Foc stations in the southern part of the city. The station is located underneath the Passeig de la Zona Franca.

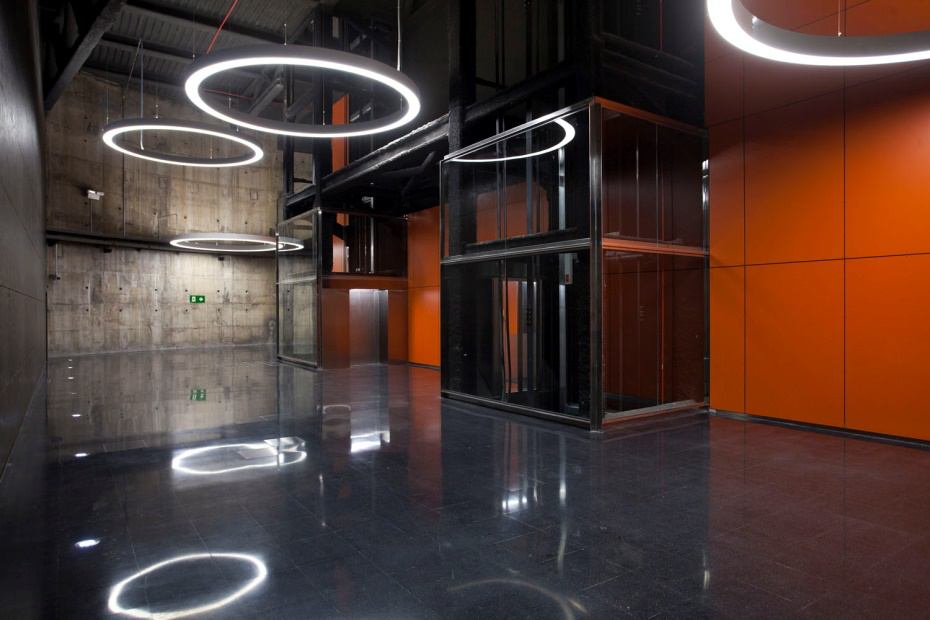
Elevators that connect platforms with the lobby

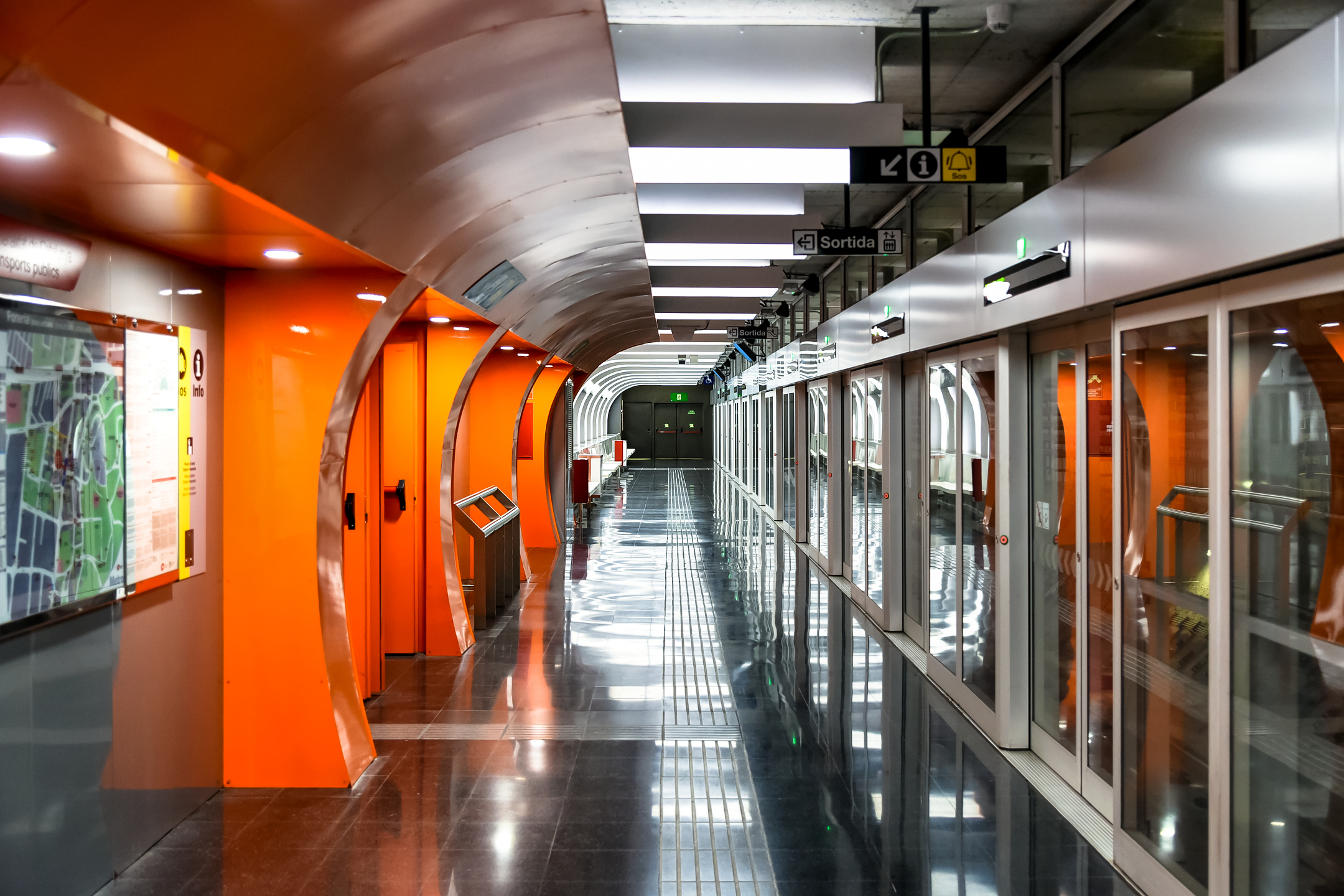
Platform
