= Provençana station =

Metro station in Barcelona, Spain

Provençana
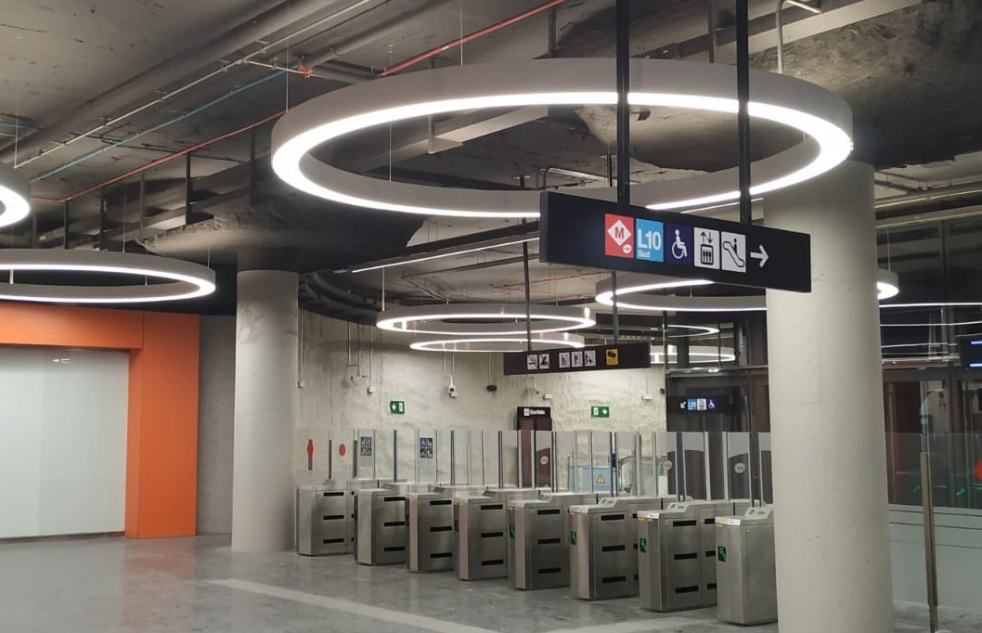
- Station vestibule

General information
- Location: Carrer de l'Aprestadora, L'Hospitalet de Llobregat, Barcelona; Spain
- Coordinates: 41°21′41″N 2°07′28″E
- System: Barcelona Metro rapid transit station
- Owner: Transports Metropolitans de Barcelona
- Line: L10 Sud

Construction
- Structure type: Underground

Other information
- Fare zone: 1 (ATM)

History
- Opened: 2019

Services
Preceding station	Metro	Following station
Ciutat de la Justícia towards ZAL | Riu Vell	L10 Sud	Can Tries | Gornal towards Collblanc
Location
- Location within Barcelona Location within Province of Barcelona Location within Spain

Provençana (Catalan pronunciation: [pɾuβənˈsanə]) is a Barcelona Metro station opened on 2 March 2019, operated by TMB. The metro station is located in L'Hospitalet de Llobregat. The station serves line L10 Sud and is located between Can Tries | Gornal and Foneria stations in the southern part of the metropolitan area. The station is located underneath Carrer de l'Aprestadora.
