= Ecoparc station =

Metro station in Barcelona, Spain

Ecoparc
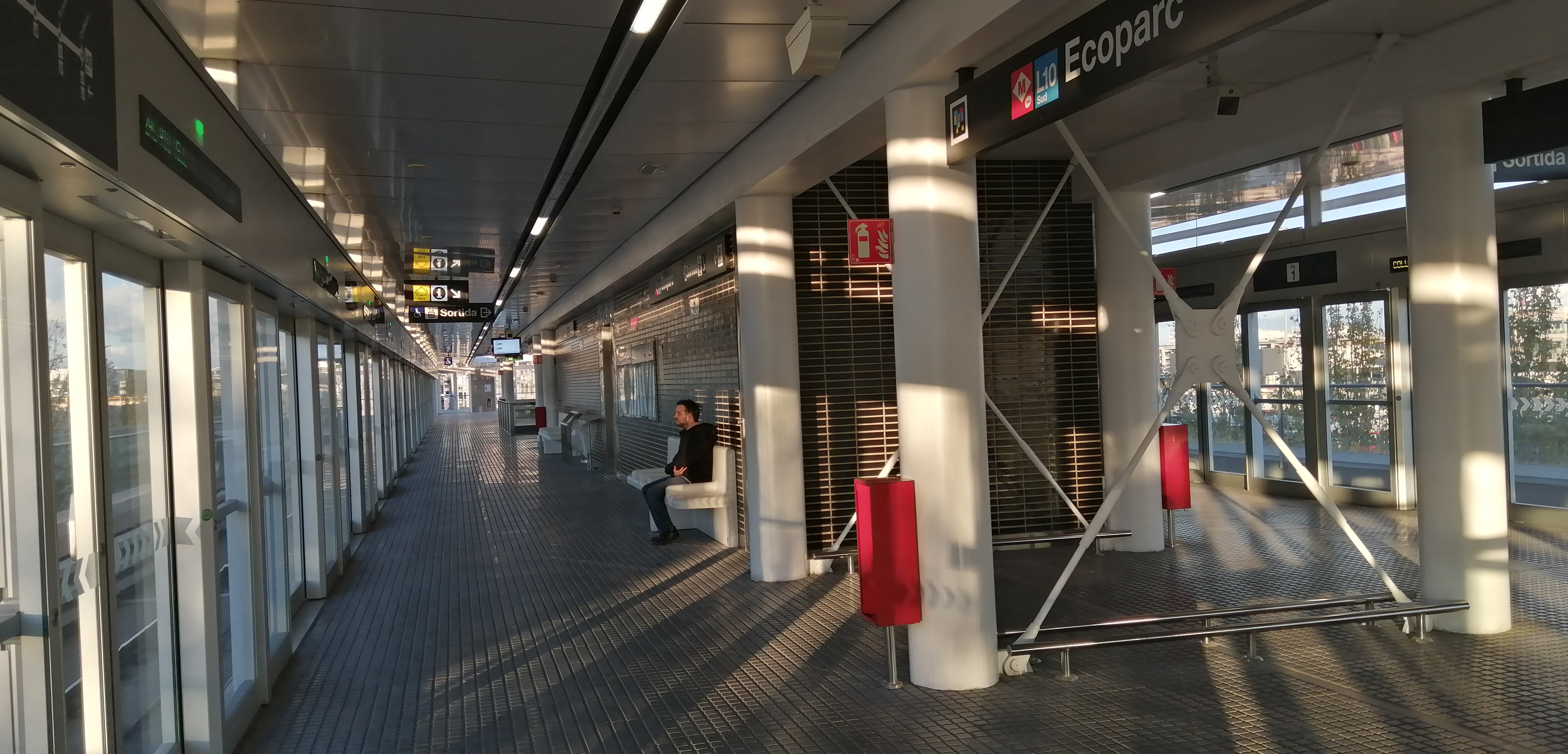
- Ecoparc station

General information
- Location: Carrer A, Sants-Montjuïc, Barcelona
- Coordinates: type:landmark source:kolossus-nlwiki 41°19′49″N 2°08′13″E
- System: Barcelona Metro rapid transit station
- Owner: Transports Metropolitans de Barcelona
- Line: L10 Sud
- Platforms: 1 island platform
- Tracks: 2

Other information
- Fare zone: 1 (ATM)

History
- Opened: 7 November 2021

Services
Preceding station	Metro	Following station
ZAL | Riu Vell Terminus	L10 Sud	Port Comercial│La Factoria towards Collblanc
Projected
ZAL | Riu Vell towards Polígon Pratenc	L10	Port Comercial│La Factoria towards Gorg
Location
- Location within Spain

Ecoparc (Catalan pronunciation: [ˌɛkuˈpark]) is a Barcelona Metro station located in the Zona Franca neighbourhood of the Barcelona municipality, served by line L10. In 2024, it was the third least used station of the Barcelona Metro network with 171,293 users.
