= Gornal (L'Hospitalet de Llobregat) =

El Gornal
- Neighbourhood of L'Hospitalet de Llobregat
- Interactive map of El Gornal
- Coordinates: 41°21′18″N 2°06′59″E
- Country: Spain
- Autonomous Community: Catalonia
- Province: Barcelona
- Comarca: Barcelonès
- Municipality: L'Hospitalet de Llobregat
- District: District VI

Area
  - Total: 0.42 km^{2} (0.16 sq mi)

Population (2016)
  - Total: 6,931
  - Density: 17,000/km^{2} (43,000/sq mi)

El Gornal, or simply Gornal, is a neighbourhood in L'Hospitalet de Llobregat, belonging to the metropolitan area of Barcelona. It's part of District VI of L'Hospitalet, along with Bellvitge. Its creation started with the urban expansion of Bellvitge into empty terrains around Renfe railtracks. From the 1970s on it has been growing extensively, with the introduction of apartment blocks destined for low-income people.

In 1991, the Civic Center was opened, and commercial galleries (Mercat de Gornal) in 1994. Also commenced in 1994 was the third phase of housing, which was completed in 1997. This phase joined the district to the rest of the city and not remain so isolated, with a communal square created called Gornal. In 1999, the Hotel Entities opened (which was closed in 2010).

In January 2000, the commission affected by block designed by architect Ricardo Bofill estimated at 400 million pesetas, the amount in compensation for the damage to the houses. 2002 was the beginning of urban transformation of Granvía between Plaza Cerdà and Gornal. From 2006, major changes were carried out to improve the neighborhood and the rest of the city, including infrastructure works that have overlap between them: the collector of water that crosses the entire neighborhood in to centralized sewerage, remodeling Granvía, the excavation of the routes for the AVE (high speed train). On October 20th, 2007, a sinkhole due to construction of the AVE paralyzed commuter lines and Catalan railways. Residents suffered from dust, mud, widespread fences and no place to park cars, so many chose to leave on sidewalks and gardens.

Today, the neighborhood has been transformed. Vilanova Avenue has a large parking area, Av Granvía a landscaped promenade along its length and bike path, and the Rambla remodeling Carmen Amaya and square in Europe. El Gornal has improved and now has as many barriers had in his day. In its vicinity are the market town and several hotels. The tunnel was repaired on January 2008. A third gateway that communicates with Gornal Vilanova del av Bellvitge America is built. It is currently finishing the new tiling Rambla Carmen Amaya and some changes in the green areas.

== Transport ==
- Bellvitge - Rodalies de Catalunya line R2 (the railway line forms the border between Gornal and Bellvitge)
- Can Tries - Gornal - Barcelona Metro lines 9 and 10
- Gornal - Barcelona Metro line 8 and FGC Llobregat–Anoia Line
- Buses LH1 and LH2 serve the district, while many buses run along Av. Gran Via (at the southern boundary of the district), including the 46, 65 and H12.
