= Foc station =

Metro station in Barcelona, Spain

Foc
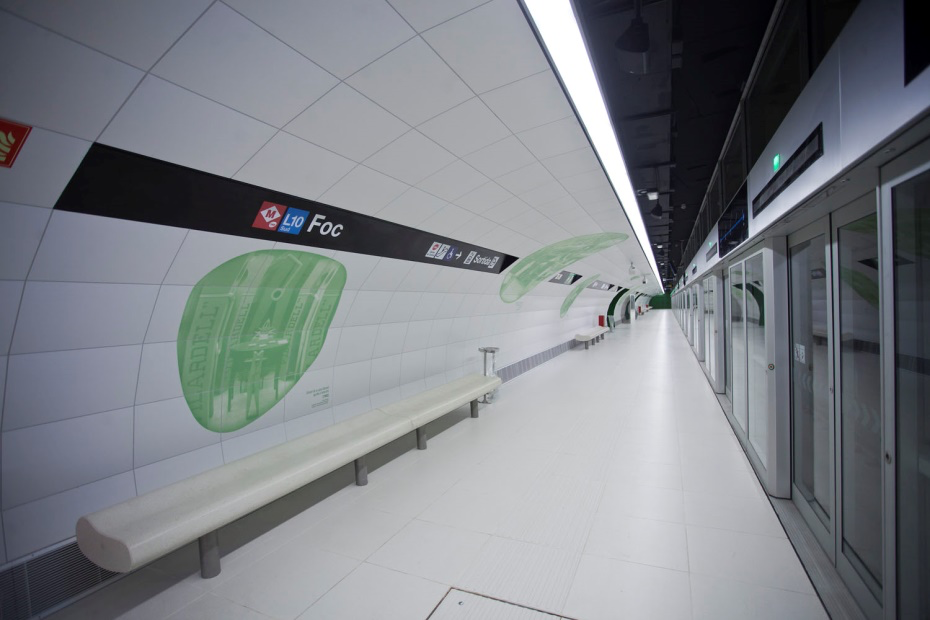
- Upper platform of the station

General information
- Location: Passeig de la Zona Franca with Carrer del Foc, Barcelona
- Coordinates: 41°21′22″N 2°08′30″E
- System: Barcelona Metro rapid transit station
- Owner: Transports Metropolitans de Barcelona

Construction
- Structure type: Underground

Other information
- Fare zone: 1 (ATM)

History
- Opened: 8 September 2018

Services
Preceding station	Metro	Following station
Zona Franca towards ZAL | Riu Vell	L10 Sud	Foneria towards Collblanc
Projected
Fira towards Airport T1	L2	INEFC towards Badalona Pompeu Fabra
Motors towards Polígon Pratenc	L10	Foneria towards Gorg
Location
- Location within Barcelona Location within Spain

Foc (Catalan pronunciation: [fɔk]) is a Barcelona Metro station located in the Zona Franca neighborhood of the Barcelona municipality, served by line L10.

The station is located underneath the Passeig de la Zona Franca.

The station opened on 8 September 2018, when line L10 opened from Collblanc station to this station, as a terminal, until February 2020 and the opening of Zona Franca station.

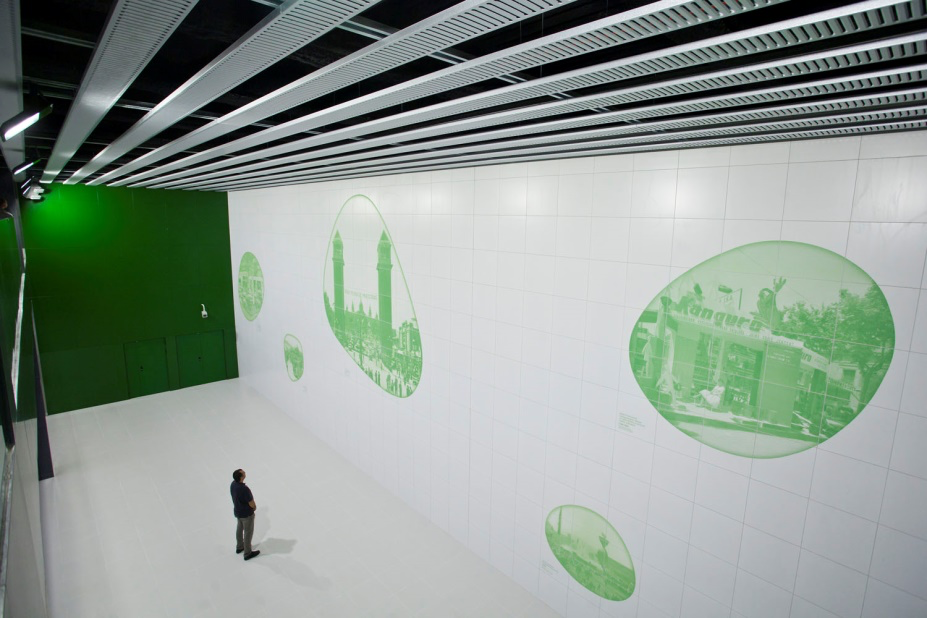
Exhibition room located between lobby and platforms
