= Zona Franca – Port =

Coordinates: 41°20′12″N 2°07′49″E

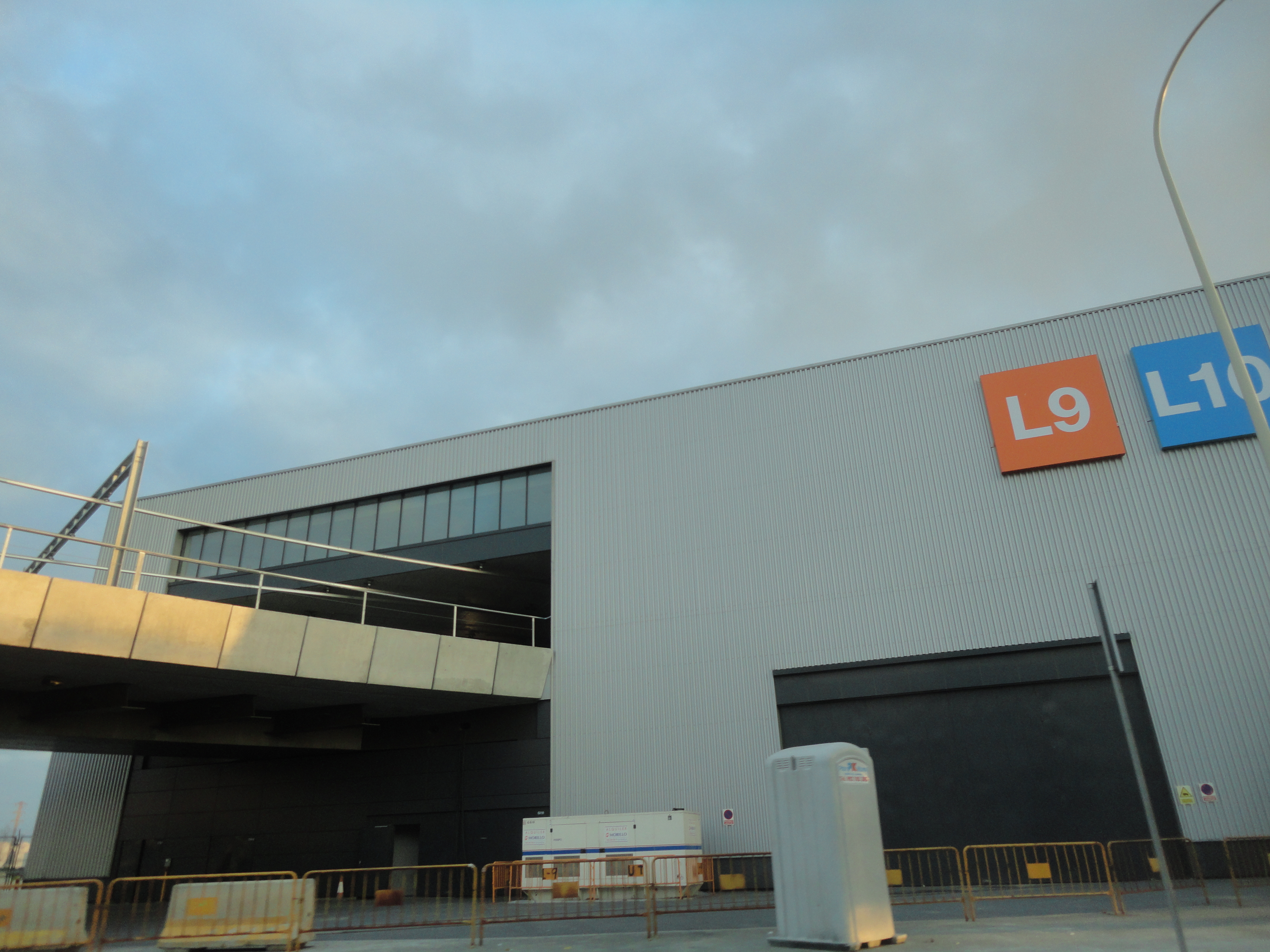
Parking lots for L9 and L10 in the Zona Franca.

Zona Franca – Port (Catalan pronunciation: [ˈzonə ˈfɾaŋkə ˈpɔrt]) is an area of Barcelona (Catalonia) in the district of Sants-Montjuïc. The area includes the Polígon Industrial de la Zona Franca and the Port of Barcelona.

It is in the south of Barcelona and south-east of l'Hospitalet de Llobregat.

== See also ==
- Zona Franca (Barcelona)
