= Barcelona Metro line 10 =

Rapid transit line in Barcelona, Spain

Coordinates: 41°26′27″N 2°14′02″E

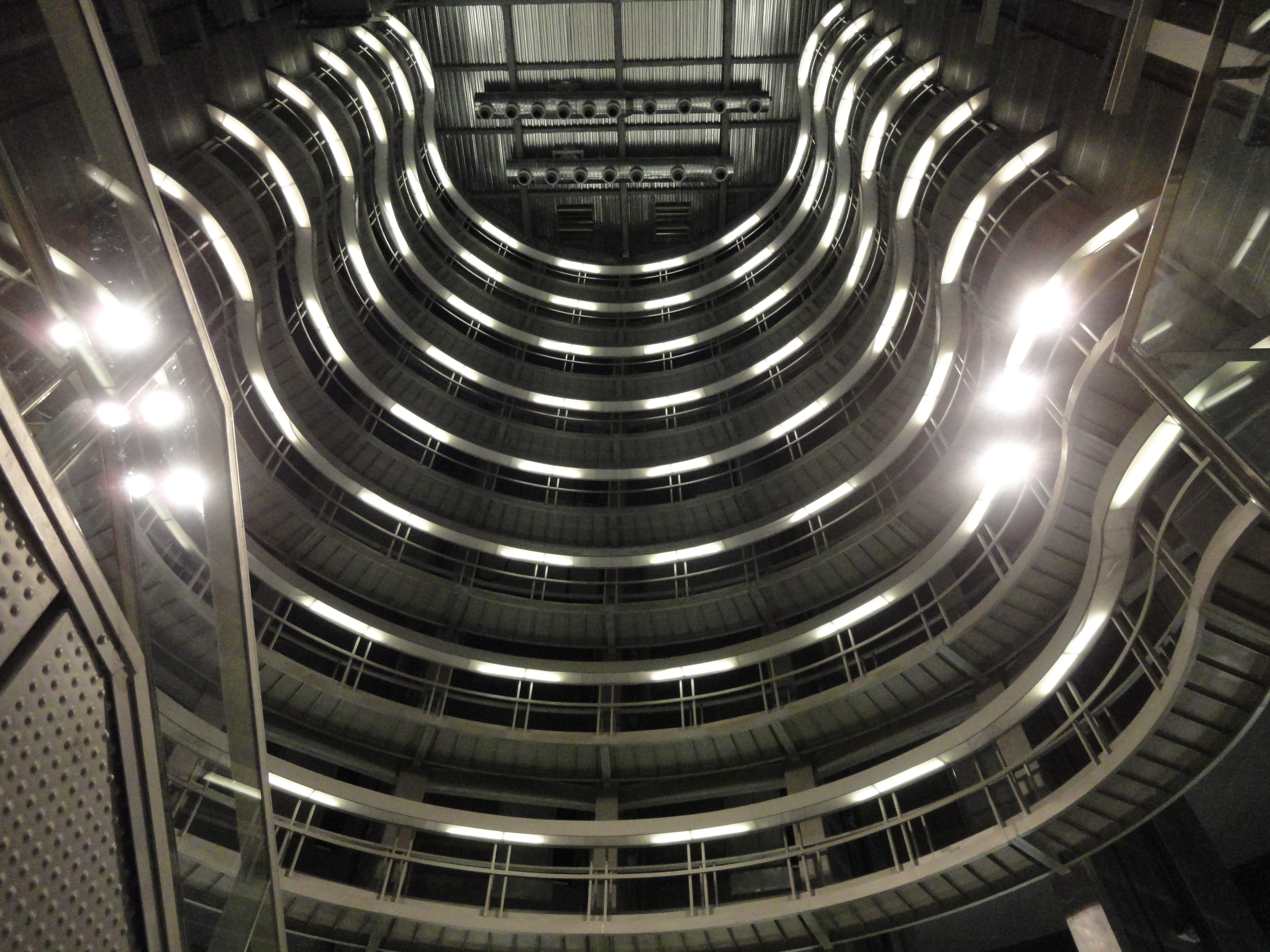
- Elevator hall at Llefià

Overview
- Service type: Rapid transit
- System: Barcelona Metro
- Status: Operational
- Locale: Barcelona metropolitan area
- First service: 2010; 16 years ago
- Current operator: TMB

Route
- Termini: Gorg; ZAL│Riu Vell
- Stops: 17 (in operation); 31 (planned)
- Distance travelled: 13.9 km (8.6 mi) (in operation)

Technical
- Rolling stock: 9000 series
- Track gauge: 1,435 mm (4 ft 8 1/2 in)
- Electrification: 1,500 V DC rigid overhead wire
- Track owner: TMB

Line 10 (Línia 10 in Catalan; [ˈlini.ə dɛw]) is a rapid transit line of the Barcelona Metro network. A fully-automated line, it started operation on April 18, 2010. Part of the line is still under construction, with 17 stations currently in operation in Barcelona, Badalona and L'Hospitalet de Llobregat. The line is currently operated as two disconnected branches; the ZAL│Riu Vell – Collblanc section is known as L10 South (L10 Sud in Catalan) while the La Sagrera – Gorg portion is known as L10 North (L10 Nord in Catalan). The line's missing central section, expected to be completed by 2030, shares a significant portion of its tracks with Line 9.

== Overview ==
The line will link the Zona Franca with Badalona, through Barcelona proper, sharing most of the area covered by L9. L9/10 will be the deepest and longest line in the network. Originally expected to be ready by 2008, ongoing problems with its construction have delayed its completion.

The line is currently operated in two sections, North and South, similarly to line 9.

=== Northern section ===
The section from Gorg to Bon Pastor opened on 18 April 2010, and the section from La Sagrera to Bon Pastor (except Sagrera | TAV station) opened 26 June 2010. This section is operated as L10 Nord.

=== Southern section ===
On 8 September 2018 the section between Foc station and the junction with the main route of line 9 at Can Tries Gornal opened to the public, with the exception of the stations Ciutat de la Justícia and Provençana. The opening of these two stations was deferred to 2019, with the rest of the line on the viaduct through the Zona Franca proper opening between 2020 and 2025. Trains on this section operate between Zona Franca and Collblanc stations, as the line from Collblanc to Zona Universitària is single track and does not have sufficient capacity for both L9 and L10 to run. This section is operated as L10 Sud.

Provençana station opened to the public on 2 March 2019 followed by Ciutat de la Justícia on 24 November 2019. The section between Foc and Zona Franca, with the exception of the Motors station, opened on 1 February 2020. On 7 November 2021, the section from Zona Franca to ZAL - Riu Vell opened to the public.

== Stations ==
=== L10 Nord ===
Station	Image	Location	Opened	Interchanges
Gorg		Badalona (Gorg)	18 April 2010	Barcelona Metro Barcelona Metro line 2 Trambesòs
La Salut		Badalona	18 April 2010	
Llefià		Badalona	18 April 2010	
Bon Pastor		Barcelona (Bon Pastor)	18 April 2010	Barcelona Metro Barcelona Metro line 9
Onze de Setembre		Barcelona (Sant Andreu de Palomar)	26 June 2010	Barcelona Metro Barcelona Metro line 9
La Sagrera		Barcelona (La Sagrera)	26 June 2010	Barcelona Metro Barcelona Metro line 1 Barcelona Metro line 5 Barcelona Metro line 9 Rodalies de Catalunya R3 (Rodalies de Catalunya) R4 (Rodalies de Catalunya)

=== L10 Sud ===
Station	Image	Location	Opened	Interchanges
Collblanc		L'Hospitalet	8 September 2018	Barcelona Metro Barcelona Metro line 5 Barcelona Metro line 9
Torrassa		L'Hospitalet	8 September 2018	Barcelona Metro Barcelona Metro line 1 Barcelona Metro line 9
Can Tries - Gornal		L'Hospitalet	8 September 2018	Barcelona Metro Barcelona Metro line 9
Provençana		L'Hospitalet	2 March 2019	
Ciutat de la Justícia		L'Hospitalet	23 November 2019	Ferrocarrils de la Generalitat de Catalunya Barcelona Metro line 8 Llobregat–Anoia Line
Foneria		Barcelona (Zona Franca)	8 September 2018	
Foc		Barcelona (Zona Franca)	8 September 2018	
Zona Franca		Barcelona (Zona Franca)	1 February 2020	
Port Comercial│La Factoria		Barcelona (Zona Franca)	7 November 2021	
Ecoparc		Barcelona (Zona Franca)	7 November 2021	
ZAL - Riu Vell		Barcelona (Zona Franca)	7 November 2021	
