= Zona Franca (Barcelona) =

Industrial area located in Barcelona, Spain

Coordinates: 41°20′0″N 2°8′19″E

Zona Franca (Catalan pronunciation: [ˈzonə ˈfɾaŋkə], also called in Catalan: Polígon Industrial de la Zona Franca; [puˈliɣun industɾiˈal də lə ˈzonə ˈfɾaŋkə]) is a logistics and industrial area located in the Sants-Montjuïc district of Barcelona, Catalonia, Spain. Together with the adjacent Port of Barcelona it forms the neighborhood Zona Franca – Port.

It is located in the Llobregat Delta between the Port of Barcelona and Barcelona Airport. The metro line L10 connects Zona Franca with central Barcelona and the rest of the metropolitan area since 2018.

The origins and the name of the area date back to an attempt to create a free port in Barcelona which ultimately failed in 1929. With Catalonia's industrialisation wave in the 1950s, the space was used to construct factories.

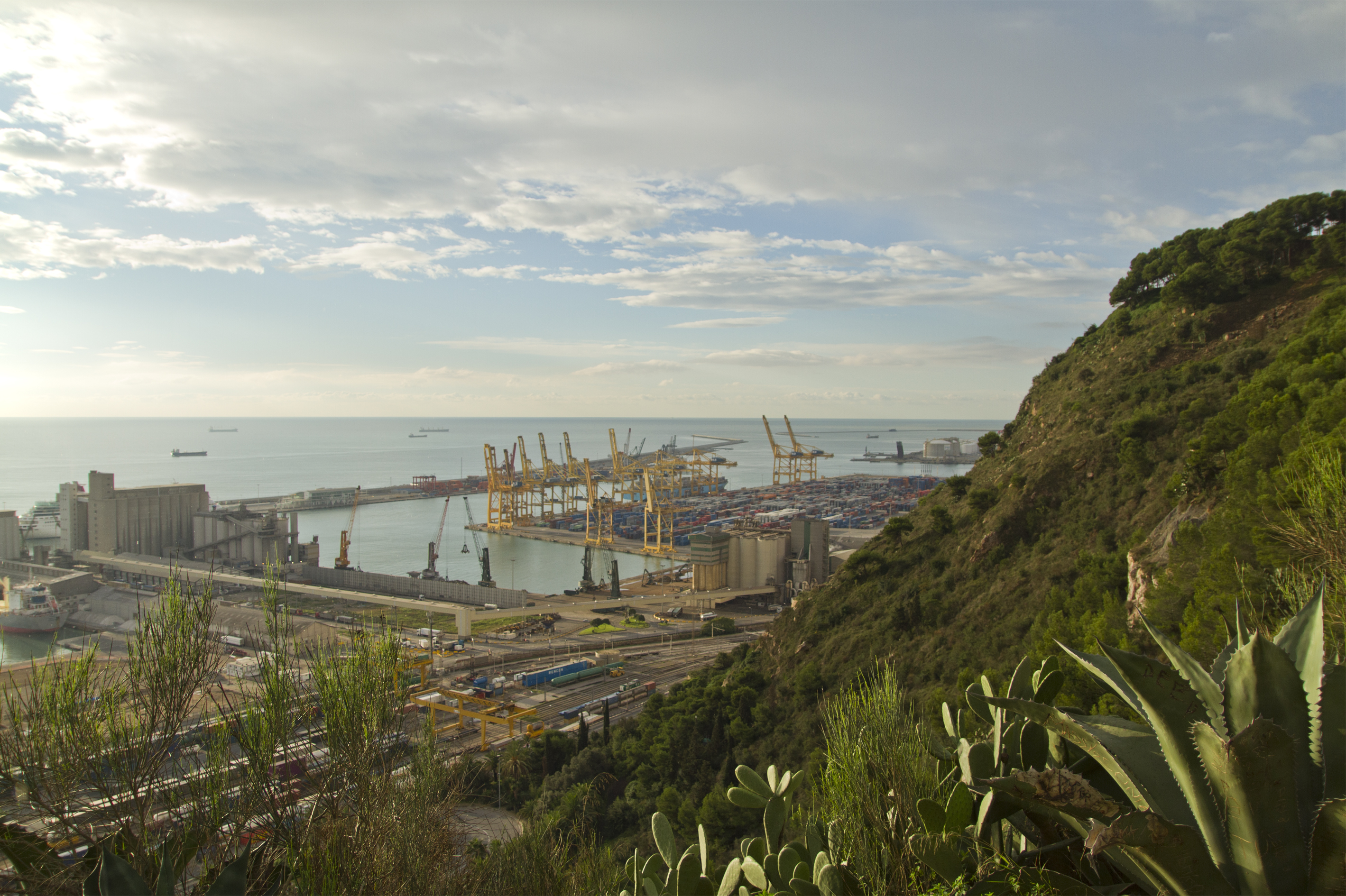
The Zona Franca

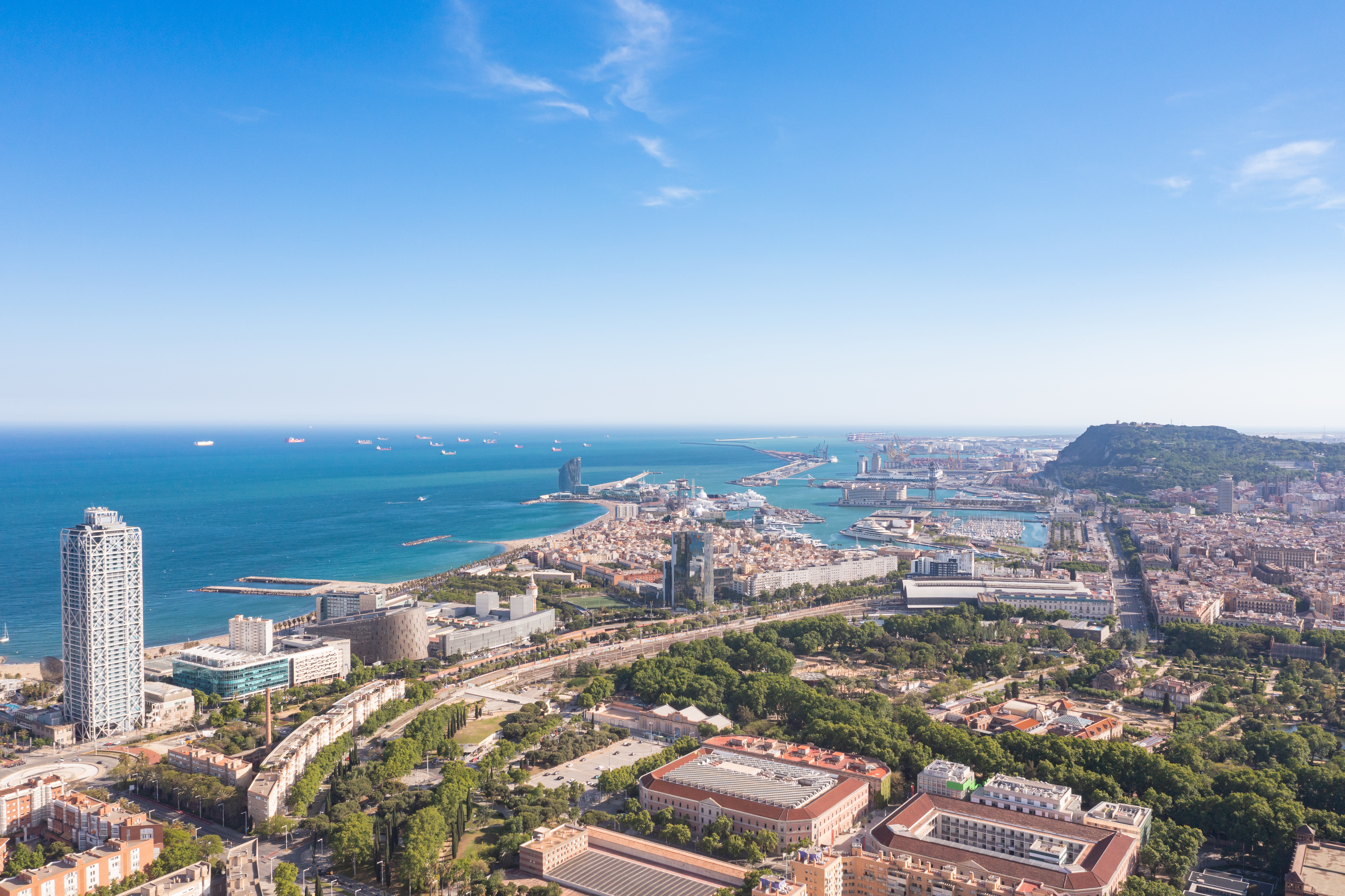
Aerial view of Zona Franca and the Port of Barcelona, Spain

== Main industries ==
Opened in 1953, the original SEAT, S.A. automotive industry factory and production line is located in Zona Franca. Following SEAT's acquisition by the German automotive giant Volkswagen Group, the plant no longer produces cars, but is instead now solely used as a press shop, stamping out metal body panels. It currently employs 1,269 people.

The area also has a Nissan Motors factory, which produces the Nissan Navara, the Nissan Pulsar and the Nissan NV200 (both electric and combustion engine versions). Nissan closed the plant in December 2021 and the plant was taken over by Chery.

The Mercabarna food-trading estate opened in the Zona Franca in 1971 with the transfer of the central fruit and vegetable market, which since 1921 had been in El Born. It was followed by the slaughterhouse in 1979, the central fish market in 1973 and the central flower market in 1974.

== See also ==
- Urban planning of Barcelona
