= ZAL/Riu Vell station =

Metro station in Barcelona, Spain

ZAL | Riu Vell
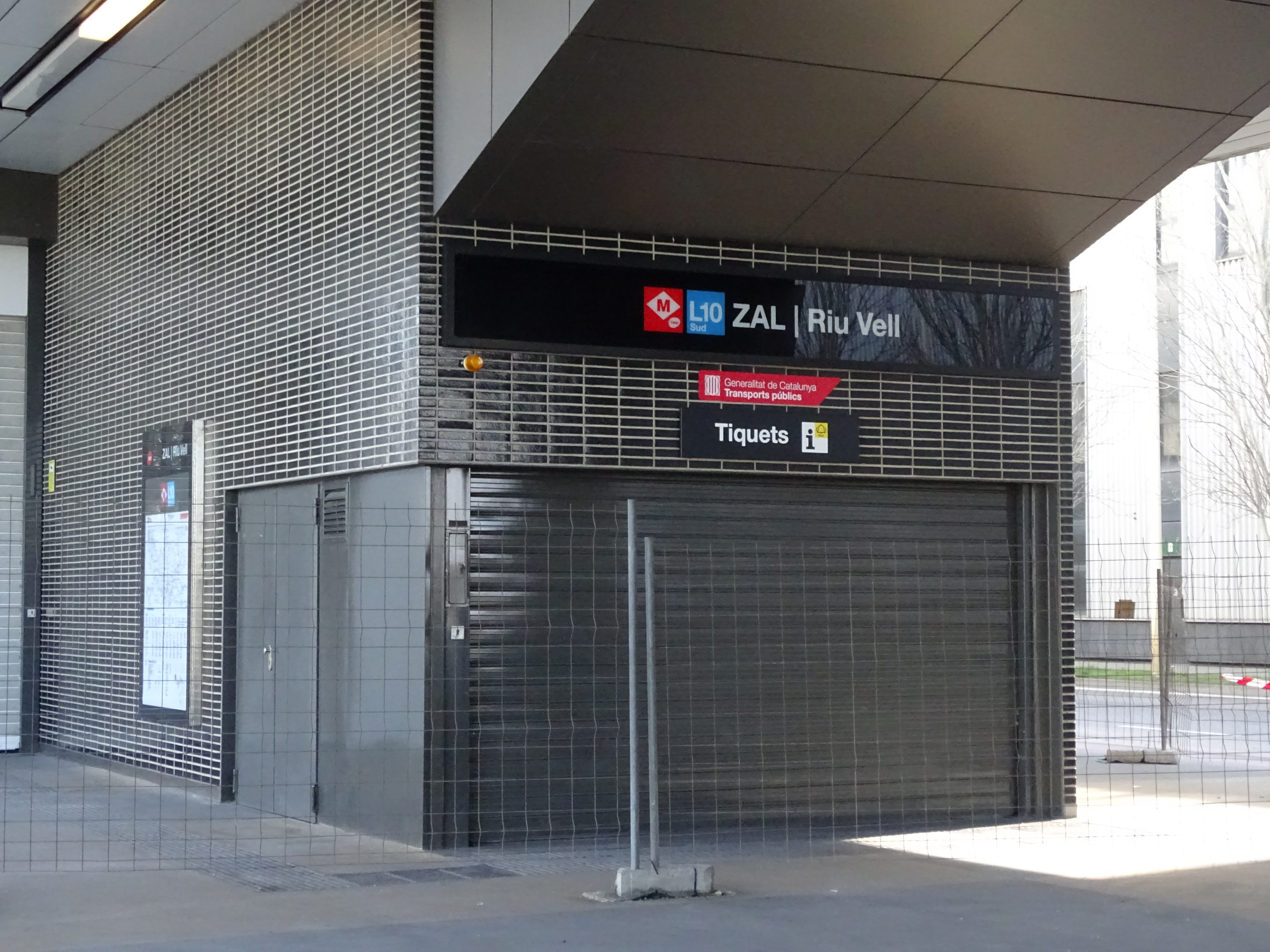
- ZAL-Riu Vell station

General information
- Location: Carrer A, Sants-Montjuïc, Barcelona
- Coordinates: 41°19′25″N 2°07′59″E
- System: Barcelona Metro rapid transit station
- Owner: Transports Metropolitans de Barcelona
- Line: L10 Sud
- Platforms: 1 island platform
- Tracks: 2

Other information
- Fare zone: 1 (ATM)

History
- Opened: 7 November 2021

Passengers
- 2024: 340,056

Services
Preceding station	Metro	Following station
Terminus	L10 Sud	Ecoparc towards Collblanc
Projected
Polígon Pratenc Terminus	L10	Ecoparc towards Gorg
Location
- Location within Spain

ZAL | Riu Vell (Catalan pronunciation: [ˈzal ˈriw ˈβeʎ]) is a Barcelona Metro station located in the Zona Franca neighbourhood of the Barcelona municipality, served by line L10. Since its opening, the station has been the southern terminus of Line 10 Sud.

The station name refers to the ZAL or Zona d'Activitats Logístiques (Zone of Logistical Activities), while Riu Vell (Old River) refers to the old bed of the Llobregat river which was diverted in 2004 in order to reduce the risk of flooding.

In 2024, it was the 8th least used station in the Barcelona Metro network according to official TMB data, with 340,056 passengers.
