= Barcelona Metro =

Rapid transit system in Barcelona, Catalonia, Spain

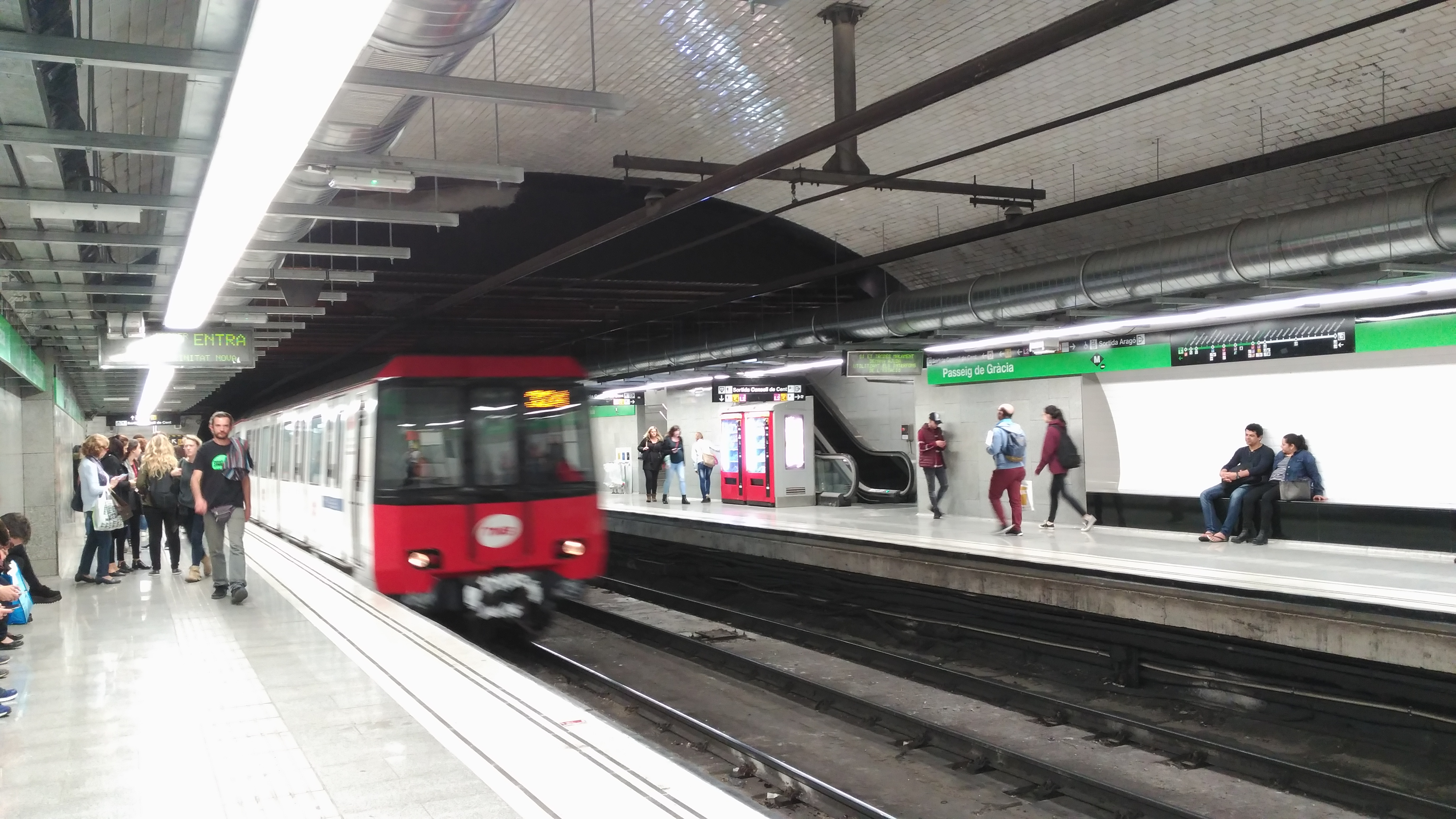
- TMB train at Passeig de Gràcia station

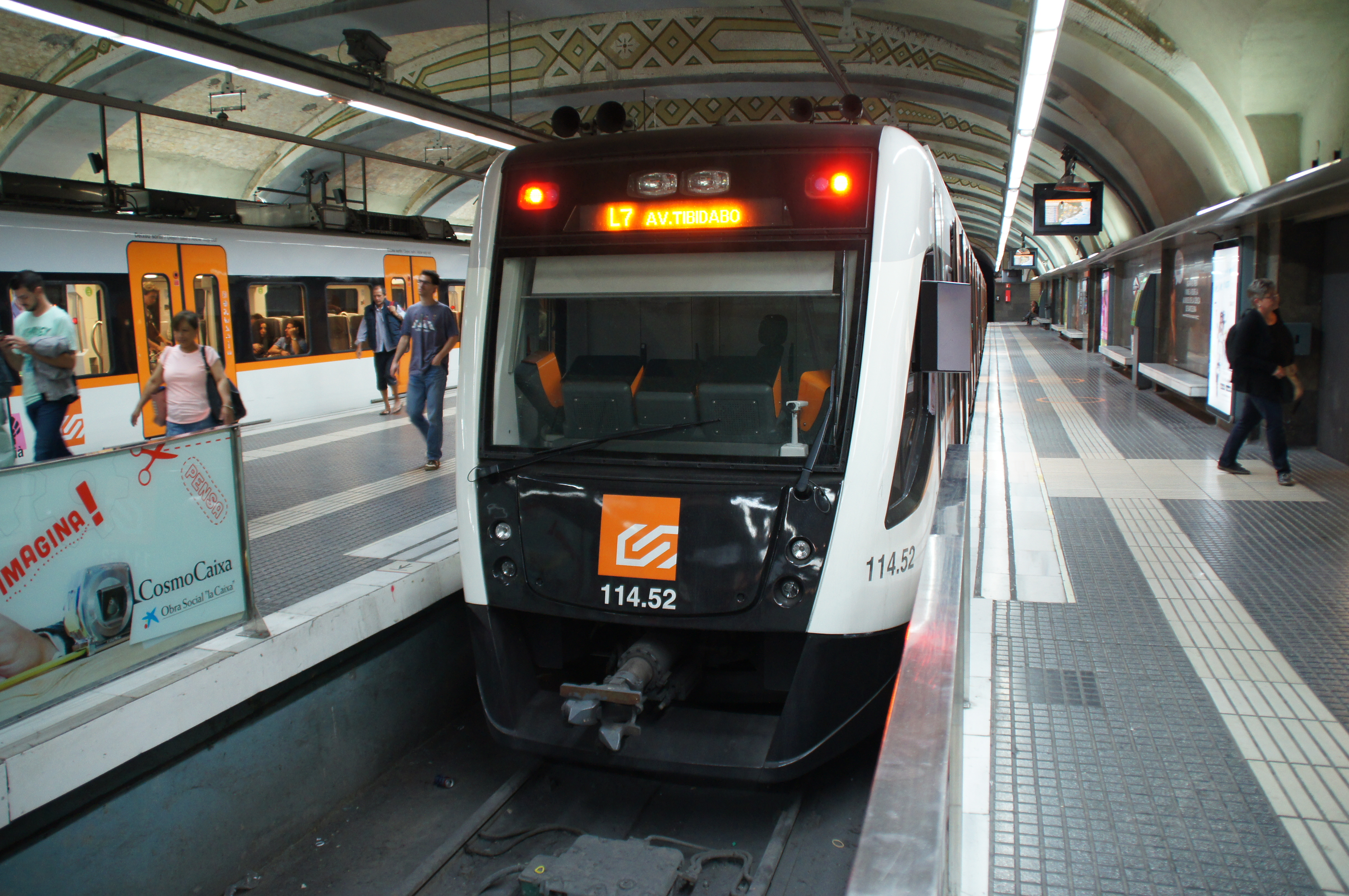
- FGC train at Plaça de Catalunya station

Overview
- Native name: Metro de Barcelona
- Owner: TMB (Lines 1-5, 9-11), FGC (Lines 6-8, 12)
- Area served: Barcelona metropolitan area (Barcelonès and Baix Llobregat)
- Locale: Barcelona, Catalonia, Spain
- Transit type: Rapid transit
- Number of lines: 12 lines (Total): 8 TMB lines; 4 FGC lines
- Number of stations: 189 (Total): 189 TMB + FGC + Funicular de Montjuic stations
- Daily ridership: 1,205,000
- Annual ridership: 480,000,000 (2025)
- Website: Barcelona Metro for TMB; Railway services for FGC

Operation
- Began operation: 1863; 163 years ago (Partial); 1924; 102 years ago (Full)
- Operators: TMB (Lines 1-5, 9-11), FGC (Lines 6-8, 12)

Technical
- System length: Total: 166 km (103.1 mi); TMB: 145 km (90.1 mi); FGC: 21.4 km (13.3 mi)
- Track gauge: 1,000 mm (3 ft 3 3/8 in) for; 1,672 mm (5 ft 5 13/16 in) for; 1,435 mm (4 ft 8 1/2 in) for all other lines
System map

The Barcelona Metro (Catalan and Spanish: Metro de Barcelona) (Note: Local pronunciation: Catalan: [ˈmɛtɾu ðə βəɾsəˈlonə]; Spanish: [ˈmetɾo ðe βaɾθeˈlona]) is a rapid transit network that runs mostly underground in central Barcelona and into the city's suburbs. It is part of the larger public transport system of Barcelona, the capital of Catalonia, Spain, with unified fares under the Autoritat del Transport Metropolità (ATM) scheme. As of 2024, the network is operated by two separate companies: Transports Metropolitans de Barcelona (TMB) and Ferrocarrils de la Generalitat de Catalunya (FGC). It is made up of 12 lines, combining the lines owned by the two companies. Two lines, L9 and L10, are being built at present, with both lines having different sections of each opened between 2009 and 2021. They are due to be fully completed in 2030. Three lines on the network have opened as automatic train operation/driverless vehicle systems since 2009: Line 11 was converted to driverless first, and Lines 9 and 10 have been driverless since they opened.

Barcelona has one of only two metros worldwide to operate on three different track gauges, being 1,000 mm (3 ft 3 3/8 in) metre gauge on line 8, 1,672 mm (5 ft 5 13/16 in) older Iberian gauge on line 1, and 1,435 mm (4 ft 8 1/2 in) standard gauge on the remaining lines; the other metro with three gauges being the Toei Subway in Tokyo, which uses two narrow gauges and standard gauge. It is the only metro worldwide to operate on both narrow and broad gauge tracks.

The network length is 170 kilometres (106 mi), with 183 stations, as of November 2021. It uses spare power from its regenerative braking to power charging stations in the vicinity of its infrastructure.

== History ==
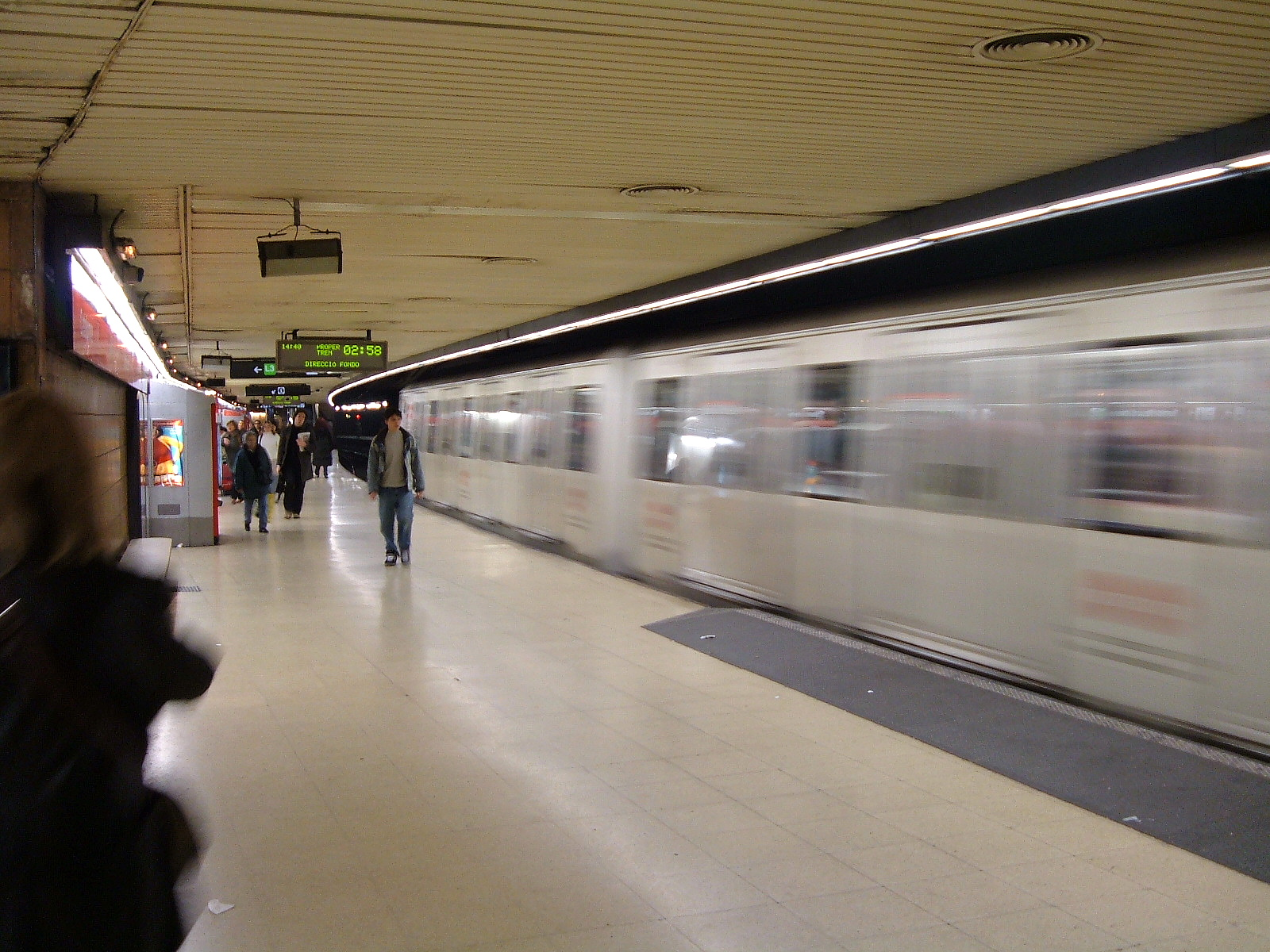
Plaça de Catalunya station (L1)

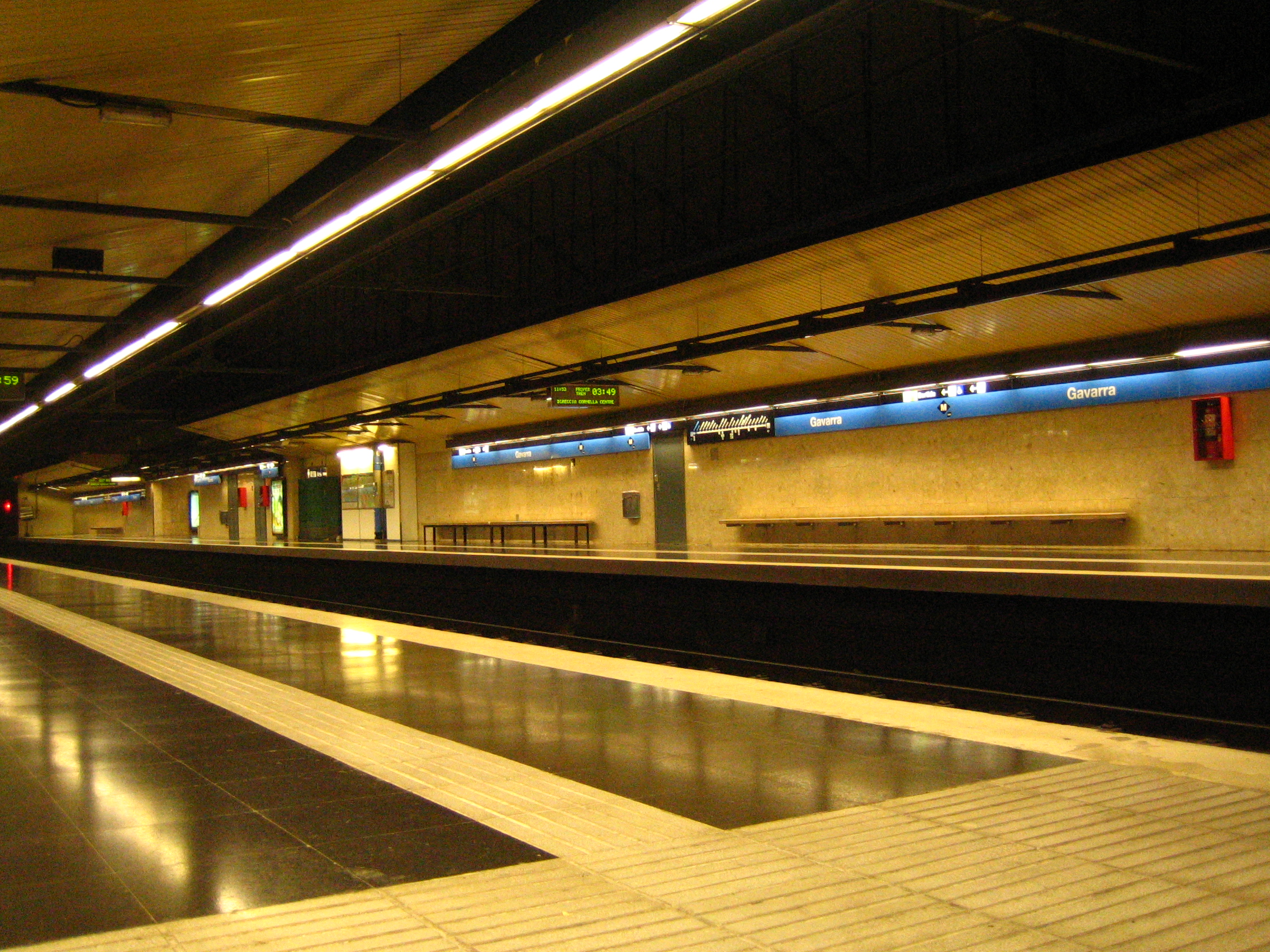
Gavarra station (L5)

The first rapid transit railway service in Barcelona was founded in 1863 by the private company Ferrocarril de Barcelona a Sarrià ("Railway from Barcelona to Sarrià", after 1916 Sarrià joined the municipality of Barcelona). Later this line evolved in what now is basically the current L6 metro service. This railway system, now part of the Ferrocarrils de la Generalitat de Catalunya company, was later inspired by the London Underground naming style having long names for the lines ("Sarrià line", "Balmes line"...).

Much later, in the 1920s, a second and a third rapid transit railway systems were founded with the construction of the Gran Metro between Lesseps and the Plaça de Catalunya (part of the modern L3) and, two years later, the Metro Transversal (now part of L1). This third one was built between the Plaça de Catalunya and la Bordeta to link the city centre with the Plaça d'Espanya and Montjuïc, the site of the 1929 Barcelona International Exposition. These two later rapid transit companies contrasted with the first one in being inspired by the Métropolitain de Paris (named after the Metropolitan Railway, from where the word "metro" comes).

As of 2022, the network consists of 12 lines managed by 2 different operators: Transports Metropolitans de Barcelona (TMB) and Ferrocarrils de la Generalitat de Catalunya (FGC, or Catalan Government Railways). Fares and nomenclature are controlled by the Autoritat del Transport Metropolità, a citywide system that also includes local and regional buses, tramways and some commuter and regional train services.

== Network ==
As of early 2020, the total length of the network, including both the sections operated by TMB and FGC, as well as the Montjuïc Funicular, is 166 km (103 mi) long with 189 stations.

The main part of the network, operated by TMB, consists of eight lines, numbered L1 to L5 and L9 to L11 (which are distinguished on network maps by different colours), covering 102.6 kilometres (63.8 mi) of route and 141 stations.

FGC lines are numbered L6, L7, L8 and L12. These lines, except all of L12 and part of L7, share tracks with commuter rail lines.

The Barcelona Metro lines do not have a name of their own but are generally referred to by their colour or by the number and the names of their termini.

=== Lines ===
The lines run as follows:

Line Number	Termini	Operator	Current length	Approved length	Current stations	Approved stations	Year of opening	Gauge	Electrification
Barcelona Metro line 1	Hospital de Bellvitge–Fondo	TMB	20.700 km 12.862 mi	29.758 km 18.491 mi	30	38	1926	1,672 mm (5 ft 5 13/16 in)	1,500 V DC rigid overhead line
Barcelona Metro line 2	Paral·lel–Badalona Pompeu Fabra	TMB	13.700 km 8.513 mi	18.466 km 11.474 mi	18	34	1995	1,435 mm (4 ft 8 1/2 in)	1,200–1,500 V DC rigid overhead line
Barcelona Metro line 3	Zona Universitària–Trinitat Nova	TMB	18.400 km 11.433 mi	20.024 km 12.442 mi	26	36	1924	1,435 mm (4 ft 8 1/2 in)	1,200 V DC rigid overhead line
Barcelona Metro line 4	Trinitat Nova–La Pau	TMB	17.300 km 10.750 mi	18.916 km 11.754 mi	22	26	1973 (1926)	1,435 mm (4 ft 8 1/2 in)	1,200 V DC rigid overhead line
Barcelona Metro line 5	Cornellà Centre–Vall d'Hebron	TMB	19.168 km 11.910 mi		27		1959	1,435 mm (4 ft 8 1/2 in)	1,200 V DC rigid overhead line
Barcelona Metro line 6	Pl. Catalunya–Sarrià	FGC	4.884 km 3.035 mi		8 (2 (Note: Plaça Catalunya and Provença share the same tracks, but Gràcia doesn't) shared with L7)		1929 (1863)	1,435 mm (4 ft 8 1/2 in)	1,500 V DC overhead line
Barcelona Metro line 7	Pl. Catalunya–Av. Tibidabo	FGC	4.634 km 2.879 mi		7 (2 shared with L6)		1953 (1863)	1,435 mm (4 ft 8 1/2 in)	1,500 V DC overhead line
Barcelona Metro line 8	Pl. Espanya–Molí Nou-Ciutat Cooperativa	FGC	11.266 km 7.000 mi		11	21	2000 (1912)	1,000 mm (3 ft 3 3/8 in)	1,500 V DC overhead line
Barcelona Metro line 9	Aeroport T1–Zona Universitària	TMB	19.600 km 12.179 mi	47.800 km 29.702 mi	15	39	2009	1,435 mm (4 ft 8 1/2 in)	1,500 V DC rigid overhead line
Barcelona Metro line 9	La Sagrera–Can Zam	TMB	7.867 km 4.888 mi	47.800 km 29.702 mi	9 (3 shared with L10)	39	2009	1,435 mm (4 ft 8 1/2 in)	1,500 V DC rigid overhead line
Barcelona Metro line 10	La Sagrera–Gorg	TMB	5.570 km 3.461 mi	47.800 km 29.702 mi	6 (3 shared with L9)	33	2010	1,435 mm (4 ft 8 1/2 in)	1,500 V DC rigid overhead line
Barcelona Metro line 10	Collblanc-ZAL-Riu Vell	TMB	7.500 km 4.660 mi	47.800 km 29.702 mi	11 (3 shared with L9)	33	2018	1,435 mm (4 ft 8 1/2 in)	1,500 V DC rigid overhead line
Barcelona Metro line 11	Trinitat Nova–Can Cuiàs	TMB	2.109 km 1.310 mi		5		2003	1,435 mm (4 ft 8 1/2 in)	1,500 V DC rigid overhead line
Barcelona Metro line 12	Sarrià–Reina Elisenda	FGC	0.600 km 0.373 mi	3.200 km 1.988 mi	2	5	2016 (1976)	1,435 mm (4 ft 8 1/2 in)	1,500 V DC rigid overhead line

In addition to those, Renfe and FGC trains and the increasingly important tram routes (Trambaix, Trambesòs) and stations are displayed on most recent maps, including the info maps in the metro stations, all in a single variety of dark green.

=== L9 and L10 ===
Train arriving to Airport T1 station (Barcelona Metro line 9).

Construction work is taking place currently on L9/L10, which when finished will run from Badalona and Santa Coloma de Gramenet to the Zona Franca district and El Prat International Airport. The lines, which share a central section between Bon Pastor and Can Tries | Gornal, will be the longest automated metro line in Europe, at 47.8 kilometres (29.7 mi), and combined will have 52 stations. The project was approved in 2000 but has been challenged by some technical difficulties and some of their sections are pending further geological analysis. The first section of Line 9 that runs between La Sagrera and Can Zam opened in 2009, and by June 2010 eleven new stations on the new Lines L9 and L10 had opened. As of February 2016, the 15-station, 19.6-kilometre (12.2 mi) south section of Line L9 between Zona Universitària and the airport (Aeroport T1 station) opened.

== Rolling stock ==
TMB rolling stock

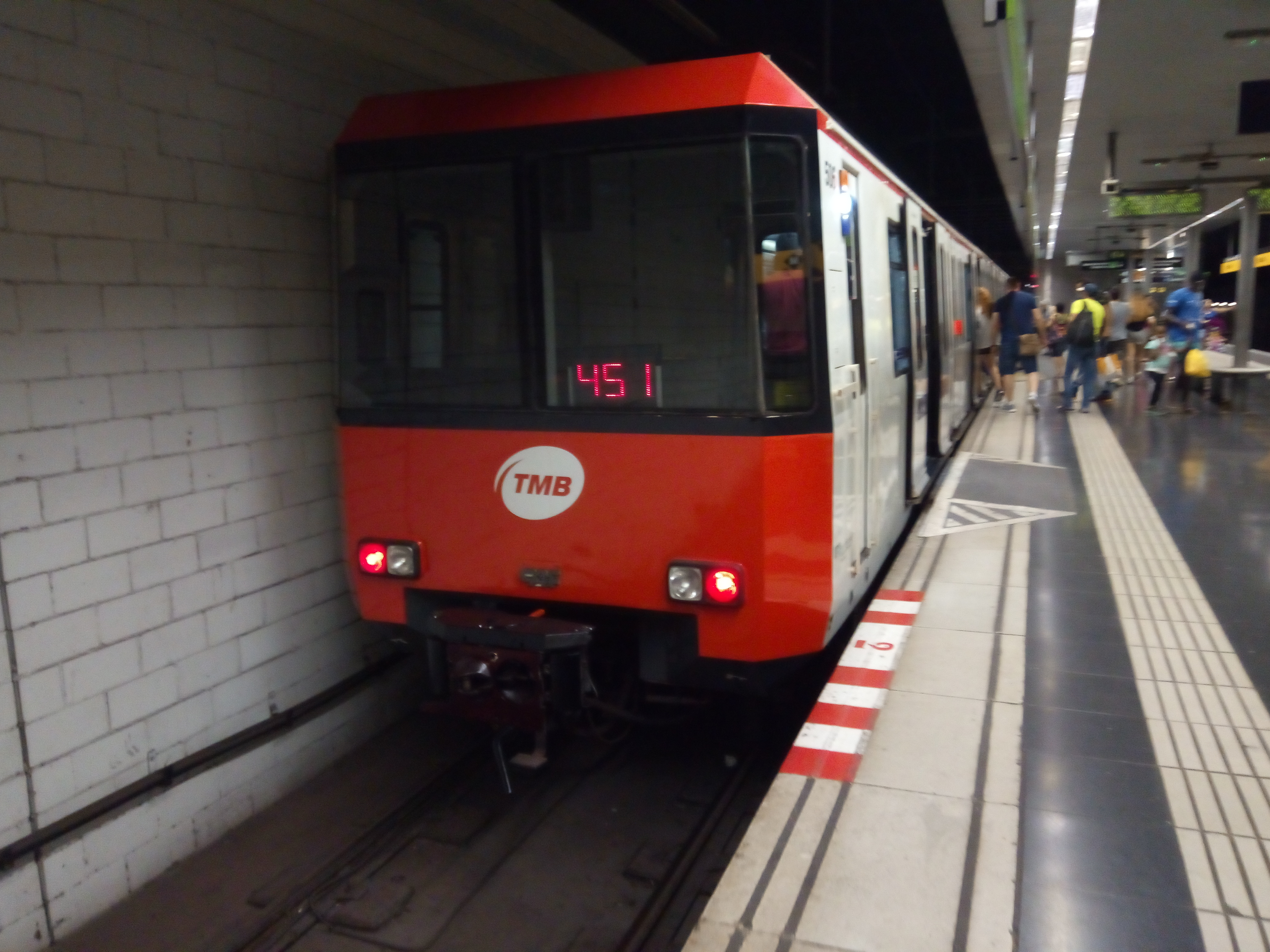
Series 500

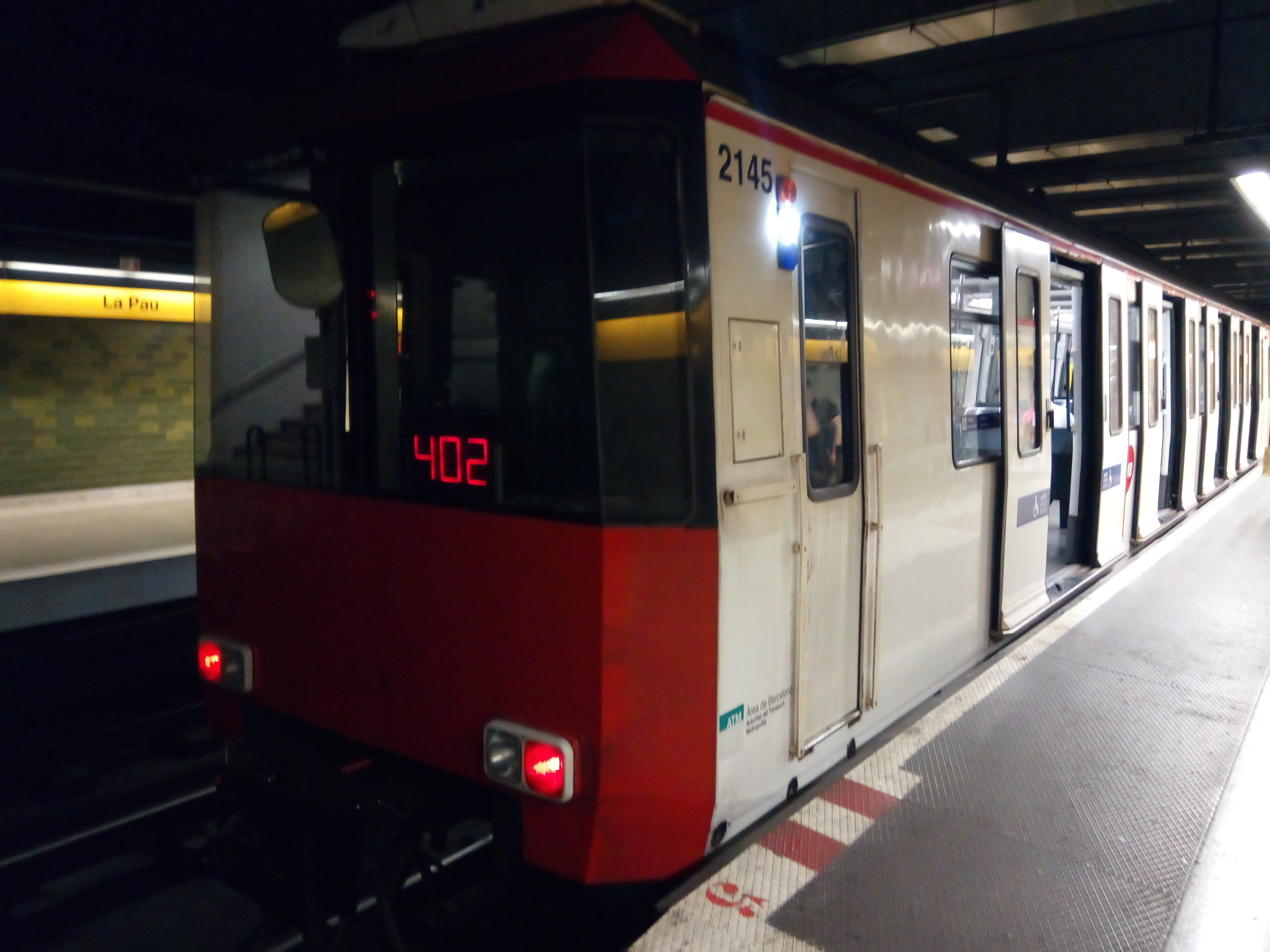
Series 2100

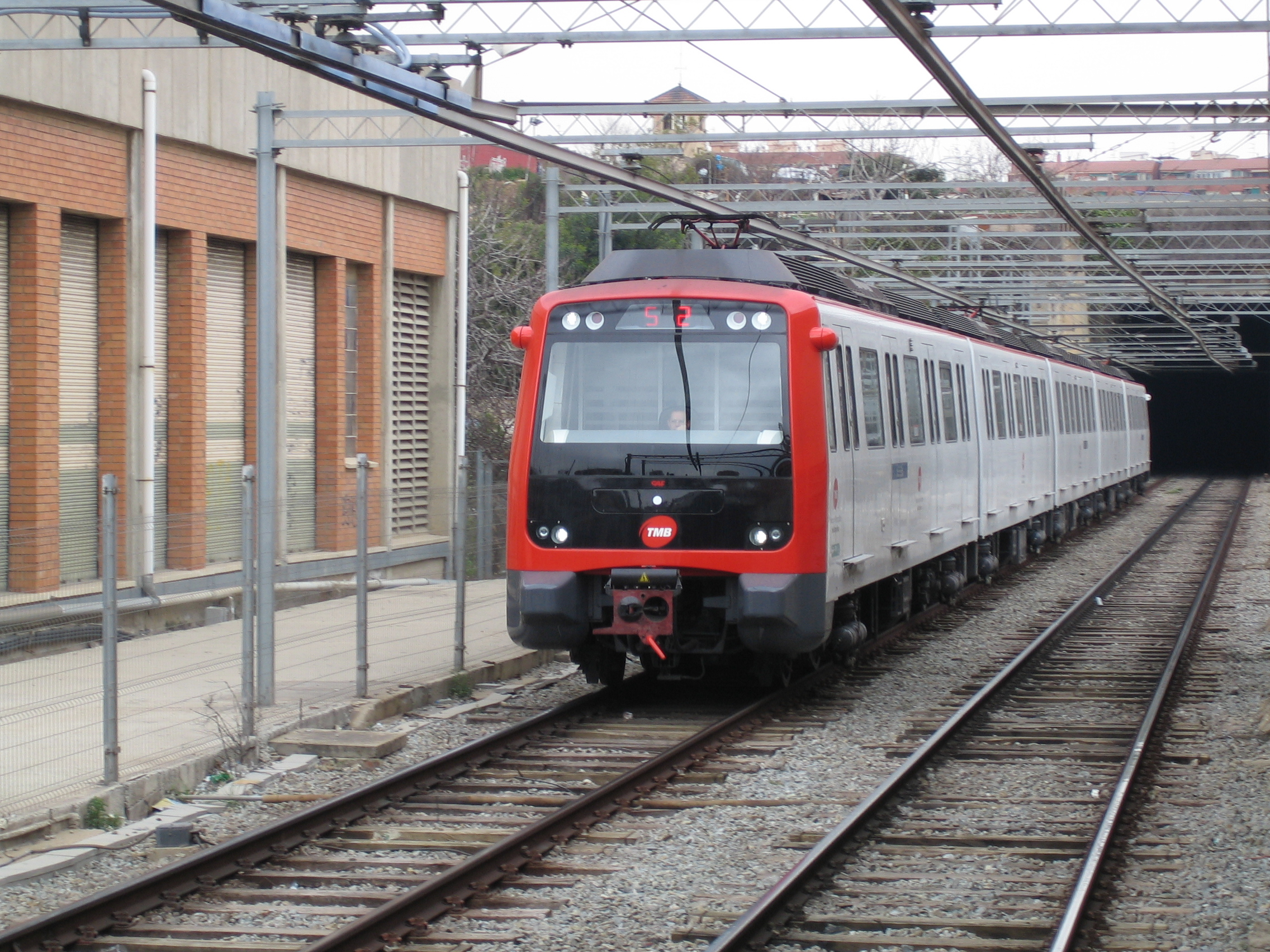
Series 5000

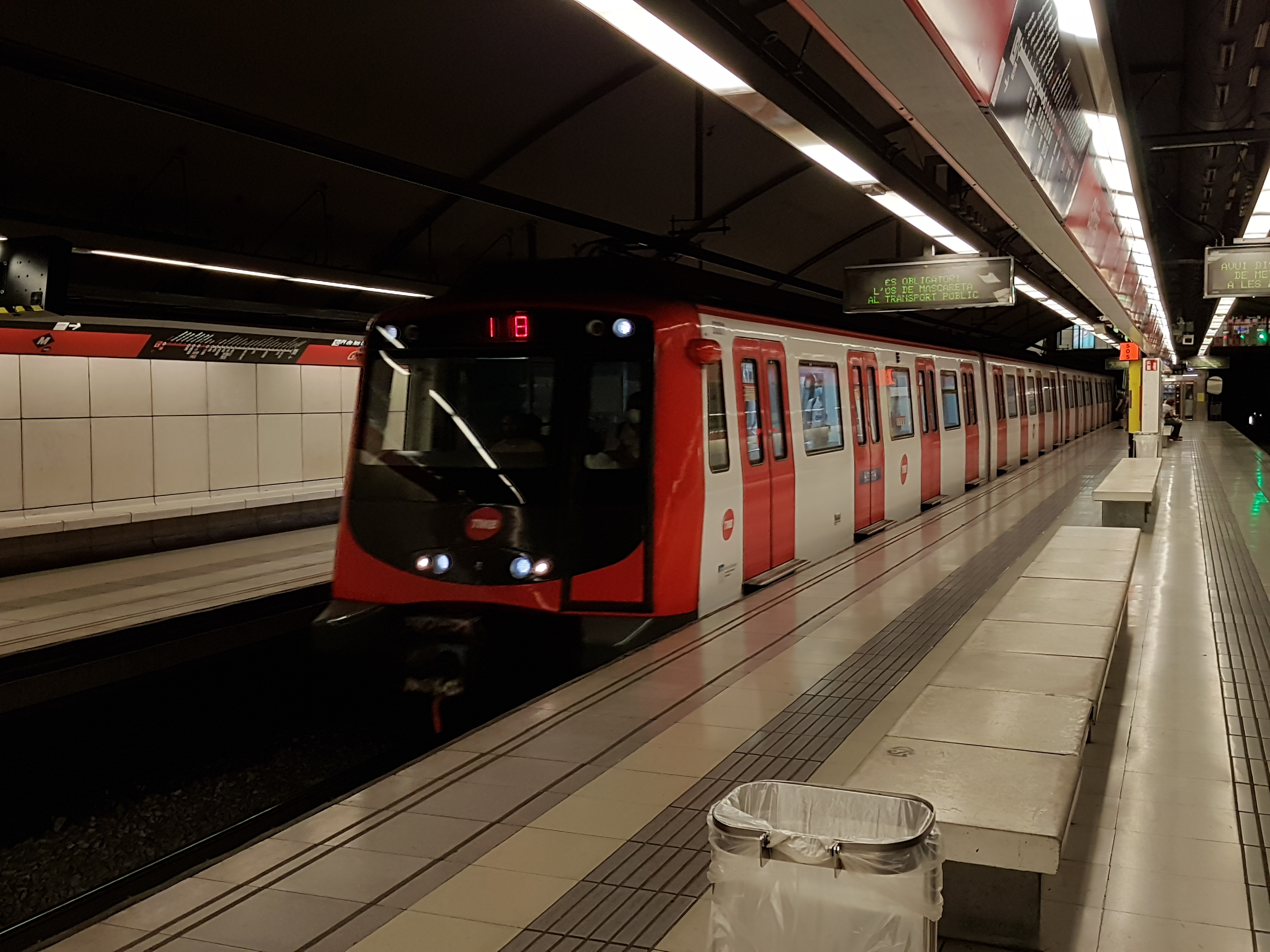
Series 6000

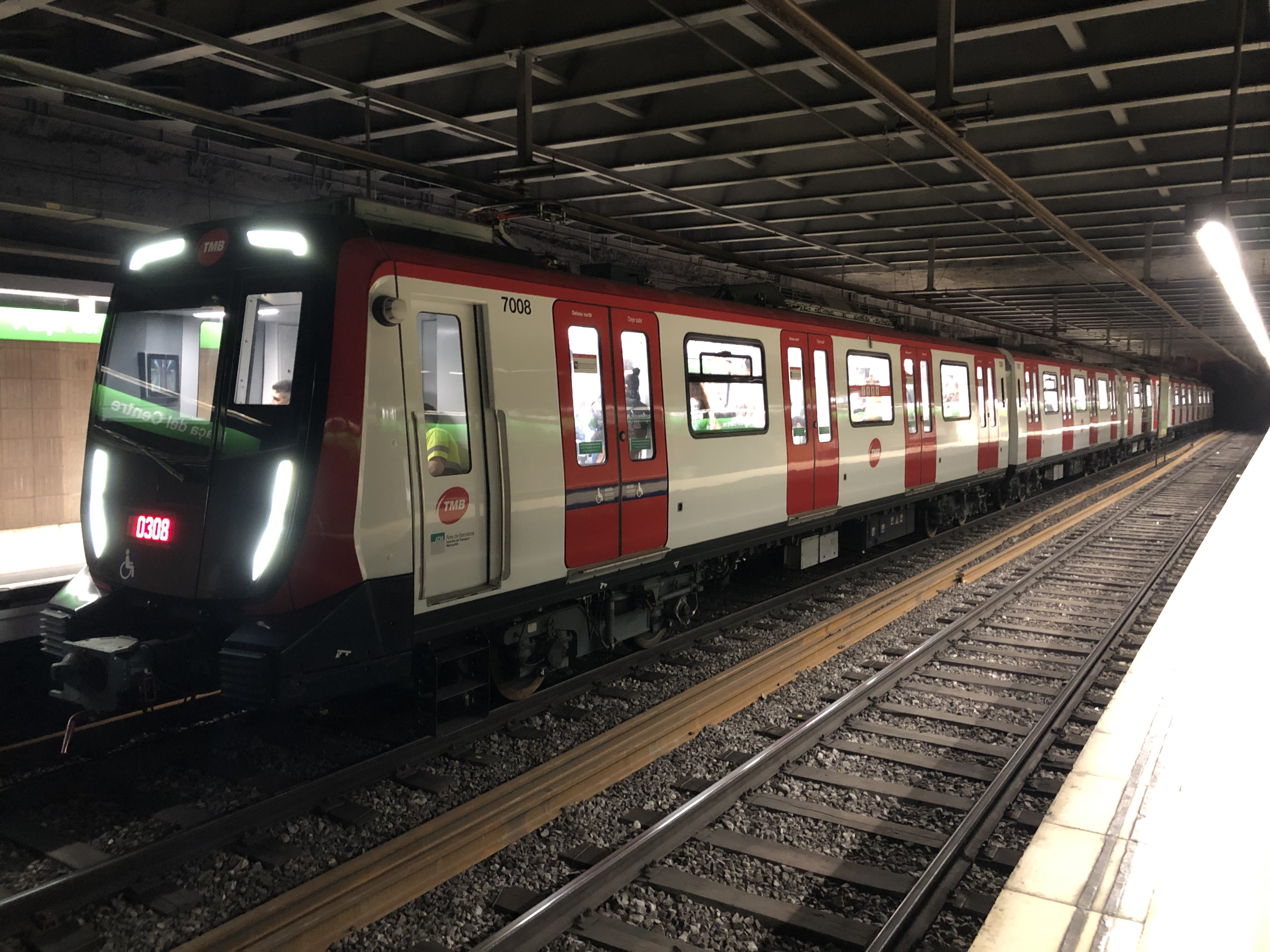
Series 7000

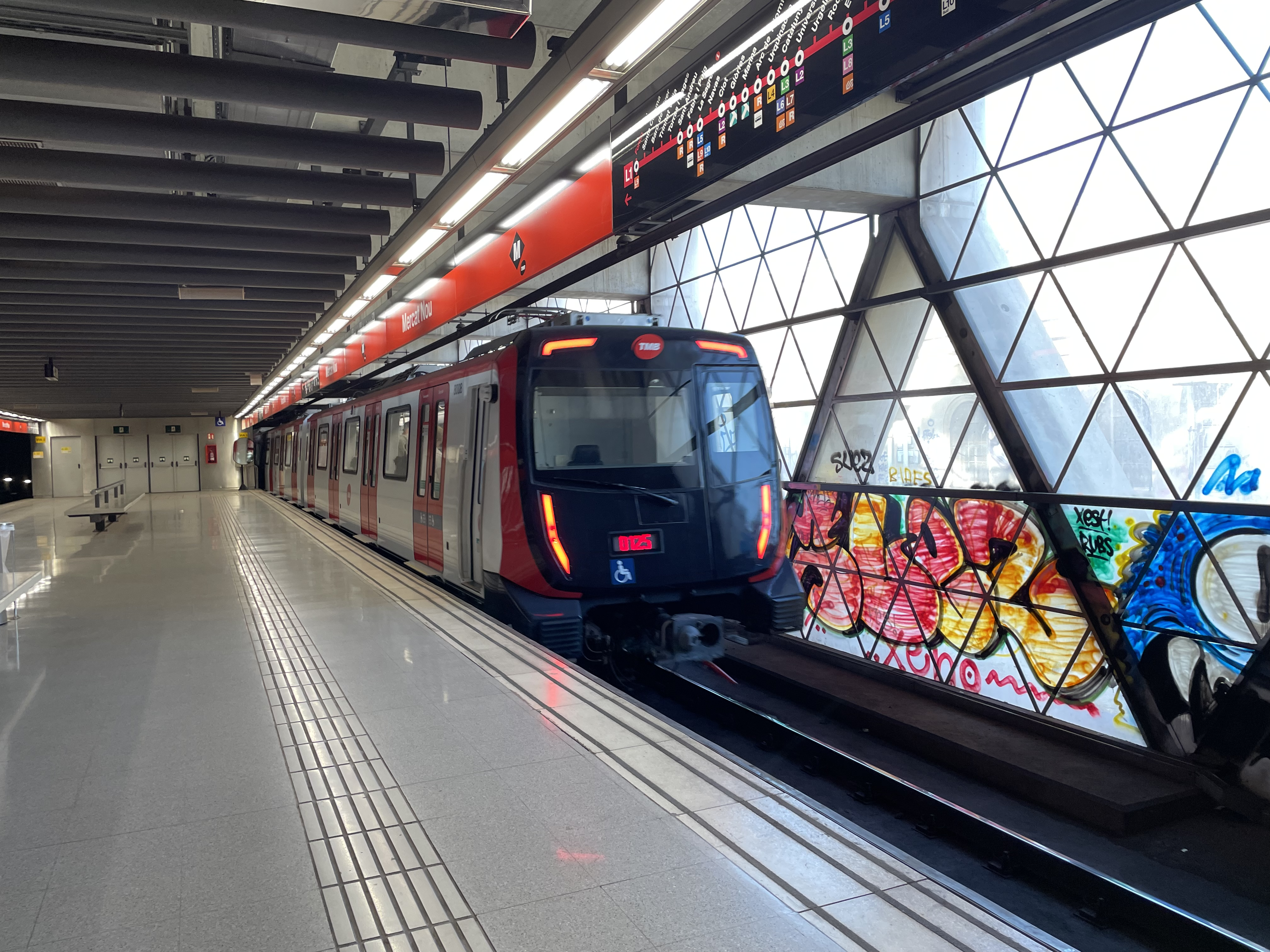
Series 8000

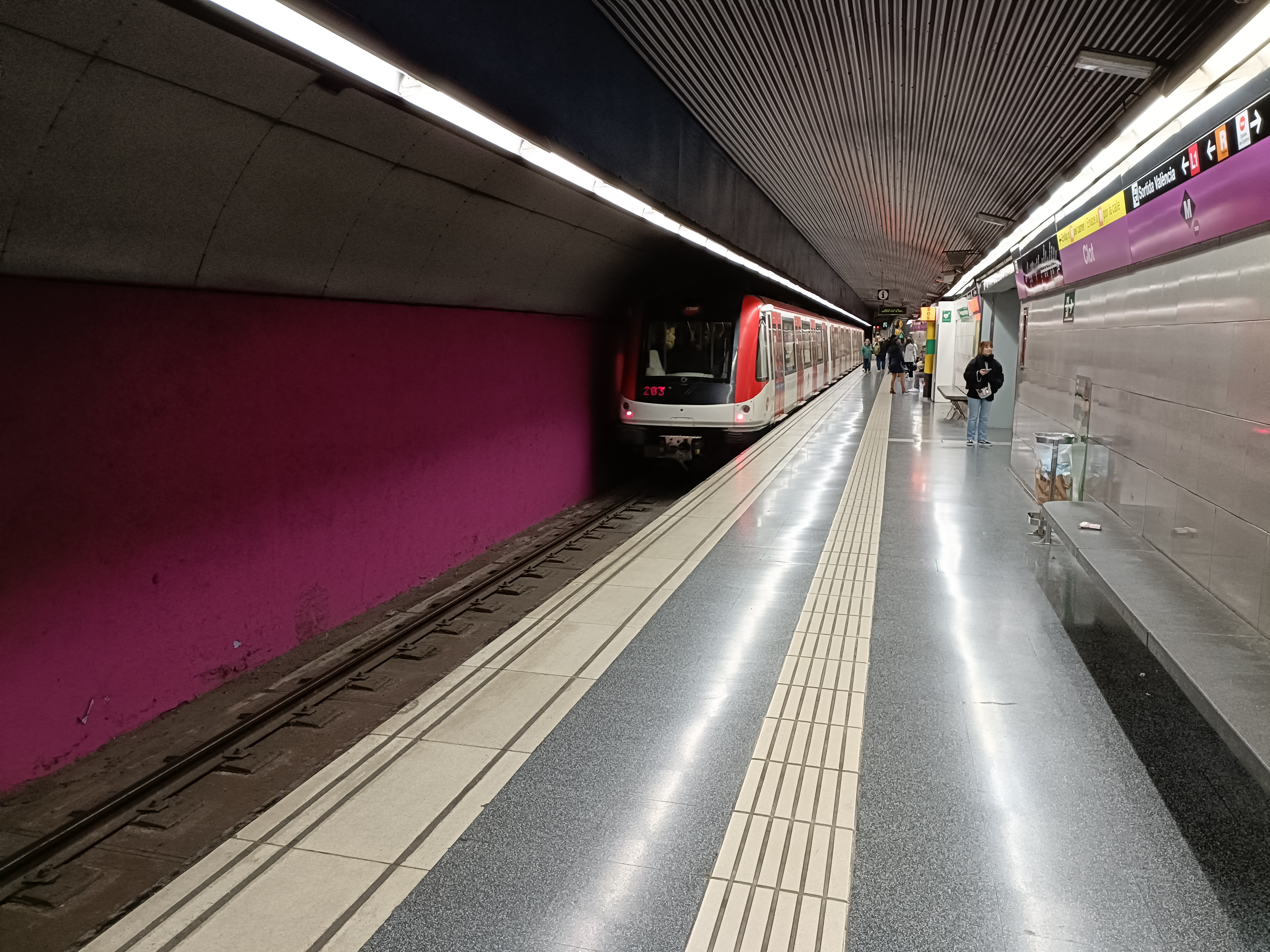
Series 9000
FGC rolling stock

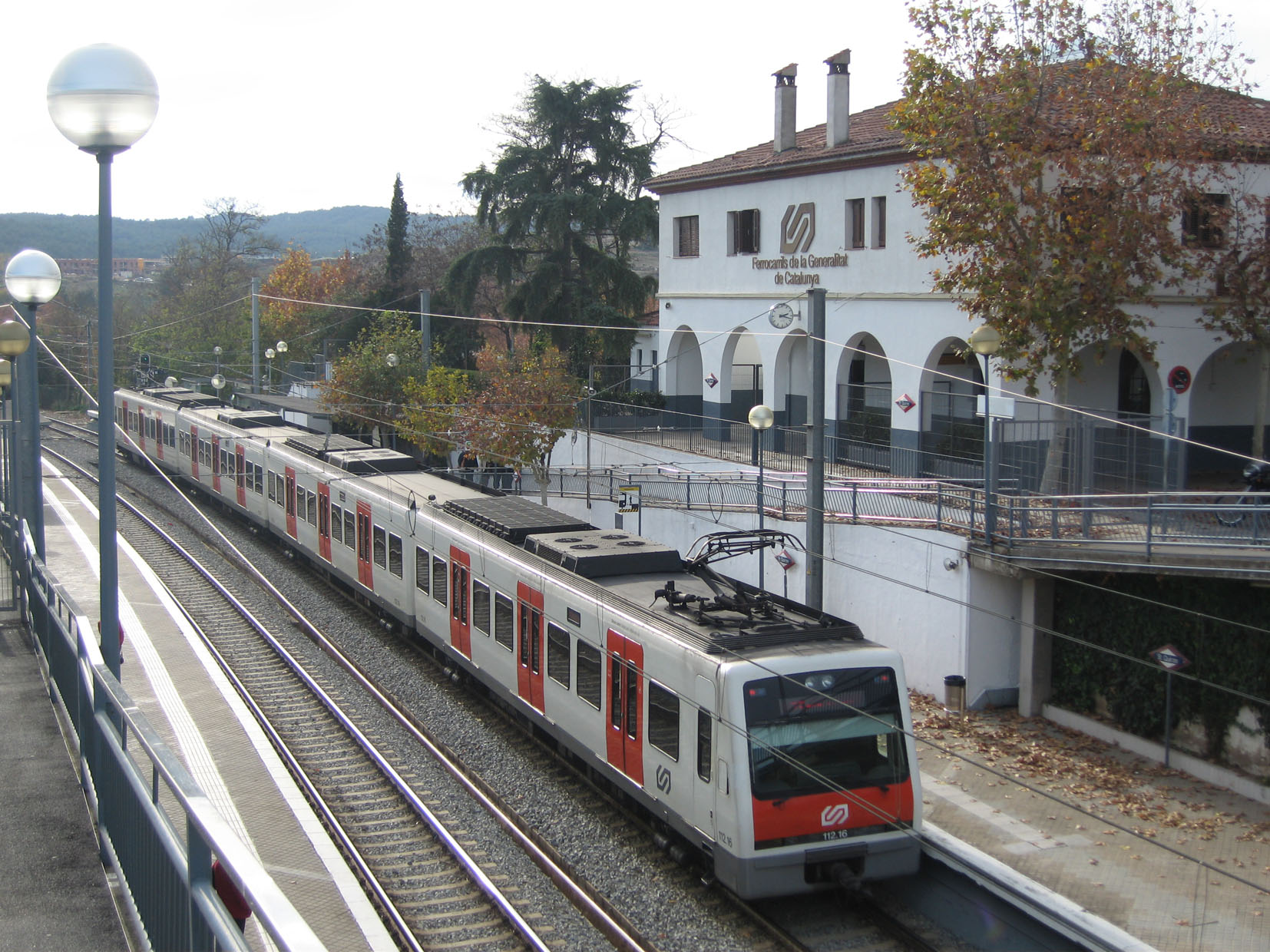
Series 112

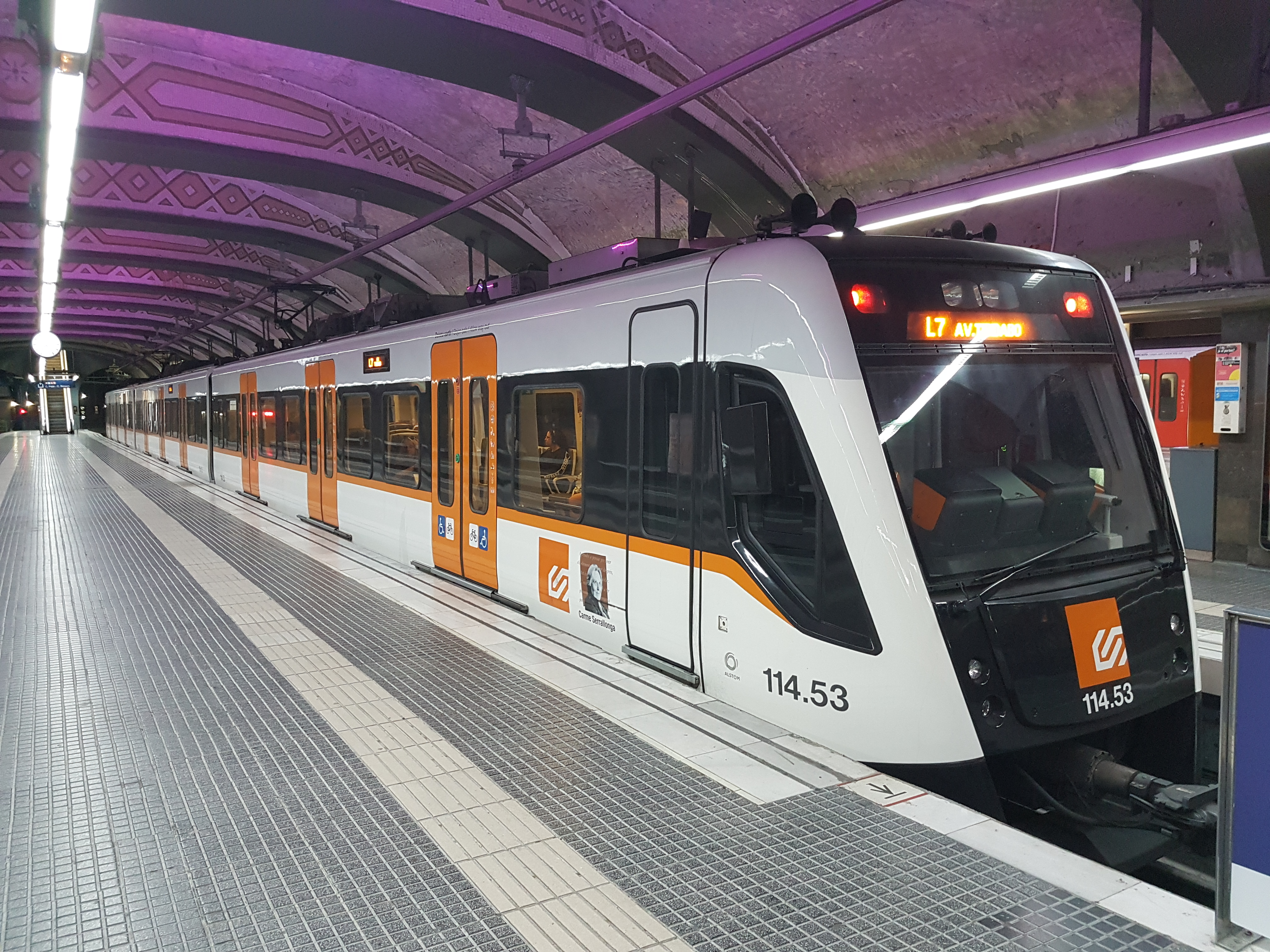
Series 113 (4 cars) and 114 (3 cars)

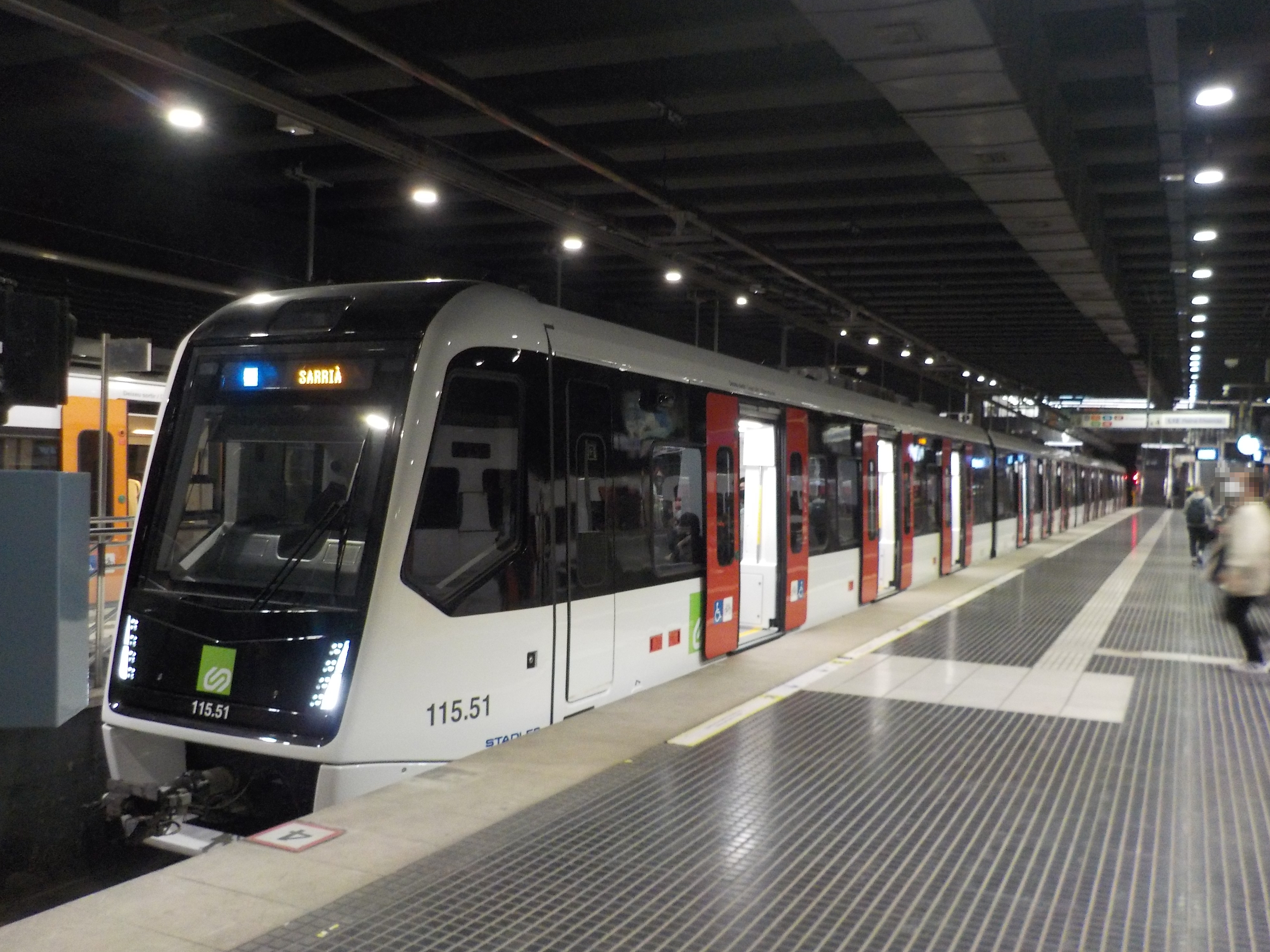
Series 115

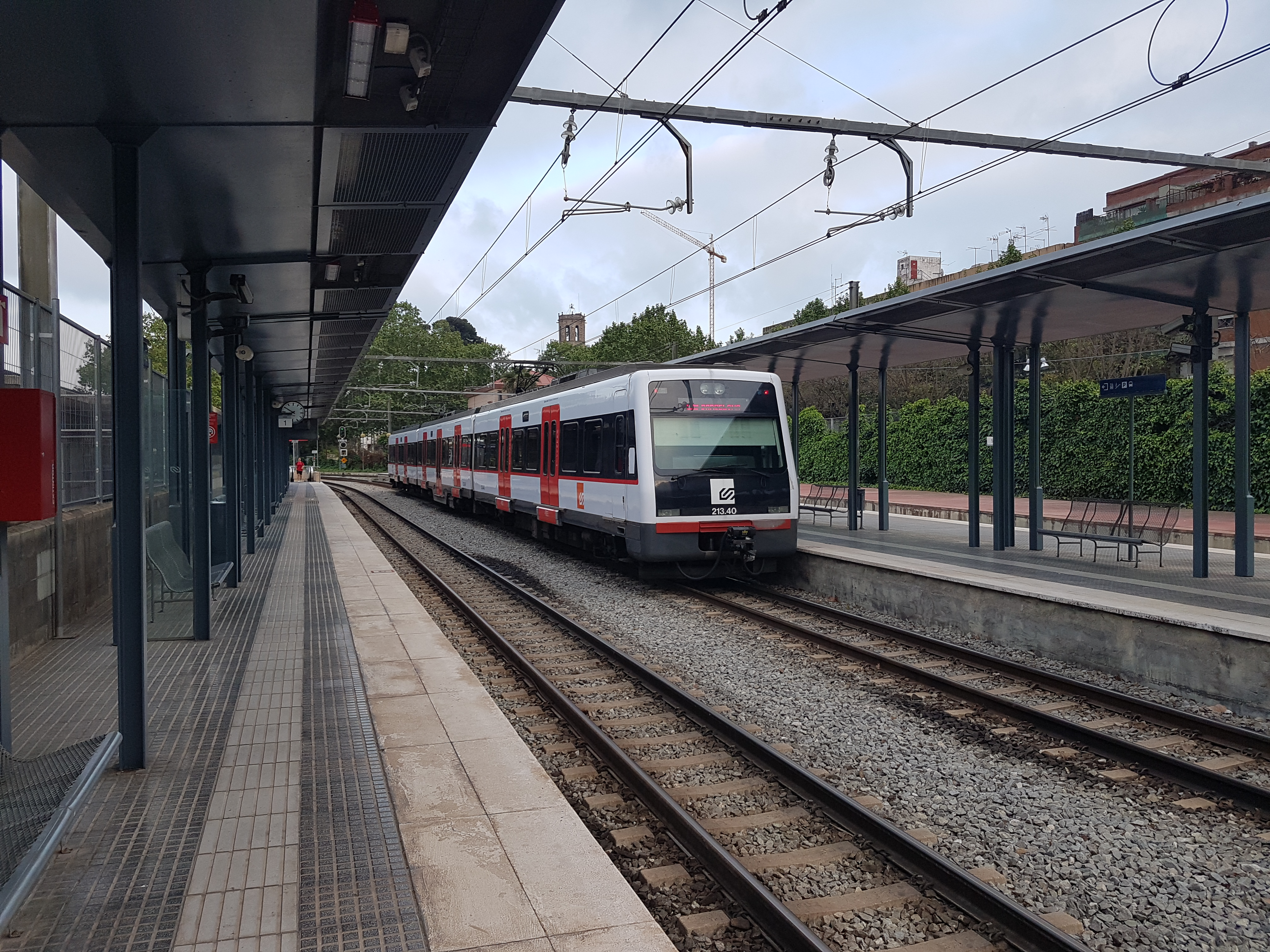
Series 213

== Tickets and pricing ==
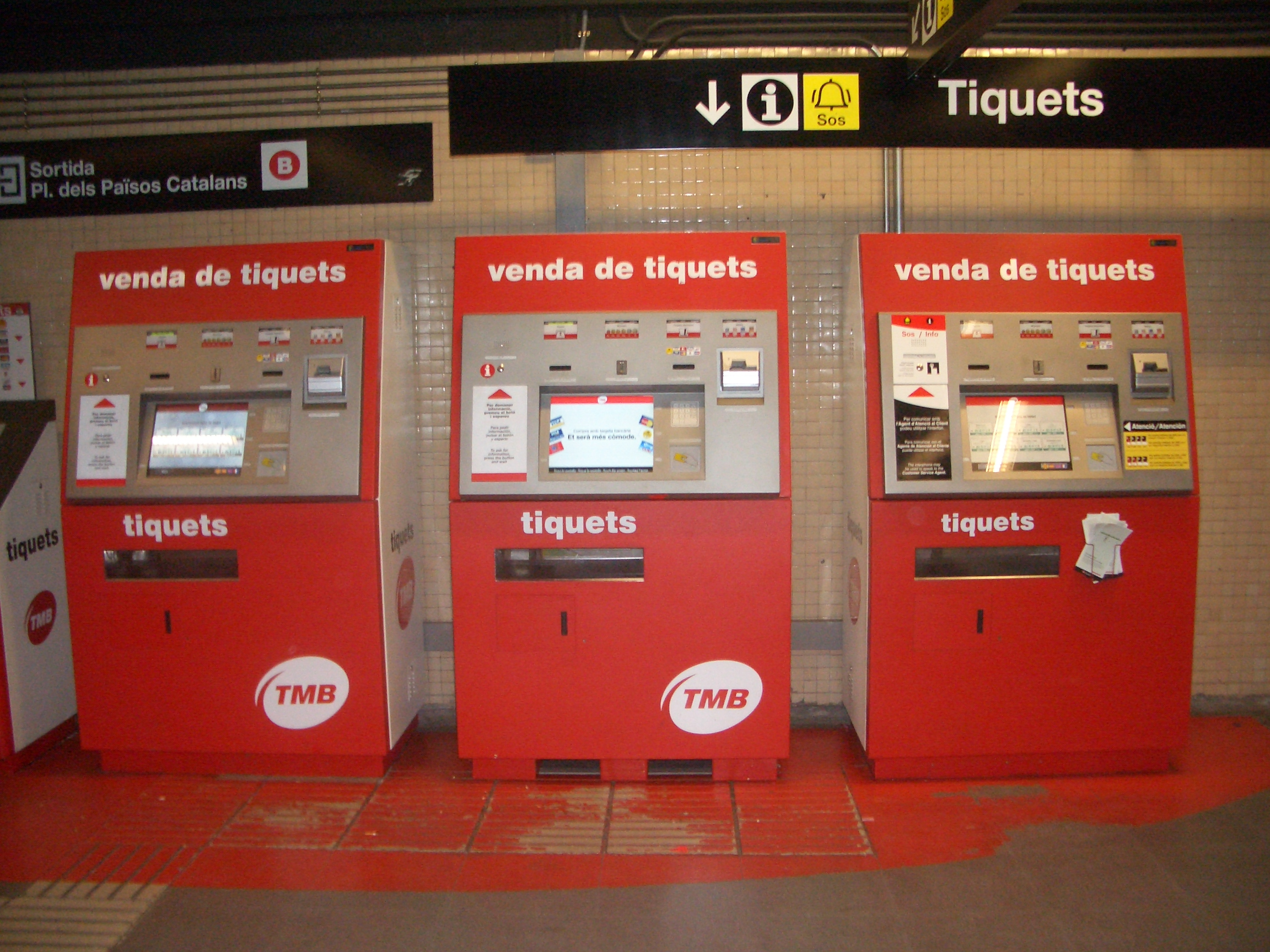
Ticket vending machines at Sants Estació station.

In addition to the one-way ticket there are a number of other tickets and cards. All of the Autoritat del Transport Metropolità (ATM) transport cards are valid and can be used on the Barcelona Metro. These are:

- Airport Ticket, is a one-way ticket for a journey between Aeroport T1 and Aeroport T2 stations on metro line L9 Sud and the rest of the metro network. Standard metro tickets such as single tickets are not valid for a trip to the airport.
- T casual, which includes ten rides at a discounted price
- T usual, unlimited journeys made in 30 consecutive days from the first use
- T-16, unlimited journeys for children below 16

All of the metro stations are within fare zone 1.

== Stations ==
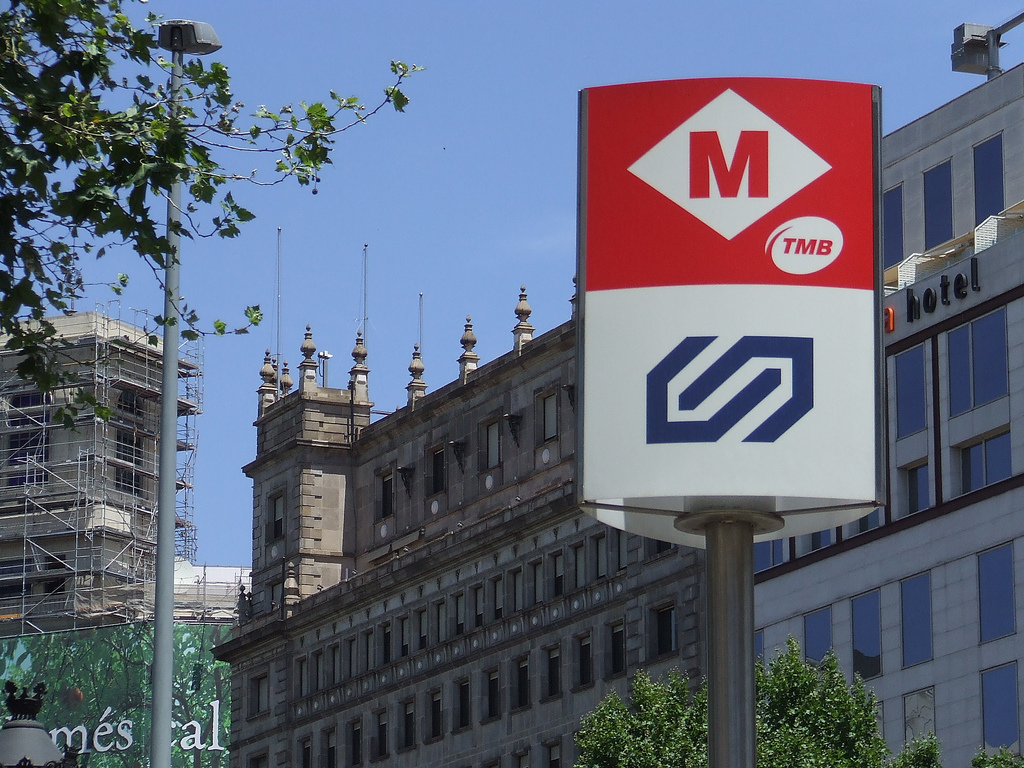
TMB (top) and FGC (bottom, old) logos outside Plaça de Catalunya station.

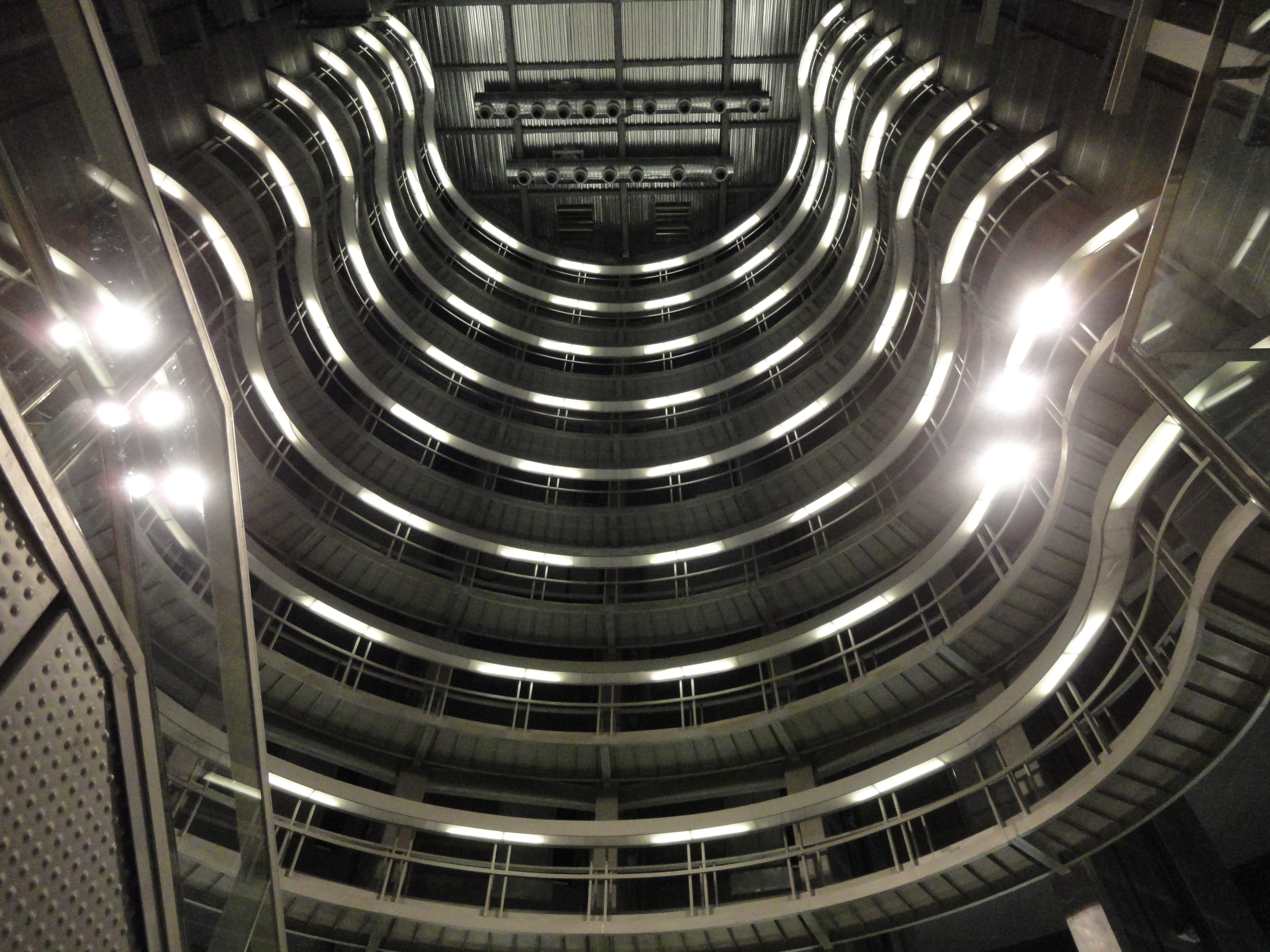
Elevators in Llefià station.

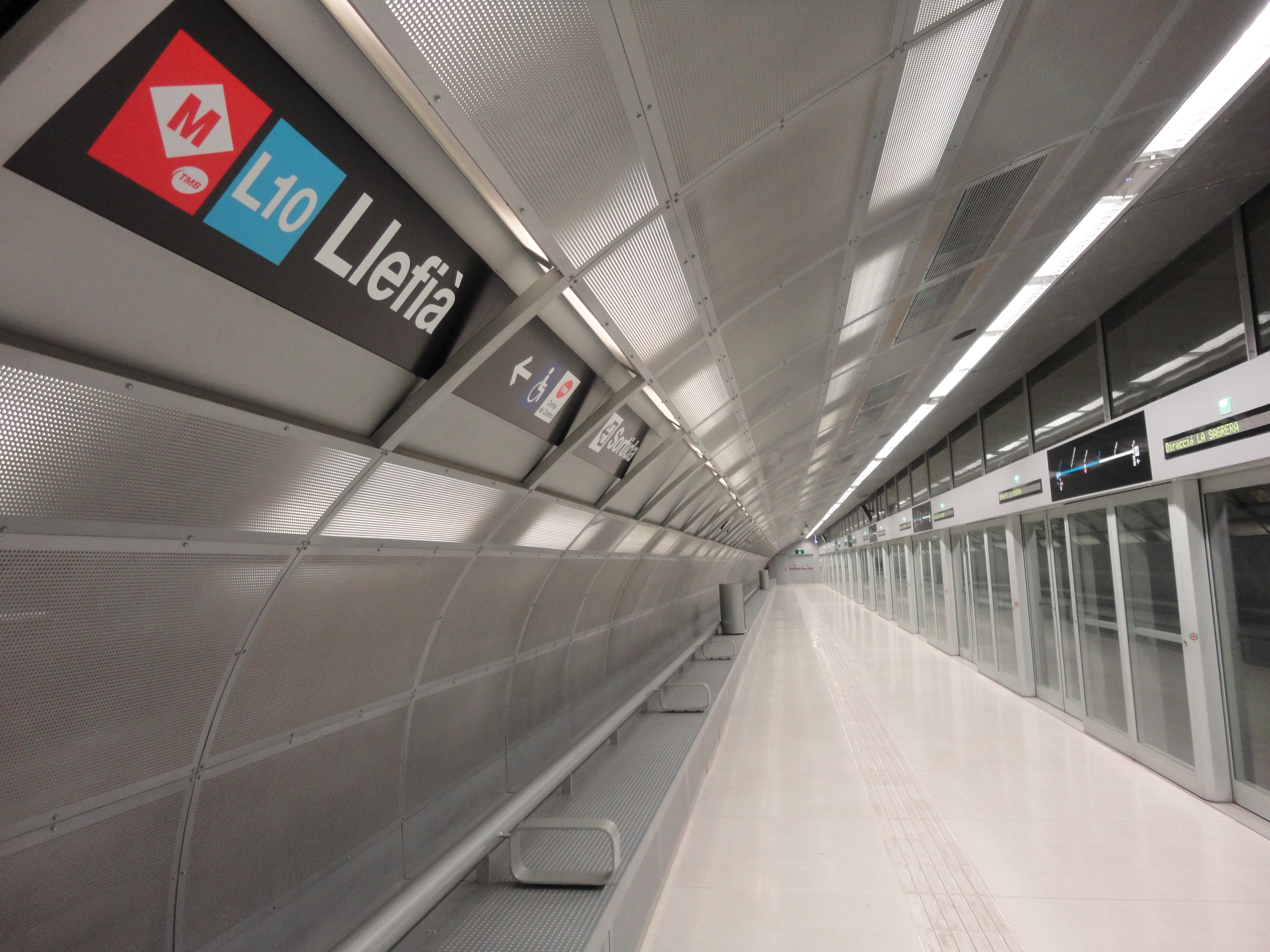
Llefià station (L10 Nord).

At the end of 2018, there are 187 operational stations in the Barcelona Metro, served by the 12 lines in current use. The average distance between 2 stations is 807.50 metres.

An overwhelming majority of stations in the network lack related buildings or structures aboveground, mostly consisting of an access with stairs, escalators or elevators. The official TMB metro indicator, a red rhombus with a M inside, remains unused by FGC lines, which use their company logo and a different rhombus-shaped logo (actually rather similar to the one used inside the Madrid Metro) inside stations. Below ground their decoration is remarkably sober, with the exception of the new stations.

=== Disused stations ===
A number of stations in the network have been closed, were never inaugurated, or have been moved to a nearby location. See the main article for more details.

== Accessibility ==
Accessibility for passengers with reduced mobility is nearing completion. As of April 2022, 8 out of 192 stations are not fully accessible.
The non accessible stations are:

- Ciutadella | Vila Olímpica (L4)
- Clot (L1)
- Espanya (L1/L3) - The FGC Plaça Espanya station (L8 and suburban lines) is accessible.
- Maragall (L4/L5)
- Plaça de Sants (L1/L5)
- Urquinaona (L1/L4)
- Verdaguer (L4/L5)
- Virrei Amat (L5)

Lines L2, L6, L7, L8, L9 Nord, L9 Sud, L10 Nord, L10 Sud, L11 and L12 are fully accessible.

Non accessible connections (in both directions):

- Catalunya L1/Rodalies (commuter/regional) to/from L3/FGC (metro L6/L7 and commuter)
- Passeig de Gràcia L2/L4 to/from L3/Rodalies (commuter/regional)
- Clot L1 to L2 in both directions (the Clot L2 station is accessible).
- Ciutadella | Vila Olímpica L4 to/from Trambesòs

For up to date info check the official sites of TMB and FGC

== Transportation in the Metropolitan Area of Barcelona ==
The Barcelona Metro is part of a larger transportation network, regulated and fare-integrated by Autoritat del Transport Metropolità.

Among these services, there are two large systems which operate both inside and outside the city limits of Barcelona: the commuter train lines operated by Renfe, amalgamated in the Rodalies Barcelona, or Ferrocarrils de la Generalitat de Catalunya lines which start in the metro lines the company operates (L6, L7, L8, and L12) and which become a fully-fledged railway system which serves most of the metropolitan area: list of FGC lines. FGC is developing metros for Sabadell and Terrassa - see Barcelona–Vallès Line.

== In popular culture ==
The Spanish psychological horror film Estación Rocafort prominently features the Barcelona metro, with the Rocafort station serving as a key setting for much of the plot. The movie draws inspiration from the dark legend surrounding the Rocafort Station. Directed by Luis Prieto, the film stars Natalia Azahara alongside Javier Gutiérrez, Valèria Sorolla and Albert Baró.

== See also ==
=== Barcelona Metro topics ===
- List of Barcelona Metro stations
- Disused Barcelona Metro stations
- Autoritat del Transport Metropolità
- Spanish solution, also known as Barcelona solution

=== Rapid transit in Barcelona ===
- Transport in Barcelona
- List of railway stations in Barcelona
- Rodalies de Catalunya and FGC-operated Rodalies Barcelona
- List of Rodalies Barcelona railway stations
- FGC suburban lines
- Trambaix and Trambesòs
- Tramvia blau
- List of tram stations in Barcelona
- Funicular de Montjuïc
- Funicular de Vallvidrera

=== Other metro systems in Spain ===
- Bilbao Metro
- Madrid Metro
- Palma Metro
- Seville Metro
- Metrovalencia
- Málaga Metro
- List of metro systems
