= Plaça de Sants station =

Metro station in Barcelona, Spain

Plaça de Sants
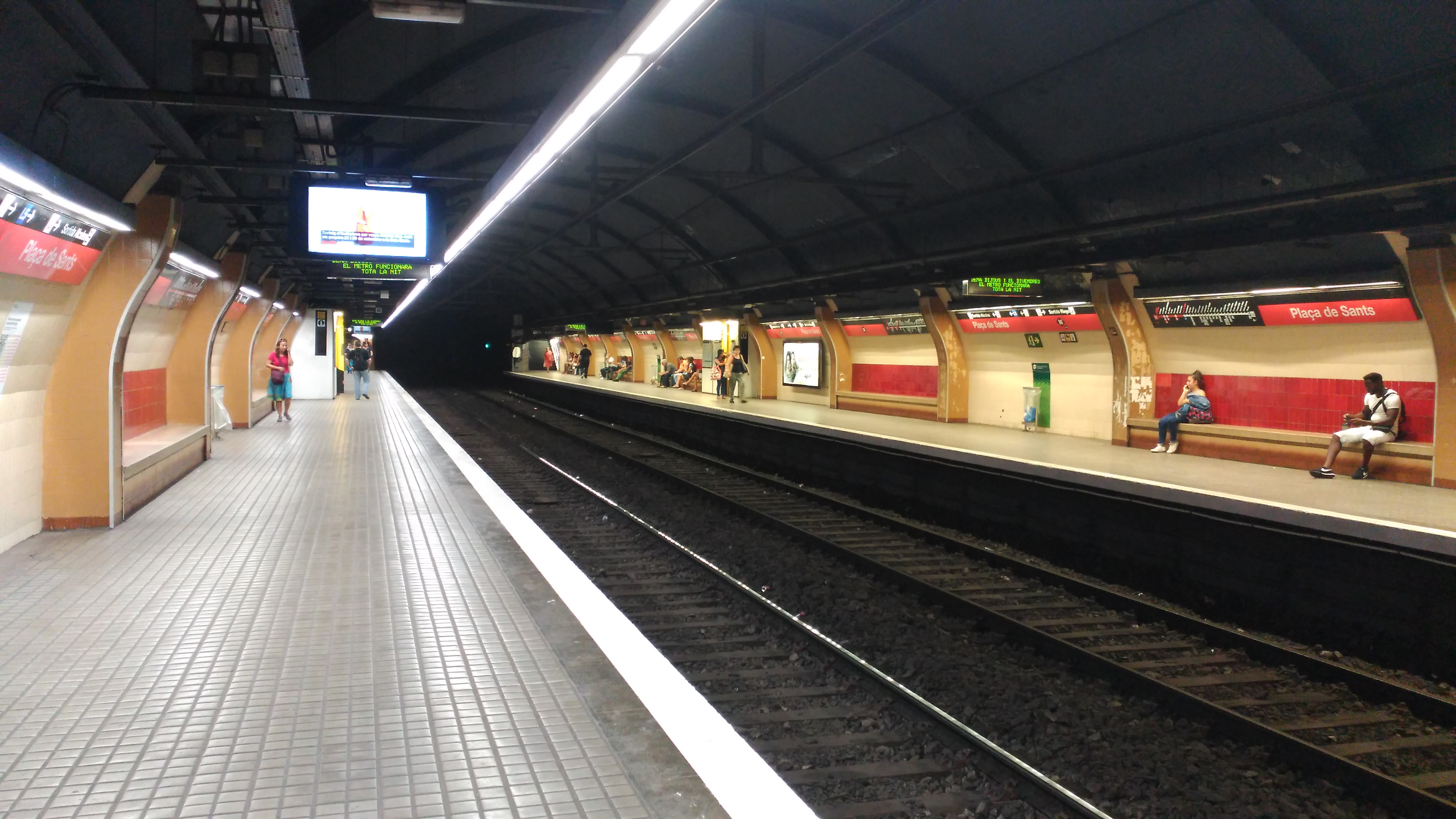
- L1 platforms

General information
- Location: Barcelona (Sants-Montjuïc)
- Coordinates: 41°22′31″N 2°8′11″E
- System: Barcelona Metro rapid transit station
- Owner: Transports Metropolitans de Barcelona

Construction
- Structure type: Underground

Other information
- Fare zone: 1 (ATM)

History
- Opened: 1926; 100 years ago

Services
Preceding station	Metro	Following station
Mercat Nou towards Hospital de Bellvitge	L1	Hostafrancs towards Fondo
Badal towards Cornellà Centre	L5	Sants Estació towards Vall d'Hebron
Location
- Location within Barcelona Location within Spain

Plaça de Sants (Catalan pronunciation: [ˈplasə ðə ˈsans]) is a Barcelona Metro station, named after the nearby Plaça de Sants, in the Sants-Montjuïc district of the city of Barcelona. The station is served by lines L1 and L5.

The line L1 platforms are located below the Carrer de Sants between the Carrer d'Alcolea and the Carrer de Guadiana, and comprise two 88-metre (289 ft) long side platforms. The line L5 platforms are some 200 metres (660 ft) to the west, under the Plaça de Sants between the Carrer de Sants and the Carrer Galileu, and comprise two 94-metre (308 ft) long side platforms. The two sets of platforms are linked by an underground corridor, and there are six station accesses on the Plaça de Sants and Carrer de Sants.

Plaça de Sants metro station lies some 10 minutes walk from Barcelona's main Sants railway station, which is better served by the Sants Estació metro station on lines L3 and L5.

The L1 part of the station is on the original section of line L1 (then the Ferrocarril Metropolitano Transversal de Barcelona) between Catalunya and Bordeta stations, which was opened in 1926. The L5 part was opened in 1969, along with the original section of L5 between Collblanc and Diagonal stations.

== See also ==
- List of Barcelona Metro stations
