= Hostafrancs station =

Metro station in Barcelona, Spain

Hostafrancs
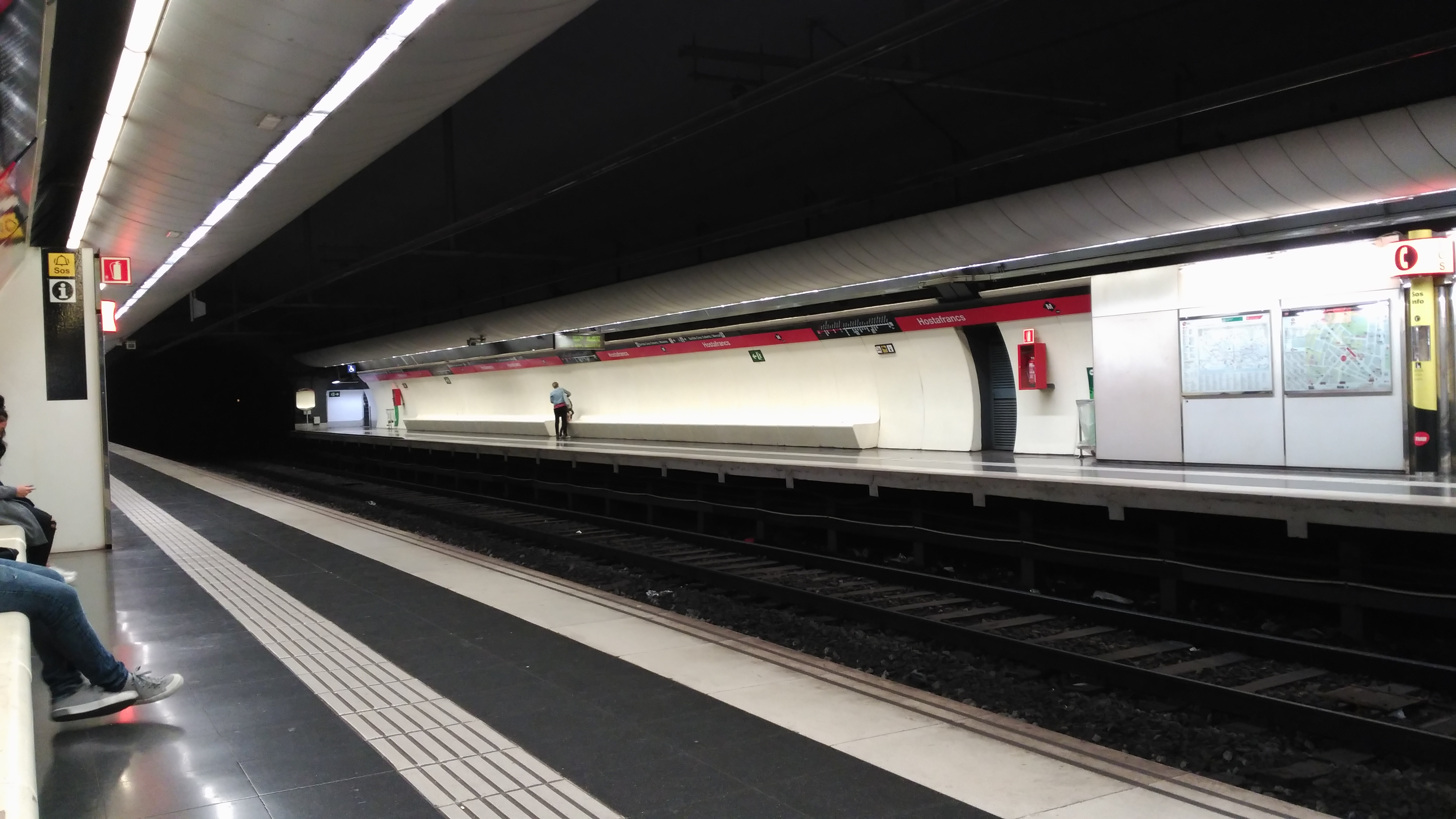
- The station's platforms

General information
- Location: Barcelona (Sants-Montjuïc)
- Coordinates: 41°22′31″N 2°8′37″E
- System: Barcelona Metro rapid transit station
- Owner: Transports Metropolitans de Barcelona
- Platforms: 2 side platforms
- Tracks: 2

Construction
- Structure type: Underground

Other information
- Fare zone: 1 (ATM)

History
- Opened: 1926; 100 years ago

Services
| Preceding station | Metro | Following station |
|---|---|---|
| Plaça de Sants towards Hospital de Bellvitge | L1 | Espanya towards Fondo |
Location
- Location within Barcelona Location within Spain

Hostafrancs (Catalan pronunciation: [ˌɔstəˈfɾaŋs]) is a Barcelona Metro station, named after the Hostafrancs neighbourhood, in the Sants-Montjuïc district of the city of Barcelona. The station is served by line L1. The station's name is still occasionally written as Hostafranchs, following the old Catalan spelling, chiefly in Spanish-language contexts.

The station is located under the Carrer de la Creu Coberta between the Carrer Moianès and Carrer Consell de Cent. The station can be accessed from entrances on all three streets. It has twin tracks, flanked by two 88-metre (289 ft) long and 4-metre (13 ft) wide side platforms.

Hostafrancs is on the original section of line L1 (then the Ferrocarril Metropolitano Transversal de Barcelona) between Catalunya and Bordeta stations, which was opened in 1926.

== See also ==
- List of Barcelona Metro stations
