= Universitat station (Barcelona) =

Metro station in Barcelona, Spain

Universitat
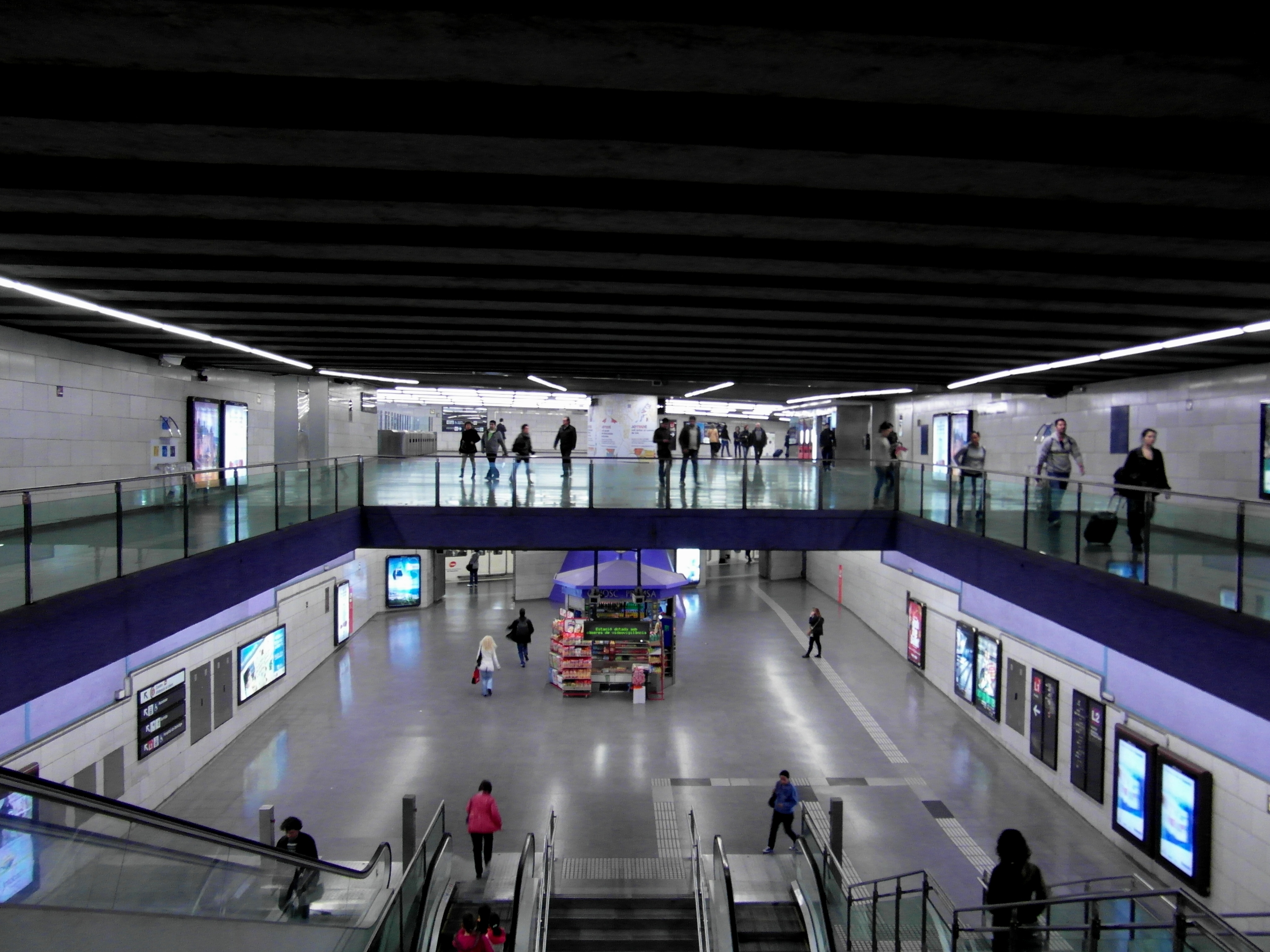
- The main hall of the station

General information
- Location: Plaça de la Universitat, s/n 08007 Barcelona
- Coordinates: 41°23′7.86″N 2°9′49.6″E
- System: Barcelona Metro rapid transit station
- Owner: Transports Metropolitans de Barcelona
- Platforms: 2 split platforms for line 1 and 2 side platforms for line 2
- Tracks: 4

Construction
- Structure type: Underground
- Platform levels: 2
- Accessible: yes

Other information
- Fare zone: 1 (ATM)

History
- Opened: 10 June 1926; 100 years ago (L1); 25 September 1995; 31 years ago (L2)

Services
Preceding station	Metro	Following station
Urgell towards Hospital de Bellvitge	L1	Catalunya towards Fondo
Sant Antoni towards Paral·lel	L2	Passeig de Gràcia towards Badalona Pompeu Fabra
Location
- Location within Barcelona Location within Spain

Universitat (Catalan pronunciation: [uniβərsiˈtat]) is a Barcelona Metro station named after Plaça de la Universitat, split between Eixample and Ciutat Vella districts of Barcelona, where the station is located in. This square holds the historical building of Universitat de Barcelona, celebrated for its neo-Gothic style. The station is accessible for disabled persons since 1995, when Barcelona Metro line 2 opened its platforms. It is served by TMB-operated Barcelona Metro lines L1 and L2.

== Line 1 ==
Barcelona Metro line 1 station was opened on 10 June 1926 as part of the original section of Ferrocarril Metropolità Transversal between the former station of Bordeta and Plaça de Catalunya station. The former metro station was very different from this one and was similar to Urgell and Rocafort metro stations. The metro station was closed between 1971 and 1972 when the new rail link between Sants railway station and Plaça de Catalunya was built, which passes very close to the metro station. This forced to change the original composition of the platforms to two platforms situated one above the other. The current station was opened on 23 December 1972, is located under Plaça de la Universitat and has two levels. The upper level has a large hall that is used by line 2 too and has some commercial areas and a customer office. On the same level there is one of the platforms while the other one is situated on the lower level.

== Line 2 ==
Barcelona Metro line 2 station was opened on 25 September 1995 with the opening of the line between Sant Antoni and Sagrada Família metro stations. The station is located under Ronda de Sant Antoni, between Sepúlveda and Aribau streets. On the upper level there is a large hall which is the same for line 1 and it is connected directly with line 1 platform toward Hospital de Bellvitge. There is also an intermediate hall which connects directly with line 1 platform toward Fondo. The trains run on the lower level into two separated naves where each one holds a platform. Line 2 station was built completely adapted for disabled persons.
