= Urgell station =

Metro station in Barcelona, Spain

Urgell
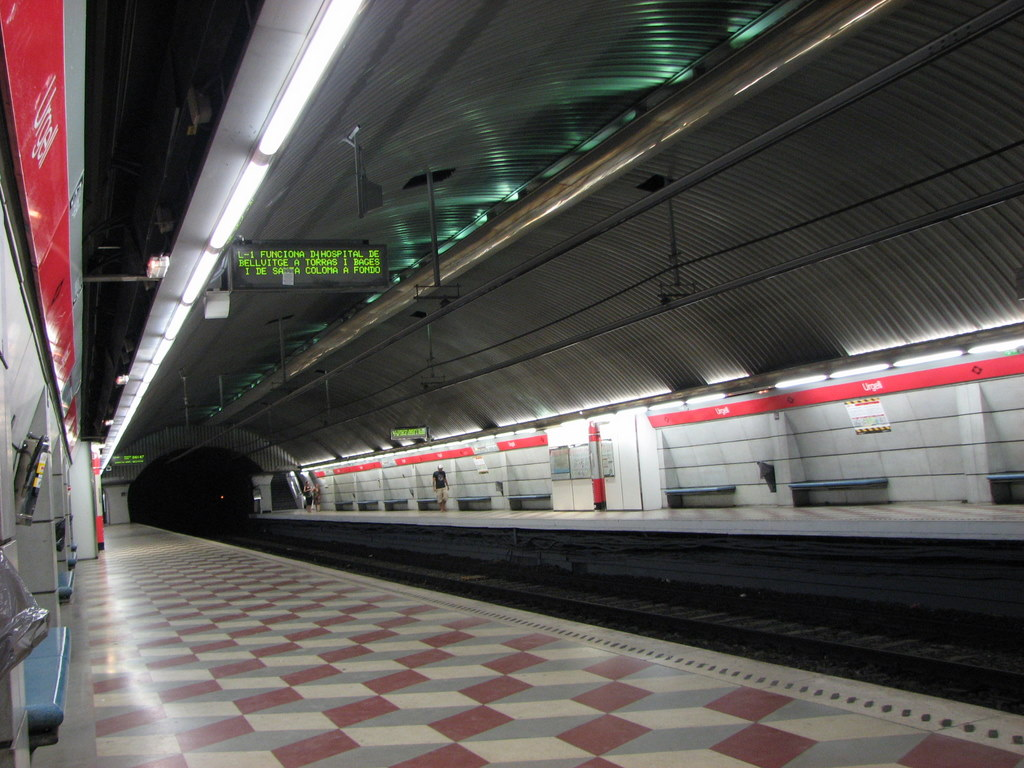
- The station's platforms, with their characteristic floor tiles

General information
- Location: Barcelona (Eixample)
- Coordinates: 41°22′56″N 2°9′32″E
- System: Barcelona Metro rapid transit station
- Owner: Transports Metropolitans de Barcelona
- Platforms: 2 side platforms
- Tracks: 2

Construction
- Structure type: Underground

Other information
- Fare zone: 1 (ATM)

History
- Opened: 1926; 100 years ago

Services
Preceding station	Metro	Following station
Rocafort towards Hospital de Bellvitge	L1	Universitat towards Fondo
Location
- Location within Barcelona Location within Spain

Urgell (Catalan pronunciation: [urˈʒeʎ]) is a Barcelona Metro station, named after the Carrer del Comte d'Urgell, in the Eixample district of the city of Barcelona. The station is served by line L1.

The station is located under the Gran Via de les Corts Catalanes between the Carrer del Comte d'Urgell and the Carrer de Villarroel. The station can be accessed from entrances on the Gran Via, the Comte d'Urgell and the Carrer de Villarroel. It has twin tracks, flanked by two 88-metre (289 ft) long side platforms.

Urgell is one of the oldest metro stations in the city, as it is part of the first section of line L1 (then the Ferrocarril Metropolitano Transversal de Barcelona) between Catalunya and Bordeta stations, which was opened in 1926.

== See also ==
- List of Barcelona Metro stations
- Urgell (the comarca or county the station is ultimately named after).
- Counts of Urgell
