= Mercat Nou station =

Metro station in Barcelona, Spain

Mercat Nou
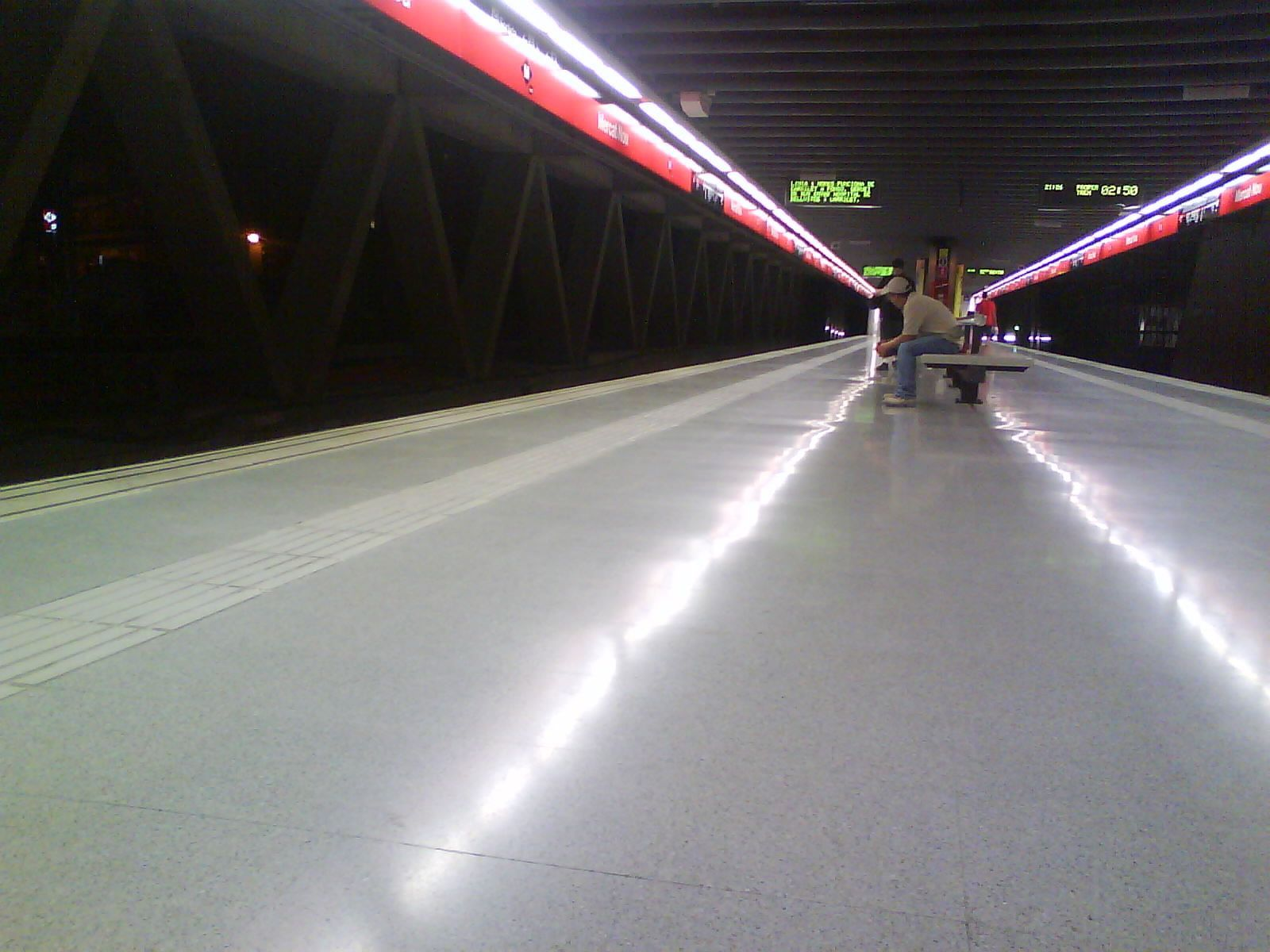

General information
- Location: Barcelona (Sants-Montjuïc)
- Coordinates: 41°22′24″N 2°8′2″E
- System: Barcelona Metro rapid transit station
- Owner: Transports Metropolitans de Barcelona

Construction
- Structure type: Above ground but fully enclosed

Other information
- Fare zone: 1 (ATM)

History
- Opened: 1926; 100 years ago

Services
Preceding station	Metro	Following station
Santa Eulàlia towards Hospital de Bellvitge	L1	Plaça de Sants towards Fondo
Location
- Location within Barcelona Location within Spain

Mercat Nou (Catalan pronunciation: [mərˈkad ˈnɔw]) is a Barcelona Metro station in the Sants-Montjuïc district of the city of Barcelona. The station is served by line L1. It was formerly called Mercado Nuevo until 1982.

The station is situated above street level, alongside the main line tracks from the western exit of Sants railway station, and between Carrer Riera de Tena and Carrer Jocs Florals. The station's only entrance is at its western end, from a ticket hall below the tracks accessed from Carrer Riera de Tena as it passes under the tracks. Escalators, stairs and lifts take passengers up to the 100-metre (330 ft) long island platform. Despite being above street level, both main line and metro tracks, and the metro platforms, are fully enclosed.

The station is on the original section of line L1 (then the Ferrocarril Metropolitano Transversal de Barcelona) between Catalunya and Bordeta stations, which was opened in 1926. As built, the station was one of the system's few open-air stations, with a pair of side platforms. However both the metro line and the adjacent main lines were rebuilt and enclosed over a two-year period up to June 2009, during this period the station was closed. According to Barcelona City Council the work cost €15.6 million.

== Gallery ==
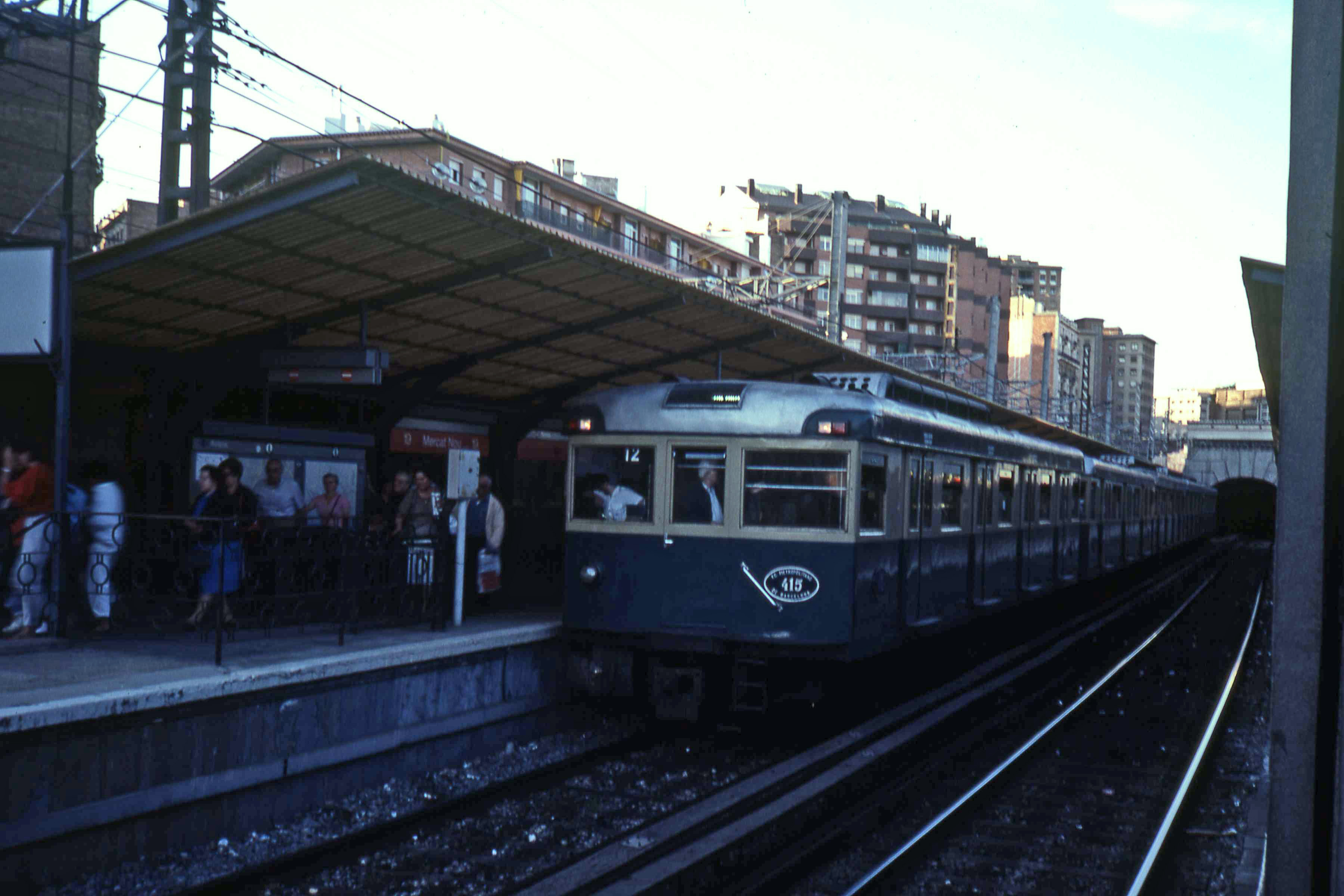
A 400 series train at the station in 1987

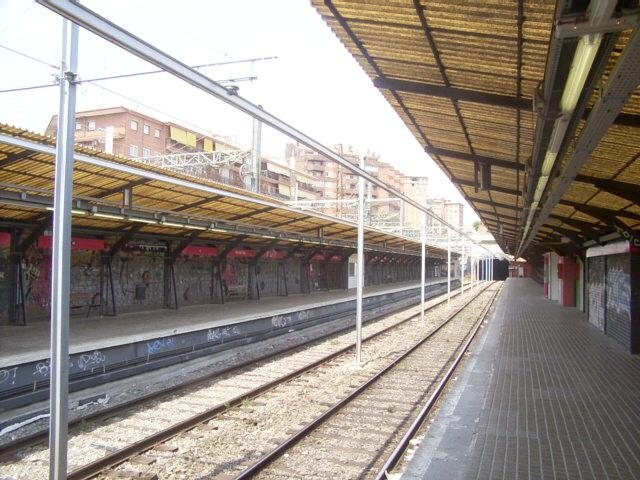
The station's platforms in 2002, before remodelling
