= Carrer de Sants, Barcelona =

High street in Barcelona, Catalonia, Spain

Coordinates: 41°22′32″N 2°07′58″E

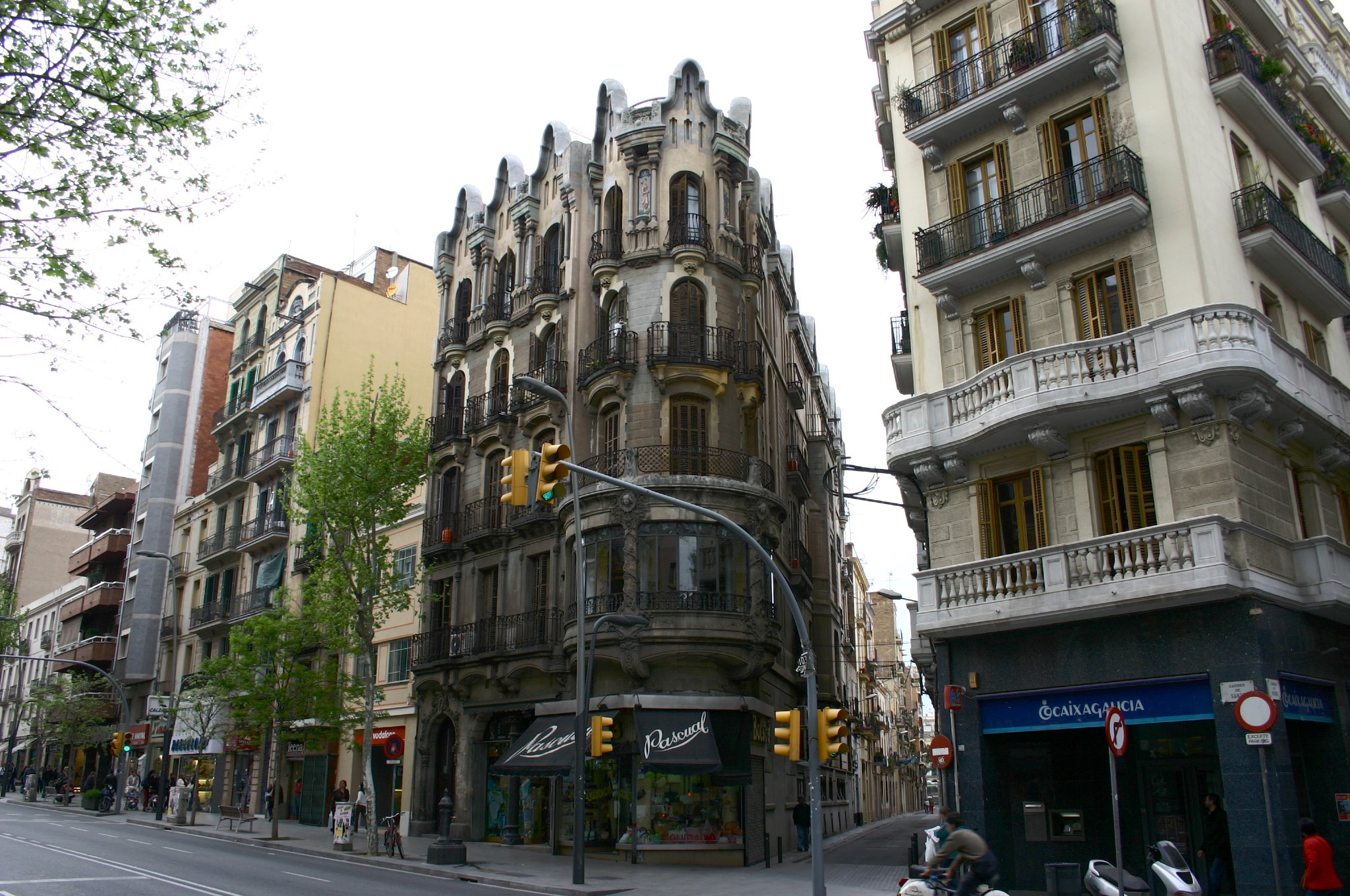
Carrer de Sants features a mixture of 19th and 20th century architectural styles.

Carrer de Sants is a high street in the eponymous neighbourhood of Sants, in Barcelona (Catalonia, Spain). After being designated officially a commercial road in 1999 by shopkeepers' associations of its district, it is often claimed to be Europe's longest commercial road, spanning also Carrer de la Creu Coberta (which is essentially the same street). The Sants-Montjuïc district council has its seat there.

== Names and history ==
The street's name stems from the old parish of Santa Maria de Sants, the neighbourhood's patron saint. It is often referred to as Carretera de Sants, especially by locals, which reveals the street's origins as an 18th-century road from Barcelona to the then village of Sants. The incorporation of Sants into Barcelona took place in 1897 by order of regent Infanta Maria Cristina of Spain. Then it became the very core of the much industrialised, proletarian Sants. Before 1900 it was variously called Carretera de Madrid or Carretera Real. Past Carrer de la Riera Blanca, where Barcelona borders its suburb L'Hospitalet de Llobregat, it becomes Carrer de Collblanc, which follows pretty much the same direction.

== Transport ==
It can be reached via Barcelona Metro stations Espanya (L1, L3, L8 and FGC), Hostafrancs (L1), Plaça de Sants (L1, L5), Badal (L5) and Collblanc (L5).

== See also ==
- List of streets and squares in Sants-Montjuïc
