= Rocafort station (Barcelona) =

Metro station in Barcelona, Spain

Rocafort
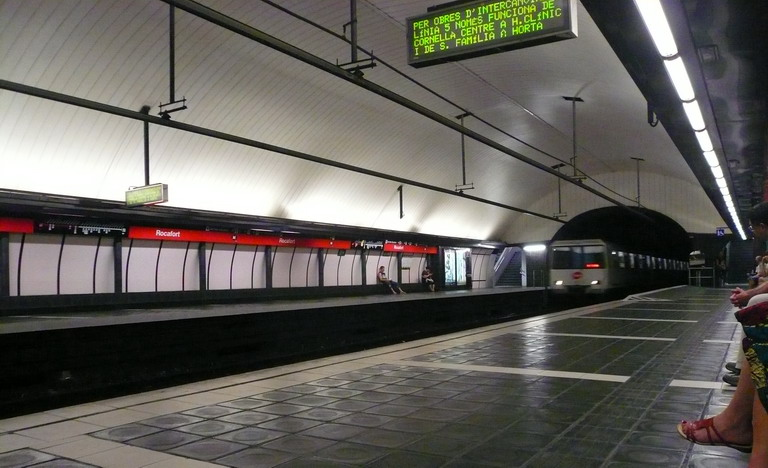
- The station's interior as seen from the platforms

General information
- Location: Barcelona (Eixample)
- Coordinates: 41°22′44″N 2°9′16″E
- System: Barcelona Metro rapid transit station
- Owner: Transports Metropolitans de Barcelona
- Platforms: 2 side platforms
- Tracks: 2

Construction
- Structure type: Underground

Other information
- Fare zone: 1 (ATM)

History
- Opened: 1926; 100 years ago

Services
Preceding station	Metro	Following station
Espanya towards Hospital de Bellvitge	L1	Urgell towards Fondo
Location
- Location within Barcelona Location within Province of Barcelona Location within Spain

Rocafort (Catalan pronunciation: [ˌrɔkəˈfɔrt]) is a Barcelona Metro station, named after the Carrer de Rocafort, in the Eixample district of the city of Barcelona. The station is served by line L1.

The station is located under the Gran Via de les Corts Catalanes between the Carrer de Rocafort and the Carrer de Calàbria. The station can be accessed from entrances on the Gran Via, the Carrer de Rocafort and the Carrer de Calàbria. It has twin tracks, flanked by two 88-metre (289 ft) long side platforms.

Rocafort is on the original section of line L1 (then the Ferrocarril Metropolitano Transversal de Barcelona) between Catalunya and Bordeta stations, which was opened in 1926.

== Urban Legend ==
The perception of Rocafort Station as a cursed place has deeply rooted itself in Barcelona. Workers from Transports Metropolitans de Barcelona (TMB) avoid being assigned to this station due to legends that speak of mysterious voices in the tunnels around midnight.

The station, with its flickering lights and dimly lit corridors, has been the setting for local horror stories. According to these legends, Rocafort has a malevolent influence that lures the desperate to their end. This reputation has generated numerous urban tales, consolidating the station’s image as a place surrounded by mystery and fear.

== In popular culture ==
Rocafort Station appears in the Spanish psychological horror film Estación Rocafort (2024). In the film, the Barcelona metro station becomes a key setting where part of the plot unfolds. The movie is inspired by the dark legend of Rocafort Station. It is directed by Luis Prieto and stars Natalia Azahara alongside Javier Gutiérrez, Valèria Sorolla, and Albert Baró.
