= Sants Estació (Barcelona Metro) =

Metro station in Barcelona, Spain

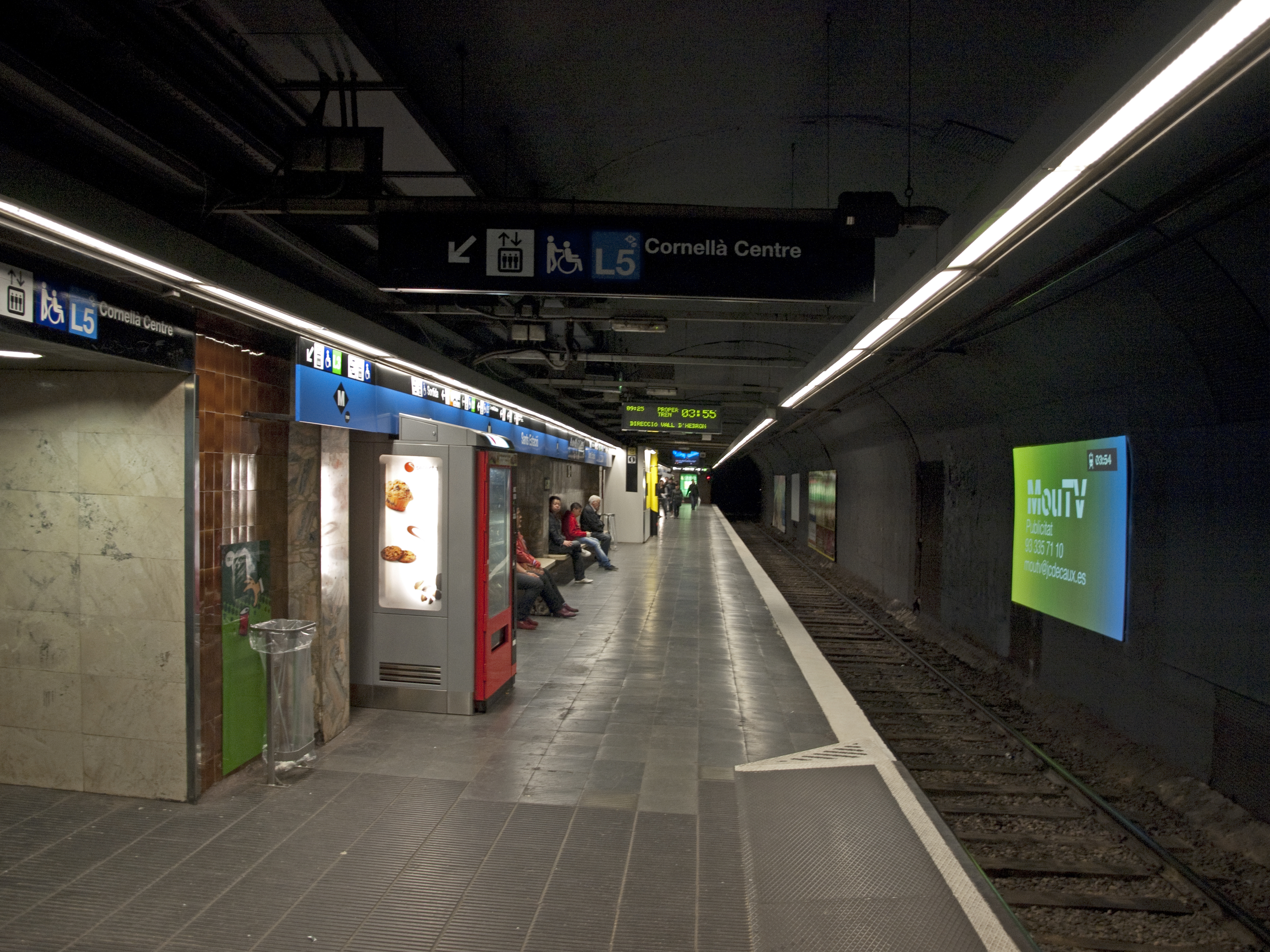
- The line L5 platforms

General information
- Location: Barcelona (Sants-Montjuïc)
- Coordinates: 41.380586°N 2.140598°E
- System: Barcelona Metro rapid transit station
- Operator: Transports Metropolitans de Barcelona

Other information
- Fare zone: 1 (ATM)

History
- Opened: 1969

Services
Preceding station	Metro	Following station
Plaça del Centre towards Zona Universitària	L3	Tarragona towards Trinitat Nova
Plaça de Sants towards Cornellà Centre	L5	Entença towards Vall d'Hebron
Location
- Location within Barcelona Location within Province of Barcelona Location within Spain

Sants Estació (Catalan pronunciation: [ˈsanz əstəsiˈo]) is a station in the Barcelona Metro network in the Sants-Montjuïc district of Barcelona. It serves the Barcelona Sants railway station, Barcelona's principal main line railway station, and is named Sants Estació to distinguish it from the nearby Plaça de Sants station, also named after the Sants neighbourhood. It is served by line L3 and line L5.

The line L3 section of the station is situated under Numància street, between Melcior Palau and Avinguda Josep Tarradellas. It has a hall at each side of the station. To access to the railway station it is necessary to go through line 5 hall. The station is equipped with numerous elevators, and has two side platforms that are 95 metres (312 ft) in length.

The line L5 section of the station was opened in 1969 with the opening of the line between Collblanc and Diagonal. The metro station is situated on the north part of the railway station, between Guitard and Enric Bargés streets. The station is complex but has an own hall on the west side which has two direct accesses to the railway station. It has two side platforms that are 94 metres (308 ft) in length. On the other side of the station there is the corridor to connect with line 3.

Sants Estació is one of three stations where lines L3 and L5 connect, the others being Diagonal and Vall d'Hebron metro stations. Like both these two stations, the platforms of the two lines at Sants Estació are connected by an underground passageway. However, unlike the other two, there is also a single track connection between the two lines at Sants Estació.

The line L5 station was opened in 1969 with the opening of the line between Collblanc and Diagonal, whilst the line L3 station followed in 1975 with the opening of the line from this station to Zona Universitària. A second access hall to the L3 station was added in 2004.

== Gallery ==
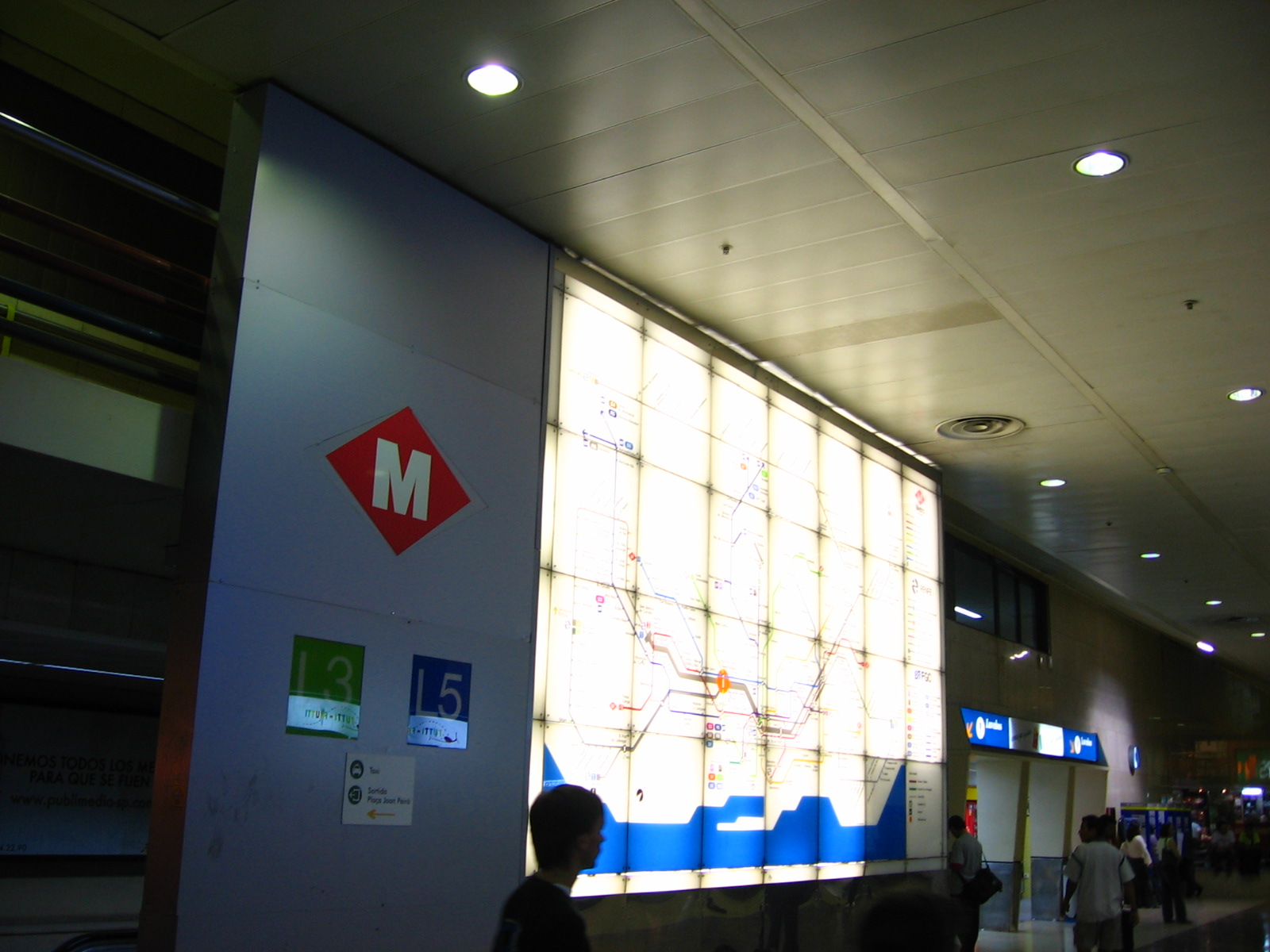
Large illuminated metro map at entrance to the metro station from the main line concourse

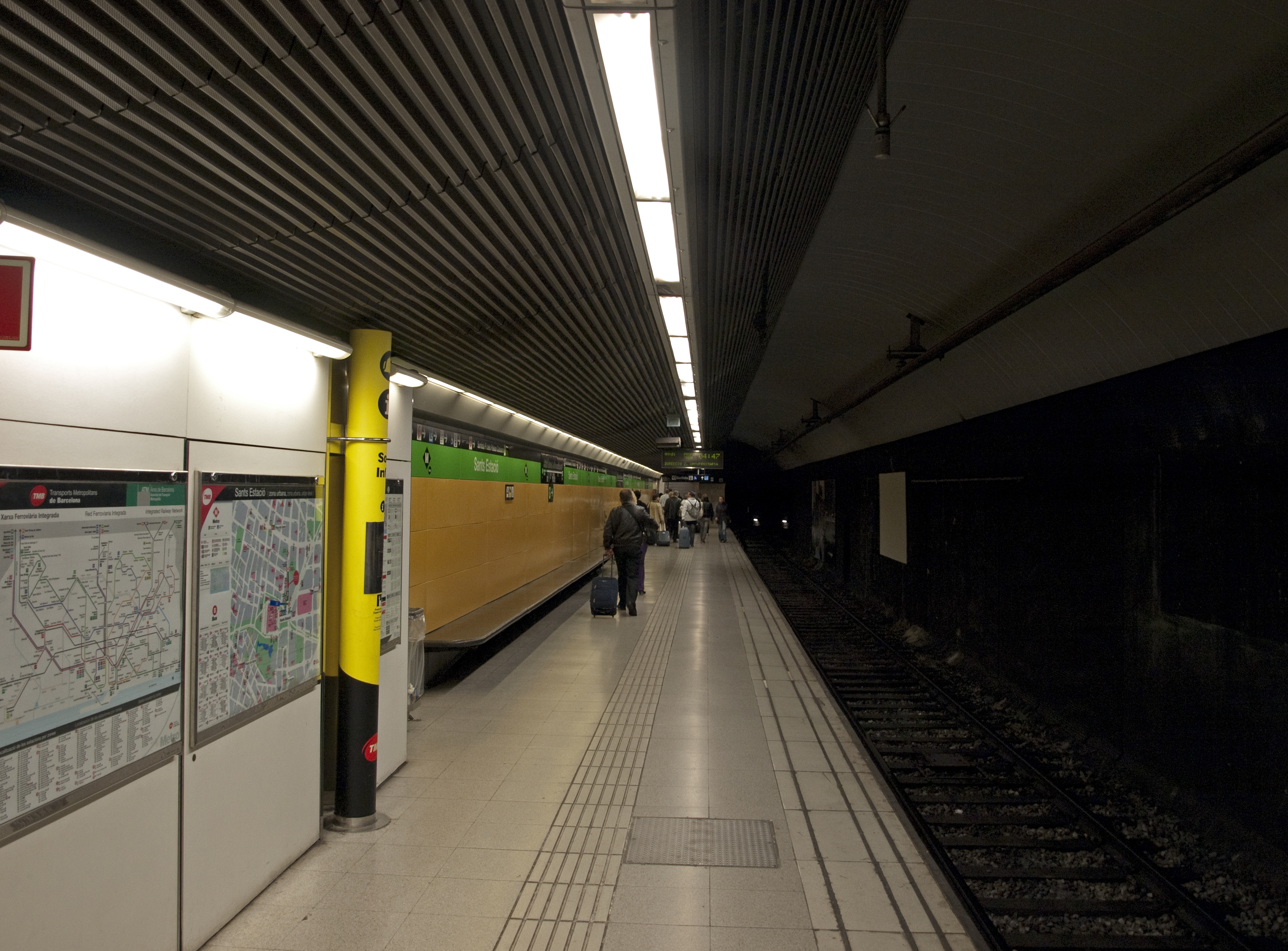
The line L3 platforms
