= Feixa Llarga =

Feixa Llarga may refer to:

- Estadi La Feixa Llarga, a football stadium in L'Hospitalet de Llobregat, Catalonia, Spain
- Feixa Llarga metro station, a station on the Barcelona Metro that is now known as Hospital de Bellvitge
