= Santa Eulàlia station =

Metro station in Barcelona, Spain

Santa Eulàlia
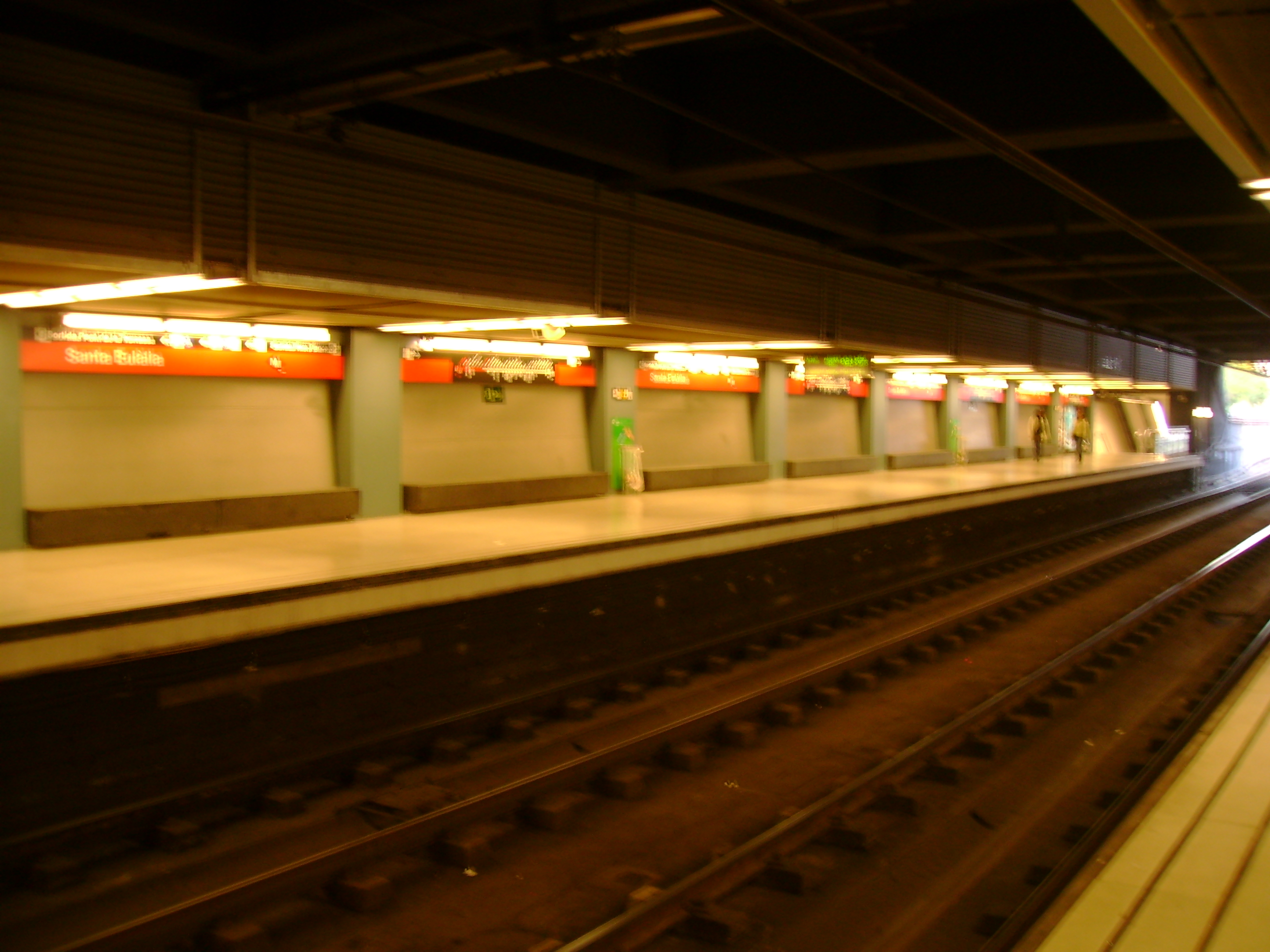

General information
- Location: L'Hospitalet de Llobregat
- Coordinates: 41.3686°N 2.1275°E
- System: Barcelona Metro rapid transit station
- Owner: Transports Metropolitans de Barcelona

Construction
- Structure type: Above ground with overall roof

Other information
- Fare zone: 1 (ATM)

History
- Opened: 1932; 94 years ago
- Rebuilt: 1983; 43 years ago (on new site)

Services
Preceding station	Metro	Following station
Torrassa towards Hospital de Bellvitge	L1	Mercat Nou towards Fondo
Location
- Location within Barcelona Location within Province of Barcelona Location within Spain

Santa Eulàlia (Catalan pronunciation: [ˈsantə əwˈlali.ə]) is a Barcelona Metro station, just inside the boundary of the municipality of L'Hospitalet de Llobregat with the city of Barcelona, and named after the nearby Santa Eulàlia neighbourhood. The station is served by line L1.

The station is situated alongside the south side of main line tracks from the western exit of Sants railway station, with the Pont de La Torrassa to the west and the Riera Blanca to the east. It has two 96-metre (315 ft) long side platforms, which are situated above street level at their eastern end and below ground at the western end, and has an overall roof. Both platforms have access from a below-track ticket hall on the Riera Blanca, and an above-track ticket hall linked to the Pont de La Torrassa. The Santa Eulàlia metro train depot is immediately to the south of the station.

The station has existed on two different sites. The first, somewhat to the west of the current site, was opened in 1932 as the western terminus of a one stop extension of line L1 from Bordeta station. The station was relocated in 1983, at the time of the further extension of the line to Torrassa station. At the same time, Bordeta station was closed, as it was deemed too close to the new Santa Eulàlia station.
