= Bellvitge =

Coordinates: 41.35078°N 2.11111°E

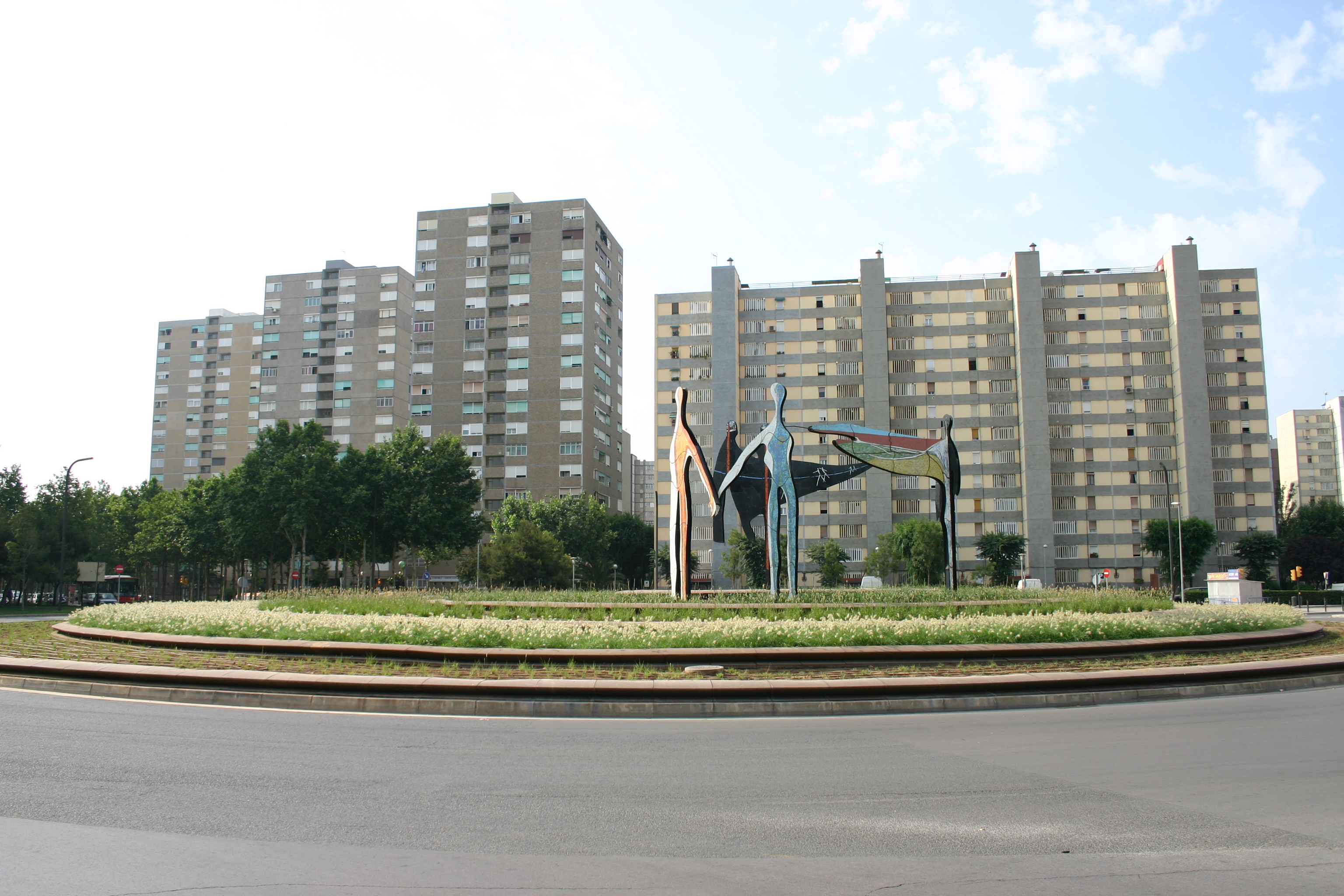
A roundabout in Bellvitge.

Bellvitge (Catalan pronunciation: [ˌbeʎˈβidʒə]) is a mostly working-class neighborhood in L'Hospitalet de Llobregat, belonging to the metropolitan area of Barcelona. It is part of L'Hospitalet's District VI, along with Gornal.

Bellvitge is situated at a height of 4 to 8 meters above sea level. It borders the cities of Cornellà de Llobregat, El Prat de Llobregat and Barcelona on the west and south; El Gornal neighborhood in the east, with El Centre to the north.

== History ==
In 1964, the real estate agency Inmobiliaria Ciudad Condal S.A. (ICC) initiated the construction of this neighbourhood as it stands nowadays, beside the hermitage, on land which had been bought from local farmers. It was designed as a residential area to house the large number of people who came to Catalonia and Barcelona from elsewhere in Spain in the 1960s to work in the bustling automotive industry.

== People from Bellvitge ==
- Xavi Fernández: Professional basketball player
- Alberto Lopo: footballer (Deportivo de La Coruña)
- Iban Salvador, footballer (Real Valladolid)

== Transport ==
- Bellvitge railway station
- Barcelona Metro stations Bellvitge and Hospital de Bellvitge, on L1.
