= Tarragona station =

Tarragona station may refer to:

- Tarragona station (Barcelona), in the city of Barcelona, Catalonia, Spain
- Tarragona railway station, in the city of Tarragona, Catalonia, Spain
