= Hostafrancs =

Coordinates: 41°22′32.56″N 2°8′35.49″E

- Neighborhood of Barcelona
- Interactive map of Hostafrancs
- Country: Spain
- Autonomous community: Catalonia
- Province: Barcelona
- Comarca: Barcelonès
- Municipality: Barcelona
- District: Sants-Montjuïc

Area
  - Total: 0.41 km^{2} (0.16 sq mi)

Population
  - Total: 15,915
  - Density: 39,000/km^{2} (100,000/sq mi)

Hostafrancs (Catalan pronunciation: [ˌɔstəˈfɾaŋs]) is a neighbourhood in the Sants-Montjuïc district of Barcelona, Catalonia, Spain.

Originally the neighbourhood's land belonged to the former municipality of Santa Maria de Sants, the current district. In 1839, the Provincial Council transferred the sector that went from Pont d'en Rabassa to Creu Coberta to Barcelona.

The Hostafrancs metro station, on Barcelona Metro line L1, is located in the middle of the neighbourhood. The Plaça d'Espanya, along with the Espanya metro and railway station, lies on the eastern edge of the neighbourhood. Barcelona's main Sants railway station is just outside the neighbourhood, to the north.
