= Tarragona station (Barcelona) =

Metro station in Barcelona, Spain

Tarragona
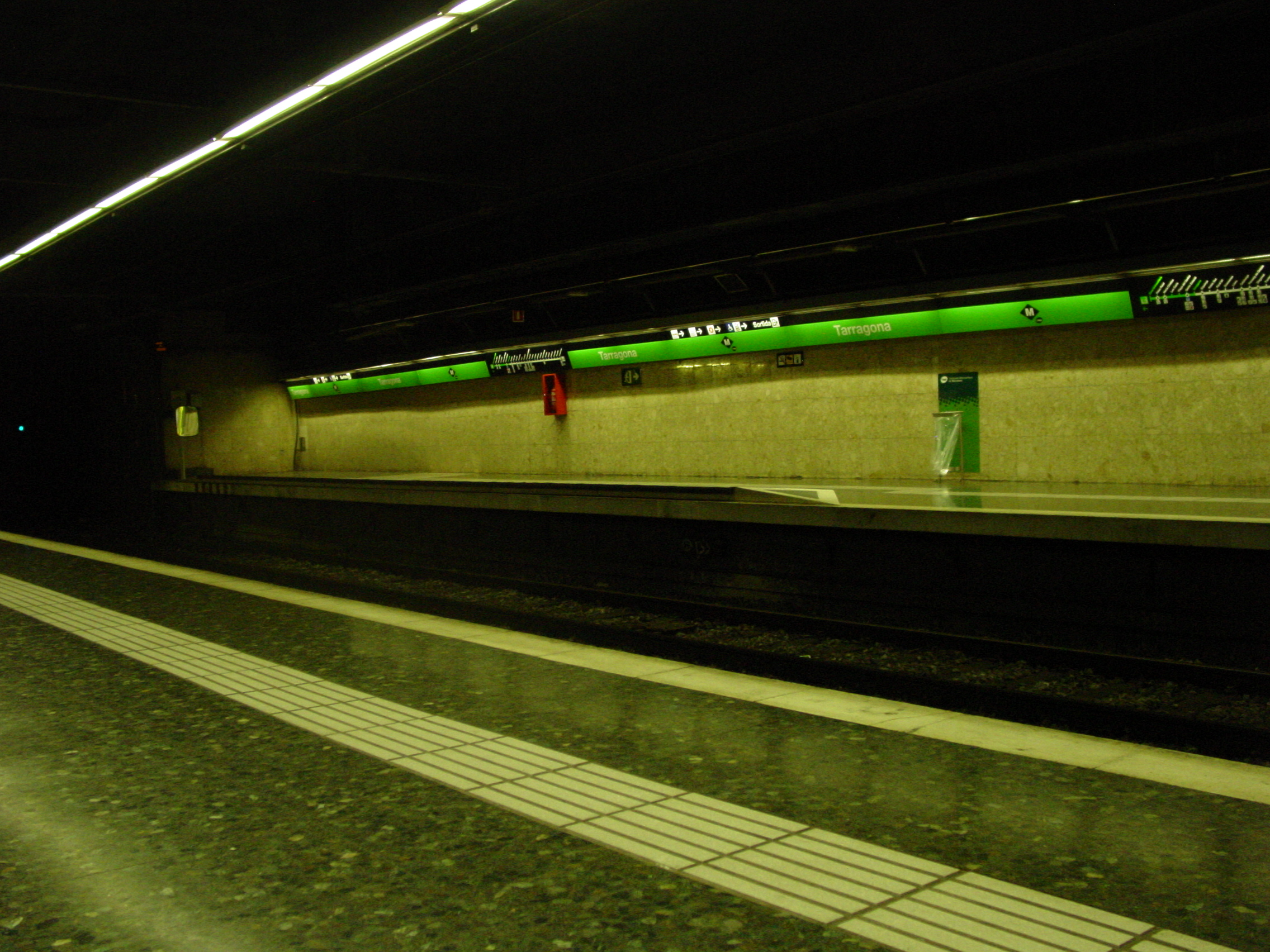
- Platform view of Tarragona station

General information
- Location: Barcelona (Sants-Montjuïc)
- Coordinates: 41°22′42″N 2°8′42″E
- System: Barcelona Metro rapid transit station
- Operator: Transports Metropolitans de Barcelona
- Platforms: 2 side platforms

Other information
- Fare zone: 1 (ATM)

History
- Opened: 1975

Services
Preceding station	Metro	Following station
Sants Estació towards Zona Universitària	L3	Espanya towards Trinitat Nova
Location
- Location within Barcelona Location within Spain

Tarragona (Catalan pronunciation: [tərəˈɣonə]) is a station in the Barcelona Metro network in the Sants-Montjuïc district of Barcelona. It is served by line L3 (green line).

The station is located under Carrer de Tarragona between Carrer de València and Carrer d'Aragó, not far from Barcelona Sants railway station. Station entrances are situated at the junctions of the Carrer de Tarragona with Carrer de València, Carrer d'Aragó, Carrer de l'Elisi and Carrer de Sant Nicolau. In the vestibule served by the southern entrance is the artwork Tres Boles by José Luis Carcedo Vidal. At the lower level, the station has two tracks served by two side platforms.

The station opened in 1975, along with the other stations of the section of L3 between Paral·lel and Sants Estació stations. This section was originally operated separately from L3, and known as L3b, until the two sections were joined in 1982.
