= Bellvitge station =

Bellvitge station may refer to:

- Bellvitge station (Barcelona Metro), a Barcelona Metro line 1 station in L'Hospitalet de Llobregat, Catalonia, Spain
- Bellvitge railway station, a Rodalies de Catalunya station in L'Hospitalet de Llobregat, Catalonia, Spain
