= Bellvitge University Hospital =

- Institut Català de la Salut (Catalan Health Institute)

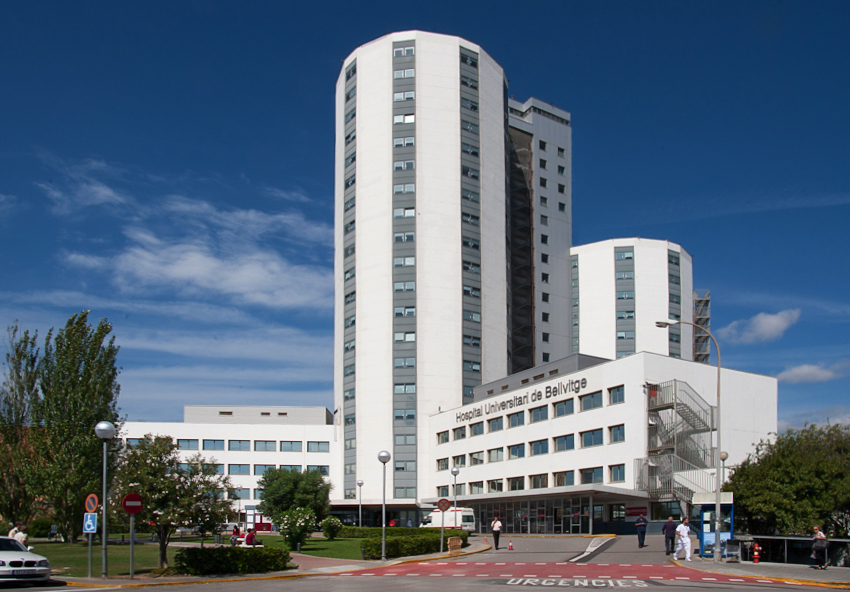

- Location within Catalonia

Geography
- Location: L'Hospitalet de Llobregat, Spain
- Coordinates: 41.344861°N 2.104244°E

Organisation
- Care system: CatSalut
- Type: Teaching

Links
- Website: www.bellvitgehospital.cat/en_index.html
- Lists: Hospitals in Spain

The Bellvitge University Hospital (in Catalan Hospital Universitari de Bellvitge) is a public hospital located in town of l'Hospitalet de Llobregat, with care, teaching and researching activity. It is specialized in high complexity medical care. It offers all the medical specialties, except for pediatrics and obstetrics.

The hospital is served by the Hospital de Bellvitge metro station, on line L1 of the Barcelona Metro, which is located under the hospital car park.
