= Torrassa station =

Metro station in Barcelona, Spain

Torrassa
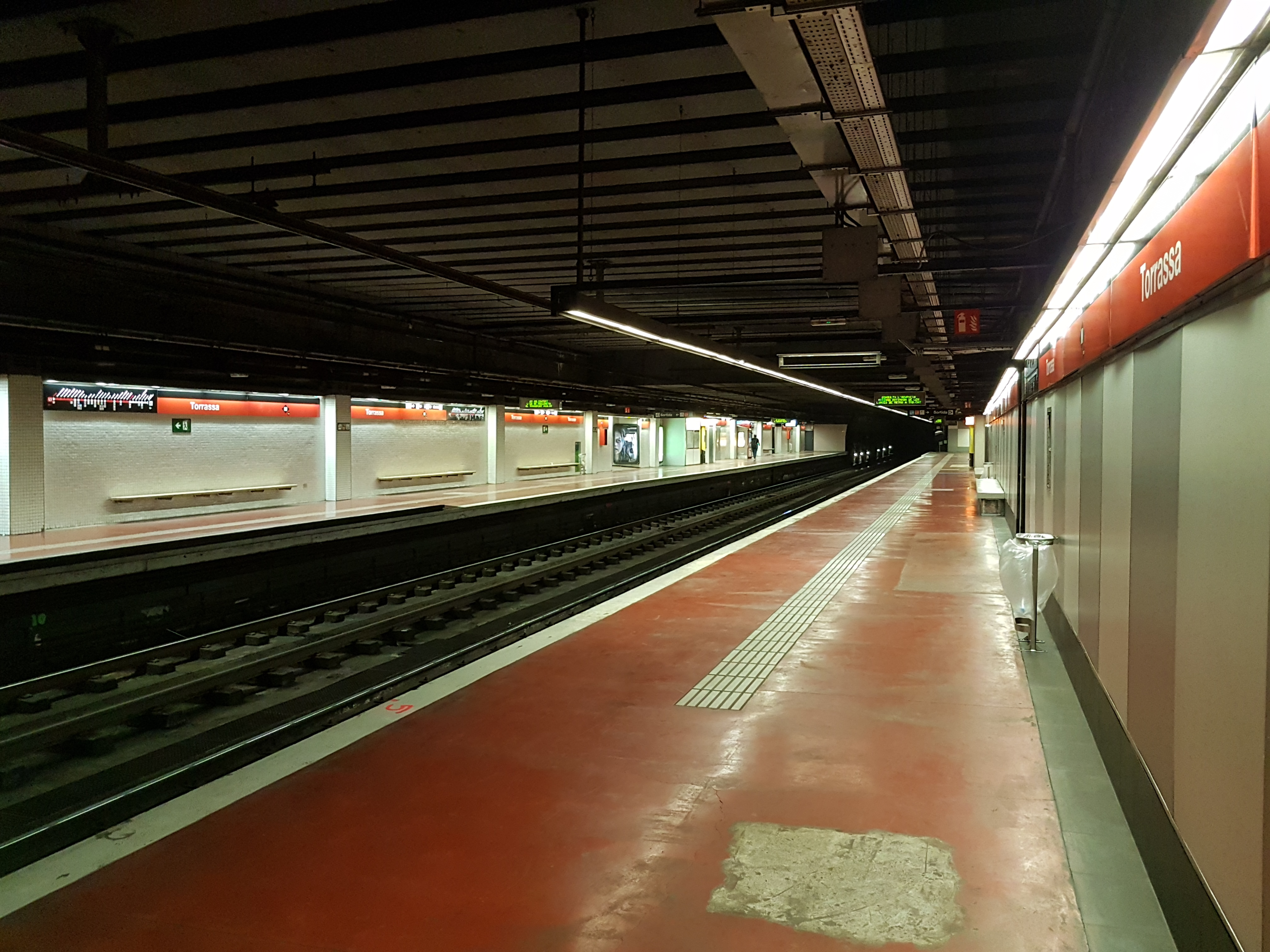
- Line 1 platforms

General information
- Location: L'Hospitalet de Llobregat
- Coordinates: 41°22′07″N 2°06′58″E
- System: Barcelona Metro rapid transit station
- Owner: Transports Metropolitans de Barcelona

Construction
- Structure type: Underground

Other information
- Fare zone: 1 (ATM)

History
- Opened: 1983; 43 years ago

Services
Preceding station	Metro	Following station
Florida towards Hospital de Bellvitge	L1	Santa Eulàlia towards Fondo
Can Tries | Gornal towards Airport T1	L9 Sud	Collblanc towards Zona Universitària
Can Tries | Gornal towards ZAL | Riu Vell	L10 Sud	Collblanc Terminus
Location
- Location within Barcelona Location within Spain

Torrassa (Catalan pronunciation: [tuˈrasə]) is a Barcelona Metro station, in the L'Hospitalet de Llobregat municipality of the Barcelona metropolitan area, and named after the nearby La Torrassa neighbourhood. The station is served by line L1, line L9 and line L10.

The station is located underneath the Avinguda Catalunya, between the carrer d'Almeria and carrer de Rosalía de Castro. There are two entrances, from Avinguda Torrent Gornal and Carrer d'Almeria, which serve a below ground ticket hall. The two 96-metre (315 ft) long side platforms are at a lower level.

The station was opened in 1983, at the time of the extension of line L1 from Santa Eulàlia station. It remained the terminus of the line until 1987, when line L1 was further extended to Avinguda Carrilet station.

Future plans are for Torrassa station to a link to a new Rodalies de Catalunya commuter rail station between L'Hospitalet de Llobregat and Barcelona Sants stations.
