= Estadi Municipal de Futbol de L'Hospitalet =

Football stadium in Spain

Estadi Municipal de l'Hospitalet
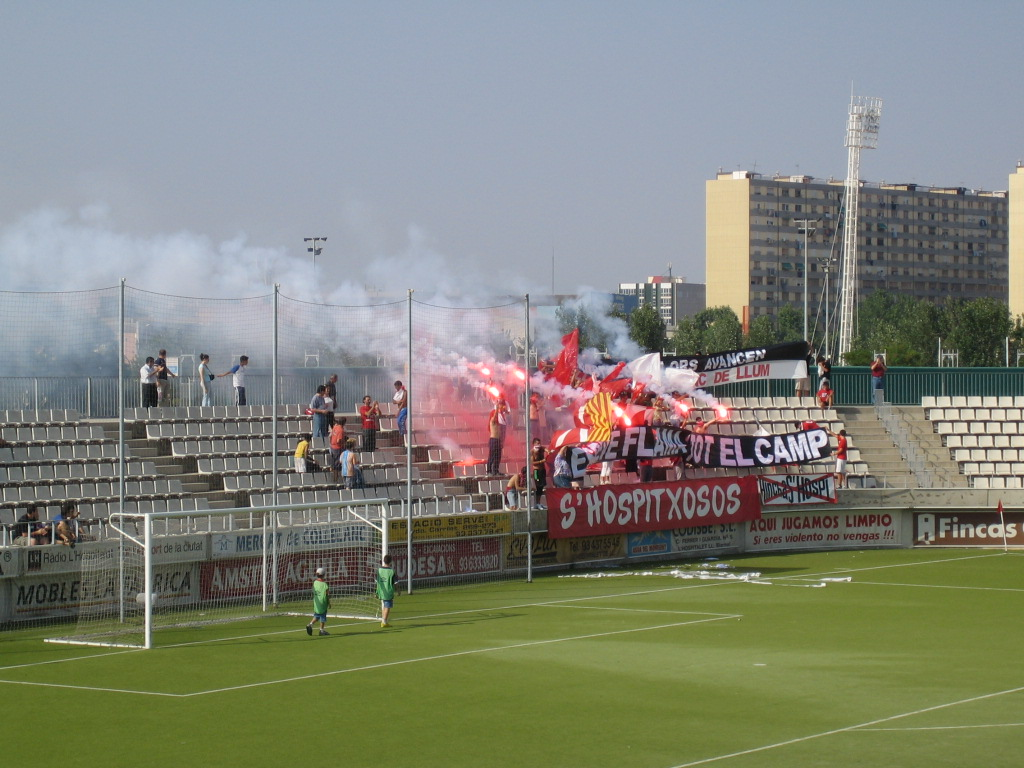
- Interactive map of Estadi Municipal de l'Hospitalet
- Full name: Estadi Municipal de Futbol de l'Hospitalet
- Location: L'Hospitalet de Llobregat, Catalonia, Spain
- Coordinates: 41°20′49″N 2°06′06″E
- Operator: L'Hospitalet
- Capacity: 6,740
- Surface: Grass
- Field size: 102 m × 68 m (335 ft × 223 ft)

Construction
- Opened: 1991
- Renovated: 1999
- Expanded: 1992

Tenant
- CE L'Hospitalet

The Estadi Municipal de Futbol de L'Hospitalet is a football stadium located in the Feixa Llarga district of L'Hospitalet de Llobregat, Catalonia, Spain. It was opened in 1999. It has a capacity of 6740 seated spectators. Currently it is the home of football club CE L'Hospitalet. The stadium is some 700 metres (2,300 ft) from the Hospital de Bellvitge metro station, on line L1 of the Barcelona Metro.

The stadium was originally built to host the baseball tournament at the 1992 Summer Olympics and designed by Spanish architect Mario Correa. It was later reconverted to a football stadium in 1999.

It is part of a municipal sports complex known as Feixa Llarga - which includes other facilities such as a rugby field and a sports center - and that is why the Municipal Stadium is sometimes referred to as Feixa Llarga. However, the Estadi Municipal de L'Hospitalet should not be confused with the Camp Municipal de la Feixa Llarga, headquarters of the UD Unificación Bellvitge, which is located a few meters away, within the same sports complex.

== Prior usage ==
L'Hospitalet de Llobregat Baseball Stadium was originally a baseball stadium. The venue, opened in July 1991 and seating 2500, was one of two used for baseball competitions at the 1992 Summer Olympics in Barcelona, including the finals.

During the 1992 games, seating was expanded to just under 7000.

The stadium also was one of the venues where the 2002 Women's Rugby World Cup was played.
