= Bordeta station =

Closed station of Barcellona's underground

Bordeta

General information
- Location: La Bordeta, Sants-Montjuïc, Barcelona
- Coordinates: 41.370427°N 2.131165°E
- System: Barcelona Metro rapid transit station
- Owner: Transports Metropolitans de Barcelona
- Platforms: 2 side platforms
- Tracks: 2

Construction
- Structure type: Underground

History
- Opened: 1926
- Closed: 1983
Location
- Location within Barcelona Location within Spain

Bordeta was a former station on Barcelona Metro line L1, in the Sants-Montjuïc district of the Spanish city of Barcelona. The station site is between the current stations of Mercat Nou and Santa Eulàlia.

Bordeta was opened in 1926, as the western terminus of the original section of line L1 to Catalunya station. It ceased to be a terminus in 1932, when the line was extended one stop west to the first Santa Eulàlia station. It closed in 1983, with the relocation of Santa Eulàlia station and opening of the westward extension of the line to Torrassa station, as it was deemed too close to the new Santa Eulàlia station.

== See also ==
- List of disused Barcelona Metro stations
