= Bellvitge station (Barcelona Metro) =

Metro station in Barcelona, Spain

Bellvitge
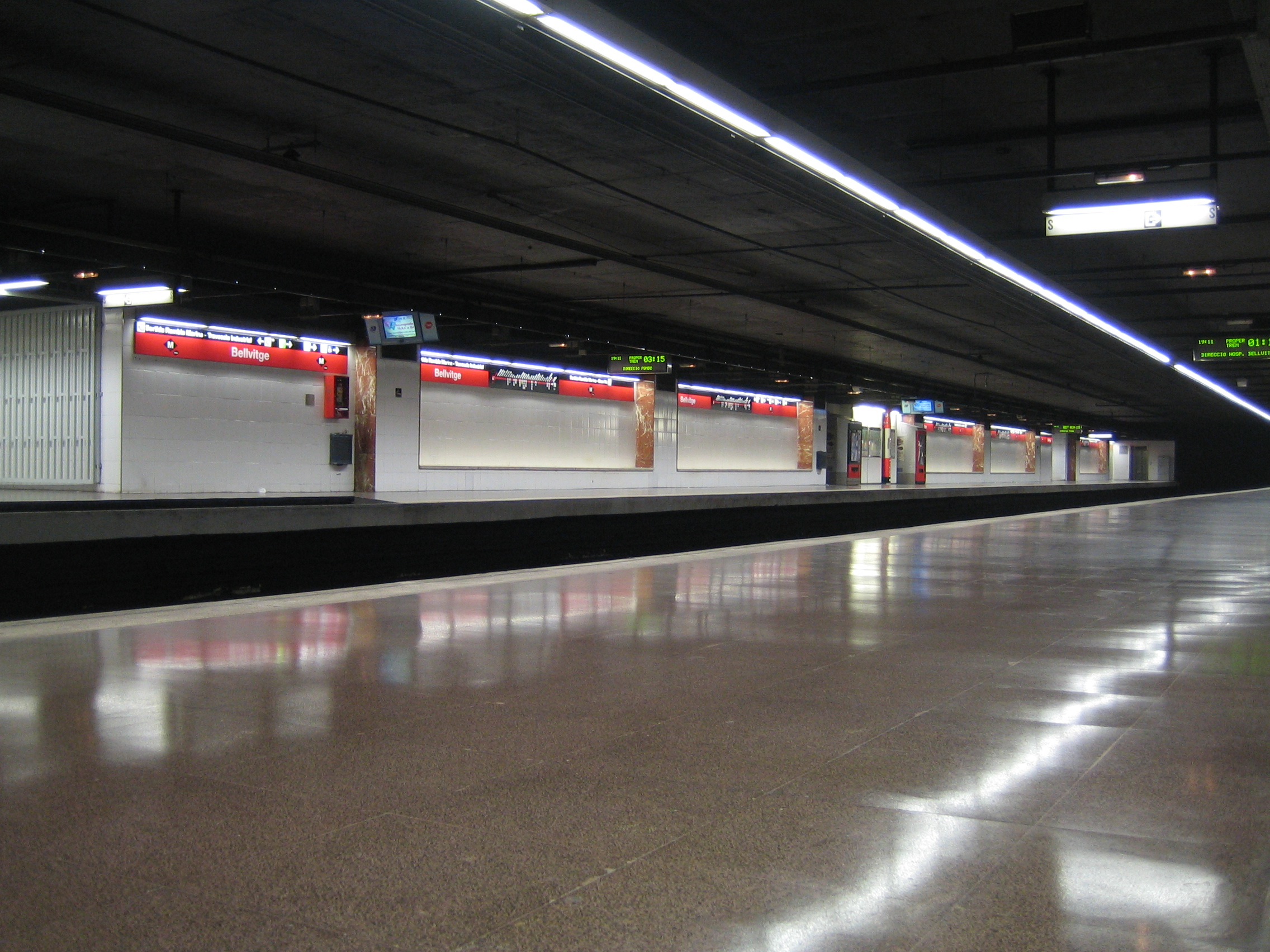
- The station platforms

General information
- Location: L'Hospitalet de Llobregat
- Coordinates: 41°21′5″N 2°6′43″E
- System: Barcelona Metro rapid transit station
- Owner: Transports Metropolitans de Barcelona
- Tracks: 2

Construction
- Structure type: Underground
- Accessible: yes

Other information
- Fare zone: 1 (ATM)

History
- Opened: 1989; 37 years ago

Services
Preceding station	Metro	Following station
Hospital de Bellvitge Terminus	L1	Avinguda Carrilet towards Fondo
Location
- Location within Barcelona Location within Spain

Bellvitge–Rambla Marina (Catalan pronunciation: [ˌbeʎˈβidʒə]) is a Barcelona Metro station, in the L'Hospitalet de Llobregat municipality of the Barcelona metropolitan area, and named after the nearby neighbourhood of Bellvitge. The station is served by line L1. It is some 750 metres (2,460 ft) west of Bellvitge railway station, served by Rodalies de Catalunya commuter and regional rail services.

Bellvitge–Rambla Marina metro station is located under Rambla de la Marina and can be accessed from both sides of the road. The station entrances access two underground ticket halls, which in turn give access to two 96-metre (315 ft) long side platforms on a lower level.

The station opened in 1989, when line L1 was extended from Avinguda Carrilet station to Hospital de Bellvitge station.

The station hosts an electric vehicle charging station which is powered by the trains' regenerative braking.

== See also ==
- List of Barcelona Metro stations
- Transport in L'Hospitalet de Llobregat
