= Entença station =

Metro station in Barcelona, Spain

Coordinates: 41.384°N 2.145°E

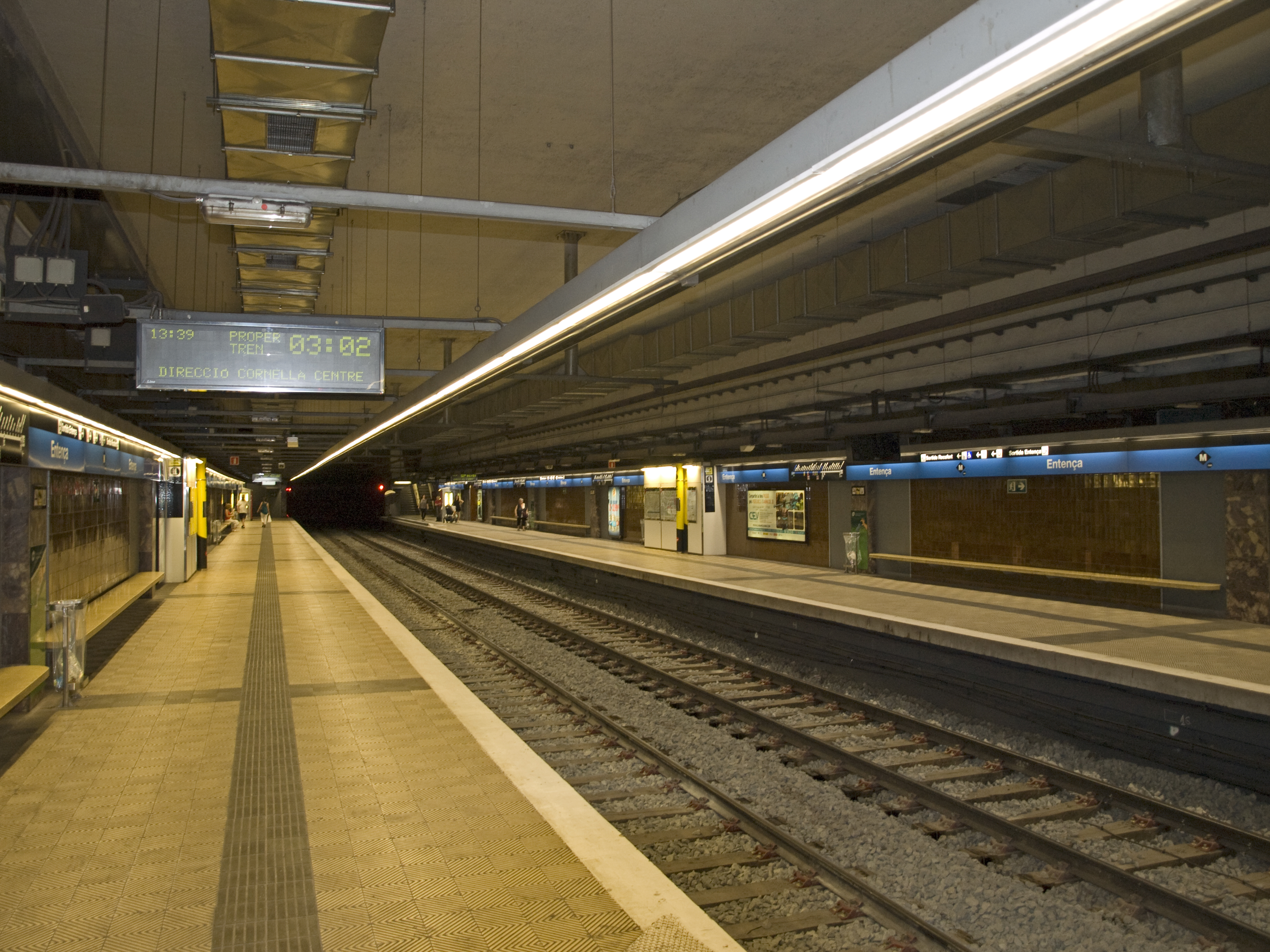
The platforms

Entença (Catalan pronunciation: [ənˈtɛnsə]) is a station on line 5 of the Barcelona Metro. The station is located underneath Carrer Rosselló in the Eixample, between Carrer Entença and Carrer Rocafort. It was opened in 1969.

The side-platform station has a ticket hall on either end, the eastern one with one access at Carrer Rocafort, and the western one with one access at Entença.

== Services ==
| Preceding station | Metro | Following station |
|---|---|---|
| Sants Estació towards Cornellà Centre | L5 | Hospital Clínic towards Vall d'Hebron |
