= Barcelona Metro line 1 =

Rapid transit line in Barcelona, Spain

Coordinates: 41.387°N 2.170°E

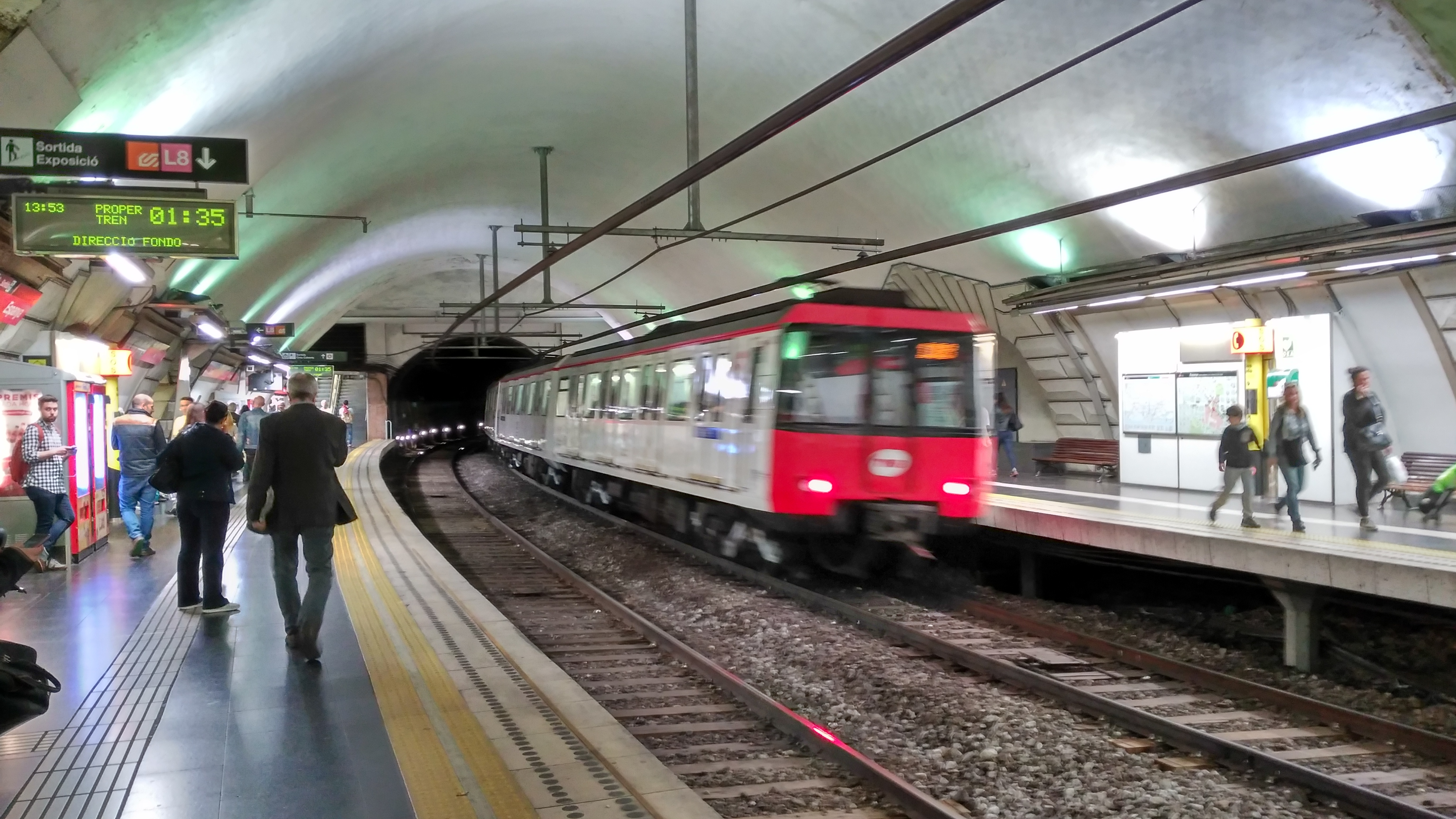
- A 4000 series train leaving Espanya

Overview
- Service type: Conventional metro
- System: Barcelona Metro
- Status: Operational
- Locale: L'Hospitalet de Llobregat and Barcelona, Spain
- First service: June 10, 1926; 100 years ago
- Current operator: TMB

Route
- Termini: Hospital de Bellvitge; Fondo
- Stops: 30
- Distance travelled: 20.7 km (12.9 mi)
- Average journey time: 35 minutes

Technical
- Rolling stock: 6000 and 8000 series
- Track gauge: 1674 mm
- Electrification: 1,500 V DC rigid overhead wire
- Operating speed: 26.8 km/h (16.7 mph)
- Track owner: TMB

Line 1 (Catalan pronunciation: [ˈlini.ə ˈu]), often shortened to L1, coloured red and often simply called Línia vermella ([ˈlini.ə bərˈmɛʎə]; "Red Line"), is the second oldest Barcelona Metro line, after Line 3. It is the longest line of the Barcelona Metro and links L'Hospitalet de Llobregat and Santa Coloma de Gramenet, crossing and serving the centre of Barcelona. Originally operated by the independent Ferrocarril Metropolitano Transversal de Barcelona, it is today operated by Transports Metropolitans de Barcelona (TMB) and is part of the ATM fare-integrated main transport system. L1 is the only metro line in Spain to use old Iberian gauge tracks (1674 mm), slightly wider than those used by most Spanish main line railways.

The line was created in 1926 as a means to join the rail stations the city had in the 1920s, and in preparation for the 1929 Universal Exposition. It has been growing since then to become a large line made up of 30 stations, as of 2007, the network's busiest one. These stations are architecturally homogenous, and as in the case of most metro lines in Barcelona, ornamentation is virtually absent from them. Some of them are improving their artificial lighting. Most of the line is underground, except for one short section, and at one point it shares tunnels with mainline tracks.

Future plans are for the line to be extended southwards towards El Prat de Llobregat and from its northern terminus into Badalona, where it will join Line 2 at Badalona Centre.

== History ==
Evolution of Line 1, 1926–1992 (including future extensions)

- 1926 – Bordeta-Catalunya section opened.
- 1932 – Bordeta-Santa Eulàlia and Catalunya-Arc de Triomf sections opened.
- 1933 – Arc de Triomf-Marina section opened.
- 1951 – Marina-Clot section opened.
- 1952 – Clot-Navas section opened.
- 1954 – Navas-Fabra i Puig section opened.
- 1968 – Fabra i Puig-Torras i Bages section opened.
- 1983 – Torras i Bages-Santa Coloma and Santa Eulàlia-Torrassa sections opened. Bordeta station closed.
- 1987 – Torrassa-Avinguda Carrilet section opened.
- 1989 – Avinguda Carrilet-Feixa Llarga (now Hospital de Bellvitge) section opened.
- 1992 – Santa Coloma-Fondo section opened.

== Route ==
The line runs from Hospital de Bellvitge, in the municipality of L'Hospitalet de Llobregat, and Fondo, in Santa Coloma de Gramenet. Most of the line is underground, except for a short elevated section running parallel to Rodalies de Catalunya mainline trains between Plaça de Sants and Santa Eulàlia stations with an intermediate stop at Mercat Nou.

Between Catalunya and Arc de Triomf stations, L1 shares tunnels with an ADIF owned main line railway, carrying Renfe operated Rodalies de Catalunya suburban passenger services. With four tracks in the tunnels, the outer tracks carry L1 metro services whilst the middle two tracks carry main line services. At Catalunya station, the L1 metro trains stop at side platforms, whilst the Rodalies de Catalunya trains serve an island platform. At Arc de Triomf station, the Rodalies de Catalunya trains stop at side platforms, whilst the L1 trains serve platforms in flanking single track tunnels. At the intermediate Urquinaona station, the L1 metro trains stop at side platforms, whilst main line trains do not stop.

== Map ==
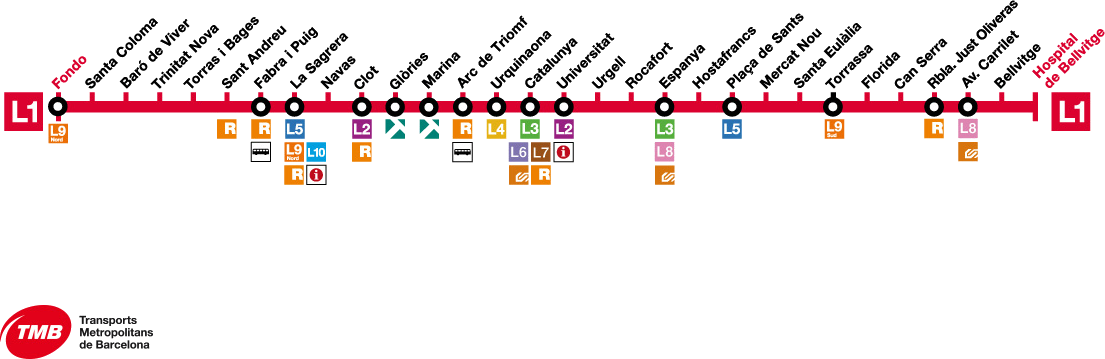

== Stations ==
Station	Image	Location	Opened	Interchanges
Hospital de Bellvitge		L'Hospitalet de Llobregat	19 October 1989	
Bellvitge		L'Hospitalet de Llobregat	19 October 1989	
Avinguda Carrilet		L'Hospitalet de Llobregat	24 April 1987	Ferrocarrils de la Generalitat de Catalunya Barcelona Metro line 8 Llobregat–Anoia Line
Rambla Just Oliveras		L'Hospitalet de Llobregat	24 April 1987	Rodalies de Catalunya R1–RG1 (Rodalies de Catalunya) R3 (Rodalies de Catalunya) R4 (Rodalies de Catalunya)
Can Serra		L'Hospitalet de Llobregat	24 April 1987	
Florida		L'Hospitalet de Llobregat	24 April 1987	
Torrassa		L'Hospitalet de Llobregat	23 December 1983	Barcelona Metro Barcelona Metro line 9 Barcelona Metro line 10
Santa Eulàlia		L'Hospitalet de Llobregat	23 December 1983	
Mercat Nou		Sants-Montjuïc, Barcelona	10 June 1926	
Plaça de Sants		Sants-Montjuïc, Barcelona	10 June 1926	Barcelona Metro Barcelona Metro line 5
Hostafrancs		Sants-Montjuïc, Barcelona	10 June 1926	
Espanya		Sants-Montjuïc, Barcelona	10 June 1926	Barcelona Metro Barcelona Metro line 3 Ferrocarrils de la Generalitat de Catalunya Barcelona Metro line 8 Llobregat–Anoia Line
Rocafort		Eixample, Barcelona	10 June 1926	
Urgell		Eixample, Barcelona	10 June 1926	
Universitat		Eixample, Barcelona	10 June 1926	Barcelona Metro Barcelona Metro line 2
Catalunya		Eixample, Barcelona	10 June 1926	Barcelona Metro Barcelona Metro line 3 Ferrocarrils de la Generalitat de Catalunya Barcelona–Vallès Line Rodalies de Catalunya R1–RG1 (Rodalies de Catalunya) R3 (Rodalies de Catalunya) R4 (Rodalies de Catalunya)
Urquinaona		Eixample, Barcelona	1 July 1932	Barcelona Metro Barcelona Metro line 4
Arc de Triomf		Eixample, Barcelona	1 July 1932	Rodalies de Catalunya R1–RG1 (Rodalies de Catalunya) R3 (Rodalies de Catalunya) R4 (Rodalies de Catalunya)
Marina		Sant Martí, Barcelona	1 April 1933	Trambesòs
Glòries		Sant Martí, Barcelona	23 June 1951	Trambesòs
Clot		Sant Martí, Barcelona	23 June 1951	Barcelona Metro Barcelona Metro line 2 Rodalies de Catalunya R1–RG1 (Rodalies de Catalunya) R2 (Rodalies de Catalunya)
Navas		Sant Andreu, Barcelona	8 May 1953	
La Sagrera		Sant Andreu, Barcelona	26 January 1954	Barcelona Metro Barcelona Metro line 5 Barcelona Metro line 9 Barcelona Metro line 10 Rodalies de Catalunya R3 (Rodalies de Catalunya) R4 (Rodalies de Catalunya)
Fabra i Puig		Sant Andreu, Barcelona	15 May 1954	Rodalies de Catalunya R3 (Rodalies de Catalunya) R4 (Rodalies de Catalunya) R7 (Rodalies de Catalunya)
Sant Andreu		Sant Andreu, Barcelona	14 March 1968	Rodalies de Catalunya R2 (Rodalies de Catalunya)
Torras i Bages		Sant Andreu, Barcelona	14 March 1968	
Trinitat Vella		Sant Andreu, Barcelona	21 December 1983	
Baró de Viver		Sant Andreu, Barcelona	21 December 1983	
Santa Coloma		Santa Coloma de Gramenet	21 December 1983	
Fondo		Santa Coloma de Gramenet	18 February 1992	Barcelona Metro Barcelona Metro line 9
