= Plaça de Catalunya station =

Barcelona Metro station

Plaça de Catalunya
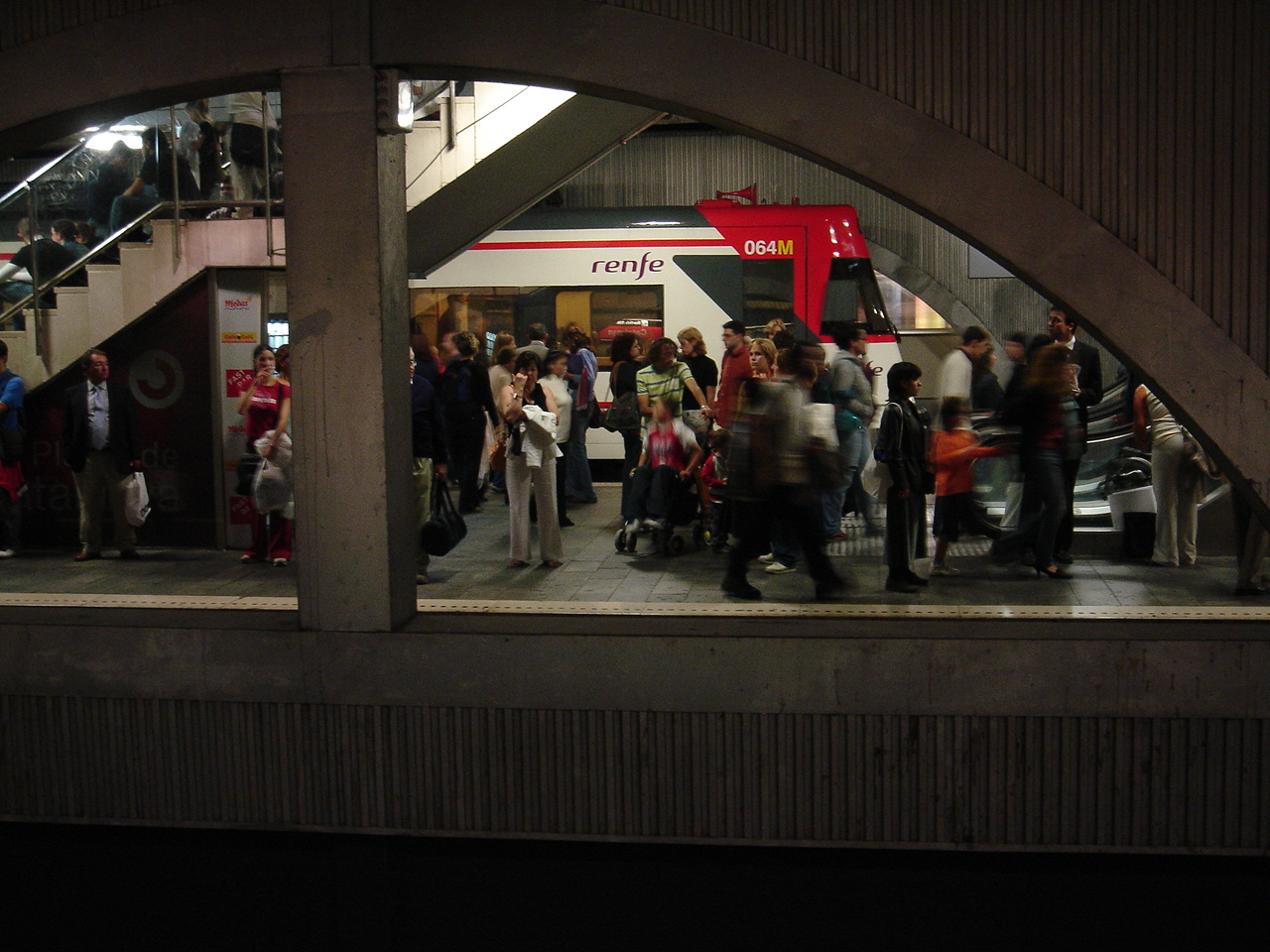
- Barcelona Metro line 1 and Rodalies de Catalunya station during rush hour

General information
- Location: Plaça de Catalunya, Barcelona; Spain
- Coordinates: 41°23′13″N 2°10′12″E
- Operator: Ferrocarrils de la Generalitat de Catalunya, Renfe and Transports Metropolitans de Barcelona
- Lines: Lleida–Manresa–Barcelona (PK 183.9); Barcelona–Vallès (PK 0.0)
- Platforms: 4 side platforms for Barcelona Metro, 4 bay and 1 side platform for FGC; 1 island platform for Rodalies

Construction
- Structure type: Underground
- Accessible: yes

Other information
- Fare zone: 1 (ATM)

History
- Opened: 30 December 1924; 101 years ago (Metro L3); 14 June 1926; 100 years ago (Metro L1); 1929; 97 years ago (FGC); 1 July 1932; 94 years ago (Rodalies)

Passengers
- 2024: 17,501,208
Services
Preceding station	Metro	Following station
Universitat towards Hospital de Bellvitge	L1	Urquinaona towards Fondo
Liceu towards Zona Universitària	L3	Passeig de Gràcia towards Trinitat Nova
Preceding station	FGC	Following station
Terminus	L6	Provença towards Sarrià
Terminus	L7	Provença towards Av. Tibidabo
Terminus	S1	Provença towards Terrassa Nacions Unides
Terminus	S2	Provença towards Sabadell Parc del Nord
Terminus	S5	Provença towards Sant Cugat
Terminus	S6	Provença towards Autonomous University
Terminus	S7	Provença towards Rubí
Preceding station	Rodalies de Catalunya	Following station
Barcelona Sants towards Molins de Rei	R1	Barcelona Arc de Triomf towards Maçanet-Massanes
Barcelona Sants towards L'Hospitalet de Llobregat	R3	Barcelona Arc de Triomf towards Latour-de-Carol-Enveitg
Barcelona Sants towards Sant Vicenç de Calders	R4	Barcelona Arc de Triomf towards Manresa
Barcelona Sants towards L'Hospitalet de Llobregat	RG1	Barcelona Arc de Triomf towards Portbou
Barcelona Sants towards L'Hospitalet de Llobregat	R12	Barcelona Arc de Triomf towards Lleida Pirineus
Location
- Location within Barcelona

Plaça de Catalunya station (Catalan pronunciation: [kətəˈluɲə]), also known as Barcelona-Plaça Catalunya, Plaça Catalunya or simply Catalunya is a major station complex in Barcelona located under Plaça de Catalunya, the city's central square and a large transport hub. Many Rodalies de Catalunya, Barcelona Metro and Ferrocarrils de la Generalitat de Catalunya lines go through it and many bus routes link it with all of the districts of the city and most of the municipalities in its metropolitan area.

It is one of the oldest railway stations in Catalonia and one of the first stations of Barcelona Metro network. It is also one of the busiest stations in Barcelona, being the most used metro station in 2024, and the terminal station in the city of all Metro del Vallès lines. It is served by Rodalies de Catalunya suburban lines R1, R3, R4 and regional line R12, TMB-operated Barcelona Metro lines L1 and L3, FGC-operated Barcelona Metro lines L6 and L7, and Metro del Vallès lines S1, S2, S5 and S55.

== History ==
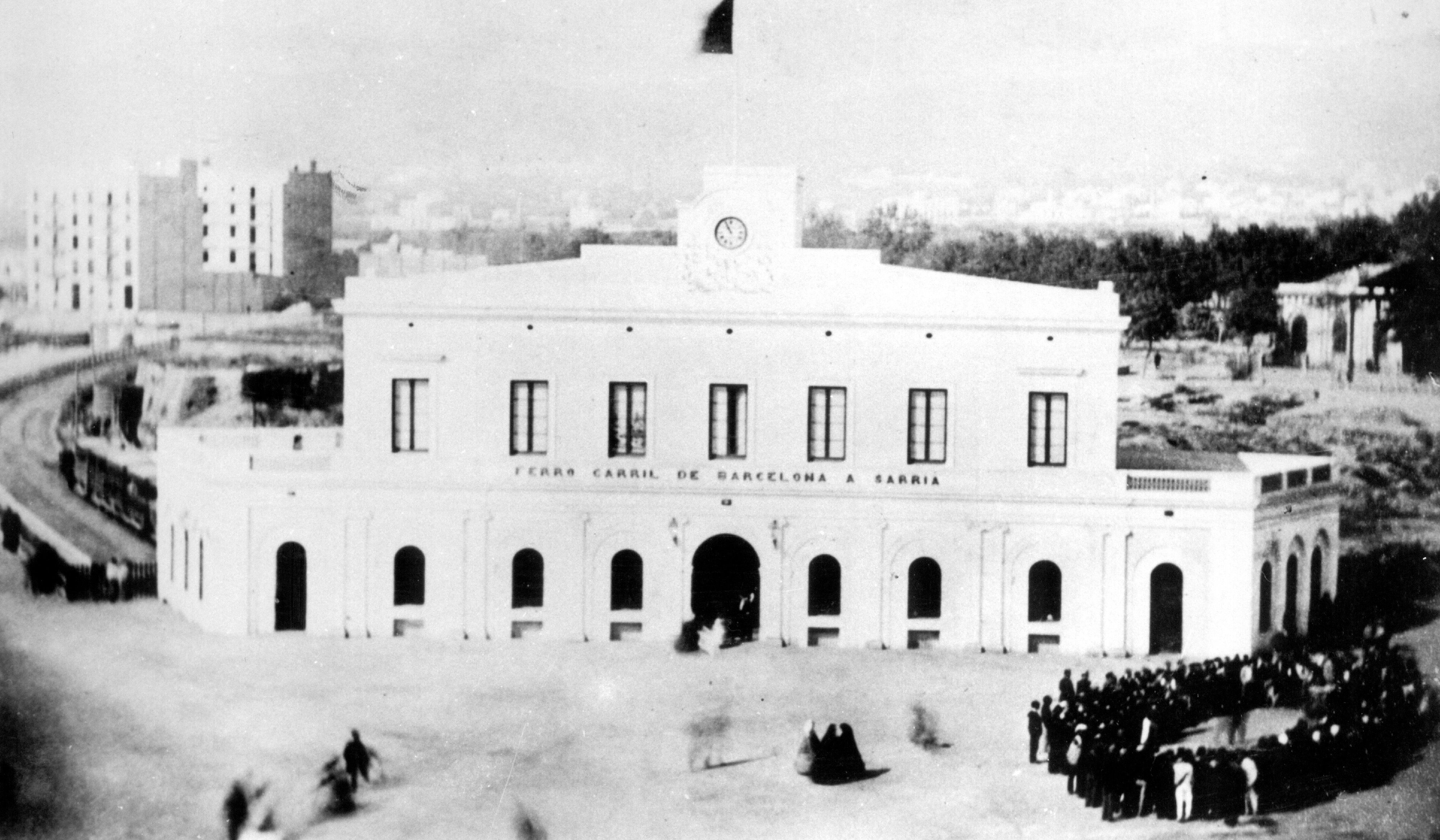
The former Ferrocarril de Sarrià terminus station built on the square in 1865.

A diagram of the rail complex showing the stations of the different operators: FGC subway Lines: L6, L7 FGC Suburban rail: S1, S2, S5, S55 RENFE Rail: R1, R3, R4, R7 TMB subway Lines: L1, L3

=== Ferrocarril de Sarrià ===
The current location of Plaça de Catalunya was the place chosen to build in 1863 the Ferrocarril de Sarrià terminus station. At that time, the current square didn't exist and the city rampart had recently been destroyed. Ferrocarril de Sarrià a Barcelona, popularly known as the Tren de Sarrià, built a line from this station to the Gràcia, Sant Gervasi and Sarrià neighbourhoods, which at the same were separate municipalities. Between 1924 and 1929 a temporary terminus station on Carrer de Balmes was built, between Ronda Universitat and Gran Via, while the underground station was being constructed. In 1929 the new underground Ferrocarril de Sarrià terminus station was opened, located under Carrer de Pelai and Carrer de Bergara. Originally, the station had two tracks arranged in one underground hall with platforms 1 and 2. In 1959 a second hall was opened, with platforms 3 and 4, and some years later, a third hall with platforms 5 and 6.

=== The arrival of the Iberian gauge ===
In 1854, the Vilafranca line placed its terminus station near Canaletes and Portal de Isabel II, on the south part of Plaça de Catalunya. This line was built in Iberian broad gauge and connected Vilafranca del Penedès and other municipalities in Tarragona province with Barcelona city. Finally, this line placed its terminus station at Sants railway station. On 1 July 1932 a new underground station serving the Iberian gauge rail was opened as a terminus station on the Manresa and Puigcerdà lines. These lines had its terminus station at Estació del Nord and were managed by Ferrocarril del Norte, one of Renfe's predecessors. In 1977, with the opening of the rail link between this station and Sants, the station ceased to be a terminus station and the Manresa and Puigcerdà lines terminated instead in Sants. The facilities were completely rejuvenated in 1983 as the station had heavily deteriorated.

=== Gran Metropolitano de Barcelona ===
Barcelona Metro line 3 station was opened on 30 December 1924 with the opening of the line between this station and Lesseps. This part of the line was the first metropolitan railway and the starting of Barcelona Metro network, which was managed by Gran Metro and was called Gran Metropolitano de Barcelona. Initially, the station was not linked to the Transversal station when this one was opened. After the municipalization of the company during the 1960s, the platforms were extended to hold a fifth car and a corridor to link both metro lines was built. During the 1980s the former corridor that linked the station with Rodalies was closed, but today is still preserved although it is not used. In 2007 the access from Rivadeneyra street was closed because a transformer was installed in to provide more electrical power to the line. Some years before, one of the accesses located on the south part of the square was closed due to vandalism.

=== Ferrocarril Metropolitano Transversal ===
Barcelona Metro line 1 station is one of the first metro stations in the city of Barcelona and it was part of Ferrocarril Metropolitano Transversal. Although this station was opened on 14 June 1926 its current location was opened in 1933. At first it was a terminus metro station and it was located under Ronda de la Universitat, between Rambla de Catalunya and Balmes street, and it had two tracks and three platforms. From 1 July 1932, it shares the station with Ferrocarril del Norte and the platform composition changed to one center platform for the Iberian gauge rail and two side platforms for the metro situated at each side of the Iberian gauge tracks. With the RENFE station reforms in 1983, Barcelona Metro line 1 station was reformed too.

== Station layout ==
G Ground	-	Exits
C Concourse	Concourse	Customer Service, Tickets
Level 1A
Level 1A	Side platform, doors will open on the right
Level 1A	Westbound	← to Hospital de Bellvitge (Universitat)
Level 1A	Platform 2	← to Molins/L'Hospitalet/St. V. de C.
Level 1A	Island platform, doors will open on the left
Level 1A	Platform 1	to Maç.-Mas./Puigcerdà/Manresa →
Level 1A	Eastbound	to Fondo (Urquinaona) →
Level 1A	Side platform, doors will open on the right
Level; 1B	Side platform, doors will open on the right
Level; 1B	Westbound	← to Zona Universitaria (Liceu)
Level; 1B	Eastbound	to Trinitat Nova (Passeig de Gràcia) →
Level; 1B	Side platform, doors will open on the right
Level; 2A	Side platform, doors will open on the right/left
Level; 2A	Platform 1	to Sarrià/St. Cugat/UAB →
Level; 2A	Island platform, doors will open on the right/left
Level; 2A	Platform 2	to Av. Tibidabo →
Level; 2A	Side platform, doors will open on the right/left
Level; 2B
Level; 2B	Side platform, doors will open on the left
Level; 2B	Platform 3	to Sabadell Plaça Major →
Level; 2B	Island platform, doors will open on the right/left
Level; 2B	Platform 4	to Terrassa Nacions Unides →
Level; 2B	Side platform, doors will open on the right

== Gallery ==
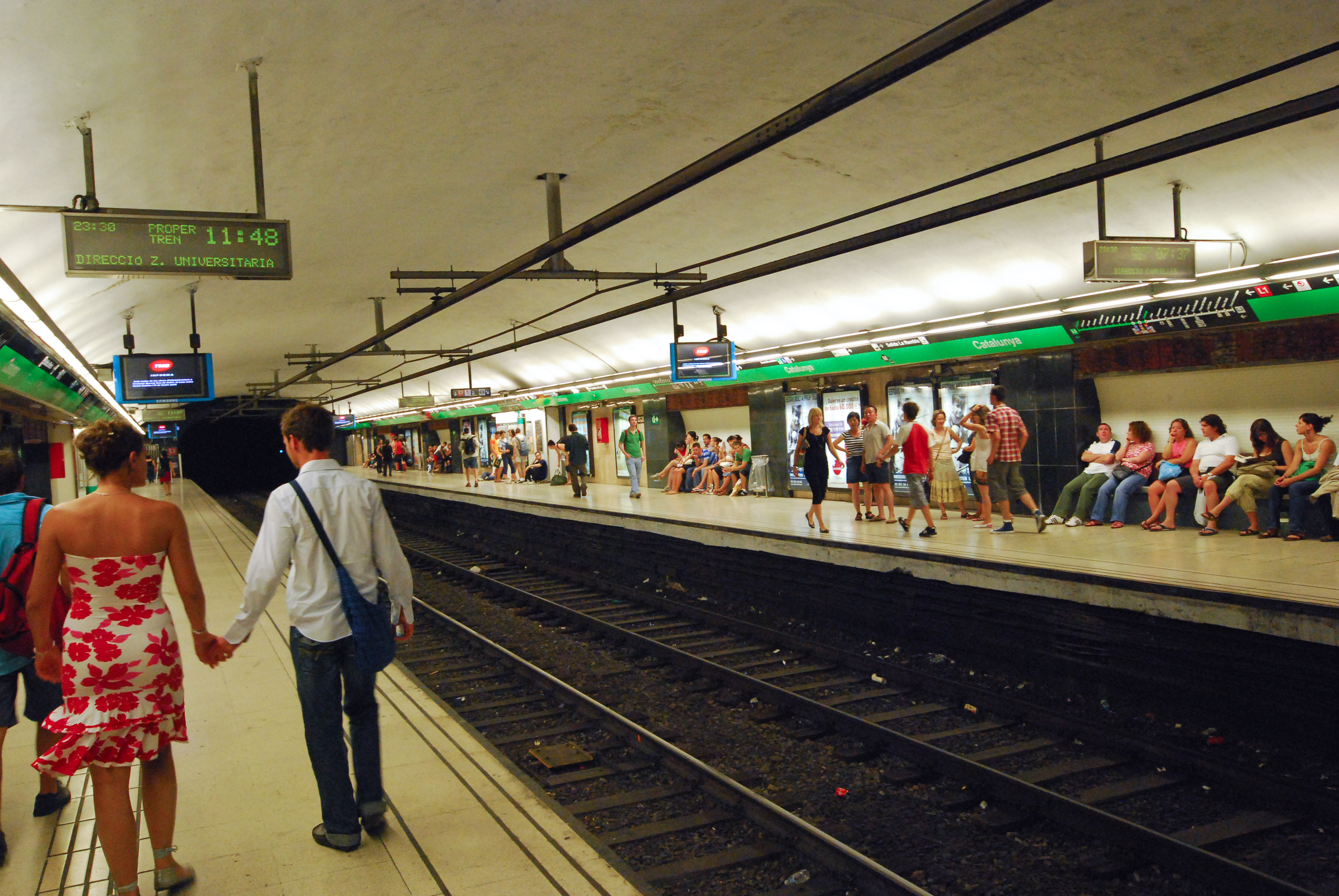
L3 metro station

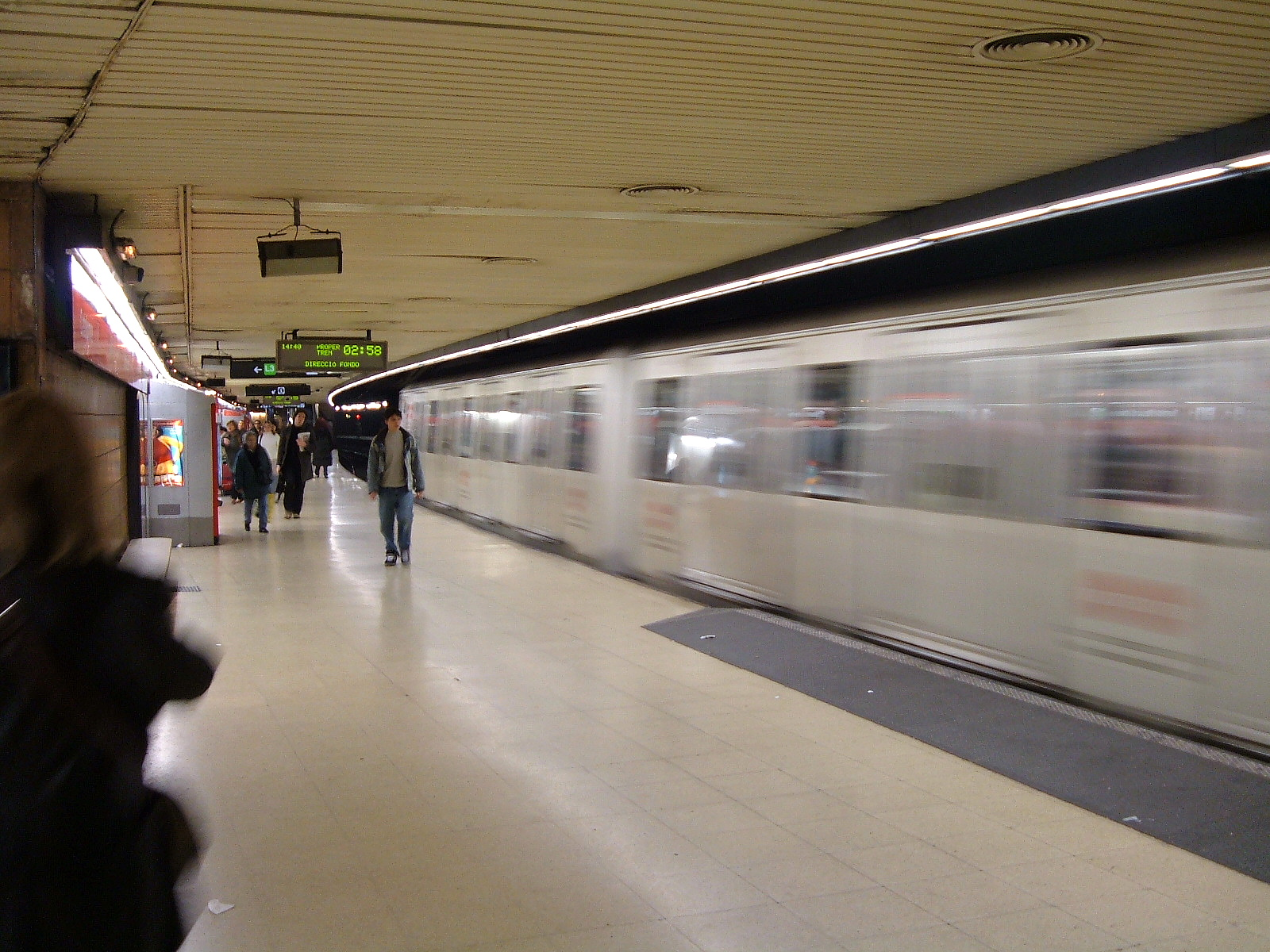
L1 metro station

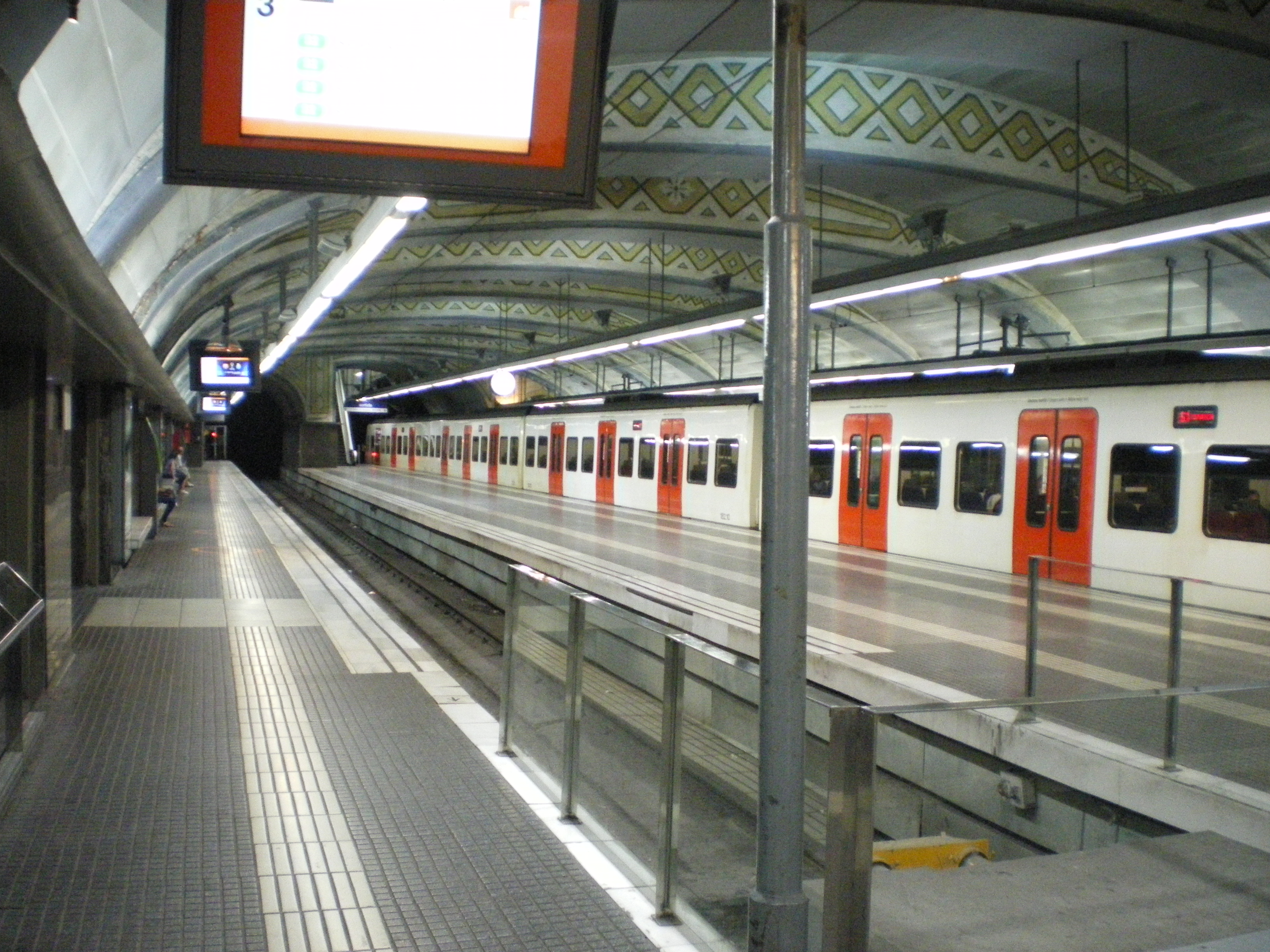
Another view of the FGC platforms

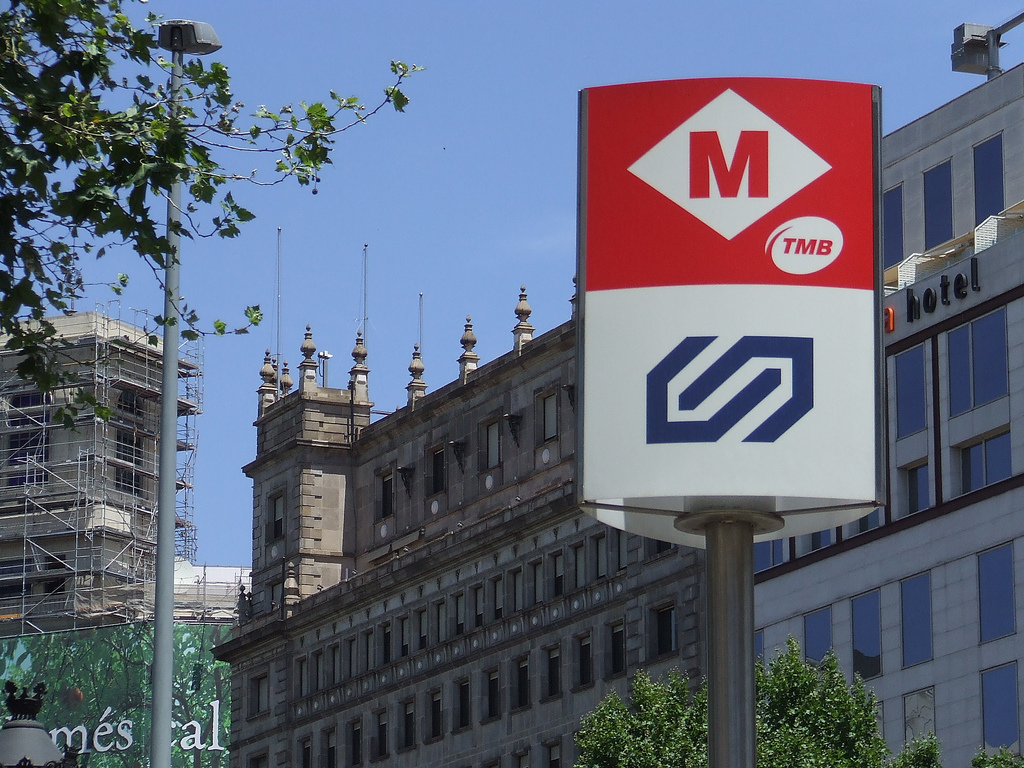
A Barcelona Metro and FGC signal on Plaça de Catalunya

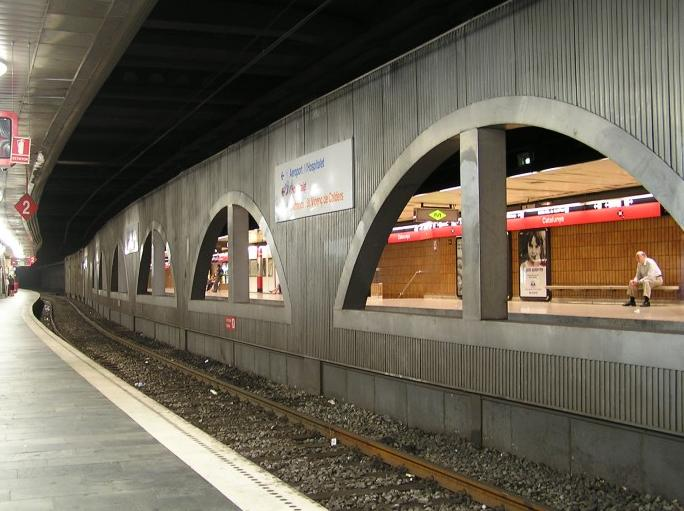
Track toward Sants railway station into Rodalies station

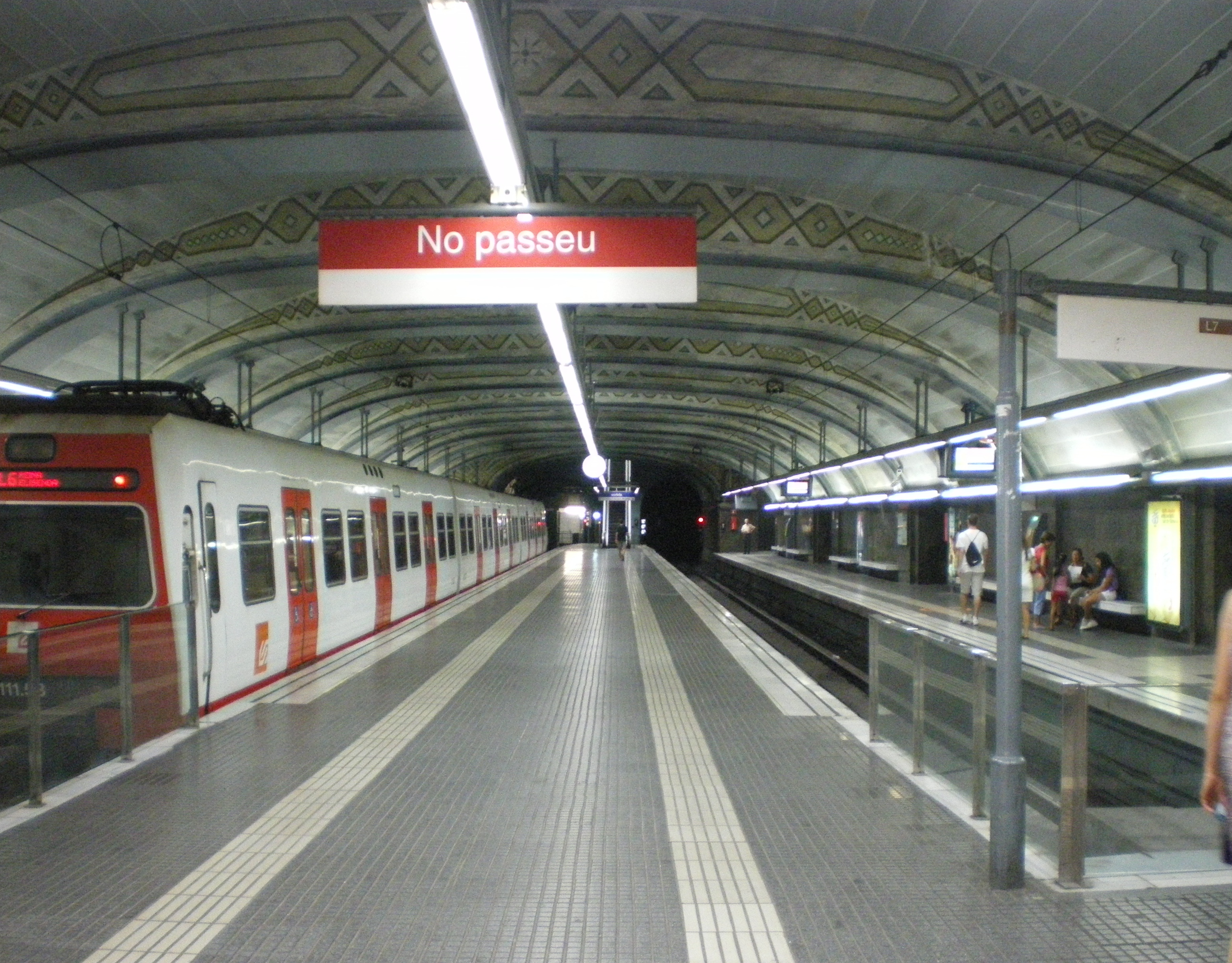
View of one of the Ferrocarrils de la Generalitat de Catalunya platforms
