= Sants-Montjuïc =

Coordinates: 41°21′47.82″N 2°09′45.32″E

- District of Barcelona
- Districts of Barcelona, Sants-Montjuïc coloured red
- Interactive map of Sants-Montjuïc
- Country: Spain
- Autonomous Community: Catalonia
- Province: Barcelona
- Comarca: Barcelonès
- Municipality: Barcelona

Sants-Montjuïc (Catalan pronunciation: [ˈsanz ˌmoɲ.ʒuˈik]) is one of the ten districts into which Barcelona has been split since 1984, numbered District 3. Comprising very different areas of the city, it covers the southern part of Barcelona, joining the two former districts II (made up by Montjuïc and Poble-Sec) and VII (Sants ― Hostafrancs ― La Bordeta), as well as the different areas comprised in the Zona Franca. As of the 2005, census it had a population of 177,636. It borders Les Corts, Eixample, Ciutat Vella, and the municipalities L'Hospitalet de Llobregat and El Prat de Llobregat.

It was one of the former municipalities added to Barcelona. The former municipality had the main nucleus in the neighbourhood of Sants but other current neighbourhoods of the district belonged to that municipality.

Within the limits of the neighborhood is Calle de la Creu Coberta, famous for its many shops. The Emperador Carles institute and the Joan Pelegrí school are located there, as well as the Montserrat Institution.

== Neighbourhoods ==
- La Bordeta
- La Font de la Guatlla
- Hostafrancs
- La Marina de Port
- La Marina del Prat Vermell
- El Poble-sec
- Sants
- Sants-Badal
- Montjuïc*
- Zona Franca - Port*

(*) Not properly a neighbourhood, since they have no inhabitants, but they are part of the district not included in other neighbourhoods.

== See also ==
- Districts of Barcelona
- Barcelona Sants railway station
- Avinguda de Josep Tarradellas, Barcelona
- Street names in Barcelona
- Urban planning of Barcelona
