= Hospital de Bellvitge station =

Metro station in Barcelona, Spain

Hospital de Bellvitge
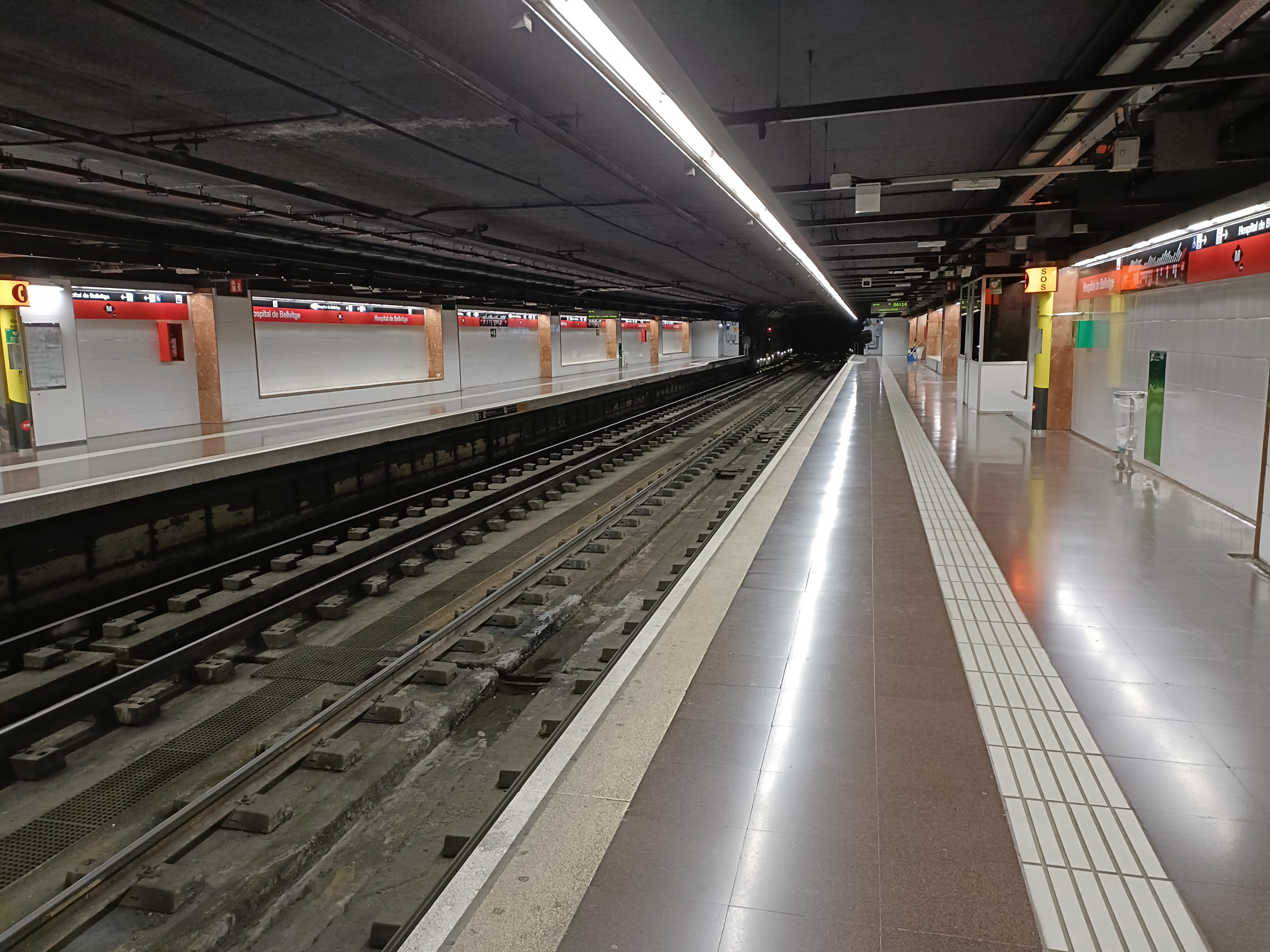

General information
- Location: L'Hospitalet de Llobregat
- Coordinates: 41°20′36″N 2°6′19″E
- System: Barcelona Metro rapid transit station
- Owner: Transports Metropolitans de Barcelona
- Tracks: 2

Construction
- Structure type: Underground
- Accessible: yes

Other information
- Fare zone: 1 (ATM)

History
- Opened: 1989; 37 years ago

Services
Preceding station	Metro	Following station
Terminus	L1	Bellvitge towards Fondo

Projected
Preceding station	Metro	Following station
El Prat Estació Terminus	L1	Bellvitge towards Badalona Est
Location
- Location within Province of Barcelona Location within Spain

Hospital de Bellvitge (Catalan pronunciation: [uspiˈtal də ˌbeʎˈβidʒə]), formerly known as Feixa Llarga ([ˈfeʃə ˈʎarɣə]), is a Barcelona Metro station, in the L'Hospitalet de Llobregat municipality of the Barcelona metropolitan area, and named after the nearby Bellvitge University Hospital. The station is the western terminus of line L1.

The station lies under the car park of the hospital, between the hospital itself and the Gran Via de les Corts Catalanes. It has a single entrance and underground ticket hall, which gives access to two 96-metre (315 ft) long side platforms on a lower level. Beyond the platforms at the country end of the station are several storage and reversing sidings.

The station opened in 1989, when line L1 was extended from Avinguda Carrilet station. It was originally known as Feixa Llarga, after the Estadi La Feixa Llarga, the football stadium of local team CE L'Hospitalet. It was given its current name in 2003.

Future plans are for L1 to be extended from this station towards El Prat de Llobregat, where it will provide interchange with the planned joint section of lines L2 and L9 towards Barcelona Airport.

== See also ==
- List of Barcelona Metro stations
- Transport in L'Hospitalet de Llobregat
