= Transports Metropolitans de Barcelona =

Public transit company in Barcelona, Spain

- Company type: Public
- Industry: Transport
- Founded: 1924; 102 years ago Barcelona, Catalonia, Spain
- Headquarters: Barcelona, Catalonia, Spain
- Area served: Barcelona metropolitan area
- Key people: Gerardo Lertxundi Albéniz (CEO)
- Services: Public transport infrastructure operation and managing
- Revenue: ▲€711.164 million (2010)
- Net income: ▲€3.847 million (2010)
- Total assets: ▲€1.113 billion (2010)
- Owner: Àrea Metropolitana de Barcelona
- Number of employees: 8,037 (2010)
- Website: tmb.cat

The Barcelona Metropolitan Transport, or Transports Metropolitans de Barcelona (TMB) in Catalan, is the main public transit operator in Barcelona. A combination of two formerly-separate companies, Ferrocarril Metropolità de Barcelona, SA. and Transports de Barcelona, SA., it runs most of the metro and local bus lines in Barcelona and the metropolitan area.

The bus network serves Barcelona and the metropolitan area through 109 lines that cover a total distance of 920.62 kilometres. The Barcelona Metro network has 123 stations. It is formed by six lines and a funicular railway. In 2016, TMB carried 578.75 million passengers and had 7,744 employees.

There is also an authority in Barcelona that seeks to coordinate and integrate other public transport companies (such as TRAMMET, for the local trams) into the same network, Autoritat del Transport Metropolità.

== Logo history ==
TMB changed its logo in 2014 after introducing a stencil-style variant of Helvetica for their publicity.

First logo (1983–2002)

Second and current logo (since 2002, still in use officially)

Third logo (2014–15)

== See also ==
- Autoritat del Transport Metropolità
- Barcelona Metro
- List of Barcelona Metro stations
- Ferrocarrils de la Generalitat de Catalunya
- Rodalies de Catalunya
- TRAMMET
- Transport in Barcelona
