= Fondo station =

Metro station in Barcelona, Spain

Coordinates: 41°27′6″N 2°13′6″E

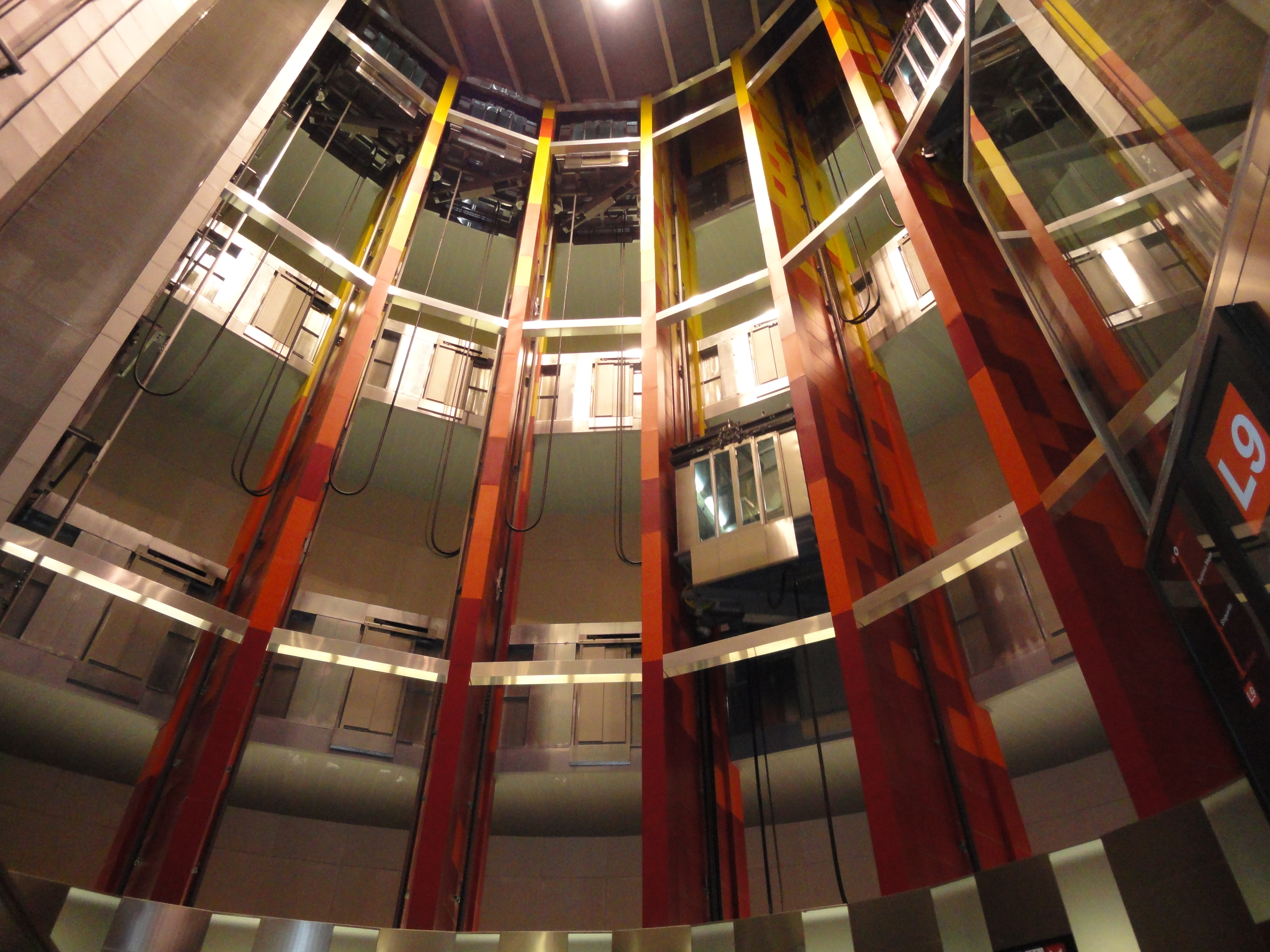
Lifts linking the lines L1 and L9, and the lobby

Fondo (Catalan pronunciation: [ˈfondu]) is a Barcelona Metro station in the municipality of Santa Coloma de Gramenet, in the northern part of the metropolitan area of Barcelona. It is served by two metro lines, L1 (red line), of which it is the northern terminus, and L9 (orange line). It was built in 1992 under Camí Fondo de Badalona, in the neighbourhood of Fondo (hence the name), between Carrer Dalmau and Carrer Verdi.

It began to serve L9 (orange line) on 13 December 2009, providing a transfer to the first part of Line 9 that was opened, which initially ran between Can Zam and Can Peixauet.

== Services ==
Preceding station	Metro	Following station
Santa Coloma towards Hospital de Bellvitge	L1	Terminus
Santa Rosa towards La Sagrera	L9 Nord	Església Major towards Can Zam
Projected
Santa Coloma towards El Prat Estació	L1	Montigalà - Lloreda towards Badalona Est
Santa Rosa towards Airport T1	L9	Església Major towards Can Zam

== See also ==
- List of Barcelona Metro stations
