= Aeroport T1 station =

Subway station at Barcelona Airport, Spain

Aeroport T1
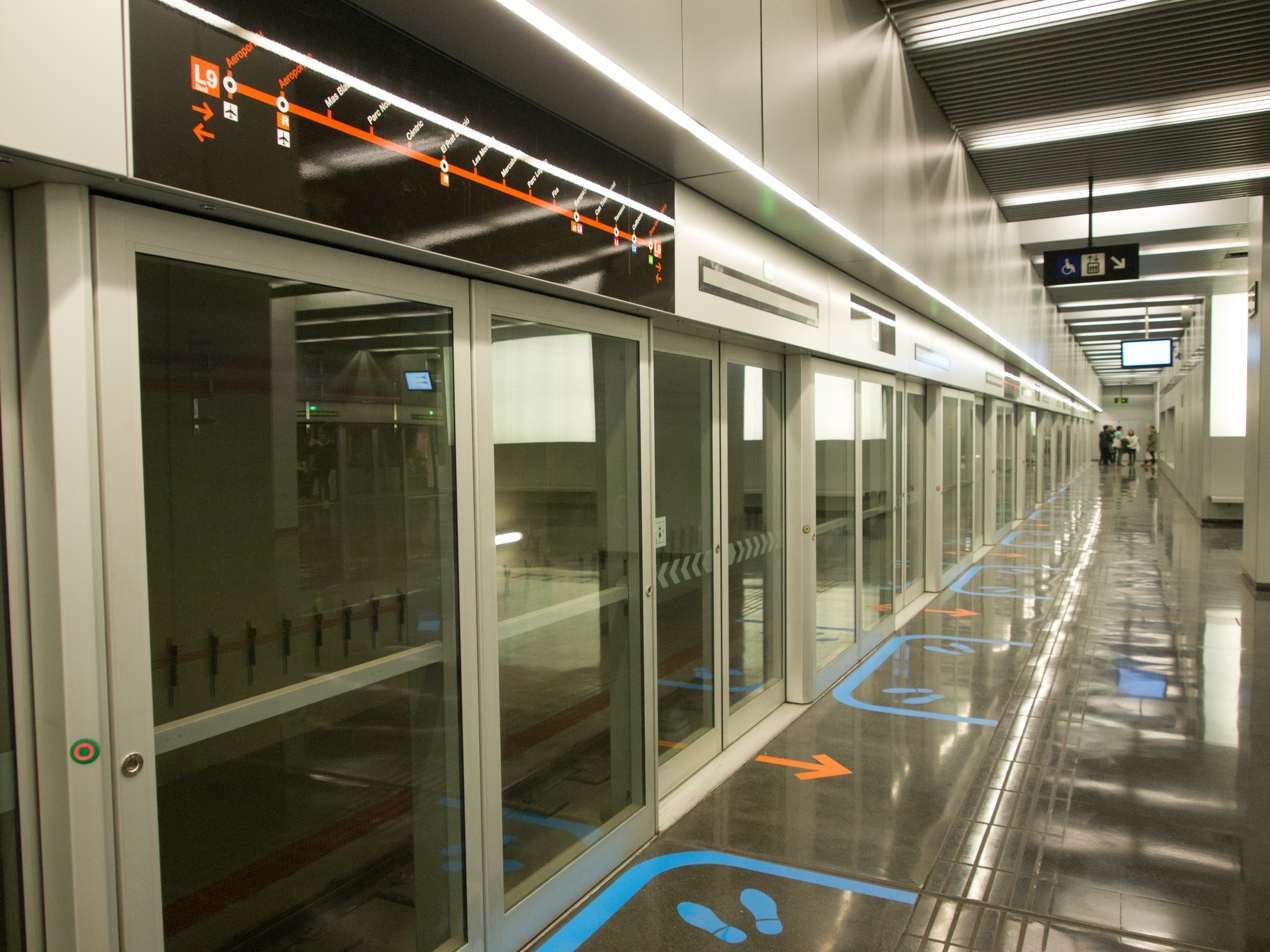
- Screen doors at the station's island platform.

General information
- Location: Barcelona–El Prat Airport; 08820 El Prat de Llobregat; Catalonia; Spain
- Coordinates: 41°17′22.7″N 2°04′26.0″E
- System: TMB rapid transit station
- Owner: Ifercat
- Operator: Transports Metropolitans de Barcelona (TMB)
- Line: Barcelona Metro line 9
- Platforms: 1 island platform
- Tracks: 2
- Connections: Barcelona–El Prat Airport; Local and interurban buses

Construction
- Structure type: Underground
- Parking: Several airport parking garages serving Barcelona–El Prat Airport's terminal T1 are located nearby.
- Accessible: The station is fully handicap-accessible.

Other information
- Station code: 901
- Fare zone: 1 (ATM Àrea de Barcelona)

History
- Opening: 12 February 2016

Services
Preceding station	Metro	Following station
Terminus	L9 Sud	Aeroport T2 towards Zona Universitària
Projected
Terminus	L2	Aeroport Terminal de Càrrega towards Badalona Pompeu Fabra
Terminus	L9	Aeroport Terminal de Càrrega towards Can Zam
Location

Aeroport T1 (Catalan pronunciation: [əˌeɾuˈpɔrt tərmiˈnal ˈu]) is a Barcelona Metro station that serves terminal T1 of Barcelona–El Prat Airport, in the municipality of El Prat de Llobregat, to the southwest of Barcelona. It is the southern terminus of the airport branch of Barcelona Metro line 9 (L9) and is operated by Transports Metropolitans de Barcelona (TMB).

Opened in 2016, the station is located underneath the airport terminal and consists of two levels. The trains run on the lower level, where there is a 16-metre (52 ft) island platform featuring screen doors. Adjacent to the station is a depot that can accommodate 12 trains. A new commuter rail link is projected to reach the station in the future.

== History ==
A tunnelling machine began excavating the tunnel for Barcelona Metro line 9 from Mas Blau to the Aeroport T1 station in March 2008 and finished in April 2009. The completion of the station's main structure was part of the construction of terminal T1, which opened in June 2009.

When the terminal opened, the airport branch of L9 was expected to be ready for passenger service in 2012. In March 2012, however, the Government of Catalonia announced that the opening date for the 20-kilometre (12 mi) section of the line between the airport terminals and Zona Universitària station would be postponed until 2014. In June 2014, the government announced that the section, apart from the Airport Terminal de Càrrega, La Ribera and Camp Nou stations, would open in the first half of 2016. The first day of passenger service was 12 February 2016.

== Train service ==
Service on the airport section of Barcelona Metro line 9 (L9), designated L9 Sud ("South"), operates driverless with a service frequency of 7 minutes in each direction between Aeroport T1 and Zona Universitària in western Barcelona. Additional partial services may be added if necessary, reducing the frequency to 4 minutes. Passengers using the metro stations located at the airport terminals are required to purchase a special ticket known as an airport ticket; basic single tickets issued by the operating company Transports Metropolitans de Barcelona (TMB) are not valid. The airport ticket also gives access to the rest of the TMB-operated Barcelona Metro system. Multiple-use tickets and unlimited passes issued by the Autoritat del Transport Metropolità (ATM)—a public agency in charge of coordinating public transportation operators in the Barcelona area—are valid, with the exception of the T-10 ten-trip ticket.

== Future ==
Commuter rail services to central Barcelona will also serve the station once a new airport rail link is built. Although a rail link has existed since 1975, it only reaches terminal T2, which is 1.8 kilometres (1.1 mi) from terminal T1. Construction work for the new link began in July 2015, originally with completion expected in 2018, with an opening date unknown. There is also a project to extend Barcelona Metro line 2 (L2) southwards using the route of the L9 between Parc Logístic and Aeroport T1 stations.
