= Església Major station =

Metro station in Barcelona, Spain

Coordinates: 41°27′16″N 2°12′44″E

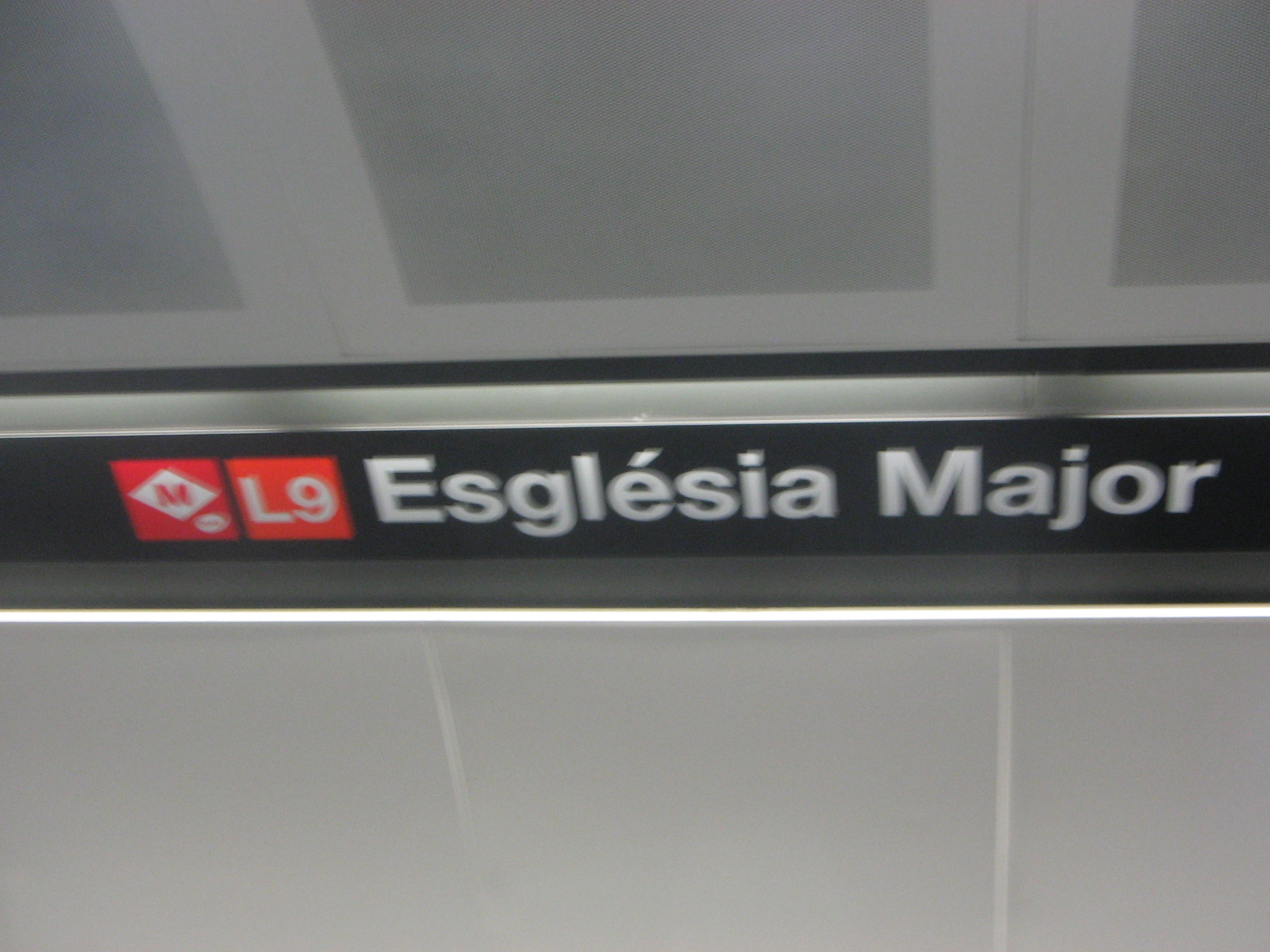

Església Major (Catalan pronunciation: [əzˈɣlezi.ə məˈʒo]) is a Barcelona Metro station in the municipality of Santa Coloma de Gramenet, in the northern part of the metropolitan area of Barcelona underneath Plaça dels Enamorats. The station is named after the town's main church, located in Plaça de l'Església. It is served by L9 and is one of the stations comprising the first part of Line 9 to be opened, between Can Zam and Can Peixauet, inaugurated on 13 December 2009. Sanchez-Piulachs, Arquitectes S.L were in charge of the design of Església Major.

In 2024, it was the 9th least used station in the Barcelona Metro network according to official TMB data, with 422,850 passengers.

== Services ==
Preceding station	Metro	Following station
Fondo towards La Sagrera	L9 Nord	Singuerlín towards Can Zam
Projected
Fondo towards Airport T1	L9	Singuerlín towards Can Zam

== See also ==
- List of Barcelona Metro stations
