= Santa Rosa station (Barcelona Metro) =

Metro station in Barcelona, Spain

Coordinates: 41°26′48″N 2°12′57″E

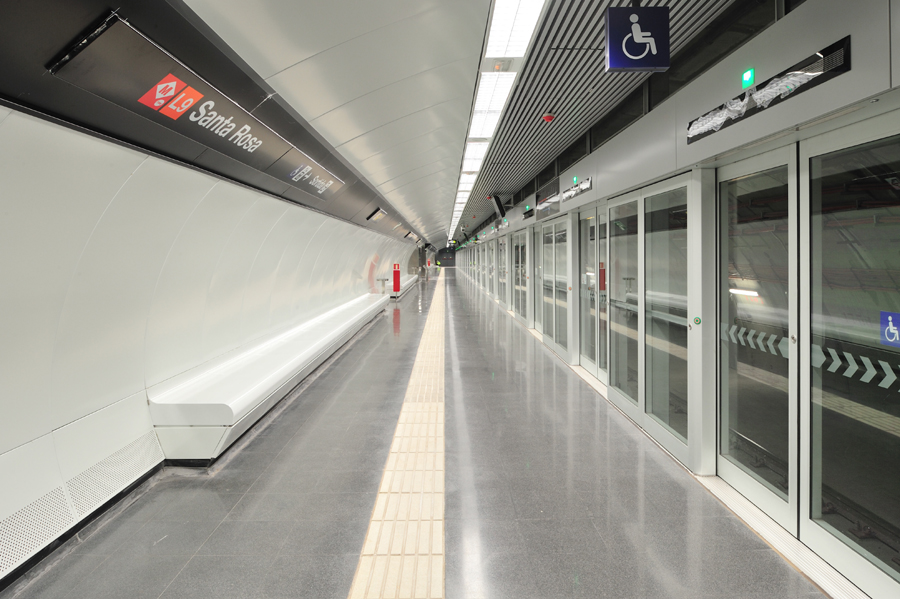
One of the platforms

Santa Rosa (Catalan pronunciation: [ˈsantə ˈrɔzə]) is a Barcelona Metro station in Santa Coloma de Gramenet, a suburb of Barcelona (Catalonia, Spain). It's served by L9 (orange line). The station opened in September 2011 in a previously built line section between Fondo and Can Peixauet. Its only entrance is in Avinguda dels Banús at the intersection with Carrer d'Irlanda. Its platforms are 108 metres long and located 44 m. under the street level. The area around the station underwent a refurbishment including a new square.

== Services ==
Preceding station	Metro	Following station
Can Peixauet towards La Sagrera	L9 Nord	Fondo towards Can Zam
Projected
Can Peixauet towards Airport T1	L9	Fondo towards Can Zam

== See also ==
- List of Barcelona Metro stations
