= Singuerlín station =

Metro station in Barcelona, Spain

Coordinates: 41°27′34″N 2°12′20″E

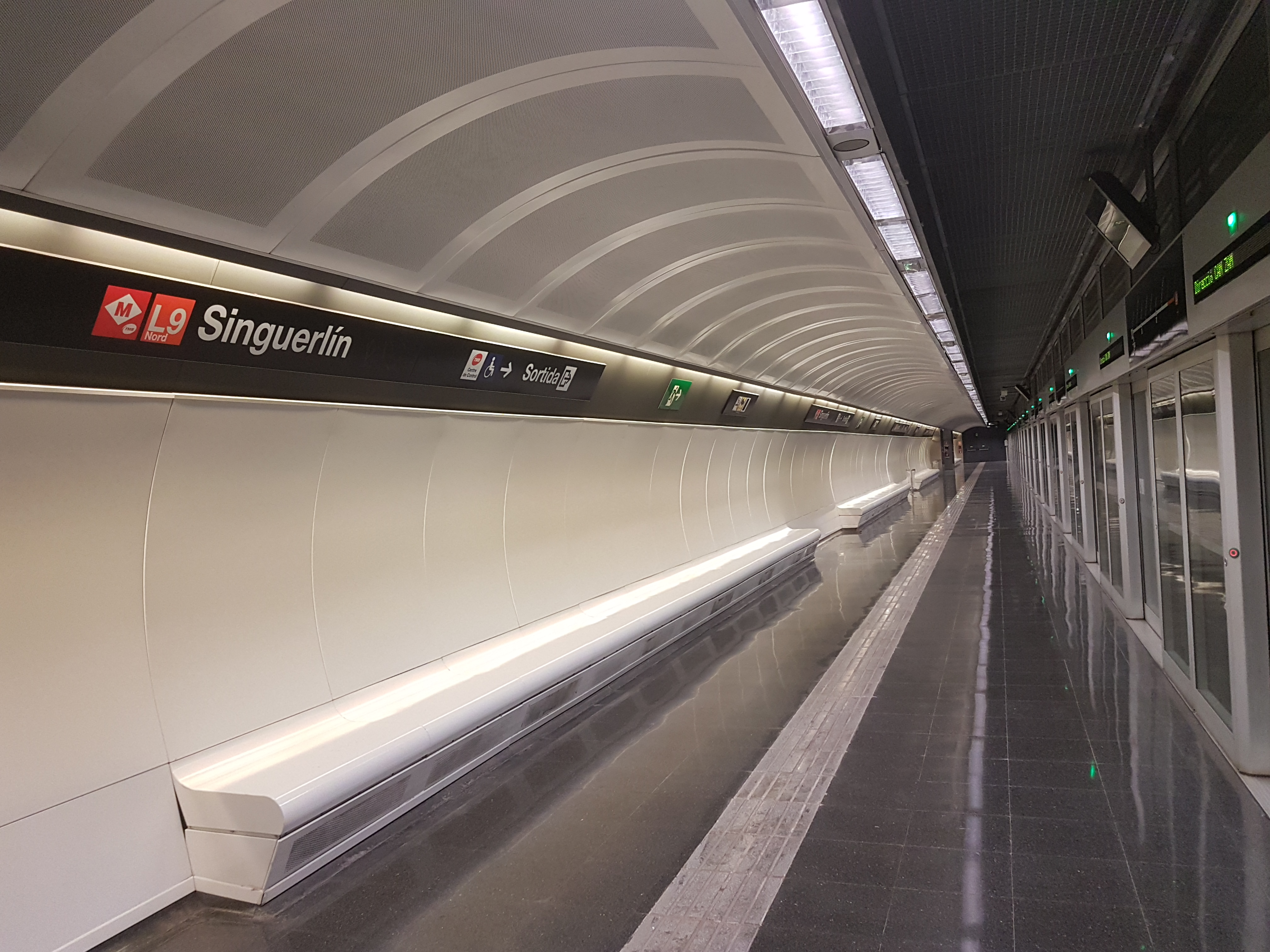
Singuerlín station platform

Singuerlín (Catalan pronunciation: [siŋɡərˈlin]) is a Barcelona Metro station in the municipality of Santa Coloma de Gramenet, in the neighbourhood of Singuerlín, located in the northern part of the metropolitan area of Barcelona. It's served by L9, the first part of Line 9 to be opened, between Can Zam and Can Peixauet.

== Services ==
Preceding station	Metro	Following station
Església Major towards La Sagrera	L9 Nord	Can Zam Terminus
Projected
Església Major towards Airport T1	L9	Can Zam Terminus

== See also ==
- List of Barcelona Metro stations
