= Singuerlín =

Singuerlín (Catalan pronunciation: [siŋɡərˈlin]) is a neighbourhood of Santa Coloma de Gramenet, in the metropolitan area of Barcelona (Barcelonès, Catalonia, Spain). It is located on a hill in a primarily residential part of the town, nowadays made up of semi-detached houses and tower blocks. However, as is the case with other areas in Santa Coloma, Singuerlín has its origins in slums built in the 1910s. Its original dwellers would first buy coupons in Barcelona shops which allowed them to acquire a small parcel of urban land, and then built their houses themselves. The area also has a football team of its own, C.F. Singuerlín, and a market hall which bears the same name and was opened in 1974.

== Transport ==
Since 2009 it has been served by Barcelona Metro station Singuerlín, on L9 (orange line).
