= Fira station =

Metro station in Barcelona, Spain

Fira
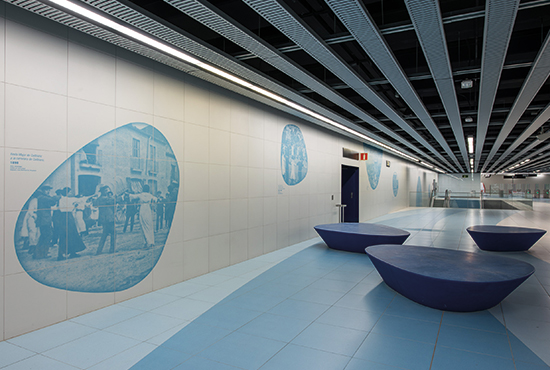
- Main station hall.

General information
- Location: Avinguda Joan Carles I 08908 L'Hospitalet de Llobregat; Catalonia; Spain
- Coordinates: 41°21′08″N 2°07′51″E
- System: TMB rapid transit station
- Owner: Ifercat
- Operator: Transports Metropolitans de Barcelona (TMB)
- Line: Barcelona Metro line 9
- Platforms: 2 side platforms
- Tracks: 2
- Connections: Local and interurban buses

Construction
- Structure type: Underground
- Accessible: The station is fully disabled-accessible.

Other information
- Fare zone: 1 (ATM Àrea de Barcelona)

History
- Opening: 12 February 2016

Services
Preceding station	Metro	Following station
Parc Logístic towards Airport T1	L9 Sud	Europa | Fira towards Zona Universitària
Projected
Parc Logístic towards Airport T1	L2	Foc towards Badalona Pompeu Fabra
Parc Logístic towards Airport T1	L9	Europa | Fira towards Can Zam
Location

Fira (Catalan pronunciation: [ˈfiɾə]), originally known as Fira 2 – Pedrosa, is a Barcelona Metro station serving Fira de Barcelona's Fira Gran Via major trade fair venue and the Pedrosa industrial park, in the L'Hospitalet de Llobregat municipality, to the south-west of Barcelona. It is situated underneath Avinguda Joan Carles I, at the intersection with Pedrosa and Botànica streets. It has a direct access to Fira Gran Via's main entrance. The station was designed by Japanese architect Toyo Ito.

The station opened for passenger service on 12 February 2016, when the 20-kilometre-long (12 mi), 15-station portion belonging to Barcelona Metro line 9 between Barcelona–El Prat Airport and Zona Universitària station in western Barcelona started operating. Designated L9 Sud ("L9 South"), the new Barcelona Metro line 9 section offers a regular service frequency of 7 minutes in each direction, though additional partial services may be added if necessary.
