= Bon Pastor station =

Metro station in Barcelona, Spain

Bon Pastor
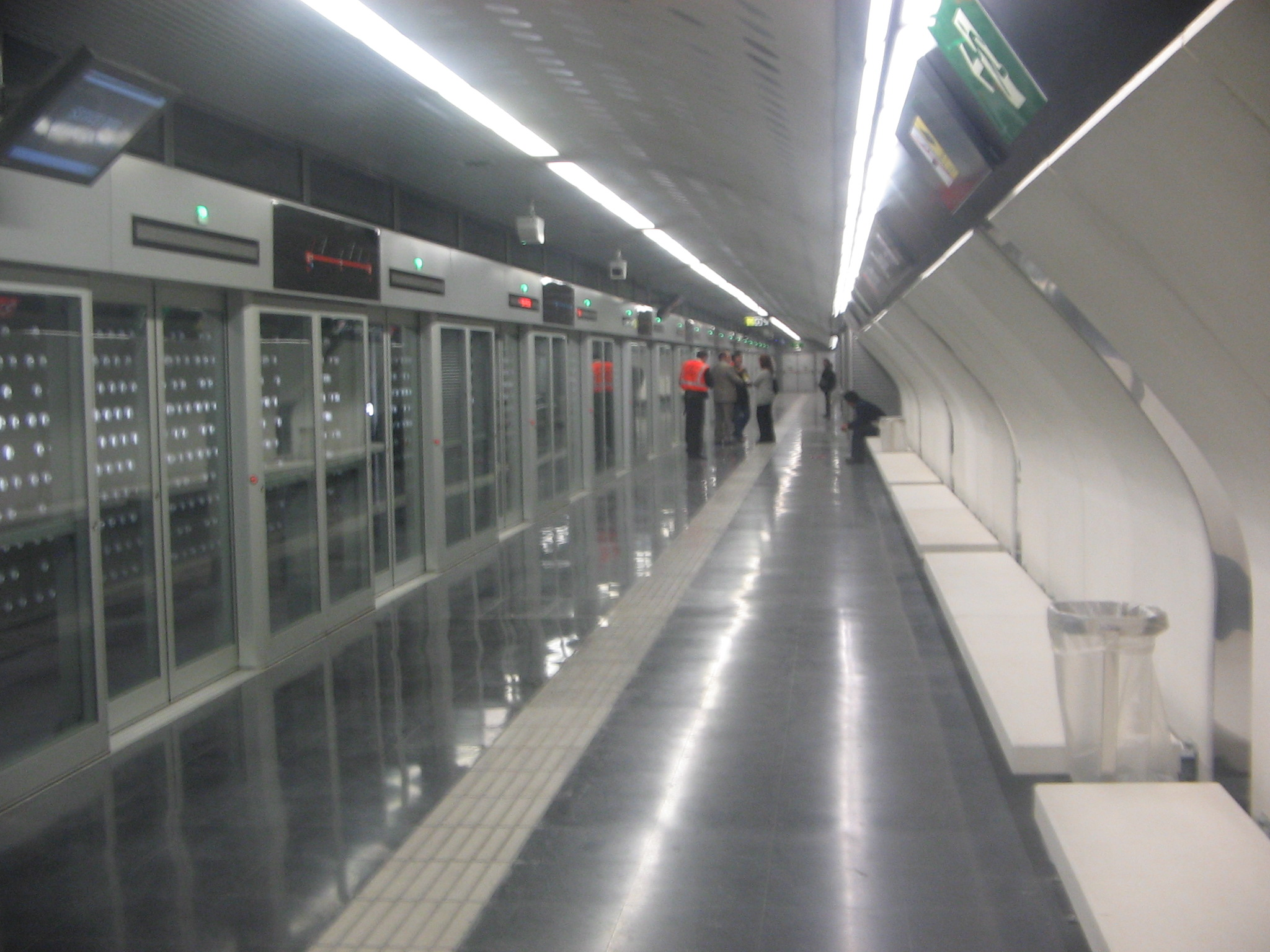

General information
- Location: Carrer de Sant Adrià, s/n 08030 Barcelona
- Coordinates: 41°26′10.04″N 2°12′19.11″E
- System: TMB rapid transit station
- Operator: Transports Metropolitans de Barcelona
- Platforms: 2 split platforms
- Tracks: 2
- Connections: Local and interurban buses

Construction
- Structure type: Underground
- Depth: 16 metres (52 ft)
- Platform levels: 3
- Accessible: yes

Other information
- Fare zone: 1 (Autoritat del Transport Metropolità)

History
- Opened: 18 April 2010

Services
Preceding station	Metro	Following station
Onze de Setembre towards La Sagrera	L9 Nord	Can Peixauet towards Can Zam
Onze de Setembre towards La Sagrera	L10 Nord	Llefià towards Gorg
Projected
Onze de Setembre towards Airport T1	L9	Can Peixauet towards Can Zam
Onze de Setembre towards Polígon Pratenc	L10	Llefià towards Gorg
Location

Bon Pastor (Catalan pronunciation: [ˈbɔm pəsˈto]) is a Barcelona Metro station named after the neighbourhood of the same name where the station is situated, part of Barcelona's district of Sant Andreu. This neighbourhood, one of Barcelona's most deprived areas and until very recently made up mostly of cheap public housing has been undergoing some renovation. The station was opened on 18 April 2010 with the opening of the line from this station to Gorg and Can Peixauet, enabling this neighbourhood to be connected with the metro network. It is served by TMB-operated Barcelona Metro lines L9 and L10.

== Layout ==
The station is located under Sant Adrià street and was built like many other new L9 metro stations with a 16-meter depth and 26 meter diameter well. The station is divided in three levels: the upper hall, the upper platform and the lower platform. The upper hall has an only access from the street equipped with escalators and elevators, making the station accessible for disabled persons. The upper hall has also ticket vending machines and a TMB Control Center. The upper platform is where run the trains towards La Sagrera and the lower platform is where run the trains towards Can Zam and Gorg stations. Until the opening of the line to La Sagrera, the lower platform was closed and all trains travelled on the upper level.

== Architecture ==
The walls of the tunnel where the platforms are located are cladded with cast stone panels with different densities, curves and perforations. The process combines white pre-cast stone with a gentle acid-etched finish and encrusted glass beads that let light filter through. Each platform is equipped with white cast stone benches with a shiny polished finish rest on cantilevered metal brackets to camouflage the station's air-conditioning outlets. This project was designed by architects A&M in conjunction with Escofet while the architectural design of the station in general was designed by Tomàs Morató.

== Gallery ==
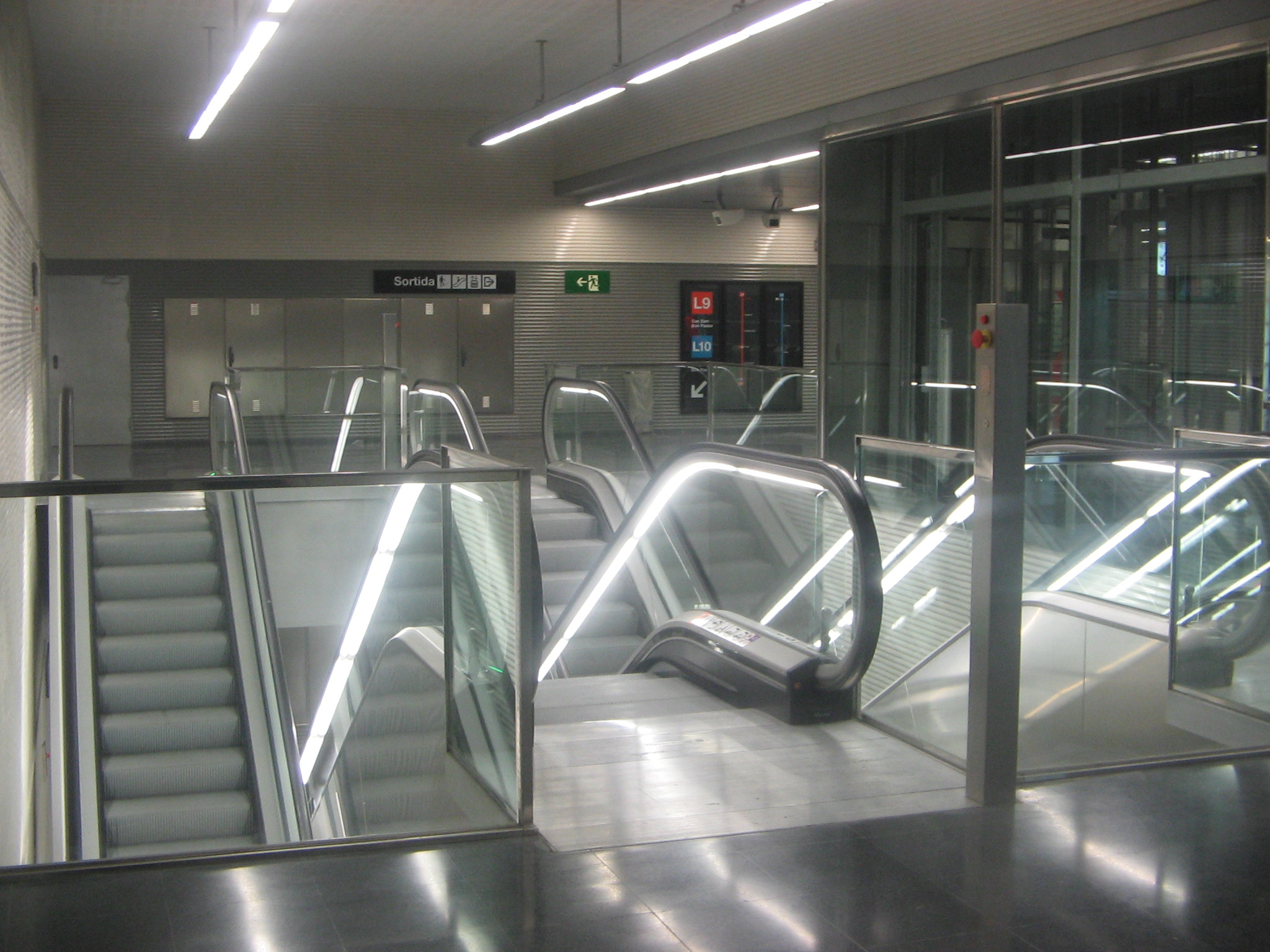
Escalators at the station hall

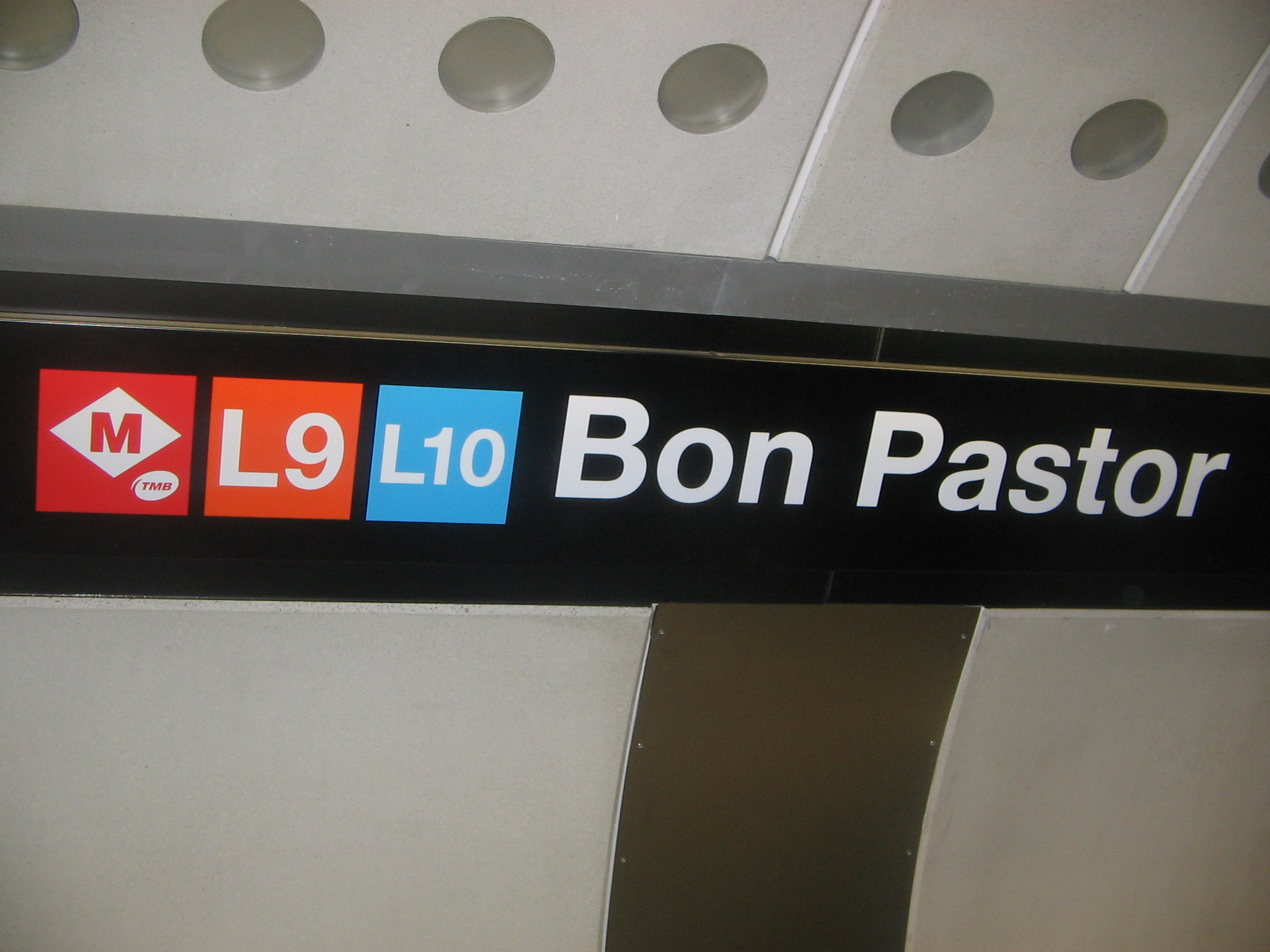
Closeup of one of the station platforms

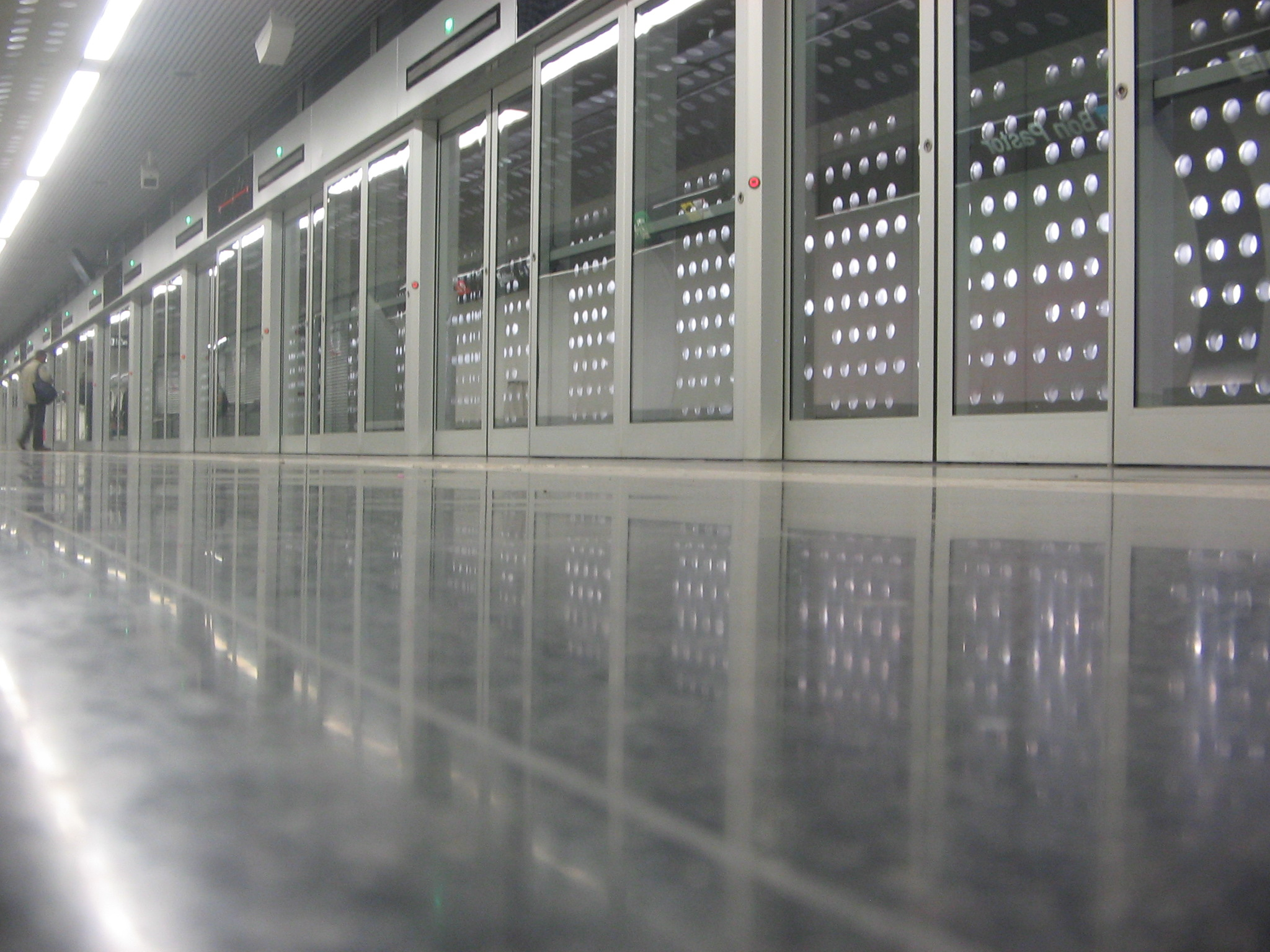
Platform screen doors on the platform toward Can Zam/Gorg stations
