= Parc Nou station =

Metro station in Barcelona, Spain

Parc Nou
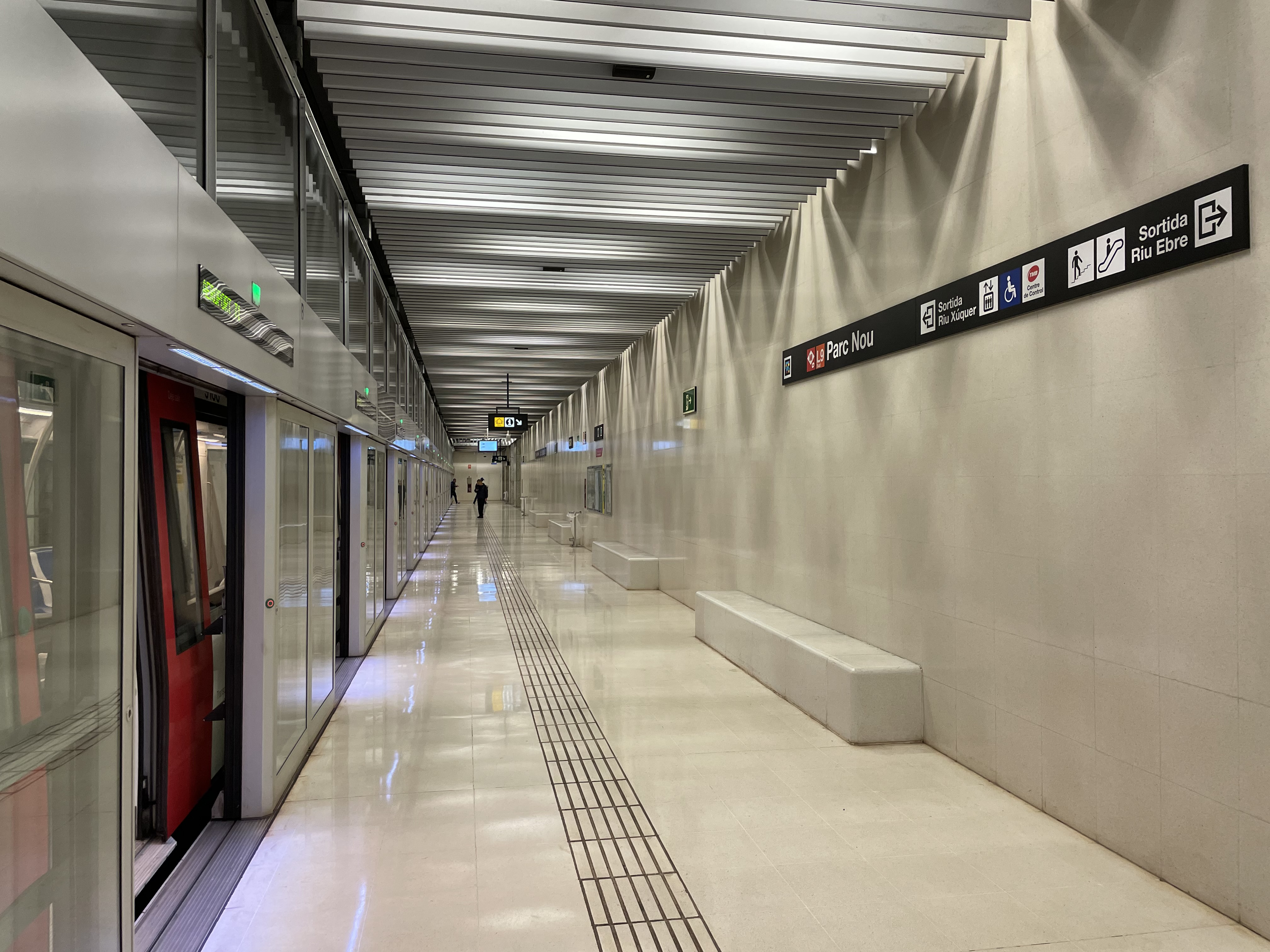
- Estació de Parc Nou

General information
- Location: Carrer Riu Llobregat, El Prat de Llobregat
- Coordinates: 41°19′00″N 2°05′19″E
- System: Barcelona Metro rapid transit station
- Owner: Transports Metropolitans de Barcelona

Construction
- Structure type: Underground

Other information
- Fare zone: 1 (ATM)

History
- Opened: 2016

Services
Preceding station	Metro	Following station
Mas Blau towards Airport T1	L9 Sud	Cèntric towards Zona Universitària
Projected
Mas Blau towards Airport T1	L2	Cèntric towards Badalona Pompeu Fabra
Mas Blau towards Airport T1	L9	Cèntric towards Can Zam
Location
- Location within Province of Barcelona Location within Spain

Parc Nou (Catalan pronunciation: [ˈparɡ ˈnɔw]) is a Barcelona Metro station, located in the El Prat de Llobregat municipality, in the Metropolitan area of Barcelona. The station is served by line L9.

The station is located underneath the Carrer Riu Llobregat. There are two entrances on the same street, which serve an underground ticket hall. The two 120-metre (390 ft) long side platforms are at a lower level.

The station was opened in 2016, when line L9 was extended from Zona Universitaria station to Aeroport T1 station.
