= Onze de Setembre station =

Metro station in Barcelona, Spain

Onze de Setembre
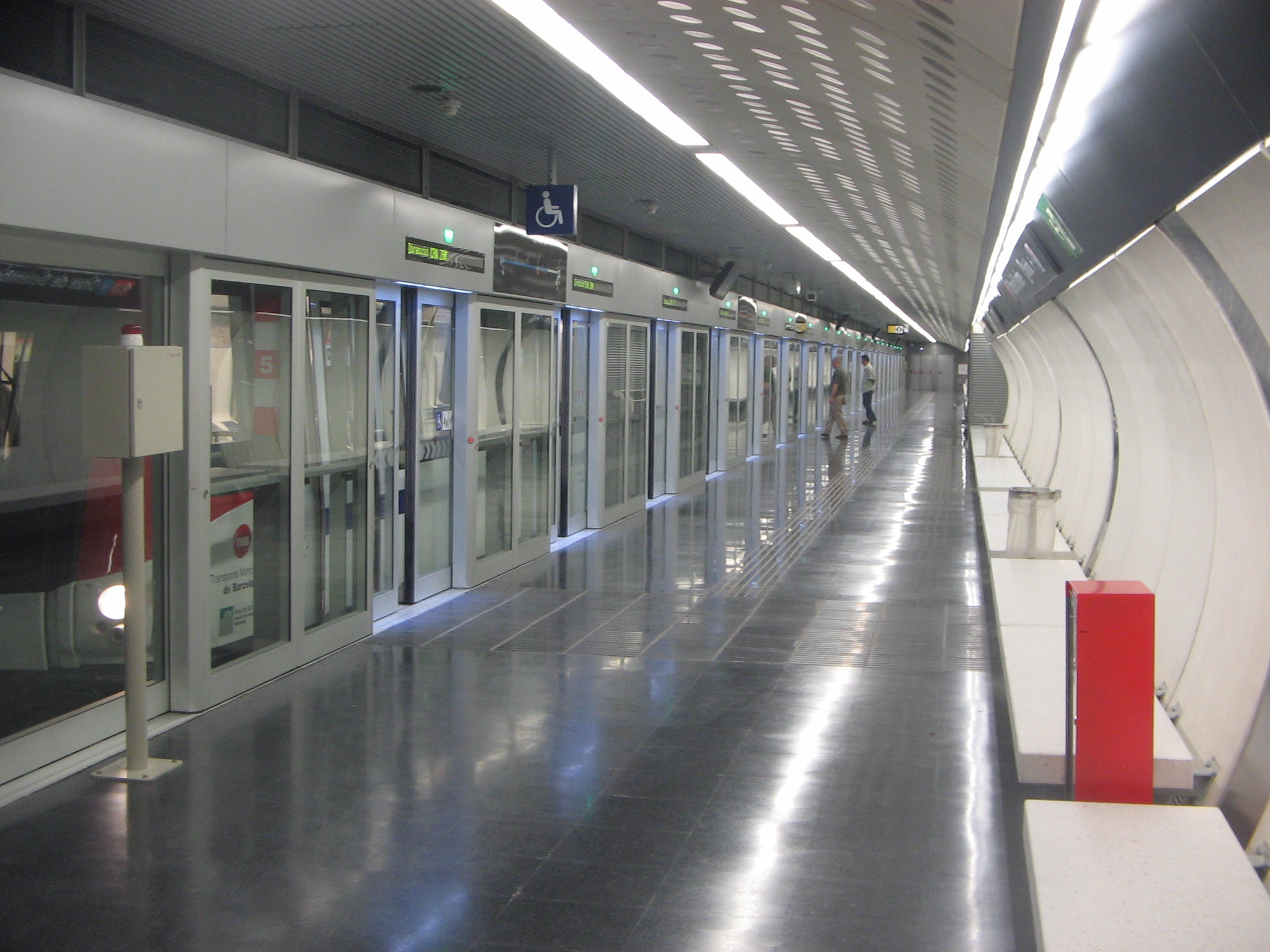
- A platform of the station

General information
- Location: Carrer de Virgili, s/n 08030 Barcelona; Spain
- Coordinates: 41°25′47.03″N 2°11′37.02″E
- System: TMB rapid transit station
- Operator: Transports Metropolitans de Barcelona
- Platforms: 2 split platforms
- Tracks: 2
- Connections: Local and interurban buses

Construction
- Structure type: Underground
- Depth: 31 metres (102 ft)
- Platform levels: 3
- Accessible: Yes

Other information
- Fare zone: 1 (Autoritat del Transport Metropolità)

History
- Opened: 26 June 2010

Services
Preceding station	Metro	Following station
La Sagrera Terminus	L9 Nord	Bon Pastor towards Can Zam
La Sagrera Terminus	L10 Nord	Bon Pastor towards Gorg
Projected
Sagrera | TAV towards Airport T1	L9	Bon Pastor towards Can Zam
Sagrera | TAV towards Polígon Pratenc	L10	Bon Pastor towards Gorg
Location

Onze de Setembre (Catalan pronunciation: [ˈonzə ðə səˈtembɾə]) is a Barcelona Metro station named after Rambla Onze de Setembre, one of the main streets in the neighbourhood of Sant Andreu de Palomar where it is located, part of Barcelona's district of Sant Andreu. It was opened with the opening of the L9/L10 section between Bon Pastor and La Sagrera stations on 26 June 2010. It is served by TMB-operated Barcelona Metro lines L9 and L10.

== Layout ==
The station is located exactly under the intersection of Rambla Onze de Setembre with Virgili street and was built like many other new L9 metro stations with a 31-meter depth and 30 meter diameter well. It is divided in three levels: the upper hall, the upper platform and the lower platform. The upper hall has an only access from the street equipped with escalators and elevators, making the station accessible for disabled persons. The upper hall has also ticket vending machines and a TMB Control Center. The upper platform is where run the trains toward La Sagrera and the lower platform is where run the trains toward Can Zam and Gorg stations. The architectural design of the station was designed by architect Tomàs Morató. There is a backlit mural by Àlex Ollé and Alfons Flores that covers most part of the station's well and represents the existing mood status.

== Gallery ==
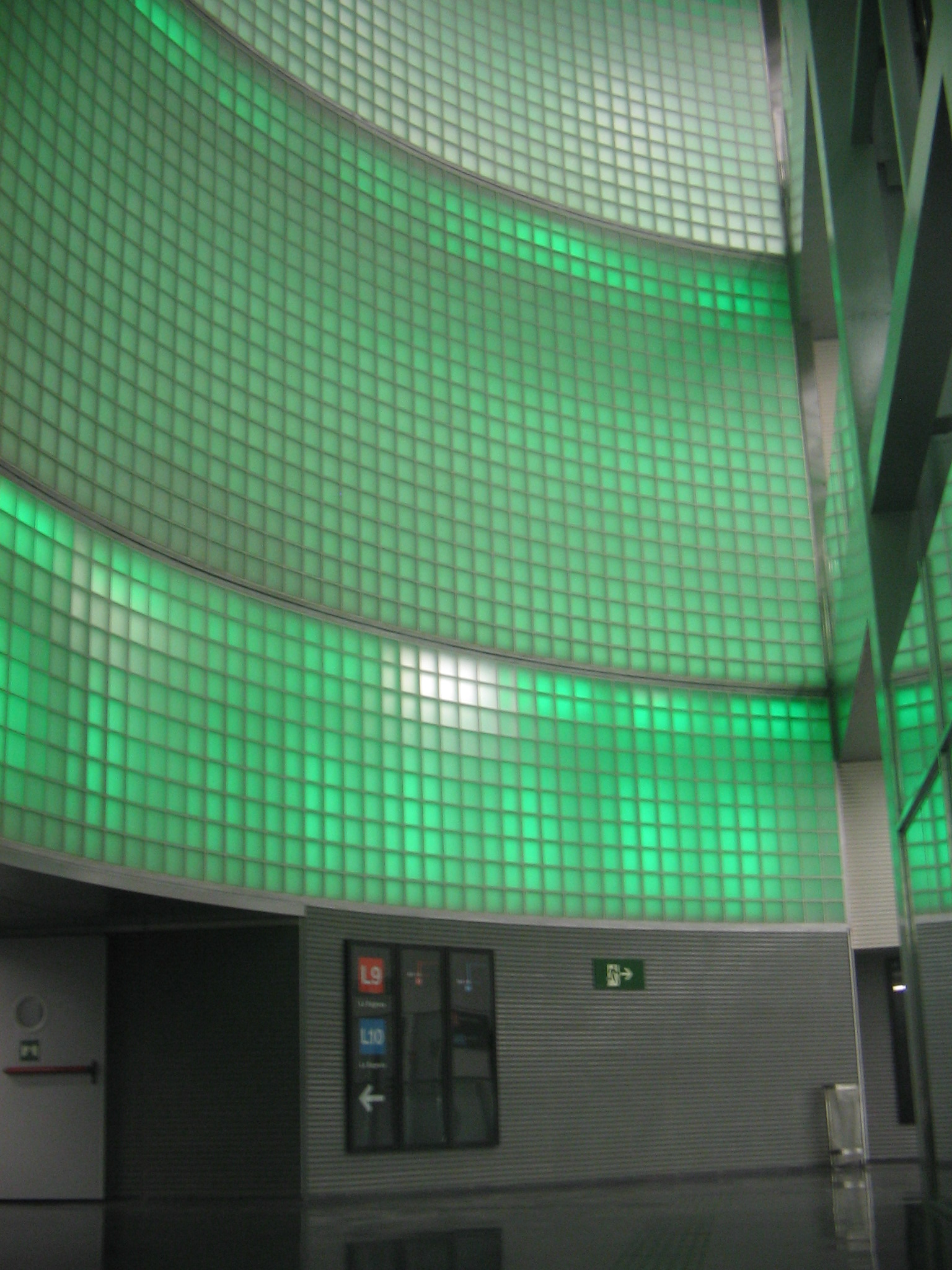
The backlit mural from the pre-platform level

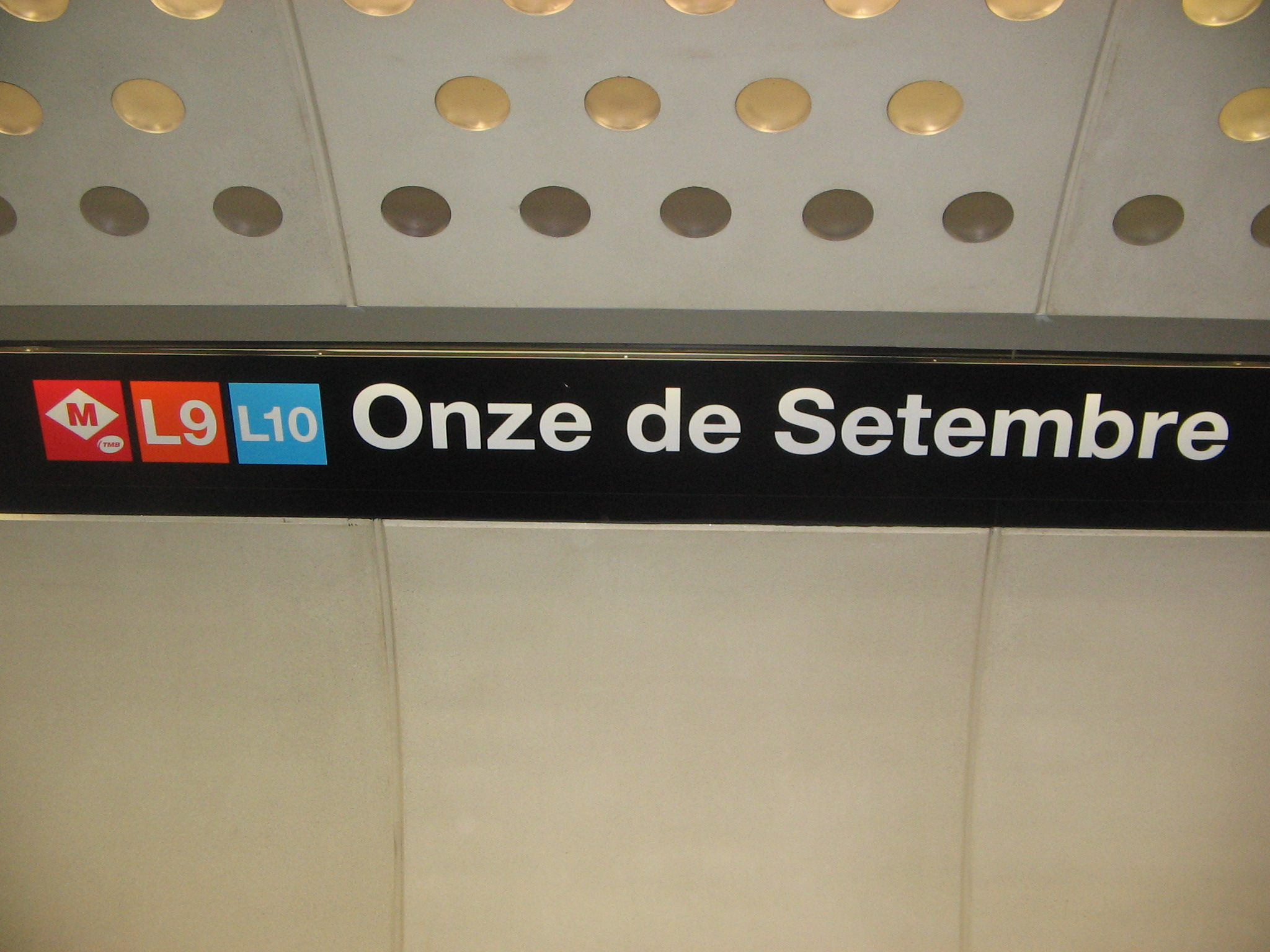
Closeup of one of the station platforms
