= Cèntric station =

Metro station in Barcelona, Spain

Cèntric
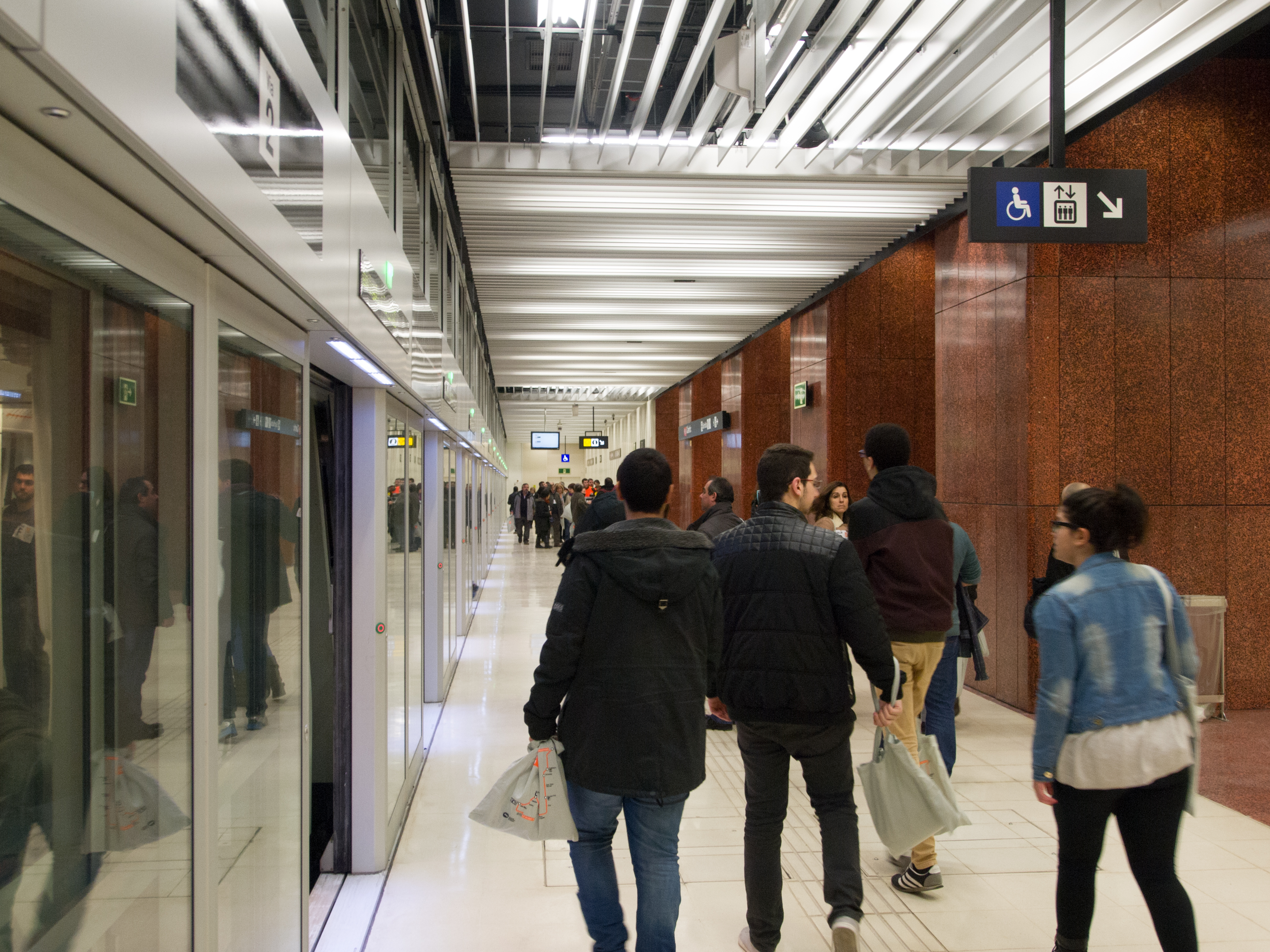

General information
- Location: Plaça de Catalunya, El Prat de Llobregat
- Coordinates: 41°19′18″N 2°05′37″E
- System: Barcelona Metro rapid transit station
- Owner: Transports Metropolitans de Barcelona

Construction
- Structure type: Underground

Other information
- Fare zone: 1 (ATM)

History
- Opened: 2016

Services
Preceding station	Metro	Following station
Parc Nou towards Airport T1	L9 Sud	El Prat Estació towards Zona Universitària
Projected
Parc Nou towards Airport T1	L2	El Prat Estació towards Badalona Pompeu Fabra
Parc Nou towards Airport T1	L9	El Prat Estació towards Can Zam
Location
- Location within Province of Barcelona Location within Spain

Cèntric (Catalan pronunciation: [ˈsɛntɾik]) is a Barcelona Metro station, located in the El Prat de Llobregat municipality, in the Metropolitan area of Barcelona. The station is served by line L9.

The station is located underneath the local Plaça de Catalunya. There are two entrances on the same square, one in the center and the other close to the Carrer de Lleida, which serve a below ground ticket hall. The two 100-metre (330 ft) long side platforms are at a lower level.

The station was opened in 2016, when line L9 was extended from Zona Universitaria station to Aeroport T1 station.
