= Les Moreres station =

Subway station of Barcelona

Les Moreres
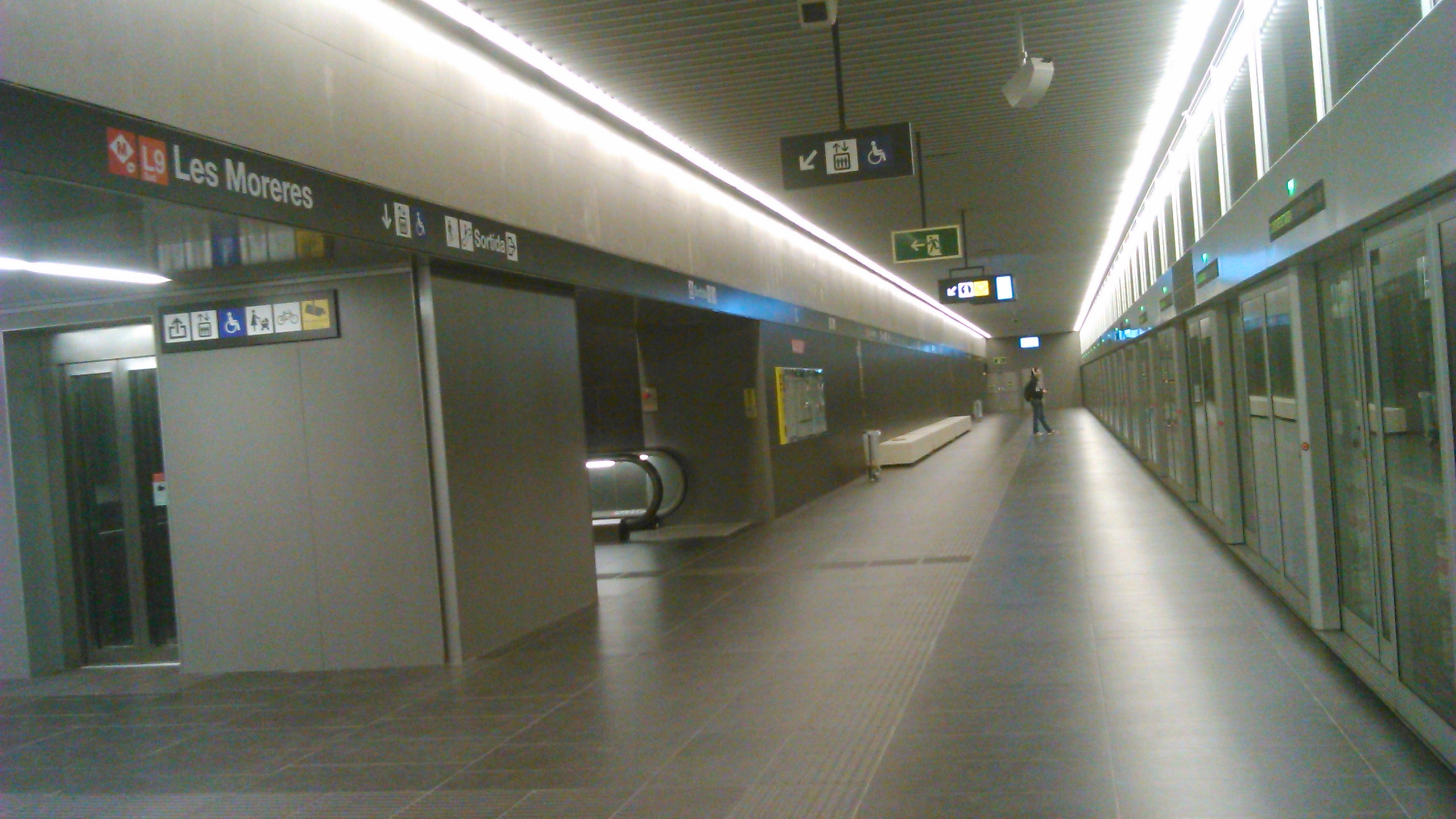
- Estació de les Moreres

General information
- Location: Av. de la Verge de Montserrat, El Prat de Llobregat
- Coordinates: 41°19′44″N 2°06′11″E
- System: Barcelona Metro rapid transit station
- Owner: Transports Metropolitans de Barcelona

Construction
- Structure type: Underground

Other information
- Fare zone: 1 (ATM)

History
- Opened: 2016

Services
Preceding station	Metro	Following station
El Prat Estació towards Airport T1	L9 Sud	Mercabarna towards Zona Universitària
Projected
La Ribera towards Airport T1	L2	Mercabarna towards Badalona Pompeu Fabra
La Ribera towards Airport T1	L9	Mercabarna towards Can Zam
Location
- Location within Province of Barcelona Location within Spain

Les Moreres (Catalan pronunciation: [ləz muˈɾeɾəs]) is a Barcelona Metro station, located in the El Prat de Llobregat municipality, in the Metropolitan area of Barcelona. The station is served by line L9.

The station is located underneath the square between Av. de la Verge de Montserrat and Carrer de les Moreres. There are two entrances at Av. de la Verge de Montserrat, which serve an underground ticket hall. The two 108-metre (354 ft) long side platforms are at a lower level.

The station was opened in 2016, when line L9 was extended from Zona Universitaria station to Aeroport T1 station.
