= Mercabarna station =

Metro station in Barcelona, Spain

Mercabarna
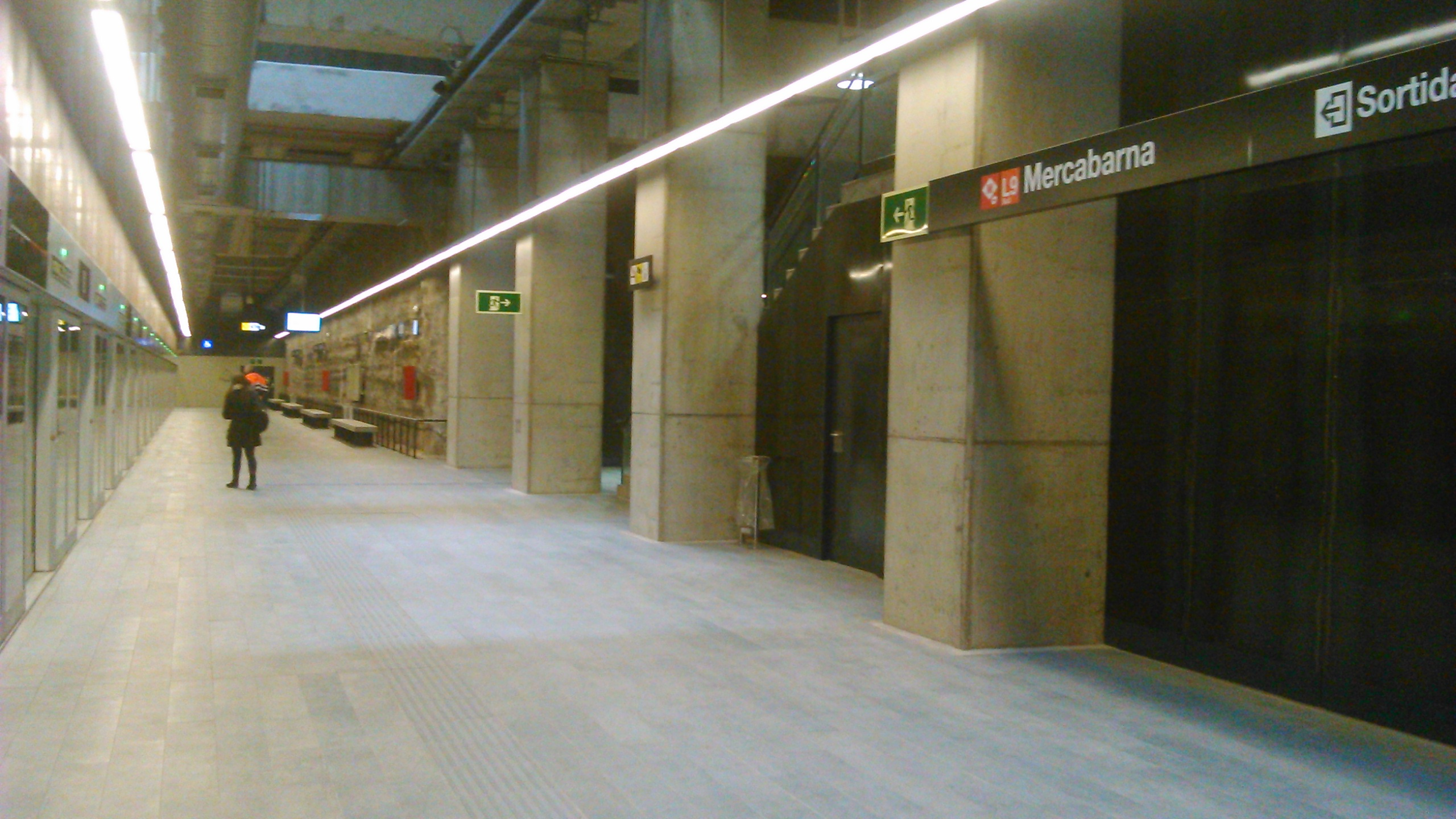

General information
- Location: Mercabarna, Barcelona
- Coordinates: 41°20′01″N 2°01′42″E
- System: Barcelona Metro rapid transit station
- Owner: Transports Metropolitans de Barcelona

Construction
- Structure type: Underground

Other information
- Fare zone: 1 (ATM)

History
- Opened: 2016

Services
Preceding station	Metro	Following station
Les Moreres towards Airport T1	L9 Sud	Parc Logístic towards Zona Universitària
Projected
Les Moreres towards Airport T1	L2	Parc Logístic towards Badalona Pompeu Fabra
Les Moreres towards Airport T1	L9	Parc Logístic towards Can Zam
Location
- Location within Province of Barcelona Location within Spain

Mercabarna (Catalan pronunciation: [mərkəˈβarnə]) is a Barcelona Metro station, located in the Mercabarna market complex of the Zona Franca in the Sants-Montjuïc district of Barcelona. The station is served by line L9.

The station is located underneath the western approach to the Mercabarna market, with its only entrance provided by a staircase and elevator at the intersection of Carrer K and the Carrer Transversal 6, with a ticket office below ground. The two 108-metre (354 ft) long side platforms are at a lower level.

The station was opened in 2016, at the time of the extension of line L9 from Zona Universitària station to Aeroport T1 station.
