= Parc Logístic station =

Barcelona metro station

Parc Logístic
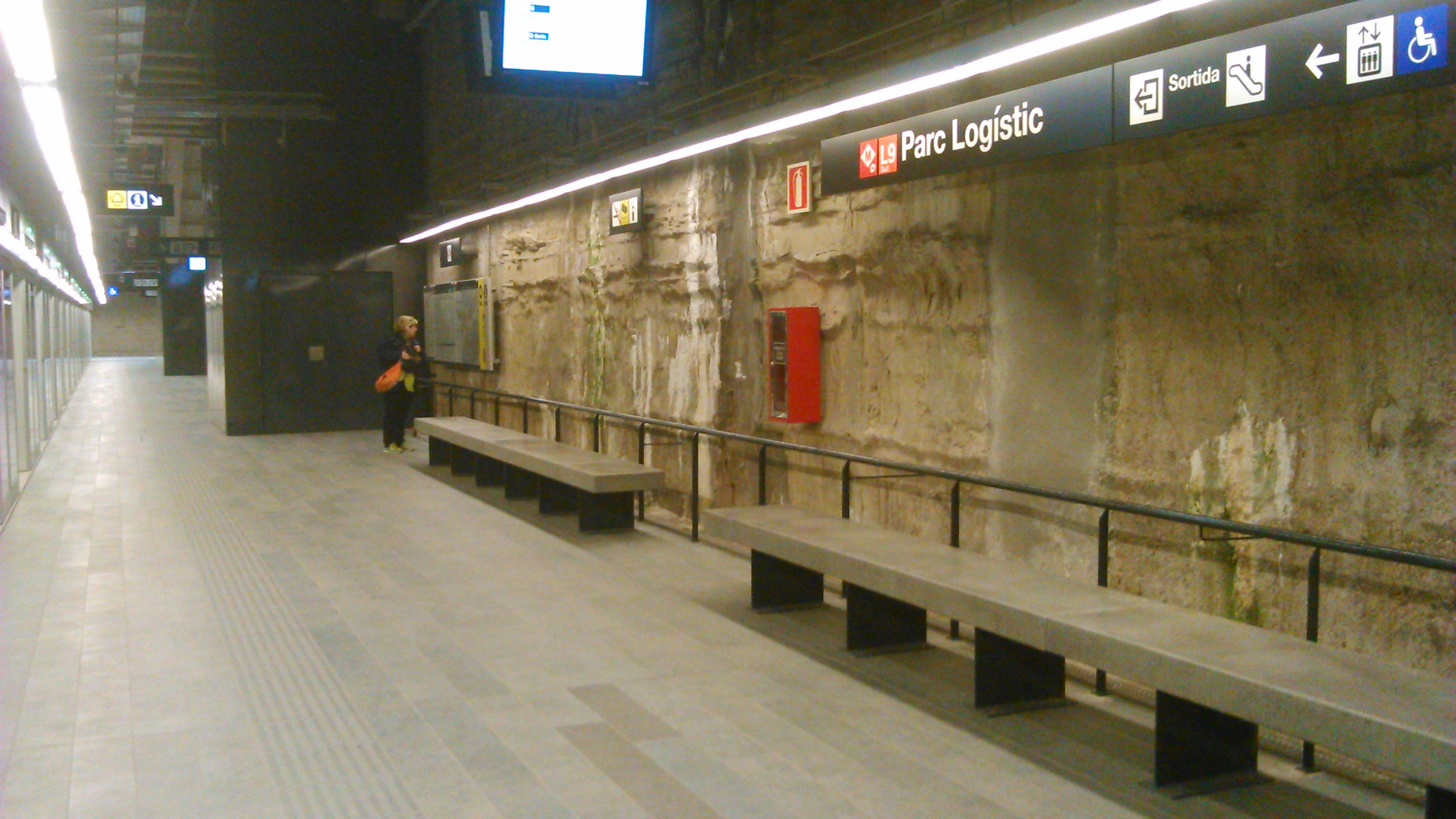
- Parc Logístic platform

General information
- Location: Avinguda Parc Logístic, Barcelona
- Coordinates: 41°20′29″N 2°07′39″E
- System: Barcelona Metro rapid transit station
- Owner: Transports Metropolitans de Barcelona

Construction
- Structure type: Underground

Other information
- Fare zone: 1 (ATM)

History
- Opened: 2016

Passengers
- 2024: 230,034

Services
Preceding station	Metro	Following station
Mercabarna towards Airport T1	L9 Sud	Fira towards Zona Universitària
Projected
Mercabarna towards Airport T1	L2	Fira towards Badalona Pompeu Fabra
Mercabarna towards Airport T1	L9	Fira towards Can Zam
Location
- Location within Province of Barcelona Location within Spain

Parc Logístic (Catalan pronunciation: [ˈparɡ luˈʒistik]) is a Barcelona Metro station, in the Zona Franca district of Barcelona. The station is served by line L9.

The station is located underneath the intersection of Avinguda Parc Logístic and the carrer de Número Vint i Cinc. There are two entrances at the same intersection, which serve a below ground ticket hall. The two 108-metre (354 ft) long side platforms are at a lower level. In 2024, it was the fifth least used station of the Barcelona Metro network, with 230,034 users.

The station was opened in 2016, at the time of the extension of line L9 from Zona Universitaria station to Aeroport T1 station.
