= Barcelona Metro line 9 =

Rapid transit line in Barcelona, Spain

Coordinates: 41°24′24.18″N 2°8′56.50″E

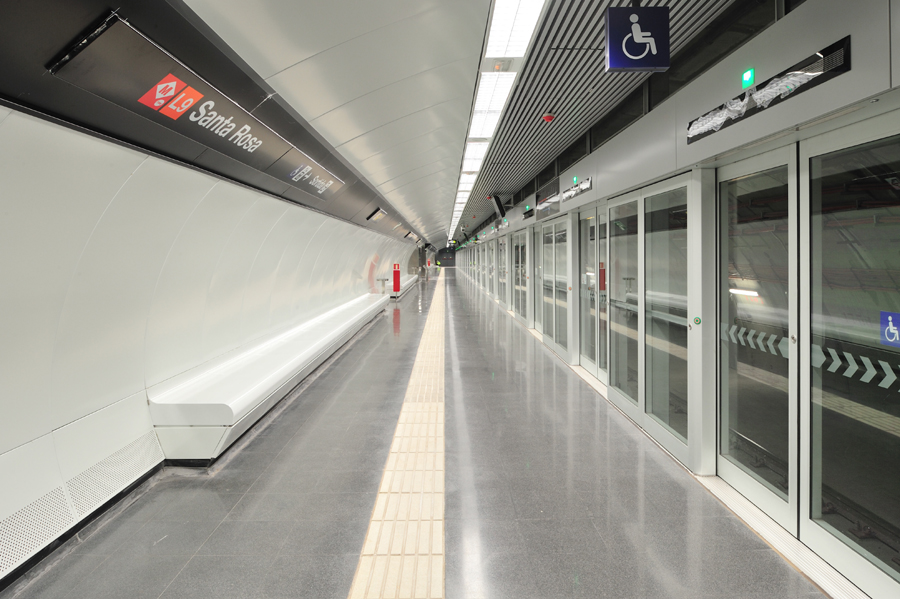
- Platform at Santa Rosa

Overview
- Service type: Rapid transit
- System: Barcelona Metro
- Status: Operational
- Locale: Barcelona metropolitan area
- First service: 2009; 17 years ago
- Current operator: TMB

Route
- Termini: Can Zam; Aeroport T1
- Stops: 24 (in operation); 37 (planned)
- Distance travelled: 27.5 km (17.1 mi) (in operation)

Technical
- Rolling stock: 9000 series
- Track gauge: 1,435 mm (4 ft 8 1/2 in)
- Electrification: 1,500 V DC rigid overhead wire
- Track owner: TMB

Line 9 (Catalan pronunciation: [ˈlini.ə ˈnɔw]), often known as Línia Taronja ([ˈlini.ə t(ə)ˈɾɔɲʒə]; Orange line), is a rapid transit line of the Barcelona Metro network. A fully-automated line, it started operation on December 13, 2009. Part of the line is still under construction, with 24 stations currently in operation in Barcelona, El Prat de Llobregat, L'Hospitalet de Llobregat, and Santa Coloma de Gramenet. The line is currently operated as two disconnected branches; the Aeroport T1 – Zona Universitària section is known as L9 South (L9 Sud in Catalan) while the La Sagrera – Can Zam portion is known as L9 North (L9 Nord in Catalan). The line's missing central section, expected to be completed by 2030, shares a significant portion of its tracks with Line 10.

== Lines 9 and 10 ==
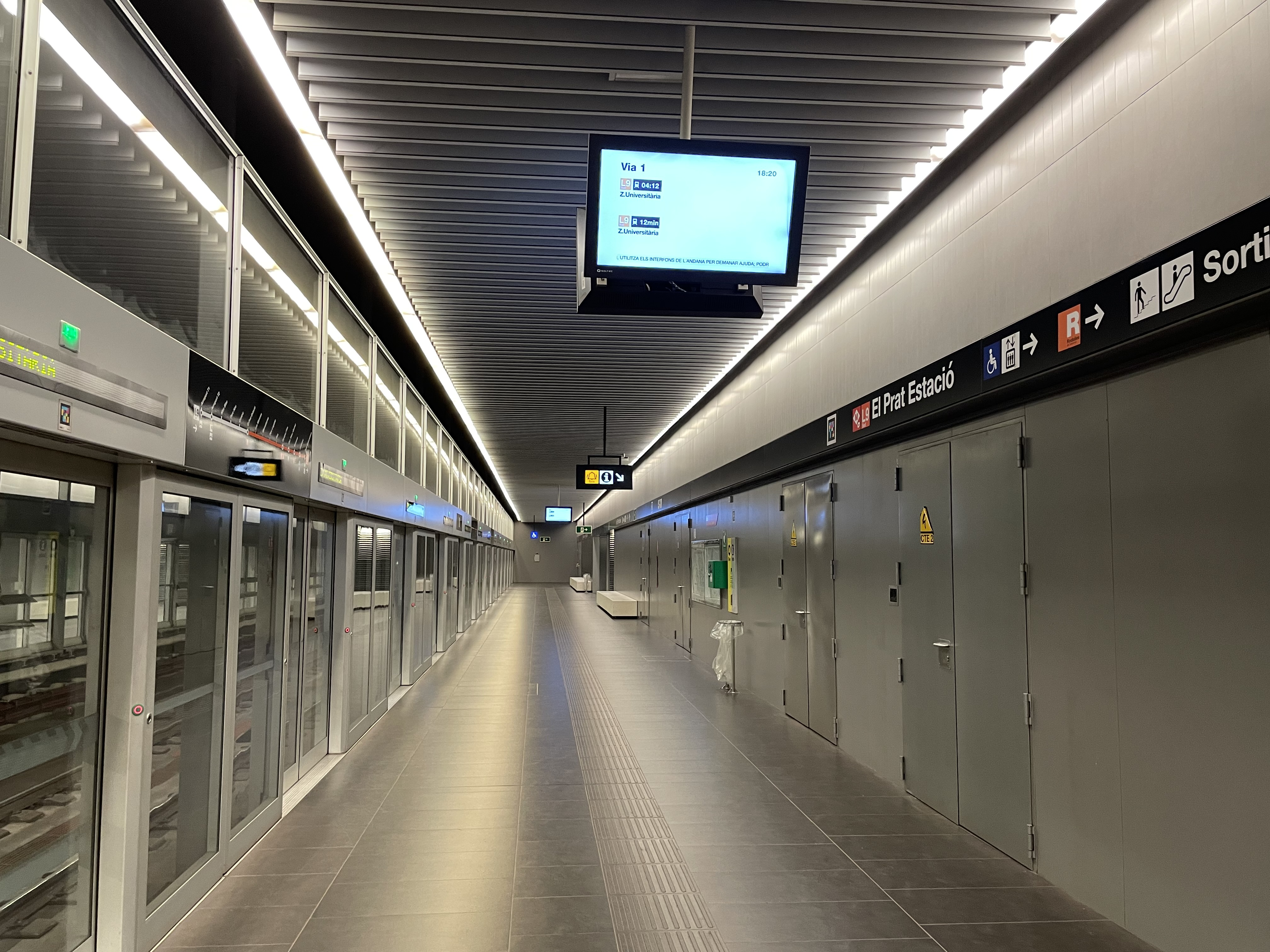
Platform at El Prat Estació

The complete project encompasses an underground line with two branches spanning a large portion of the metropolitan area of Barcelona, crossing Barcelona, Santa Coloma de Gramenet, Badalona, l'Hospitalet de Llobregat and El Prat de Llobregat. Transports Metropolitans de Barcelona is the company operating the line.

The name line 9 (L9) can refer either to the whole project of L9/L10 or to the common trunk plus the L9 branches. The total system will have a length of 47.8 km (29.7 mi), of which 43.71 km (27.16 mi) will be underground and 4.09 km (2.54 mi) will be on viaducts. L9/L10 will be the deepest line in the Barcelona network, with tunnels up to 80 metres (262 ft 6 in) below the surface, and some stations with platforms up to 60 metres (196 ft 10 in) below.

Line 9 shares its route with L10 for a large part. Its commercial speed is 37 kilometres per hour (23 mph).

== Construction ==
Train arriving at Aeroport T1

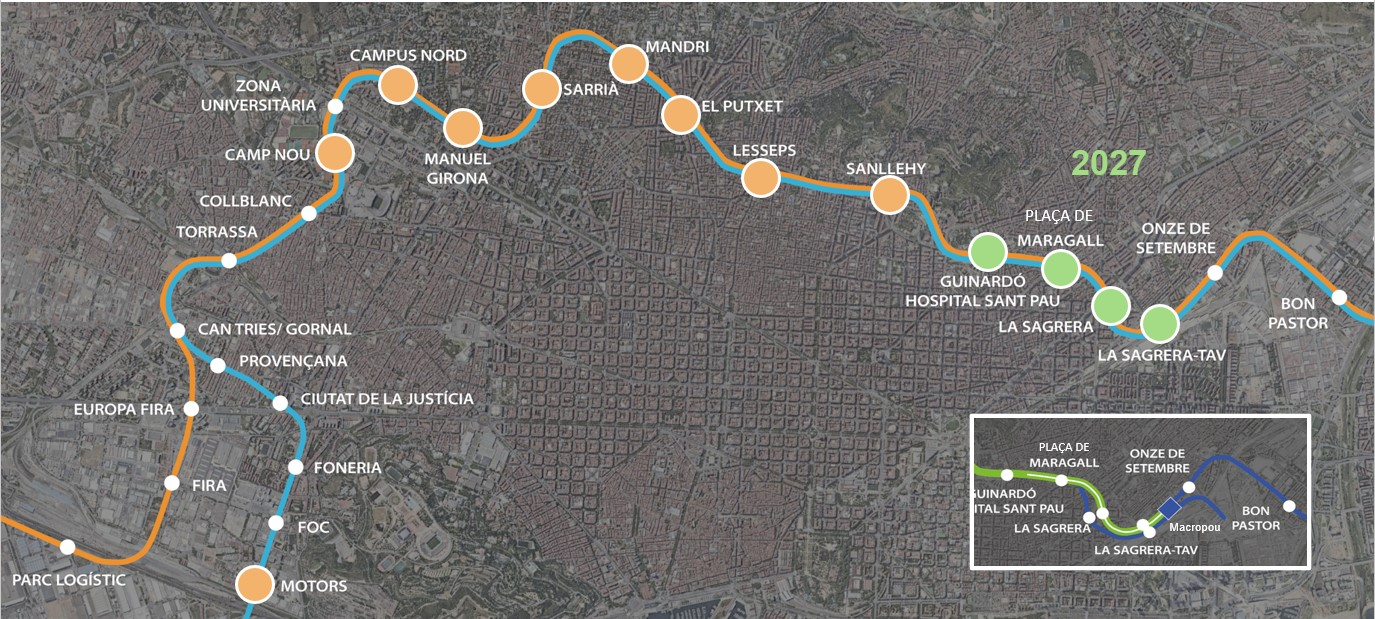
Current status of the project. The stations in green are expected to open by 2027

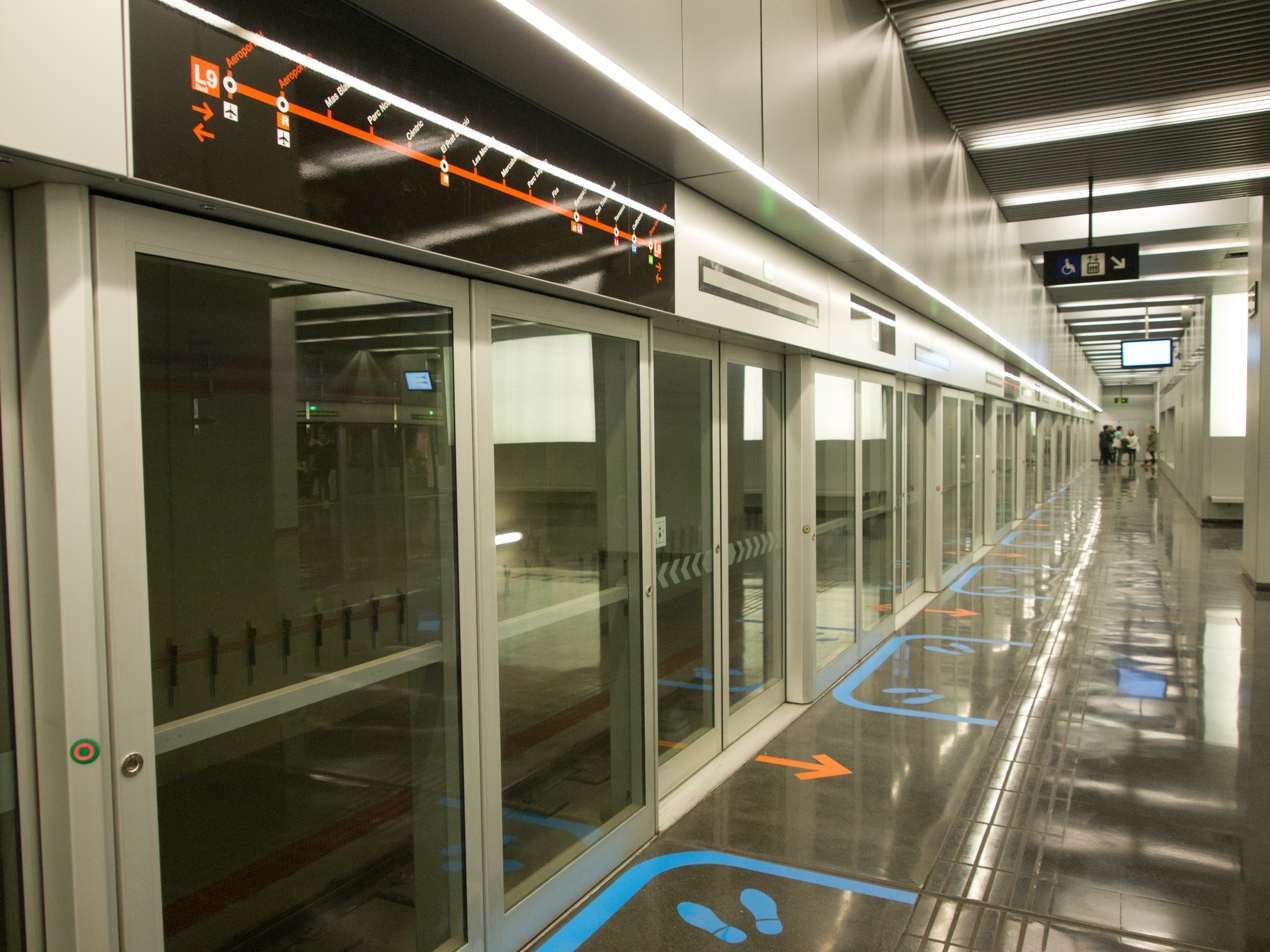
Platform at Aeroport T1

Map of the full Line 9 project (L9, L10 & L2)

Autoritat del Transport Metropolità approved the plan for metro and light rail lines in the Barcelona metropolitan area that included line 9 in 1999. The next year ATM began planning and design with construction starting in 2002.

Originally expected to be completed by 2008, ongoing problems with construction delayed its expected completion until as late as 2013–2014. It was subsequently further delayed to 2016. All tunneling work was stopped in 2011 due to a lack of funding, a decision taken by the Government of Catalonia in the aftermath of the 2008 financial crisis. As works wouldn't be resumed for more than a decade, all opening estimates would be discarded. 4.5 km of the line's central trunk still remained to be tunneled under upper Barcelona.

It wouldn't be until 2022, after 11 years of interruption, that tunneling works would be resumed to complete the line. The remaining 4.5 km of tunnel between Lesseps and Campus Nord are expected to be completed by 2030, with a 2-station extension from La Sagrera to Guinardó | Hospital de Sant Pau projected to be in service by 2027.

On 13 December 2009, the section between Can Peixauet and Can Zam, excluding Santa Rosa station, opened to the public. A further station, Bon Pastor, opened on 18 April 2010; as the first section of L10 was opened. The section from La Sagrera to Bon Pastor (excluding La Sagrera) opened on 26 June 2010.

On 12 February 2016 the El Prat branch opened from Aeroport T1 to Zona Universitària stations. This is a 20 km (12.4 mi) section with 15 stations. However, three stations – Aeroport Terminal de Càrrega, La Ribera and Camp Nou – did not open, as the first two were built to serve future developments and the latter had to remain closed due to technical reasons (as one of the line's main construction sites).

Line 9 is being bored by a single 11.95-metre (39 ft 2 in) tunnel boring machine (TBM) – where other metros bore a pair of tunnels, one for each direction, Line 9's wider tunnel is broad enough to stack two lines of tracks and for the route's stations.

Because the route passes through different geological conditions, the TBM is designed to replace the cutterheads with heads suited for the current conditions. In June 2010 the TBM's hard rock cutterhead was replaced with its original cutterhead, designed to bore through clay.

== Stations ==
=== L9 Nord ===
Station	Image	Location	Opened	Interchanges
Can Zam		Santa Coloma	13 December 2009	
Singuerlín		Santa Coloma	13 December 2009	
Església Major		Santa Coloma	13 December 2009	
Fondo		Santa Coloma	13 December 2009	Barcelona Metro Barcelona Metro line 1
Santa Rosa		Santa Coloma	19 September 2011	
Can Peixauet		Santa Coloma	13 December 2009	
Bon Pastor		Barcelona (Bon Pastor)	18 April 2010	Barcelona Metro Barcelona Metro line 10
Onze de Setembre		Barcelona (Sant Andreu de Palomar)	26 June 2010	Barcelona Metro Barcelona Metro line 10
La Sagrera		Barcelona (La Sagrera)	26 June 2010	Barcelona Metro Barcelona Metro line 1 Barcelona Metro line 5 Barcelona Metro line 10 Rodalies de Catalunya R3 (Rodalies de Catalunya) R4 (Rodalies de Catalunya)

=== L9 Sud ===
Station	Image	Location	Opened	Interchanges
Zona Universitària		Barcelona (Les Corts)	12 February 2016	Barcelona Metro Barcelona Metro line 3 Trambaix
Collblanc		L'Hospitalet	12 February 2016	Barcelona Metro Barcelona Metro line 5 Barcelona Metro line 10
Torrassa		L'Hospitalet	12 February 2016	Barcelona Metro Barcelona Metro line 1 Barcelona Metro line 10
Can Tries - Gornal		L'Hospitalet	12 February 2016	Barcelona Metro Barcelona Metro line 10
Europa-Fira		L'Hospitalet	12 February 2016	Ferrocarrils de la Generalitat de Catalunya Barcelona Metro line 8 Llobregat–Anoia Line
Fira		L'Hospitalet	12 February 2016	
Parc Logístic		Barcelona (Zona Franca)	12 February 2016	
Mercabarna		Barcelona (Zona Franca)	12 February 2016	
Les Moreres		El Prat	12 February 2016	
El Prat Estació		El Prat	12 February 2016	Rodalies de Catalunya R2 (Rodalies de Catalunya)
Cèntric		El Prat	12 February 2016	
Parc Nou		El Prat	12 February 2016	
Mas Blau		El Prat	12 February 2016	
Aeroport T2		El Prat	12 February 2016	Rodalies de Catalunya R2 (Rodalies de Catalunya)
Aeroport T1		El Prat	12 February 2016	

== Extra cost ==
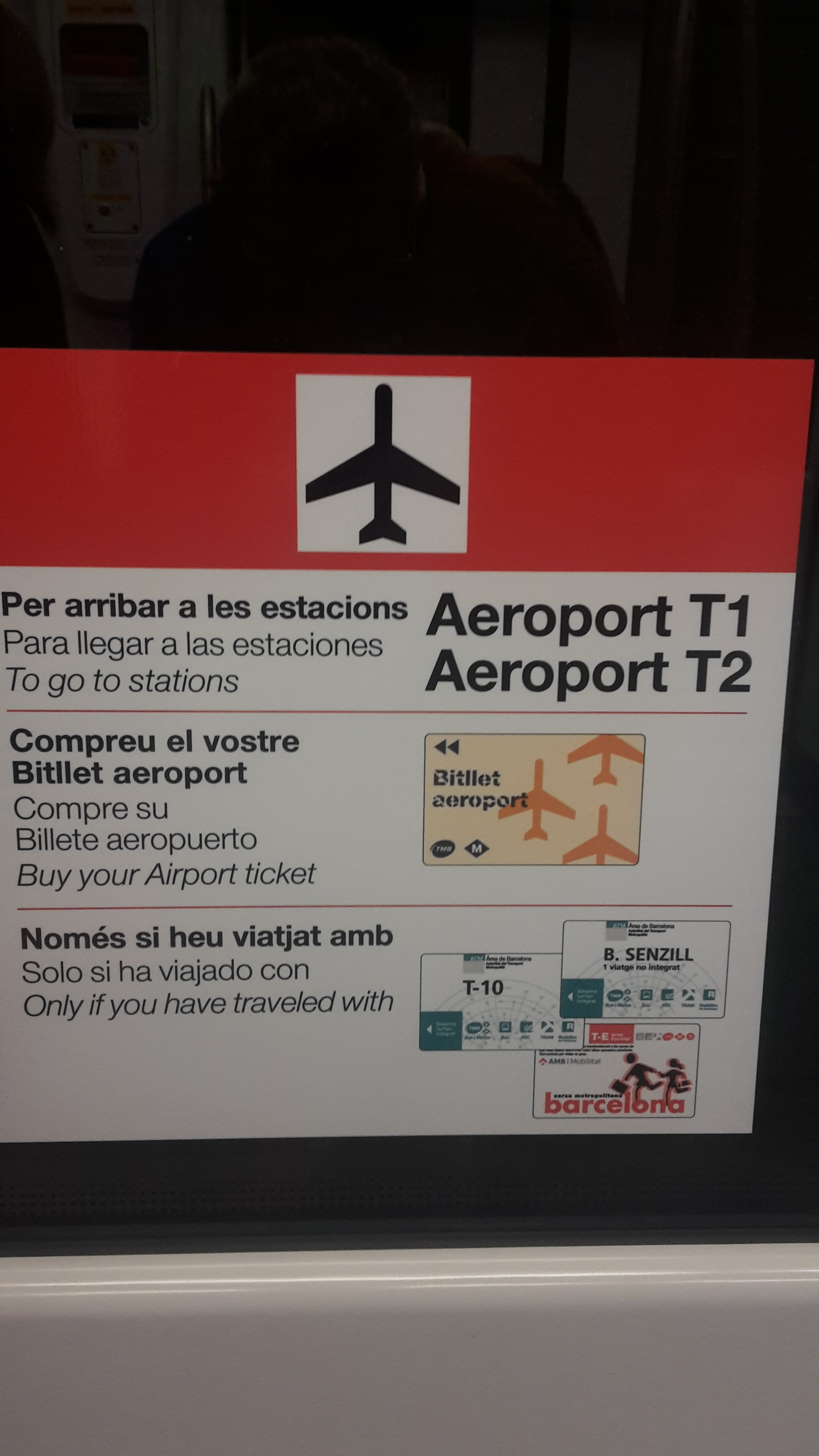
Accessing either of the airport stations requires a valid ticket, as announced on the ticket vending machines and inside the trains. An Airport Ticket is available for 5.15 euros.

Entering or exiting the line from the Barcelona Airport stations, Aeroport T1 and Aeorport T2 requires a valid ticket. A Single Ticket (Bitllet Senzill), a T-casual (formerly T-10), or a T-familiar are not considered valid, and will not allow exiting the line through these stations. An Airport Ticket can be purchased before exiting the metro. All time-based tickets with unlimited journeys (daily, monthly, quarterly or Hola BCN! tickets) are considered valid, and passengers travelling with them do not need to purchase any additional tickets to access these stations.
