= Mercabarna =

Wholesale market in Barcelona

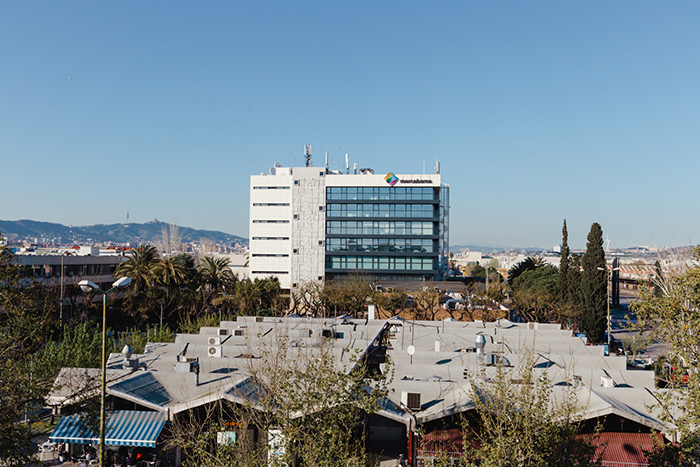
Mercabarna Management Center

Mercabarna is a food-trading estate that concentrates wholesale markets (fruit and vegetables, fish and flowers) and Barcelona's abattoir, as well as a large area of complementary activities (ZAC), boasting some 450 fresh-food preparation, commercial, distribution, importing and exporting businesses. A total of 700 businesses are located within its 90-hectare site. It supplies over ten million people and is a benchmark market worldwide.

Mercabarna, as public limited company, was founded in 1967 in Barcelona.

In the past, wholesale food markets were situated in central locations within the city of Barcelona and occupied buildings which are now used for important social, cultural and leisure facilities. The growth of the city and of its population led to problems of all kinds for these central markets in terms of capacity, communications, the environment and so forth. Gradually, therefore, they relocated to the Mercabarna precinct.

In 2019 it sold 2,355,293 tons of food, 4.2% more than in 2018. The turnover of the companies that sell there exceeds 5 billion euros. The economic crisis resulting from the COVID-19 pandemic negatively impacted the sales of some of these businesses, especially those in the hospitality and catering sector.

== Markets ==
- Central Fruit and Vegetable Market
- Central Fish Market
- The Slaughterhouse
- Mercabarna-flor (located in Sant Boi de Llobregat, in a building next to Barcelona Airport)

== The Complementary Activities Zone (ZAC) ==
It also includes the ZAC, comprised by the complementary activities of the food market:

- Companies specialising in the handling, ripening, preparation, packaging, conservation, distribution, importing and exporting of all types of fresh and frozen products.
- The purchasing centres of the large food distribution chains (supermarkets, greengrocer chains, etc.) that source their fresh produce in Mercabarna.
- Companies that specialise in supplying the catering industry.
- Logistics companies specialising in food and other support services: large cold-chain logistic operators, transport companies, quality control laboratories, packaging companies, auto repair shops, banks, restaurants, hotels, petrol stations, day-care centres, chemists, IT companies, courier services, consulting firms, hardware stores, etc.

== See also ==
- Mercabarna Metro Station
- Zona Franca (Barcelona)
