= Mas Blau station =

Mas Blau
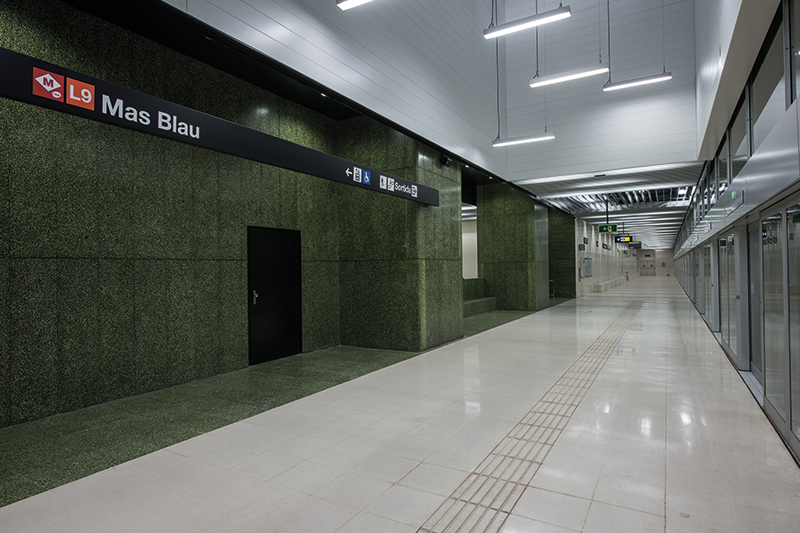

General information
- Location: Polígon industrial Mas Blau, El Prat de Llobregat
- Coordinates: 41°18′45″N 2°04′23″E
- System: Barcelona Metro rapid transit station
- Owner: Transports Metropolitans de Barcelona

Construction
- Structure type: Underground

Other information
- Fare zone: 1 (ATM)

History
- Opened: 2016

Passengers
- 2024: 463,777

Services
| Preceding station | Metro | Following station |
|---|---|---|
| Airport T2 towards Airport T1 | L9 Sud | Parc Nou towards Zona Universitària |
Projected
| Airport T2 towards Airport T1 | L2 | Parc Nou towards Badalona Pompeu Fabra |
| Airport T2 towards Airport T1 | L9 | Parc Nou towards Can Zam |
Location
- Location within Province of Barcelona Location within Spain

Mas Blau (Catalan pronunciation: [ˈmaz ˈβlaw]) is a Barcelona Metro station, located in the El Prat de Llobregat municipality, in Barcelona metropolitan area. The station is served by line L9.

The station is located at the Mas Blau industrial park, which serves logistical, automotive and technological enterprises. Its only entrance is by the Carrer Alta Ribagorça, which serves an underground ticket hall. The two 100-metre (330 ft) long side platforms are at a lower level.

The station was opened in 2016, when line L9 was extended from Zona Universitaria station to Aeroport T1 station.

In 2024, it was the tenth least used station in the Barcelona Metro network according to official TMB data, with 463,777 passengers.
