= Can Peixauet station =

Metro station in Catalonia, Spain

Can Peixauet
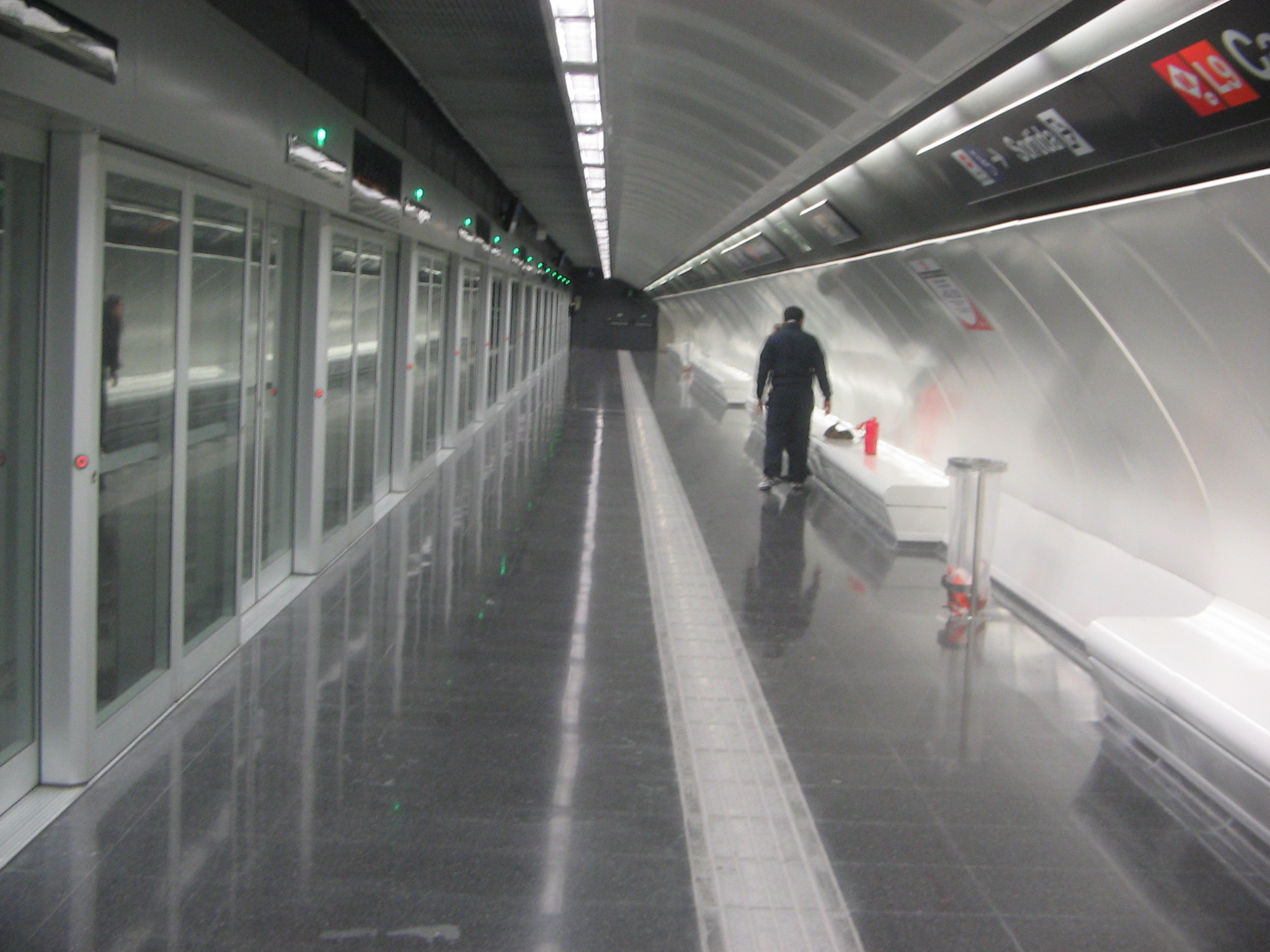
- Upper platform of the station

General information
- Location: Avinguda Santa Coloma, s/n 08922 Santa Coloma de Gramenet
- Coordinates: 41°26′40.33″N 2°12′35.65″E
- System: TMB rapid transit station
- Operator: Transports Metropolitans de Barcelona
- Platforms: 2 split platforms
- Tracks: 2

Construction
- Structure type: Underground
- Depth: 40 metres (130 ft)
- Platform levels: 4
- Accessible: yes

Other information
- Fare zone: 1 (Autoritat del Transport Metropolità)

History
- Opened: 13 December 2009

Services
Preceding station	Metro	Following station
Bon Pastor towards La Sagrera	L9 Nord	Santa Rosa towards Can Zam
Projected
Bon Pastor towards Airport T1	L9	Santa Rosa towards Can Zam
Location

Can Peixauet (Catalan pronunciation: [ˈkam pəʃəˈwɛt]) is the name of a Barcelona Metro line 9 station named after Avinguda de Can Peixauet, situated in Santa Coloma de Gramenet municipality.

The station was opened in December 2009 with the opening of the line from Can Zam to this station. It is located under Avinguda de Can Peixauet and Avinguda de Santa Coloma, and it was built like many other new L9 metro stations with a 40-metres-depth and 25-metres-diameter well. The station is divided into four levels: the upper hall, the pre-platform, the upper platform and the lower platform. The upper hall has an only access from the street, equipped with escalators and elevators. The upper hall has also ticket vending machines and a TMB Control Center. The upper platform is where the trains run towards La Sagrera and the lower platform is where the trains run towards Can Zam station. The architectural design of the station was designed by Sanchez-Piulachs Architects.

== Gallery ==
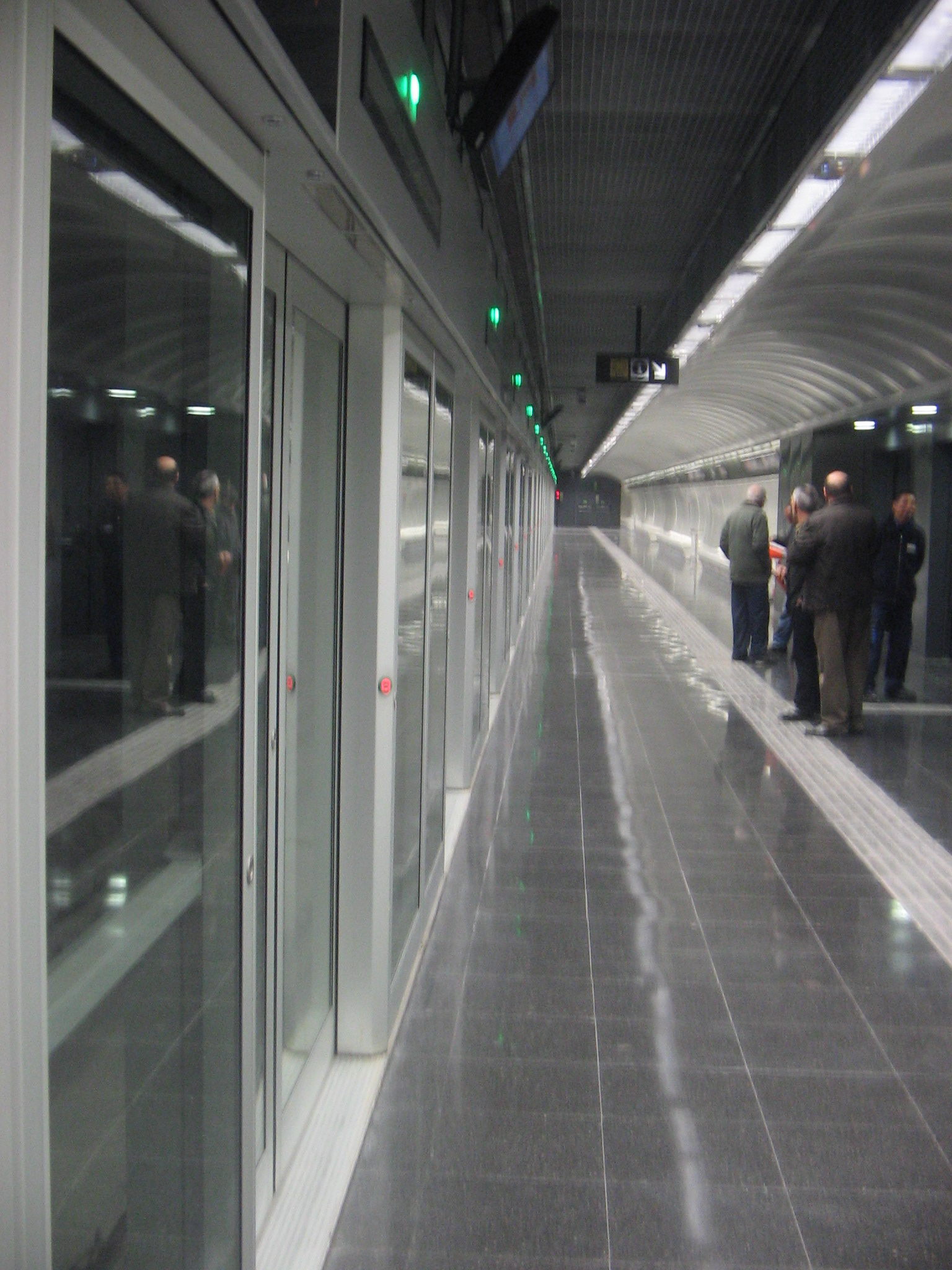
Another view of the platform

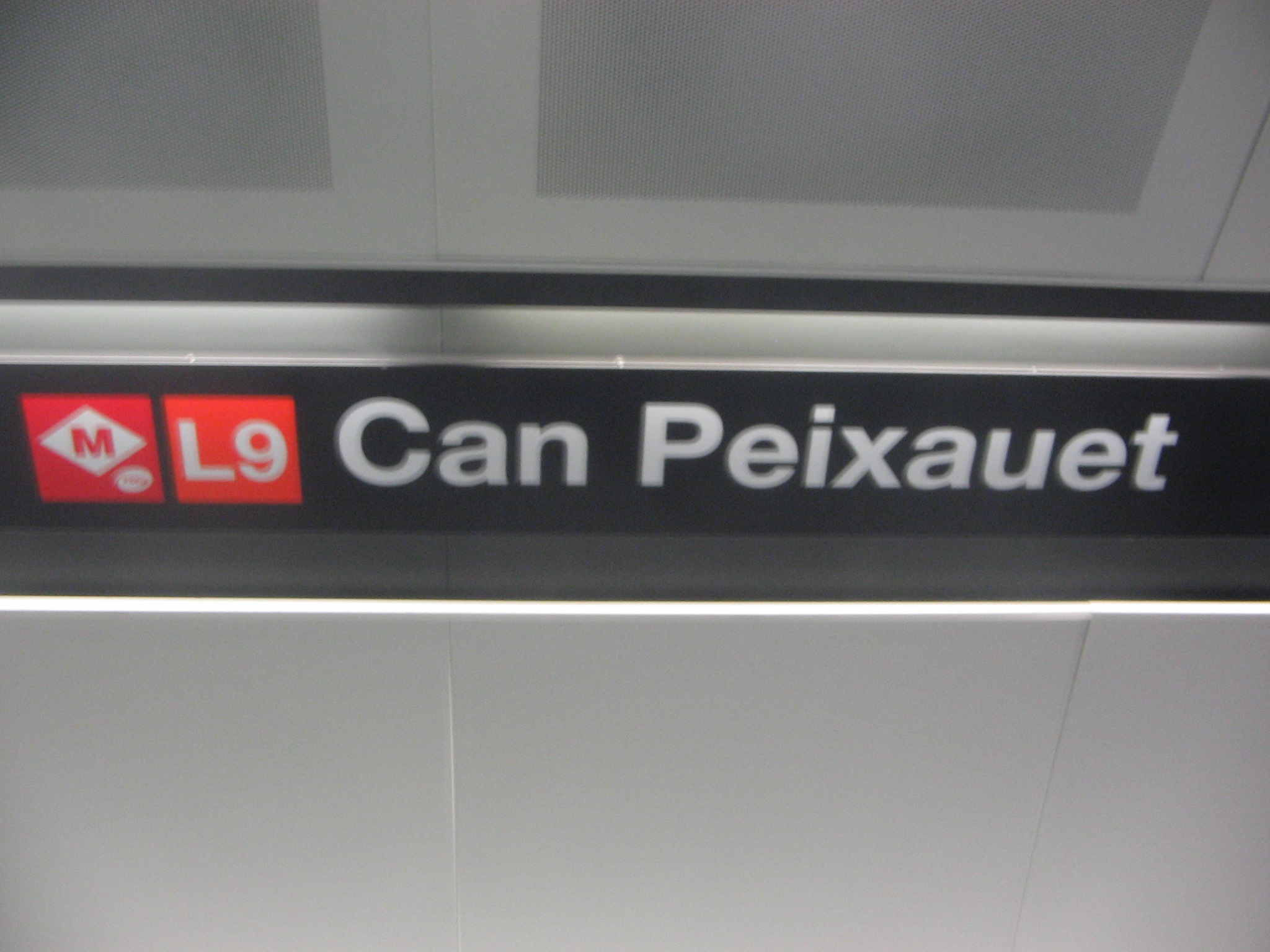
Closeup of the station
