= Santa Coloma de Gramenet =

Municipality in Catalonia, Spain

Santa Coloma de Gramenet Santa Coloma de Gramanet
- Municipality
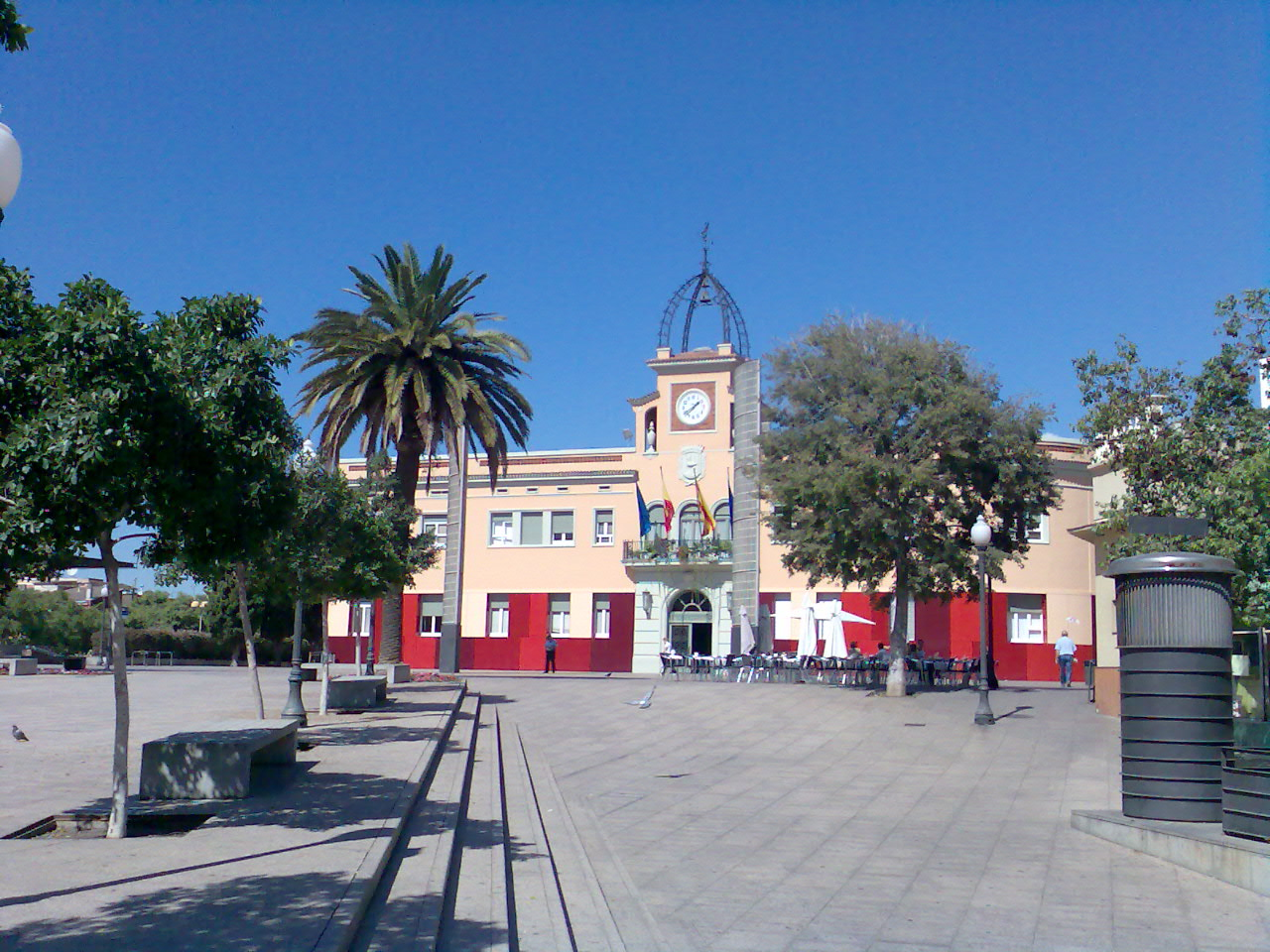
- Town Hall

- Flag Coat of arms
- Location of Santa Coloma de Gramenet
- Location in Barcelonès county

- Location within Catalonia Location within Spain
- Coordinates: 41.454°N 2.211°E
- Country: Spain
- Community: Catalonia
- Region: Barcelona
- County: Barcelonès
- Province: Barcelona

Government
  - Mayor: Mireia González (2024) (PSC)

Area
  - Total: 7.09 km^{2} (2.74 sq mi)
- Elevation: 56 m (184 ft)

Population (2025)
  - Total: 123,250
  - Density: 17,400/km^{2} (45,000/sq mi)
- Demonym(s): Colomenc, -ca (ca); Colomense (es)
- Website: www.gramenet.cat

Santa Coloma de Gramenet, (Note: Pronunciation of Santa Coloma de Gramenet (official): [ˈsantə kuˈlomə ðə ɣɾəməˈnɛt]) also known in Spanish as Santa Coloma de Gramanet, (Note: Pronunciation of Santa Coloma de Gramanet: [ˈsanta koˈloma ðe ɣɾamaˈnet]) informally simply known as Santa Coloma, and formerly as Gramenet de Besòs (Spanish: Gramanet del Besós) between 1936 and 1939, is a municipality in the comarca of Barcelonès in the province of Barcelona in the autonomous community of Catalonia in Spain. It is situated on the south-east side of the coastal range, with the Puig Castellar (299 m) as its highest point, on the left bank of the Besòs river: the municipalities of Sant Adrià de Besòs and Badalona separate it from the coast. With a population of 123,250, it is the 9th-largest city in Catalonia and the 55th-largest city in Spain.

The area has been inhabited since at least the Iberic period, and the remains of an Iberic village have been found on Puig Castellar. The artefacts are housed in a museum in La Torre Balldovina, a building dating from the 18th century. Other notable buildings include the renaissance palace of La Torre Pallaresa and the noucentista Clínica Mental.

In November 2008, the city made worldwide news by installing solar panels on top of crypts in the local cemetery, in an effort to help fight climate change.

== History ==
Various archaeological finds from the Neolithic and Eneolithic times, discovered within the Santa Coloma de Gramenet area, reveal the presence of human groups at least from the year 3500 BC. It seems that between the 10th and 6th centuries BC. Several migrations from the north arrived in the area that converged a short time later in the settlement of the Iberian tribe of Layetanos, established in the 6th or 5th century B.C. in Puig Castellar, in the extreme north of the current municipality.

They occupied the entire coastal strip from Sitges to Blanes, and their culture survived until the strong impact of the Roman conquest (3rd century B.C.) marked the beginning of their progressive extinction. The town of Puig Castellar was probably abandoned at the beginning of the 2nd century B.C.

There are hardly any data on the population in Roman and Visigothic times. It seems that there were several villages scattered in the valley, near the Besòs, very influenced by the neighboring cities: Baetulo (Badalona), active until the 2nd century A.D., and Barcino (Barcelona).

After the relative abandonment of the Saracen invasion, from the 9th century the repopulation of the sector began. The new settlers, coming from the north, had to know the tradition of the martyrdom of Santa Coloma (Santa Columba de Sens, sacrificed by the Romans in Gaul in the year 274, when she was only 17 years old) and it is probable that a pre-Romanesque church was dedicated to her. which was destroyed by Almanzor in 985.

A Romanesque temple was built in the same place, documented since 1019, which survived as a parish church for more than seven centuries. Around this church the first urban nucleus began to form, which coexisted with some old farmhouses.

== Demographics ==
As of 2025, the population is 123,250, of which 49.5% are males, and 50.5% are females. Minors make up 17.3% of the population, and seniors make up 19.4%.

Historical population

Year	Pop.	±%
1842	588	—
1857	1,304	+121.8%
1877	1,583	+21.4%
1887	1,552	−2.0%
1900	1,508	−2.8%
1910	1,836	+21.8%
1920	2,684	+46.2%
1930	8,777	+227.0%
1940	17,235	+96.4%

Year	Pop.	±%
1950	14,638	−15.1%
1960	32,277	+120.5%
1970	105,880	+228.0%
1981	140,613	+32.8%
1991	133,138	−5.3%
2001	112,992	−15.1%
2011	119,391	+5.7%
2021	118,489	−0.8%

Source: INE

=== Immigration ===
Foreign population by country of birth (2025)
Country	Population
Morocco	4,952
China	3,960
Pakistan	3,641
Ecuador	3,536
Colombia	2,536
Honduras	2,518
India	2,024
Dominican Republic	1,996
Peru	1,834
Bangladesh	1,830
Bolivia	1,272
Brazil	1,063
Venezuela	1,054
Argentina	642
Ukraine	426

As of 2025, immigrants make up 32.1% of the population. The 5 largest foreign countries of birth are Morocco, China, Pakistan, Ecuador, and Colombia.

== Sights ==
=== Town Hall and the Plaza de la Vila ===
The Plaza de la Vila, with its corresponding urbanization, emerged at the end of the s. XIX in the lands of the disappeared farmhouse of Can Pascali.

The first nucleus of buildings, known as Casa de la Villa or New Town Hall, dates from the year 1886 and consisted of the municipal government offices, together with the court-prison and a school.

=== Església Major ===
This temple, dedicated to Santa Coloma (martyr), was built between 26 May 1912, when the first stone was laid and 5 September 1915, when it was inaugurated. It is one of the last neo-Gothic buildings to be built in Catalonia between the last of the 19th century and the beginning of the 20th century. A new interpretation of medieval Gothic made with a good dose of freedom.

On the exterior façade there is a pointed window instead of the typical rose window with a stained glass window that represents the Virgin of Montserrat. The mid-rise octagonal bell tower is topped by a conical black tile pinnacle reminiscent of Northern Europe. At the same time, we find some details of Catalan Modernism of the time, such as the ornamentation that surrounds the upper part of the bell tower based on pointed battlements and Greek crosses. A notable feature of the entire exterior is its verticality that gives it a "transcendent" air.

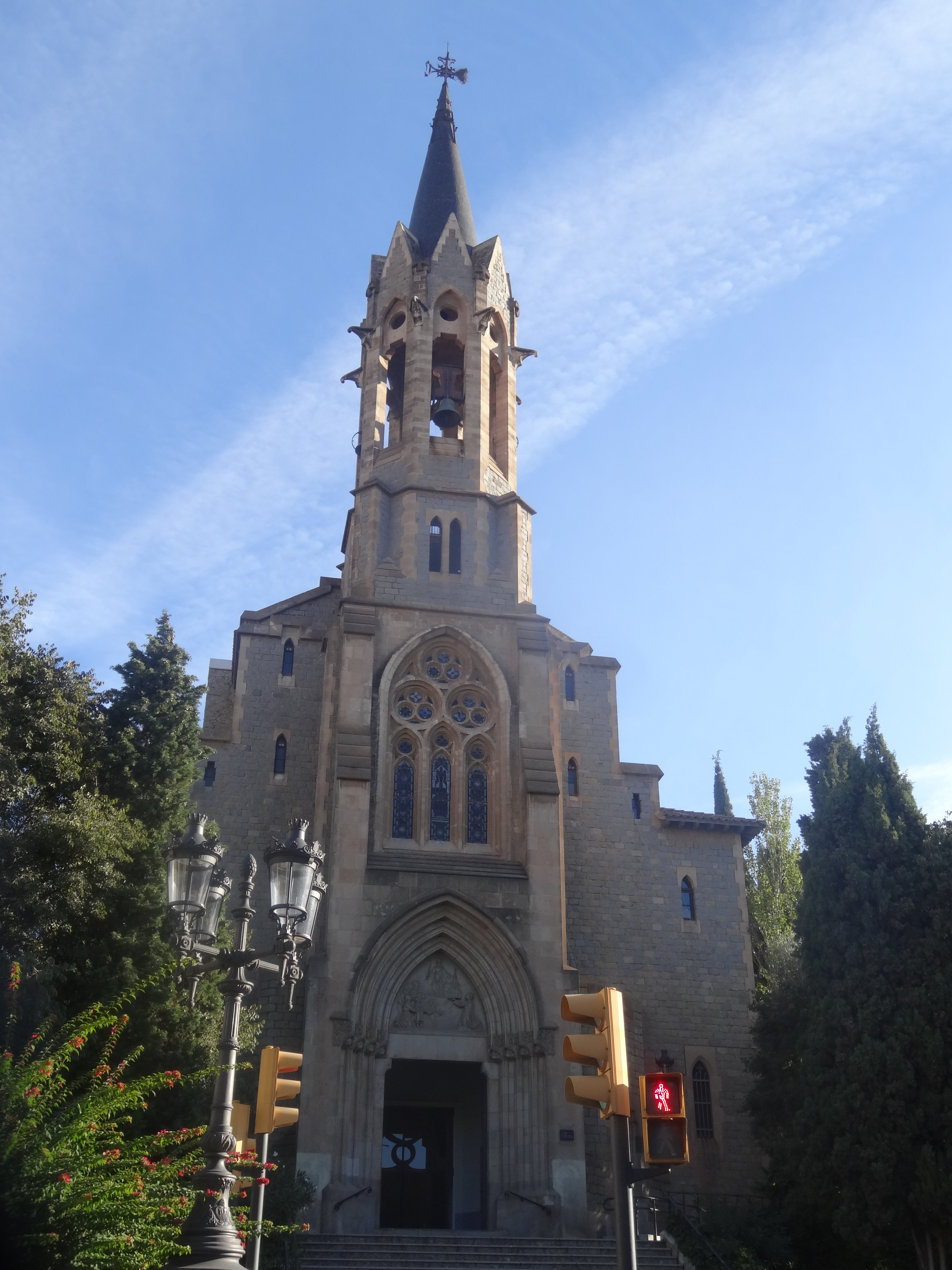
Església Major of Santa Coloma De Gramenet

The interior features a coffered ceiling that recalls the ceiling of the Santa Ágata chapel in Barcelona. It is a staggering of wooden beams that forms rectangular squares. The trace of the modernist movement is not lacking either, reflected in the combination of artificial stone and exposed brick and in the ornamentation carried by the two capitals – one lower and one upper – that support each column.

==== Architects and construction ====
The temple was designed and its works, in part, directed by Francesc d'Assís Berenguer i Mestres, a close collaborator of Gaudí, with whom he worked for twenty-seven years. As Berenguer did not have the title of architect, the project was signed by Miquel Pascual i Tintorer. It seems that he assumed the direction of the works when he died suddenly in Berenguer in 1914, at the age of forty-seven. The construction was supported by a legacy from Mn. Jaume Gordi.

An altarpiece that was in the Main Altar was destroyed in the first days of the civil war of 1936–1939. After having tried various solutions to address the absence of this altarpiece, a ceramic screen, that is still there today, the work of Ricardo Altés, was installed.

==== Stained glass ====
The windows in the upper part of the apse have been provided with seven stained glass windows. The three in the center were made by the cartoonist Pere Cánovas and the glazier Francisco Queixalós.

The one on the left reproduces the historical signs of the Colomense town during its long rural period (the Pallaresa Tower, the Balldovina Tower, the Puig Castellar, "the Old Church" and the most typical agricultural products from which the local peasantry lived). The middle one represents Santa Colona (Patroness) with her legendary emblems (the bear, fire and rain, the dove and the Bible). The one on the right shows the two most emblematic buildings of the current city (the Town Hall and the church of Santa Coloma).

In addition, the blue color that decorates the lower part of the two stained glass windows – "rural" and "urban" – evokes the river Besós present in all eras.

=== Image of the patron saint of the city, Santa Coloma Mártir ===
To the right of the Main Altar is the image of the patron saint of the city, Santa Coloma Mártir, original from the 15th century. Her face was damaged by a fire during July 1936 caused by the Republican side and, later, it was rebuilt with a slightly different appearance than it had previously.

=== Rectory ===
Next to the temple is the rectory in a Gothic style, adorned by a set of crenelated windows.

=== Sant Josep Oriol Parish ===
The current church of Sant Josep Oriol occupies the same site as the original 11th century Romanesque church, replaced in 1761 by a new Baroque temple, which was destroyed in 1936. Of the current building, the most remarkable element is the presbytery, decorated by the artist Grau Garriga, and which is presided over by an impressive cotton tapestry in the shape of the Esquix lamb, which symbolizes Jesus Christ.

=== Puig Castellar ===
The Iberian town is located at the top of Puig Castellar, 303 m high. It is the remains of a village of a Laietana tribe, founded in the 6th century BC. C. and that lasted until the 3rd centuries BC. C. or II a. C, precisely with the arrival of the Romans in the lands.

The town was medium in size, basically dedicated to agriculture and livestock, although traces found confirm commercial activity with foreign civilizations such as the Greek or Carthaginian. The structure of the town is elliptical, with three longitudinal streets and an area of about 4000 m², which is estimated to be about thirty buildings and a population of about 200 inhabitants. For its defense and security, the town was surrounded by a wall.

The town was discovered in 1902 by Ferran de Sagarra, who carried out the first excavations and finds, ceded to the Institute of Catalan Studies. The work was continued by Serra-Ràfols and later by the Puig Castellar hiking center. Currently most of the objects discovered are in the Torre Balldovina Museum.

To recover the historical heritage, since 2007 the Iberian Festival has been celebrated in the city. Among the activities, stand out the representations of the daily life of the Iberians.

== Notable people ==
- Laia Aleixandri (born 2000), footballer for Barcelona and the Spain national team

== Sources ==
Panareda Clopés, Josep Maria; Rios Calvet, Jaume; Rabella Vives, Josep Maria (1989). Guia de Catalunya, Barcelona: Caixa de Catalunya. ISBN 84-87135-01-3 (Spanish). ISBN 84-87135-02-1 (Catalan).
