= Can Zam station =

Metro station in Barcelona, Spain

Coordinates: 41°27′27″N 2°11′54″E

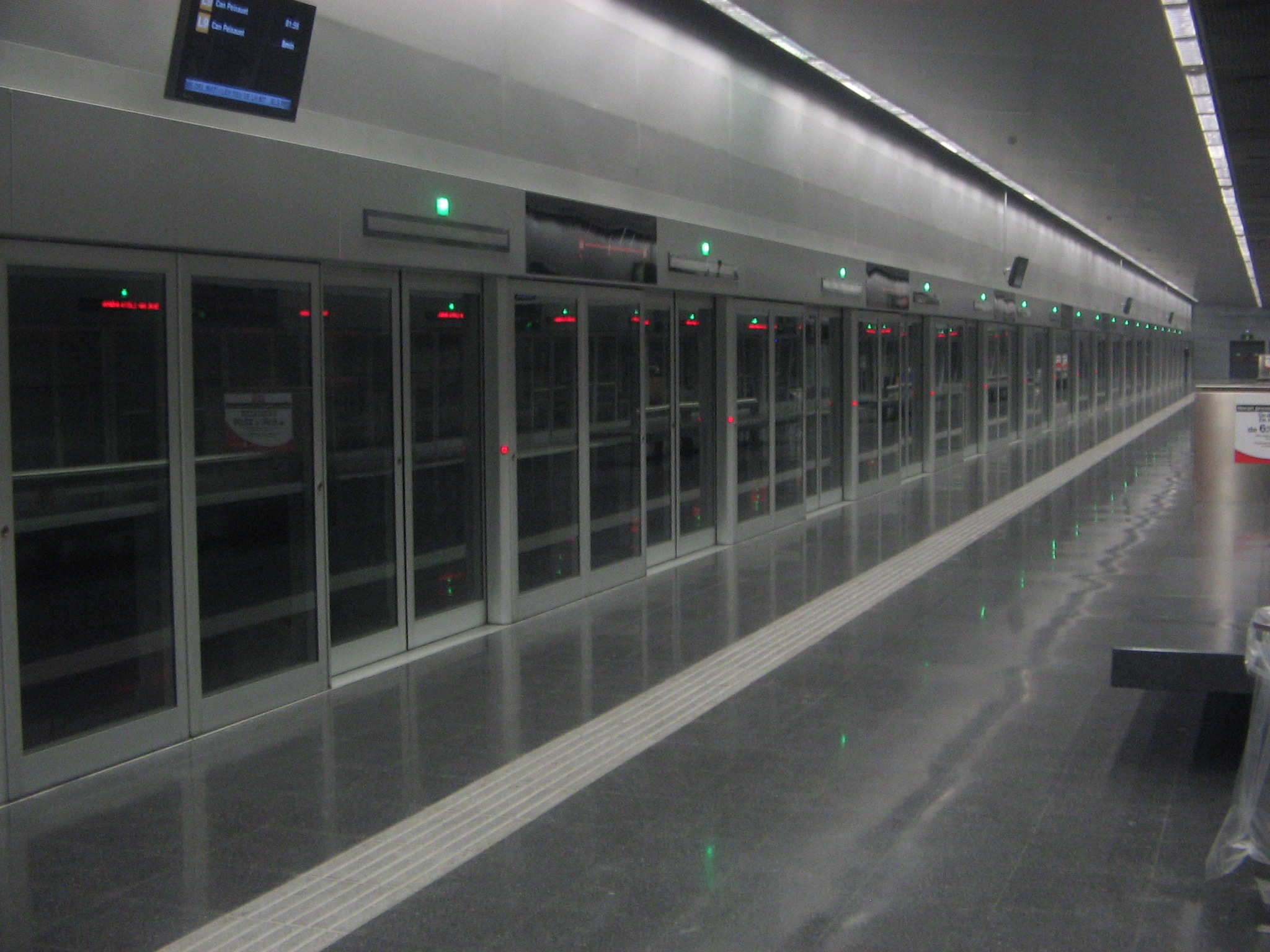
Can Zam station platform

Can Zam (Catalan pronunciation: [ˈkan ˈzam]) is a Barcelona Metro station in the municipality of Santa Coloma de Gramenet, in the northern part of the metropolitan area of Barcelona. The station is located at the intersection of Avinguda Francesc Macià and Carrer Balmes. It's served by L9, the first part of line 9 to be opened, between Can Zam and Can Peixauet, both in Santa Coloma. Its inauguration took place on 13 December 2009.

== Services ==
| Preceding station | Metro | Following station |
|---|---|---|
| Singuerlín towards La Sagrera | L9 Nord | Terminus |
Projected
| Singuerlín towards Airport T1 | L9 | Terminus |

== See also ==
- List of Barcelona Metro stations
