= Camp Nou =

Football stadium in Barcelona, Catalonia, Spain

Coordinates: 41°22′51″N 2°07′22″E

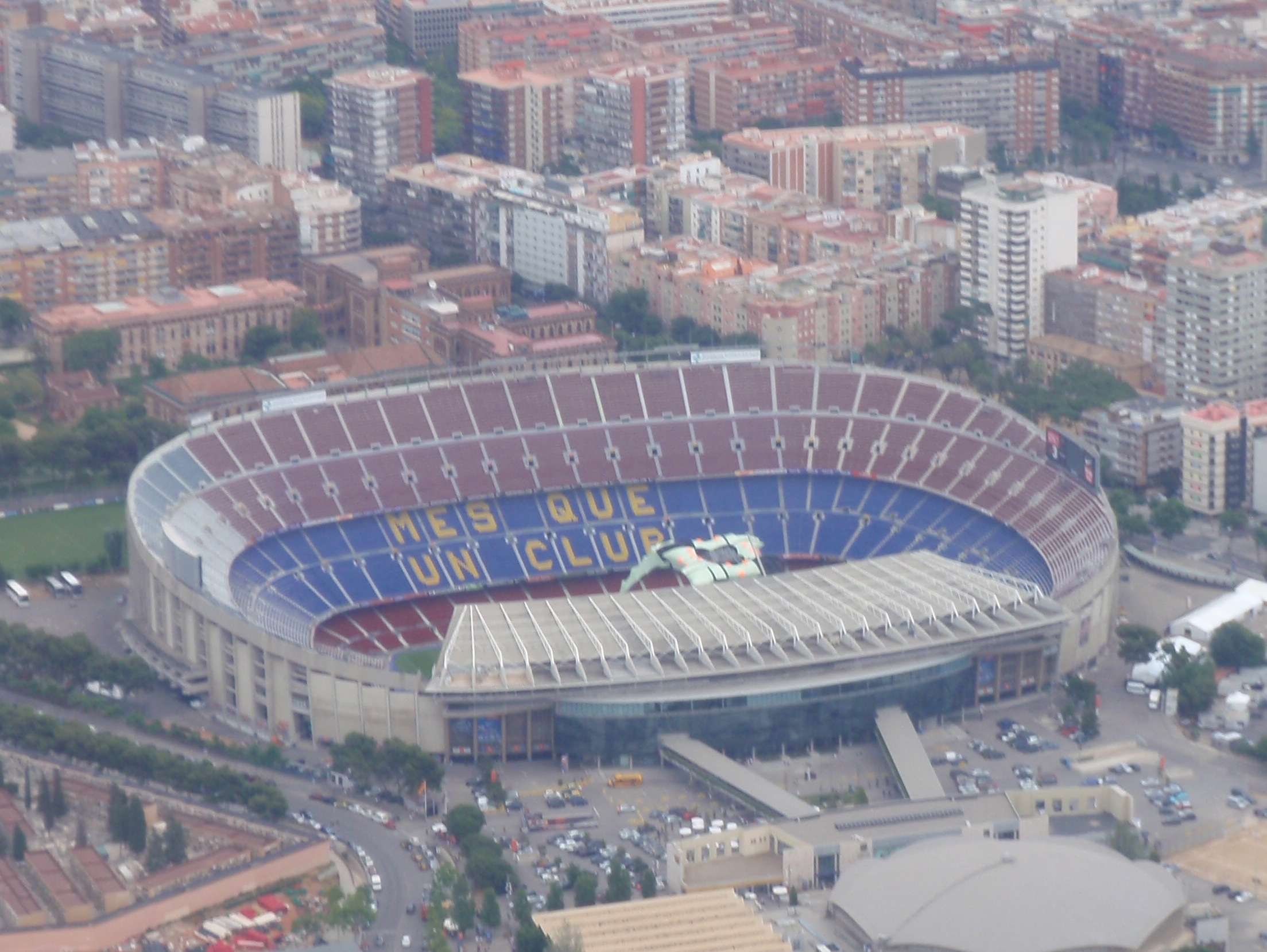
- UEFA
- Interactive map of Camp Nou
- Full name: Spotify Camp Nou
- Former names: Estadio del Club de Fútbol Barcelona (1957–1973); Estadi del Futbol Club Barcelona (1973–2001)
- Location: Barcelona, Catalonia, Spain
- Owner: Barcelona
- Capacity: 62,652 (current); 105,000 (expected)
- Executive suites: 23
- Surface: GrassMaster hybrid grass (5% synthetic fibres, 95% natural grass)
- Scoreboard: Sony
- Record attendance: 120,000 (Barcelona vs Juventus, 5 March 1986)
- Field size: 105 m × 68 m (115 yd × 74 yd)
- Public transit: at Palau Reial or Les Corts; at Collblanc; at Av. de Xile

Construction
- Built: 1954–1957
- Opened: 24 September 1957; 69 years ago
- Renovated: 1982, 1993–1994, 2023–present
- Expanded: 1982, 2023–present
- Cost: €2 billion
- Architects: Francesc Mitjans and Josep Soteras

Tenants
- Barcelona (1957–2023, 2025–present); Catalonia national team (selected matches); Barcelona Women (selected matches)

Website
- Spotify Camp Nou

Camp Nou (Catalan: [ˈkam ˈnɔw], meaning 'New Field'), officially Spotify Camp Nou for sponsorship reasons, and often referred to in English as the Nou Camp, is a stadium in Barcelona and the home of La Liga club FC Barcelona since its opening in 1957. It is currently undergoing renovation, and with a planned increased seating capacity of 105,000 it will retain its position as the largest stadium in terms of seating capacity in Spain and Europe, as well as the second largest association football stadium, while becoming the fifth-largest overall stadium in the world.

Camp Nou has hosted two European Cup/Champions League finals in 1989 and 1999, two European Cup Winners' Cup finals, four Inter-Cities Fairs Cup final games, five UEFA Super Cup games, four Copa del Rey finals, two Copa de la Liga finals, and twenty-one Supercopa de España finals. It also hosted five matches in the 1982 FIFA World Cup (including the opening game), half of the four matches at the 1964 European Nations' Cup, and the football tournament's final at the 1992 Summer Olympics.

Renovation of the stadium began on 1 June 2023. Barcelona played its home matches at the Estadi Olímpic Lluís Companys during the 2023–24 and 2024–25 seasons, and briefly at both the Olympic Stadium and the Johan Cruyff Stadium during the 2025–26 season. Camp Nou reopened for competitive matches in November 2025 at a reduced capacity. The renovation is expected to be completed ahead of the 2028–29 season.

== Construction ==
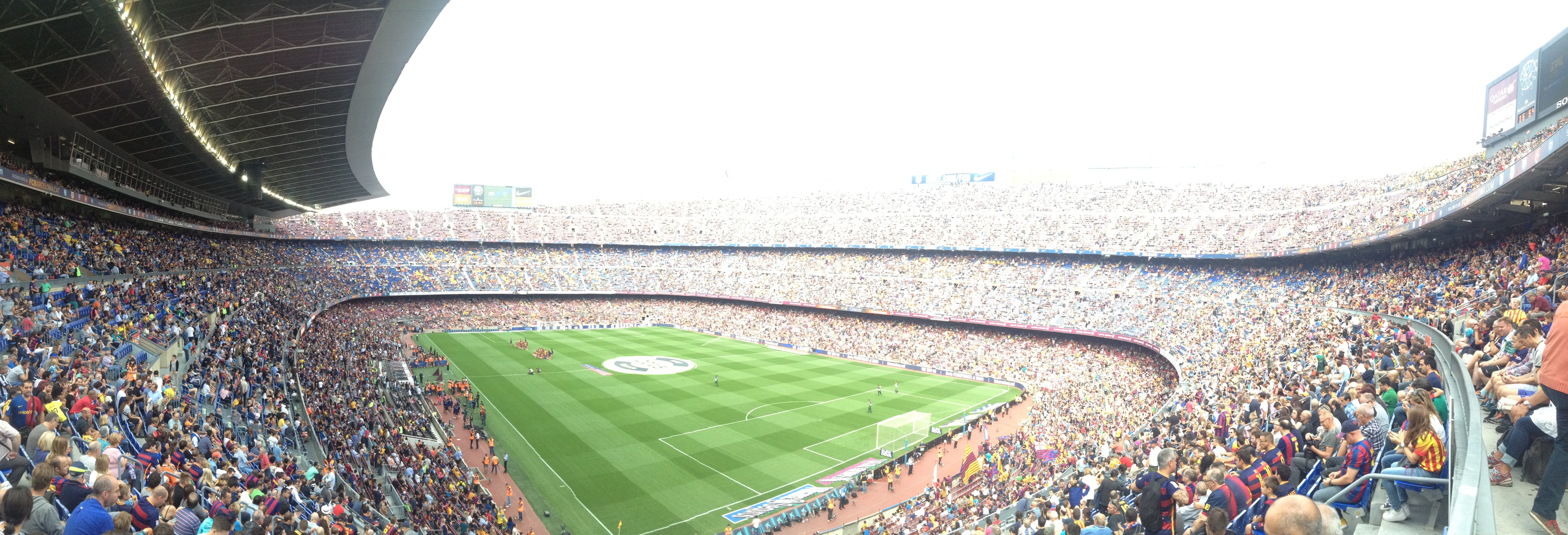
A home game at Camp Nou.

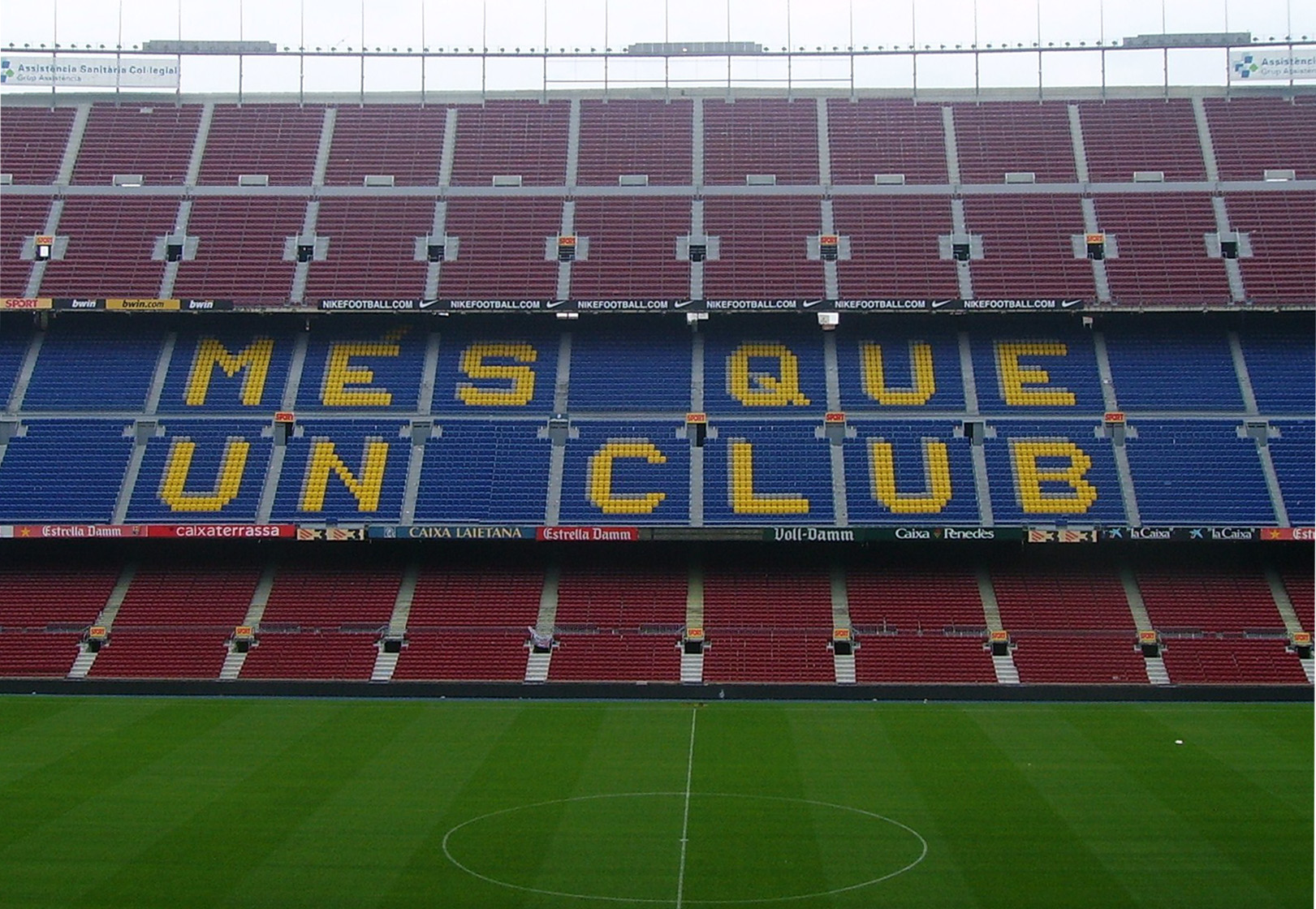
One of the stands displaying Barcelona's motto, Més que un club, meaning "More than a club"

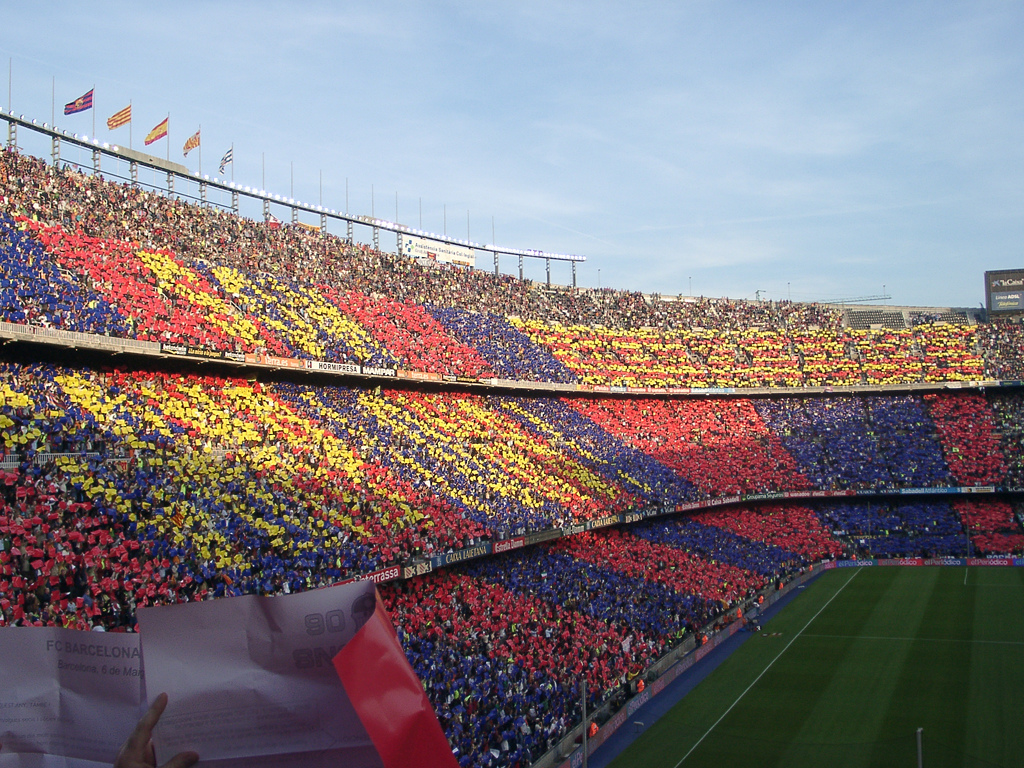
A view of the supporters' side during a match, showing the FC Barcelona colours

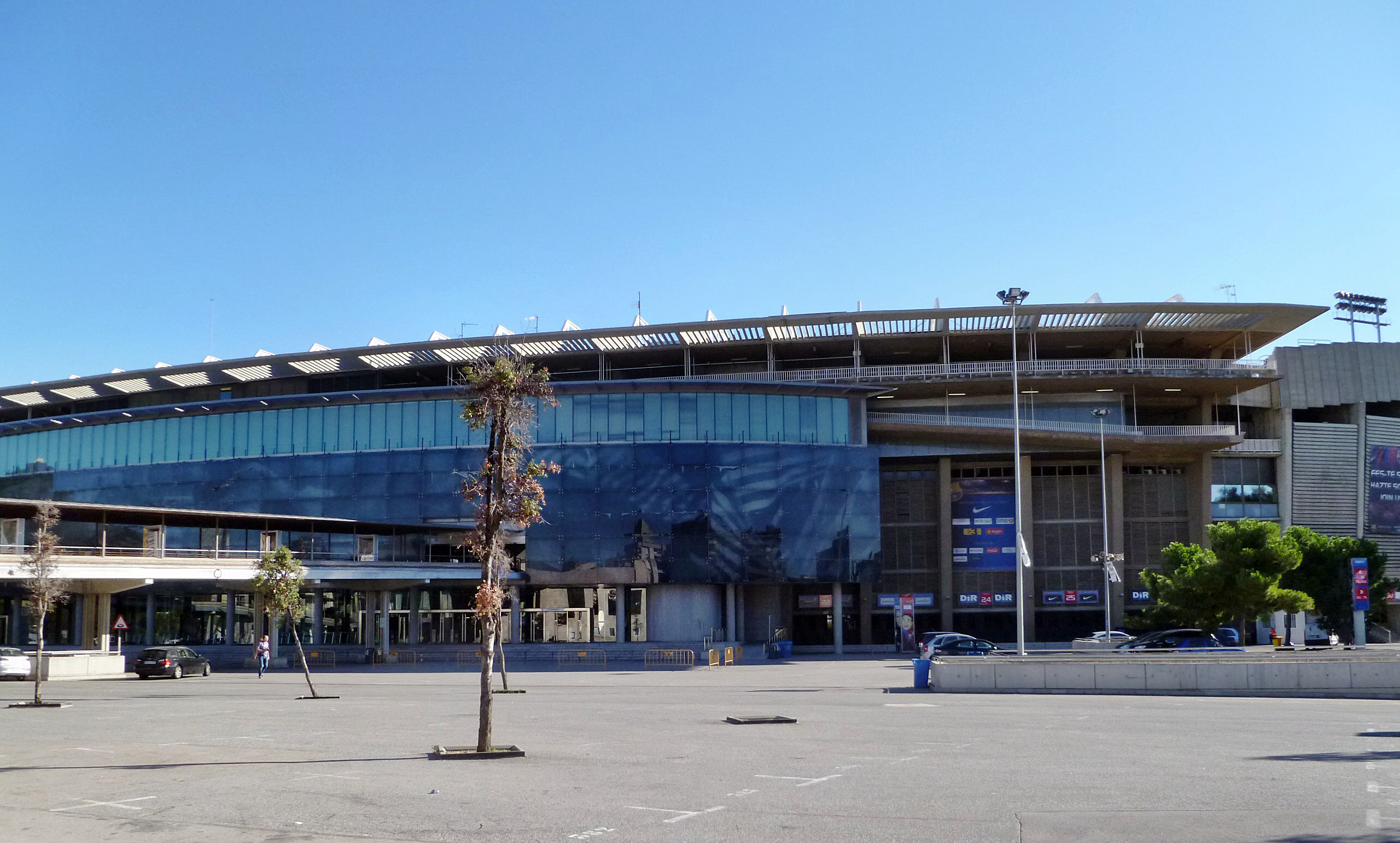
Main stand external view of the stadium

The construction of the Camp Nou started on 28 March 1954 as Barcelona's previous stadium, Camp de Les Corts, had no room for expansion. The June 1950 signing of László Kubala, regarded as one of Barcelona's greatest players, provided further impetus to the construction of a larger stadium.

On 14 November 1950, the president Agustí Montal Galobart obtained the favourable agreement of an assembly of members to acquire land for the construction of a new stadium, located in L'Hospitalet de Llobregat, which was later exchanged with the City Council of Barcelona for other land in the neighbourhood of Les Corts. The stadium is located at the end of Travessera de les Corts, next to the Cementiri and the Maternitat. The commission dedicated to the project recommended another location in February 1951. The official purchase took place two years later.

The appointment of Francesc Miró-Sans as president of Barcelona, on 14 November 1953, was to relaunch the project. Invested in February of the following year, Miró-Sans decided in favour of the land acquired in 1950, and the first stone of the stadium was laid on 28 March 1954. A procession of several thousands of people made the journey from the Camp de Les Corts to La Masia de Can Planes, where the ceremony of laying the first stone was held, a solemn ceremony in the presence of Miró-Sans, the head of the Civil Government of Barcelona and the archbishop of Barcelona, Gregorio Modrego.

The project was completed one year later, when the club entrusted the construction to the building company Ingar SA. The work was supposed to last eight months, but the costs were more than four times higher than expected, reaching 288 million pesetas. Through mortgages and loans, the club managed to finish the project, borrowing heavily for several years. The club hoped to cover the cost with the sale of the land at Les Corts, but the City Council of Barcelona took five years to requalify it, giving rise to a period of certain economic hardship, Finally, the head of state and of the Spanish government at the time, the dictator Francisco Franco, authorised the requalification of the land at Les Corts. During the course of the Camp Nou construction work, La Masia served as a workshop for making the models and a workplace for architects and builders.

The architects were Francesc Mitjans and Josep Soteras, with the collaboration of Lorenzo García-Barbón.

Finally, on 24 September 1957, the feast of La Mercè, the Camp Nou was inaugurated. A solemn mass presided over by the archbishop, who welcomed the finished stadium, preceded the Hallelujah from Handel's Messiah. Dignitaries of the Franco regime and of the city gathered in the presidential tribune, and some 90,000 people attended the opening ceremony in the stands of the huge stadium. During the event, football clubs from all over Catalonia paraded on the field, as well as members of the different sections of Barça, the penyes and the different Barcelona teams.

Like the Santiago Bernabéu of Real Madrid, the stadium was inspired by De Kuip, home of Feyenoord, which was built in 1937, and featured oval rings around the pitch, resulting in continuous stands without open corners.

== Name ==
After members approved a new stadium in 1950, it was widely expected to be named after the club's founder, Joan Gamper, and the name was used informally while the ground was still a project, including by president Francesc Miró-Sans. The Francoist authorities rejected it. Gamper's suicide has often been cited as the reason, though his profile as a foreign-born Catalan nationalist, liberal and Protestant is thought to have weighed more heavily, as it was at odds with the ideology of the Franco regime. General José Moscardó wrote to Miró-Sans telling him to drop the idea, and the name never appeared in an official document.

As a result, the stadium had no official name when it opened in 1957. It was referred to by the purely descriptive "Estadio del Club de Fútbol Barcelona", while supporters used the popular Catalan name Camp Nou ("New Field"), as it replaced Camp de Les Corts. In 1965, president Enric Llaudet put the official name to a members' vote. The descriptive name won with 12,434 votes, ahead of "Estadio Barça" (10,484) and "Estadio Camp Nou" (8,394) and several other names, but Camp Nou remained the name in everyday use.

In November 1973, the club was allowed to use its Catalan name "Futbol Club Barcelona" again, having been forced to use the Spanish "Club de Fútbol Barcelona" since 1941 as part of the regime's suppression of the Catalan language. The stadium's official name was therefore changed to the Catalan "Estadi del Futbol Club Barcelona".

In July 2001, another vote under president Joan Gaspart made "Camp Nou" the official name, with 68.25% in favour and 29.64% against.

In April 2020, the club transferred the stadium's naming rights to its foundation to find a sponsor for the 2020–21 season, with proceeds going to COVID-19 research. However, the plan did not materialise. In 2022, the club sold the naming rights to Spotify in a deal reported to be worth $310 million, running until June 2026, and the stadium became Spotify Camp Nou in July 2022. In October 2025, the club and Spotify extended their sponsorship agreement through 2030, with the naming rights secured until 2034.

== History ==
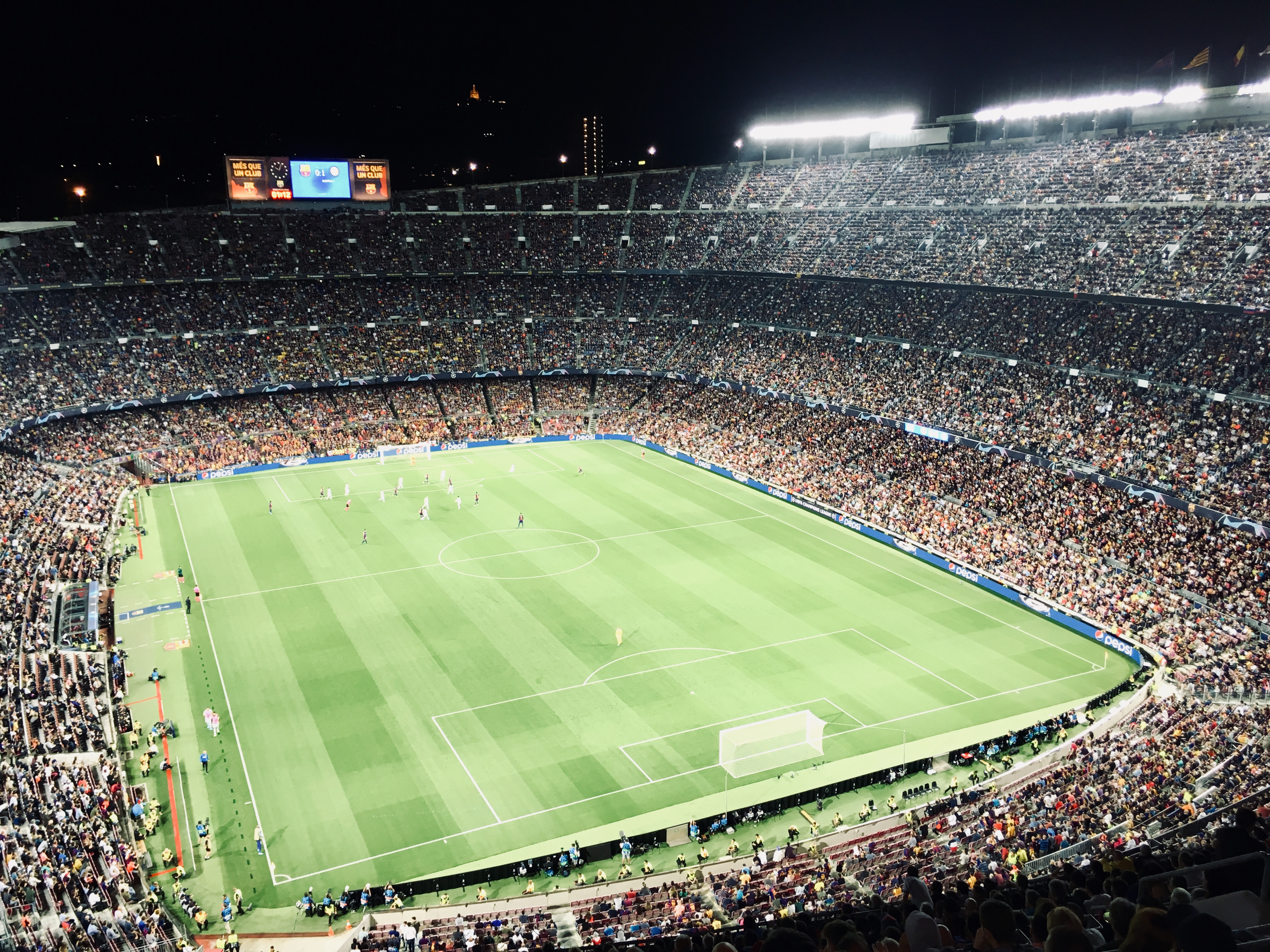
Interior of the stadium with its then capacity of 99,354 during a UEFA Champions League game between Barcelona and Inter Milan in 2019

The stadium's capacity has varied greatly over the years, opening at 106,146, and growing to 121,401 for the 1982 FIFA World Cup. In May 1972, the Camp Nou hosted its first European Cup Winners' Cup final between Rangers and Dynamo Moscow. Rangers won the match with a score of 3–2. Electronic scoreboards were installed in 1975.

The stadium underwent an expansion in 1982, in anticipation of the 1982 FIFA World Cup, which added boxes, VIP lounges, a new press area, new markers and the construction of the third tier, which was smaller in height than the original design by 6 metres (46.60 metres compared to the original design of 52.50 metres). The expansion of the stadium added 22,150 new seats, taking the total seating capacity to 71,731, and the standing capacity was expanded by 16,500 to 49,670, taking the total stadium capacity (seated and standing combined) to 121,401. Barcelona's record attendance was set on 5 March 1986 in the European Cup quarter-final against Juventus in front of 120,000 spectators, just 1,401 shy of the stadium's capacity.

The Camp Nou was one of several stadiums used throughout the 1982 World Cup, hosting the inauguration ceremony on 13 June. It also hosted more matches in that tournament than any of the 16 other stadiums used all over Spain, including the opening match, where the traditional opening ceremonies took place (including the releasing of a dove). In front of 95,000, Belgium upset the defending champions Argentina 1–0 in that opening match. It then hosted three round-robin matches between the Soviet Union, Poland and Belgium, which Poland ended up winning and qualifying from to reach the semi-finals, where they played Italy at the Camp Nou, losing 2–0; Italy went on to win the final match, which was played at the Santiago Bernabéu in Madrid.

The Camp Nou also hosted the 1999 UEFA Champions League Final between Manchester United and Bayern Munich, with both teams in contention to complete league title/domestic cup/European Cup trebles. Bayern led early through Mario Basler's goal in the sixth minute and kept the lead as the clock reached 90 minutes, but United came back to win with injury time goals from Teddy Sheringham and Ole Gunnar Solskjær.

As well as hosting Barcelona, the Camp Nou is home to the Catalan team. The stadium is frequently used for other football events. The European Cup final between Milan and Steaua București was held on 24 May 1989, with the Italian club winning 4–0. The Camp Nou hosted part of the football competition, including the final, in the 1992 Summer Olympics. In preparation for these matches, two additional tiers of seating were installed over the previous roof-line.

The Camp Nou opened the Barcelona club museum in 1984. The stadium was renovated in 1993–94, in which the pitch was lowered by 2.5 metres (8 feet), the security gap that separated the lawn from the galleries was removed, and standing room was eliminated in favour of individual seating. A new press box, renovation of the presidential grandstand and boxes, new parking under the main grandstand and new lighting and sound systems were completed in time for the 1998–99 season. During 1998–99, UEFA rated the Camp Nou a five-star stadium for its services and functionalities.

The facilities now include a memorabilia shop, mini-pitches for training matches and a chapel for the players. The stadium also houses the second-most visited museum in Catalonia, the Barcelona Museum, which receives more than 1.2 million visitors per year.

On 1 October 2017, Barcelona's league match against Las Palmas was played in an empty Camp Nou due to political turmoil in the region.

On 15 September 2026, the stadium was selected to host the 2029 UEFA Champions League final.

== Renovation and expansion ==
=== Barça 2000 ===
In 1996, during the 19th Congress of the International Union of Architects in Barcelona, an international ideas competition was held to redevelop the area around Camp Nou. Enric Batlle and Joan Roig won the competition, and the club subsequently commissioned them to develop their proposal. In 1997, president Josep Lluís Núñez developed the proposal into the Barça 2000 project, which aimed to generate additional revenue from land around the stadium while creating new public spaces and facilities. A separate company was created to develop the project. In 1998, Núñez and Barcelona mayor Joan Clos agreed to advance the project, with an estimated investment of around 40 billion pesetas.

The project faced opposition from residents of Les Corts, who criticised its scale and expected impact on traffic and the neighbourhood. In 1999, 23 architects also called for its withdrawal and the restoration of the original competition proposal. In 2000, Barcelona City Council required the project to be subject to a master plan for the area, which delayed it. After Núñez left the presidency, Joan Gaspart froze the project and adapted the club's plans to municipal regulations. The project was ultimately abandoned.

=== Foster project ===
In 2003, following the election of Joan Laporta as president, the club's new board proposed remodelling the Camp Nou. In 2005, Laporta revived plans to redevelop the stadium and surrounding area, including the Mini Estadi site and facilities on Montjuïc. During the 2006–07 season, the club launched an international architectural competition to remodel the stadium ahead of its fiftieth anniversary, receiving 79 formal expressions of interest and selecting ten firms for the second stage. On 18 September 2007, the British architect Norman Foster and his company were selected to "restructure" the Camp Nou. The plan included the addition of roughly 6,000 seats, bringing the stadium's capacity to 105,000, at an estimated cost of €250 million. The Barcelona board approved the sale of the Mini Estadi, the club's former training ground, to finance the remodelling, despite significant opposition. The project was planned to begin in 2009 and to be finished for the 2011–12 season. However, due to the 2008 financial crisis, the sale of the training ground was postponed, delaying the remodelling. In May 2010, Sandro Rosell, then a candidate for president, dismissed the possibility of selling the Mini Estadi, saying it would be indefensible to "sell the crown jewels". His election on 30 June 2010 effectively ended the plan.

=== Espai Barça ===
After taking office in 2010, Sandro Rosell considered alternatives to the Foster project. In 2012, Barcelona studied building a new 110,000-seat stadium near Avinguda Diagonal, potentially on University of Barcelona land. In 2013, the club narrowed the options to either a major renovation of Camp Nou, estimated to cost more than €300 million, or a new stadium elsewhere, estimated at €600 million. In January 2014, Barcelona's board of directors rejected the option of building a new stadium due to financial constraints and instead approved the Espai Barça project, which included a remodelled Camp Nou with a capacity of 105,000. The project was approved by a club referendum in April 2014. Josep Maria Bartomeu, who succeeded Rosell as president in January 2014, continued the project during his presidency. The project was initially expected to cost around €600 million and run from 2017 to early 2021, making it one of the most expensive stadium expansions on a per-seat basis. A refined design released in May 2015 included a canopy over the stands and more detailed plans for the expansion. In March 2016, the Japanese firm Nikken Sekkei, together with Pascual i Ausió Arquitectes, won the international architectural competition to design the redeveloped Camp Nou. In July 2018, Barcelona appointed Goldman Sachs to help structure the financing of Espai Barça. In 2019, the Mini Estadi was demolished, with 80% of its materials planned to be recycled. Construction of the renovated Camp Nou was scheduled to begin in summer 2020 and be completed in 2024. By October 2020, the cost had risen to €725 million, plus €90 million in financing costs, to be repaid over 25 years from the project's additional revenues.

In October 2021, after Joan Laporta returned as president, the assembly of delegate members approved up to €1.5 billion in financing for the project. The proposal was subsequently approved by the club's members in a referendum in December. On 28 April 2022, the club confirmed that renovation work would begin after the 2022–23 season. Under the initial schedule, Barcelona would move to the Estadi Olímpic Lluís Companys in Montjuïc for the 2023–24 season, return to Camp Nou the following season with approximately half the stadium available, and complete the renovation during 2026. In early 2023, Barcelona formally appointed Turkey-based Limak Holding as the main contractor for the renovation, while Nikken Sekkei was retained as the project's "Design Guardian" to ensure continuity of the original design during construction. Renovation work on the stadium began on 1 June 2023. Barcelona subsequently played its home matches at the Olympic Stadium throughout the following two seasons. Delays to the renovation prevented the planned return to Camp Nou at the start of the 2025–26 season, and Barcelona instead played their first seven home matches, alternating between Estadi Johan Cruyff and the Olympic Stadium.

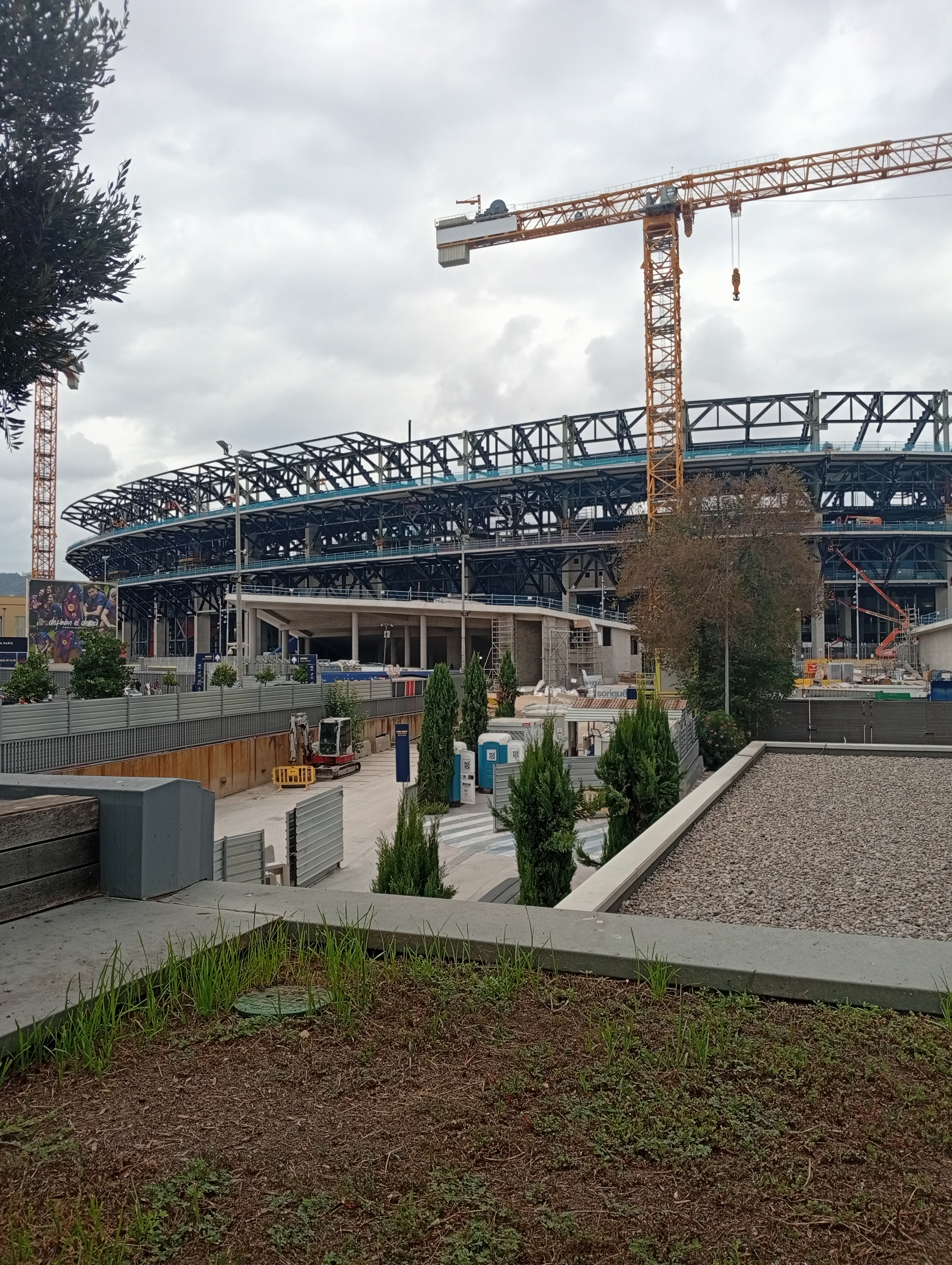
The stadium under renovation in September 2025

On 17 October 2025, Barcelona received the first occupancy licence for the stadium's Phase 1A, covering the Main Stand (Tribuna) and South Goal (Gol Sud), with a capacity of 25,991 spectators. However, the club chose not to return to the stadium for competitive matches until Phase 1B, covering the Lateral Stand, had also been approved. On 7 November, the club held an open training session at the stadium in front of 21,795 fans as part of the operational testing ahead of its return to competition. On 17 November, Barcelona announced that it had received the occupancy licence for Phase 1B, increasing the available capacity to 45,401 spectators. Barcelona returned to the stadium for its league fixture against Athletic Bilbao on 22 November, defeating them 4–0 in front of 45,157 fans. On 10 March 2026, the club confirmed that it had received the occupancy licence for Phase 1C, allowing the available capacity to increase to 62,652 spectators, while two of the three tiers of the North Goal (Gol Nord) stand remained closed.

In September 2026, the club's assembly of delegate members approved a further €510 million in financing, including €300 million to complete the Camp Nou and €210 million in media-backed financing to cover the financial impact of delays. The estimated cost of the Camp Nou redevelopment had risen to around €2 billion. The renovation is expected to continue beyond 2027. Barcelona plan to temporarily return to the Olympic Stadium at the start of the 2027–28 season while the stadium roof is installed. The club expects to return to Camp Nou in January 2028 with a capacity of approximately 95,000, and the stadium is expected to reach its planned capacity of 105,000 ahead of the 2028–29 season.

== Other uses ==
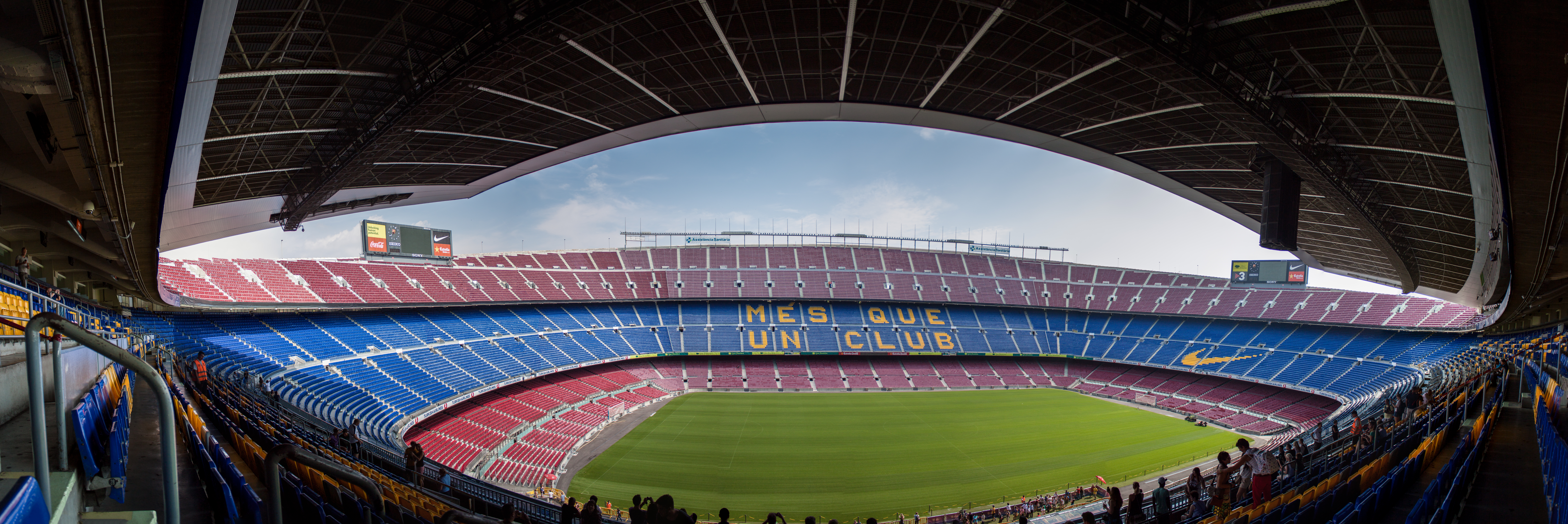
A panoramic photograph of the stadium

Camp Nou has been used for various purposes other than football, often hosting major concerts. Some notable high-profile appearances include:

- Pope John Paul II celebrated Mass for a congregation of over 121,500 at the Camp Nou on 17 November 1982, on the occasion of being made an honorary citizen of Barcelona.
- Julio Iglesias appeared in concert here on 5 September 1983 and on 8 September 1988.
- Bruce Springsteen performed here on 3 August 1988 during his Tunnel of Love Express Tour in front of 90,000 fans. He was back on 19 and 20 July 2008 during his Magic Tour. He returned to the stadium on 16 May 2016 during The River Tour.
- On 9 August 1988, Michael Jackson appeared at the stadium in front of 95,000 fans during his Bad World Tour.
- On 10 September 1988, the Human Rights Now! charity concert organised by Amnesty International to support human rights featured, among others, Bruce Springsteen, Sting, Peter Gabriel, Youssou N'Dour, Tracy Chapman, and El Último de la Fila.

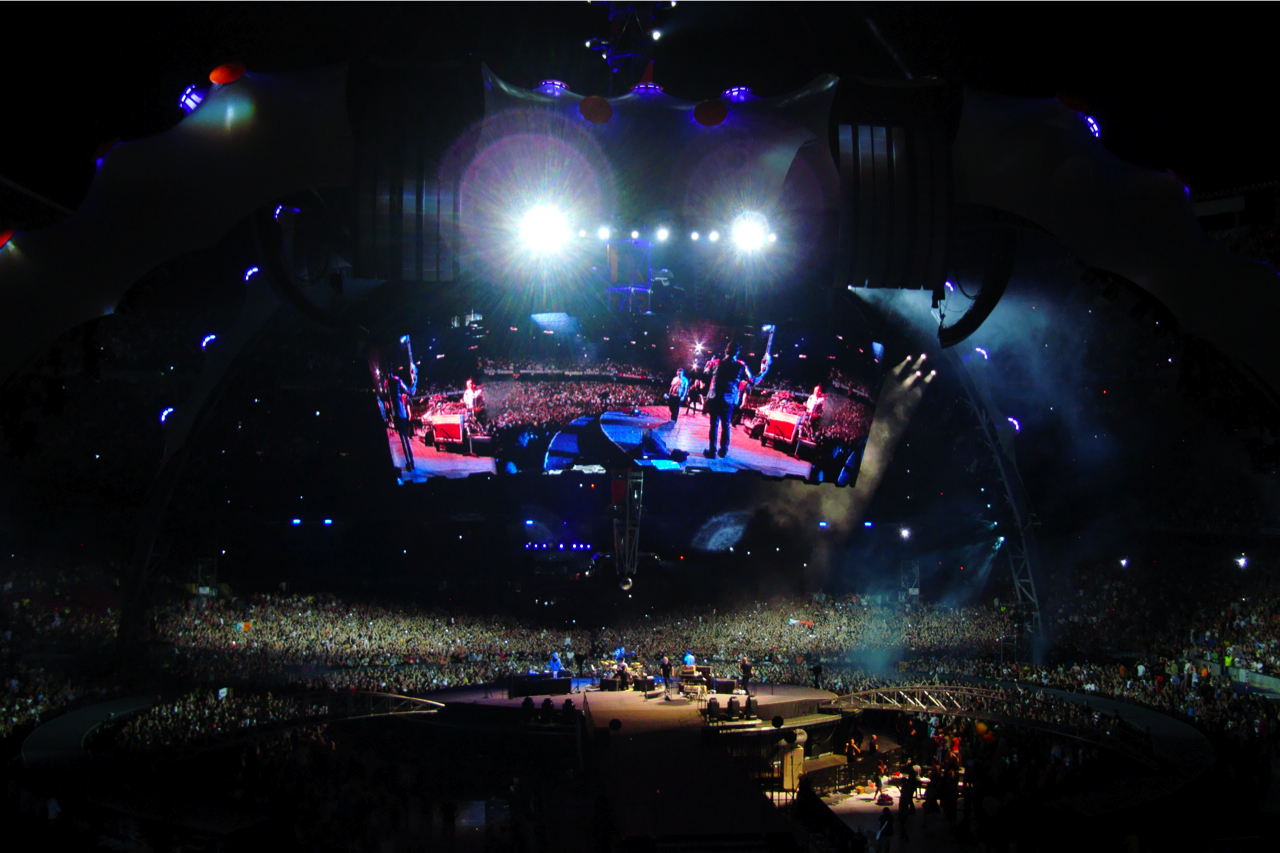
Camp Nou was host when U2 played in Barcelona on their 360° Tour.

- A concert by the Three Tenors – Josep Carreras, Plácido Domingo and Luciano Pavarotti – was held on 13 July 1997.
- U2 performed at the stadium three times: the first one was on 7 August 2005 during their Vertigo Tour, in front of a sold-out crowd of 81,269 people. The second and the third were on 30 June and 2 July 2009 during their U2 360° Tour, in front of a total crowd of 182,055 people. The encore performance of "I'll Go Crazy If I Don't Go Crazy Tonight" from the second 2009 show was filmed for the music video of the single.

On 4 November 2014, Ligue Nationale de Rugby (LNR), which operates France's professional rugby union leagues, announced that the 2015–16 Top 14 final would be held at the Camp Nou on 24 June 2016. The Top 14 final is traditionally held at the Stade de France in the Paris suburb of Saint-Denis. However, the scheduling of the 2015 Rugby World Cup caused the 2015–16 French season to be shifted by several weeks, in turn causing the Stade de France to be unavailable because it would be a major venue for UEFA Euro 2016. The match ultimately drew a crowd of 99,124, setting a new record for attendance at a domestic rugby union match.

On 18 May 2019, the first Super League game in Spain was hosted at the Camp Nou. The Catalans Dragons defeated the Wigan Warriors 33–16. This match set the Super League attendance record for a non-Magic Weekend, regular season fixture, attracting 31,555 fans.

In 2022, Barcelona had the largest known attendances for women's football since the 1971 Women's World Cup final, Mexico–Denmark (110,000), at the Azteca Stadium. Real Madrid and Wolfsburg were the visiting teams at Camp Nou in the Women's Champions League (91,553 and 91,648).

On 24 and 26 March 2023, the Camp Nou would host the inaugural Kings League Final Four. Kings League is a unique seven-a-side football format with quirks such as secret weapons and tie-breaker penalty shootouts. The event would generate controversy for forcing the women's Clásico between Barcelona and Real Madrid's women's teams to be played at the Johan Cruyff Stadium.

In October 2026, as part of the Spanish Rugby Federation bid, the Camp Nou was put forward as the preferred host for the final of the 2035 Rugby World Cup. If successful, it would be the first time the final would be held in front of more than 100,000 fans. The Federation also expressed interest in hosting the 2030 edition of the Top14 final at the stadium, having previously hosted the final in 2016.

== Transport connections ==
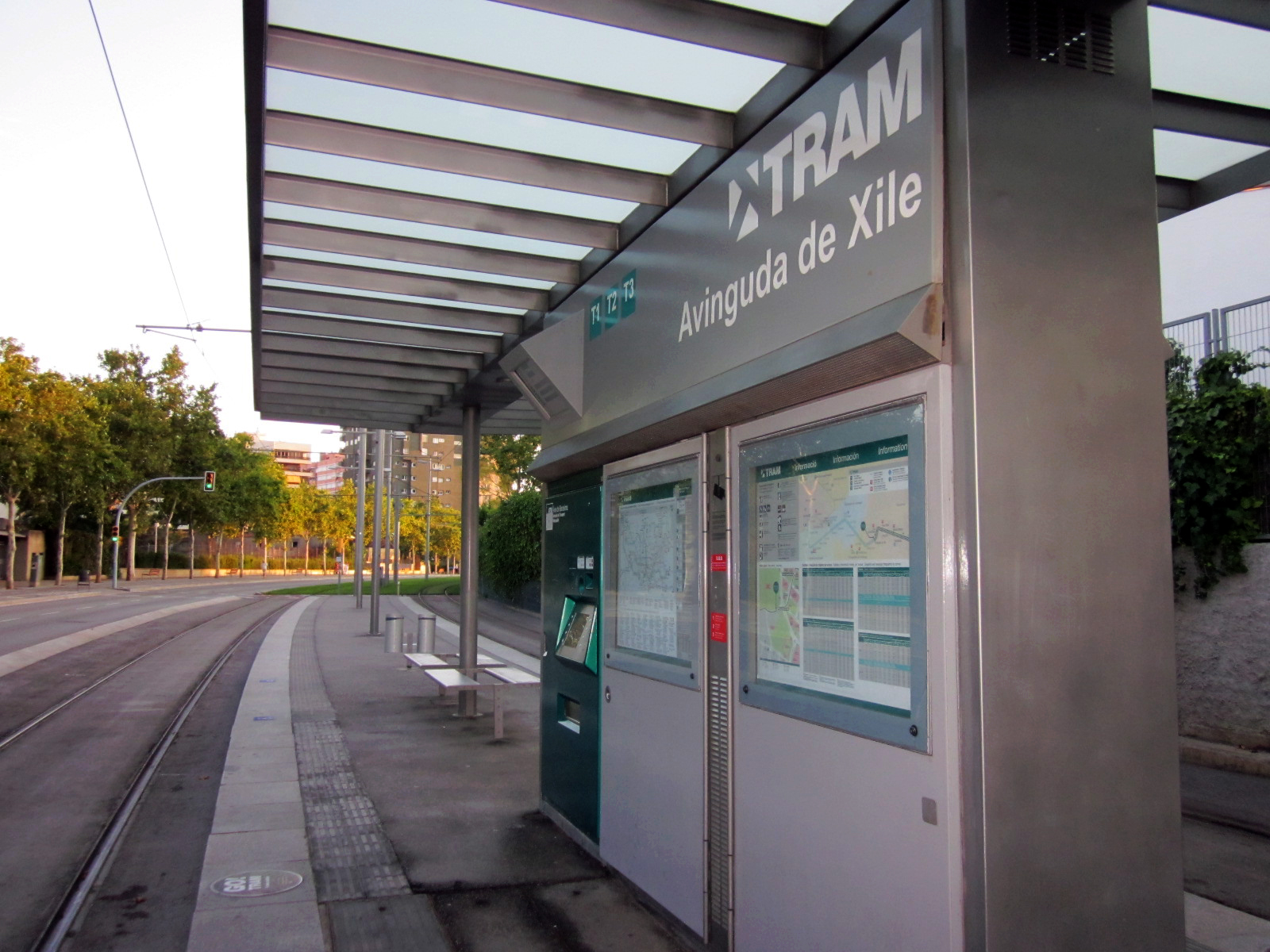
Avinguda de Xile Station

The stadium is accessible from the Barcelona Metro with the closest stations to the Camp Nou are Palau Reial, Maria Cristina and Les Corts, on L3; Badal on L5 and Collblanc on L5 or L9. All are 500 to 1,000 metres (0.31 to 0.62 miles) from Camp Nou, depending on which of the gates (accesses) to Camp Nou are used. Usually metro services are increased when there is a match, which causes significant passenger congestion.

A new station, named Avinguda de Xile / Camp Nou, is under construction and will be served by L9 and L10.

Approximately 680 metres (0.42 miles) from the Camp Nou there is the Trambaix Avinguda de Xile station (lines T1, T2 and T3).

The Camp Nou is also served by several TMB bus routes, an AMB line, and four Nitbus services. Apart from regular routes, there are two special lines to Mossèn Jacint Verdaguer Square and to Catalonia Square on days with matches.

The stadium is located 13.7 kilometres (8.5 mi) from the El Prat International Airport. It is connected by L9 from the airport directly to Collblanc, which is a short walk from the stadium.

== UEFA Champions League finals ==
UEFA Champions League finals
Season	Winners	Score	Runners-up	Attendance
1988–89	AC Milan (Italy)	4–0	(Romania) Steaua București	97,000
1998–99	Manchester United (England)	2–1	(Germany) Bayern Munich	90,245
2028–29		–		

== 1982 FIFA World Cup ==
The stadium was one of the 17 venues of the 1982 FIFA World Cup, and held the following matches:

Date	Team No. 1	Result	Team No. 2	Round	Attendance
13 June 1982	Argentina	0–1	Belgium	Group 3 (first round, opening match)	95,000
28 June 1982	Poland	3–0	Belgium	Group A (second round)	65,000
1 July 1982	Belgium	0–1	Soviet Union	Group A (second round)	45,000
4 July 1982	Soviet Union	0–0	Poland	Group A (second round)	65,000
8 July 1982	Poland	0–2	Italy	Semi-finals	50,000

== See also ==
- Lists of stadiums

== Bibliography ==
- Eaude, Michael (2008). Catalonia: a cultural history. Oxford University Press. ISBN 978-0-19-532797-7.
- Farred, Grant (2008). Long distance love: a passion for football. Temple University Press. ISBN 978-1-59213-374-1.
- Mussons i Mata, Josep (2003). El Barça vist per dins: pinzellades de la penúltima generació [Barça from the inside: Glimpses of the penultimate generation] (in Catalan). Pagès Editors. ISBN 978-84-9779-095-6. Archived from the original on 17 May 2021.
- Snyder, John (2001). Soccer's most wanted: the top 10 book of clumsy keepers, clever crosses, and outlandish oddities. Brassey's. ISBN 1-57488-365-8.

Events and tenants
Preceded by Two-legged final	Inter-Cities Fairs Cup; Final venue 1964	Succeeded by Stadio Comunale; Turin
Preceded by Karaiskakis Stadium; Athens	European Cup Winners' Cup; Final venue 1972	Succeeded by Kaftanzoglio Stadium; Thessaloniki
Preceded by Rheinstadion; Düsseldorf	European Cup Winners' Cup; Final venue 1982	Succeeded by Ullevi; Gothenburg
Preceded by Estadio Monumental; Buenos Aires	FIFA World Cup; Opening venue 1982	Succeeded by Estadio Azteca; Mexico City
Preceded by Neckarstadion; Stuttgart	European Cup; Final venue 1989	Succeeded by Praterstadion; Vienna
Preceded by Olympic Stadium; Seoul	Summer Olympics; Men's football final venue 1992	Succeeded by Sanford Stadium; Athens, Georgia
Preceded by Amsterdam Arena; Amsterdam	UEFA Champions League; Final venue 1999	Succeeded by Stade de France; Paris (Saint-Denis)
