= Les Corts station =

Metro station in Barcelona, Spain

Les Corts
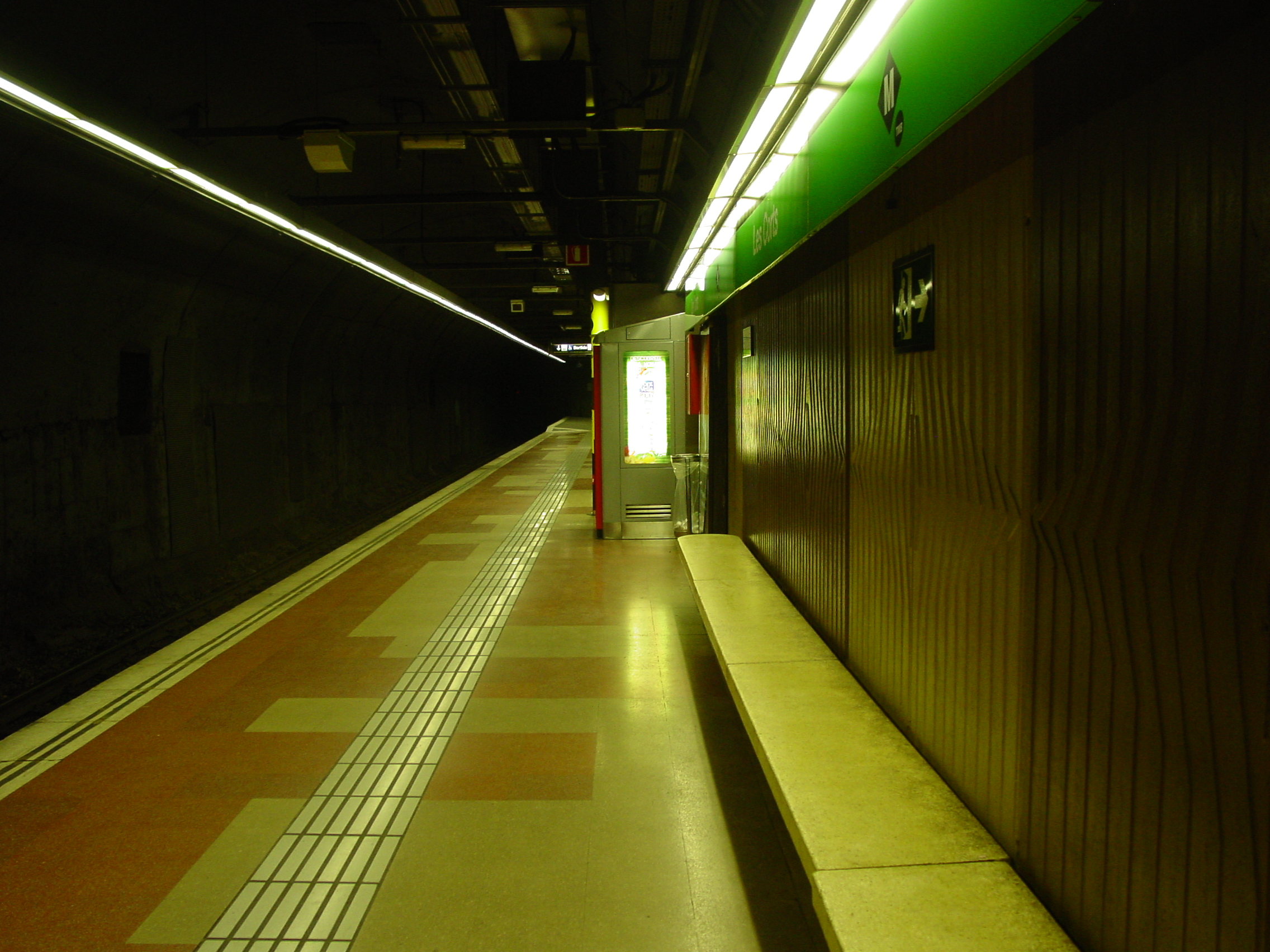
- Platform view of Les Corts station

General information
- Location: Barcelona (Les Corts)
- Coordinates: 41°23′2″N 2°7′51″E
- System: Barcelona Metro rapid transit station
- Operator: Transports Metropolitans de Barcelona

Other information
- Fare zone: 1 (ATM)

History
- Opened: 1975

Services
Preceding station	Metro	Following station
Maria Cristina towards Zona Universitària	L3	Plaça del Centre towards Trinitat Nova
Location
- Location within Barcelona Location within Spain

Les Corts (Catalan pronunciation: [ləs ˈkoɾts]) is a station in the Barcelona Metro network, in the Les Corts district of Barcelona, from which it takes its name. It is served by line L3.

The station is located under Carrer de Joan Güell, between Travessera de les Corts and Carrer de can Bruixa, and is some 800 metres (2,600 ft) from the Camp Nou, home of La Liga club FC Barcelona. The station has two 95-metre (312 ft) long side platforms.

The station opened in 1975, along with the other stations of the section of L3 between Zona Universitària and Sants Estació stations. This section was originally operated separately from L3, and known as L3b, until the two sections were joined in 1982.
