= La Caixa, Barcelona =

La Caixa
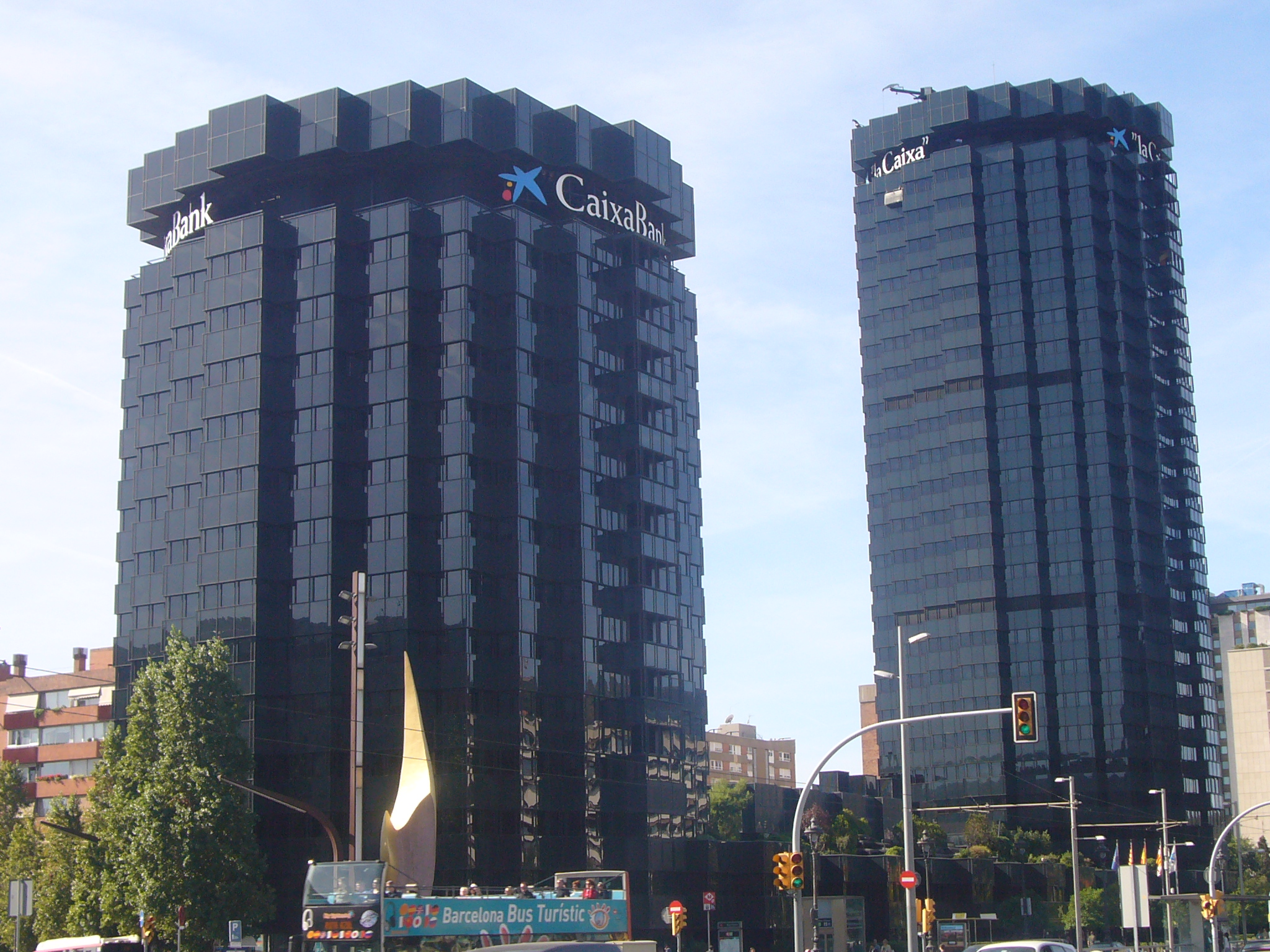
- La Caixa, towers 1 and 2 (on the right)
- Interactive map of the La Caixa area

General information
- Status: Completed
- Type: office
- Location: Barcelona, Spain
- Coordinates: 41°23′15″N 2°07′36″E
- Completed: 1974

Height
- Height: 85 m (279 ft) - La Caixa 1; 48 m (157 ft) - La Caixa 2

Technical details
- Floor count: 26 - La Caixa 1; 14 - La Caixa 2

La Caixa (La Caixa Headquarters) is a complex of three buildings, including a skyscraper in Barcelona, Spain. Completed in 1974. La Caixa 1 has 26 floors and rises 85 meters, La Caixa 2 has 14 floors and rises 48 meters. La Caixa 3 is not a tall building, and is in the form of a cube. The buildings are headquarters both of La Caixa foundation and of CaixaBank.

Maria Cristina station, on Barcelona Metro line L3, and Trambaix tram lines T1, T2 and T3, lies immediately in front of the headquarters complex.

== See also ==
- List of tallest buildings and structures in Barcelona
- Avinguda Diagonal
