= List of tram stops in the Barcelona metropolitan area =

This is a list of stops of the Trambaix, Trambesòs and Tramvia Blau tram services in Barcelona metropolitan area, alphabetically sorted:

== List ==
| Name | Tram routes | Other public transportation | Municipality | District |
|---|---|---|---|---|
| Adrià Margarit | Tramvia Blau | | Barcelona | Sarrià-Sant Gervasi |
| Alfons el Magnànim | T5 | | Barcelona | Sant Martí |
| Auditori-Teatre Nacional | T4 | | Barcelona | Sant Martí |
| Avinguda de Xile | T1, T2 | | Barcelona | Les Corts |
| Avinguda Tibidabo | Tramvia Blau | L7 | Barcelona | Sarrià-Sant Gervasi |
| Besòs | T5 | L4 | Barcelona | Sant Martí |
| Bon Viatge | T1, T2 | | Sant Joan Despí | |
| Bosch i Alsina | Tramvia Blau | | Barcelona | Sarrià-Sant Gervasi |
| Ca l'Aranyó | T4 | | Barcelona | Sant Martí |
| Can Clota | T1, T2, T3 | | Esplugues de Llobregat | |
| Can Jaumandreu | T5 | | Barcelona | Sant Martí |
| Can Llima | T4 | | Sant Adrià de Besòs | |
| Ca n'Oliveres | T1, T2, T3 | | Esplugues de Llobregat | |
| Can Rigal | T1, T2, T3 | | L'Hospitalet de Llobregat | District V |
| Carrer Número 15 | Tramvia Blau | | Barcelona | Sarrià-Sant Gervasi |
| Central Tèrmica del Besòs | T4 | | Sant Adrià de Besòs | |
| Centre Miquel Martí i Pol | T2 | | Sant Joan Despí | |
| Vila Olímpica | T4 | L4 | Barcelona | Sant Martí |
| Cornellà Centre | T1, T2 | L5, Rodalies Barcelona | Cornellà de Llobregat | |
| El Maresme | T4 | L4 | Barcelona | Sant Martí |
| El Pedró | T1, T2 | | Cornellà de Llobregat | |
| Encants de Sant Adrià | T5 | | Sant Adrià de Besòs | |
| Ernest Lluch | T1, T2, T3 | | L'Hospitalet de Llobregat | District V |
| Espronceda | T5 | | Barcelona | Sant Martí |
| Estació de Sant Adrià | T4 | Rodalies Barcelona | Sant Adrià de Besòs | |
| Fluvià | T4 | | Barcelona | Sant Martí |
| Font del Racó | Tramvia Blau | | Barcelona | Sarrià-Sant Gervasi |
| Fontsanta i Fatjó | T1, T2 | | Cornellà de Llobregat | |
| Fòrum | T4 | | Barcelona | Sant Martí |
| Francesc Macià | T1, T2, T3 | | Barcelona | Les Corts |
| Glòries | T4, T5 | L1 | Barcelona | Sant Martí |
| Gorg | T5 | L2, L10 | Badalona | |
| Hospital Sant Joan Despí - TV3 | T2, T3 | | Sant Joan Despí | |
| Ignasi Iglesias | T1, T2 | | Cornellà de Llobregat | |
| Josep Garí | Tramvia Blau | | Barcelona | Sarrià-Sant Gervasi |
| Josep Maria Florensa | Tramvia Blau | | Barcelona | Sarrià-Sant Gervasi |
| La Catalana | T5 | | Sant Adrià de Besòs | |
| La Farinera | T5 | | Barcelona | Sant Martí |
| La Fontsanta | T2 | Rodalies Barcelona | Sant Joan Despí | |
| La Mina | T6 | | Sant Adrià de Besòs | |
| La Sardana | T1, T2, T3 | | Esplugues de Llobregat | |
| Les Aigües | T1, T2 | | Cornellà de Llobregat | |
| L'Illa | T1, T2, T3 | | Barcelona | Les Corts |
| Lluís Muntadas | Tramvia Blau | | Barcelona | Sarrià-Sant Gervasi |
| Maria Cristina | T1, T2, T3 | L3 | Barcelona | Les Corts |
| Marina | T4 | L1 | Barcelona | Sant Martí |
| Montesa | T1, T2, T3 | | Esplugues de Llobregat | |
| Numància | T1, T2, T3 | | Barcelona | Les Corts |
| Palau Reial | T1, T2, T3 | L3 | Barcelona | Les Corts |
| Parc del Besòs | T5 | | Sant Adrià de Besòs | |
| Pere IV | T4 | | Barcelona | Sant Martí |
| Pius XII | T1, T2, T3 | | Barcelona | Les Corts |
| Plaça Dr. Andreu | Tramvia Blau | | Barcelona | Sarrià-Sant Gervasi |
| Pont d'Esplugues | T1, T2, T3 | | Esplugues de Llobregat | |
| Román Macaya | Tramvia Blau | | Barcelona | Sarrià-Sant Gervasi |
| Sant Feliu-Consell Comarcal | T3 | | Sant Feliu de Llobregat | |
| Sant Joan Baptista | T5 | | Sant Adrià de Besòs | |
| Sant Martí de Provençals | T5 | L2 | Barcelona | Sant Martí |
| Sant Roc | T5 | L2 | Badalona | |
| Selva de Mar | T4 | L4 | Barcelona | Sant Martí |
| Torreblanca | T3 | | Sant Just Desvern | |
| Walden | T3 | | Sant Just Desvern | |
| Wellington | T4 | | Barcelona | Sant Martí |
| Zona Universitària | T1, T2, T3 | L3 | Barcelona | Les Corts |

== See also ==
- List of Barcelona Metro stations
- List of Rodalies Barcelona railway stations
- List of railway stations in Barcelona
- Trambaix
- Trambesòs
- Tramvia Blau
