= Faculty of Economics and Business, University of Barcelona =

Spanish university department

Faculty of Economics and Business
- Facultat d'Economia i Empresa
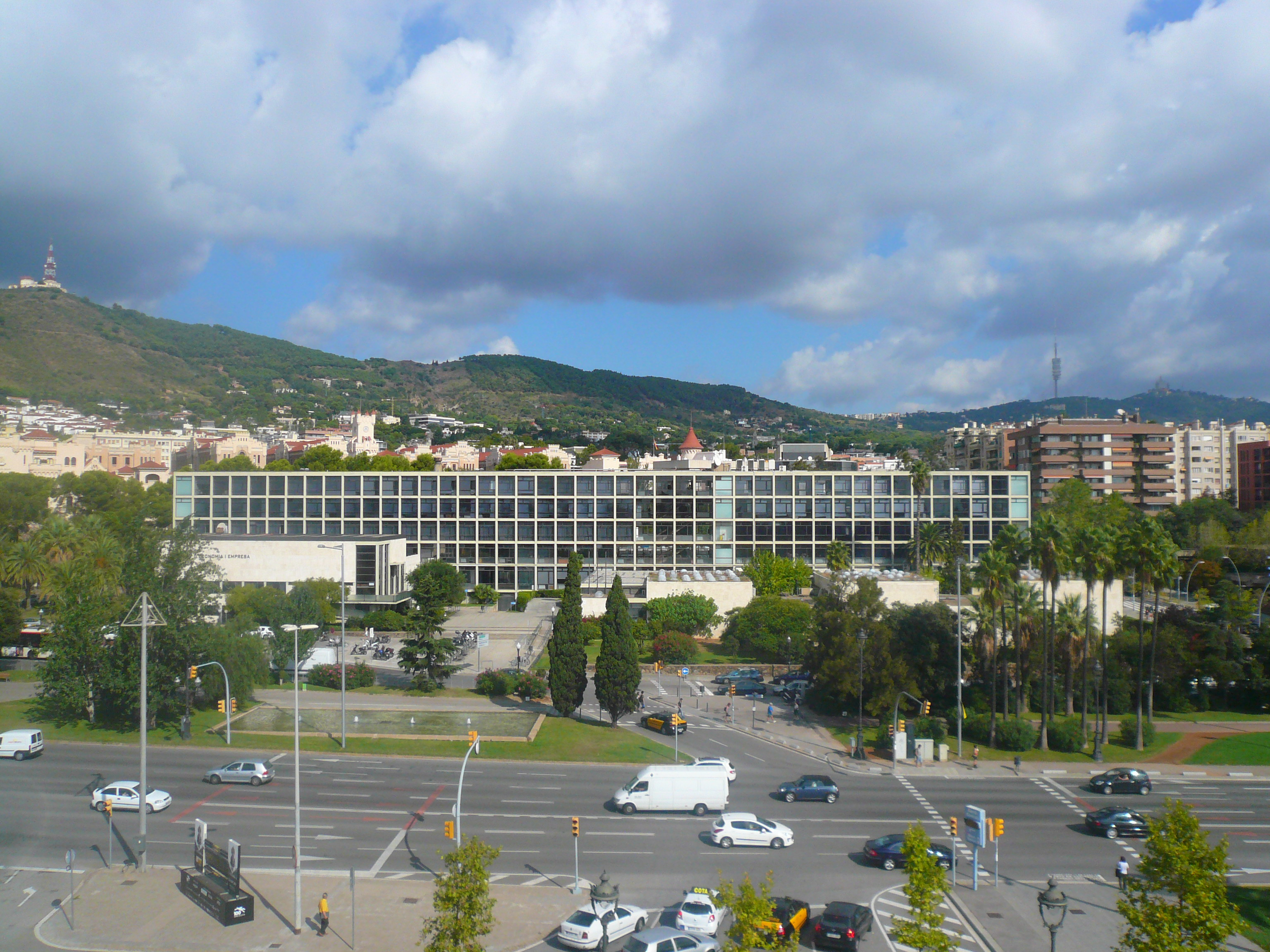
- Building 696
- Type: Public university faculty
- Established: 2008
- Parent institution: University of Barcelona
- Dean: Laura Guitart Tarrés
- Academic staff: 621 (2022)
- Students: 6,478 (2026)
- Location: 690-696 Diagonal Avenue, Barcelona, Catalonia, Spain
- Language: Catalan, Spanish and English
- Research centres: UB School of Economics; UB Business School; UB School of Sociology
- Website: web.ub.edu (FEE)
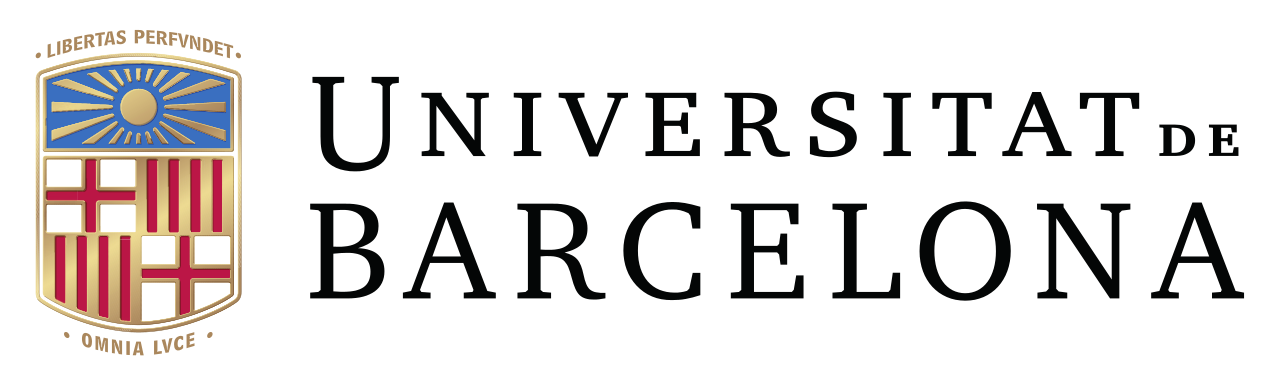

The Faculty of Economics and Business, University of Barcelona (Catalan: Facultat d'Economia i Empresa) is a public faculty of the University of Barcelona dedicated to the higher education and research in the fields of economics, business, statistics and sociology.

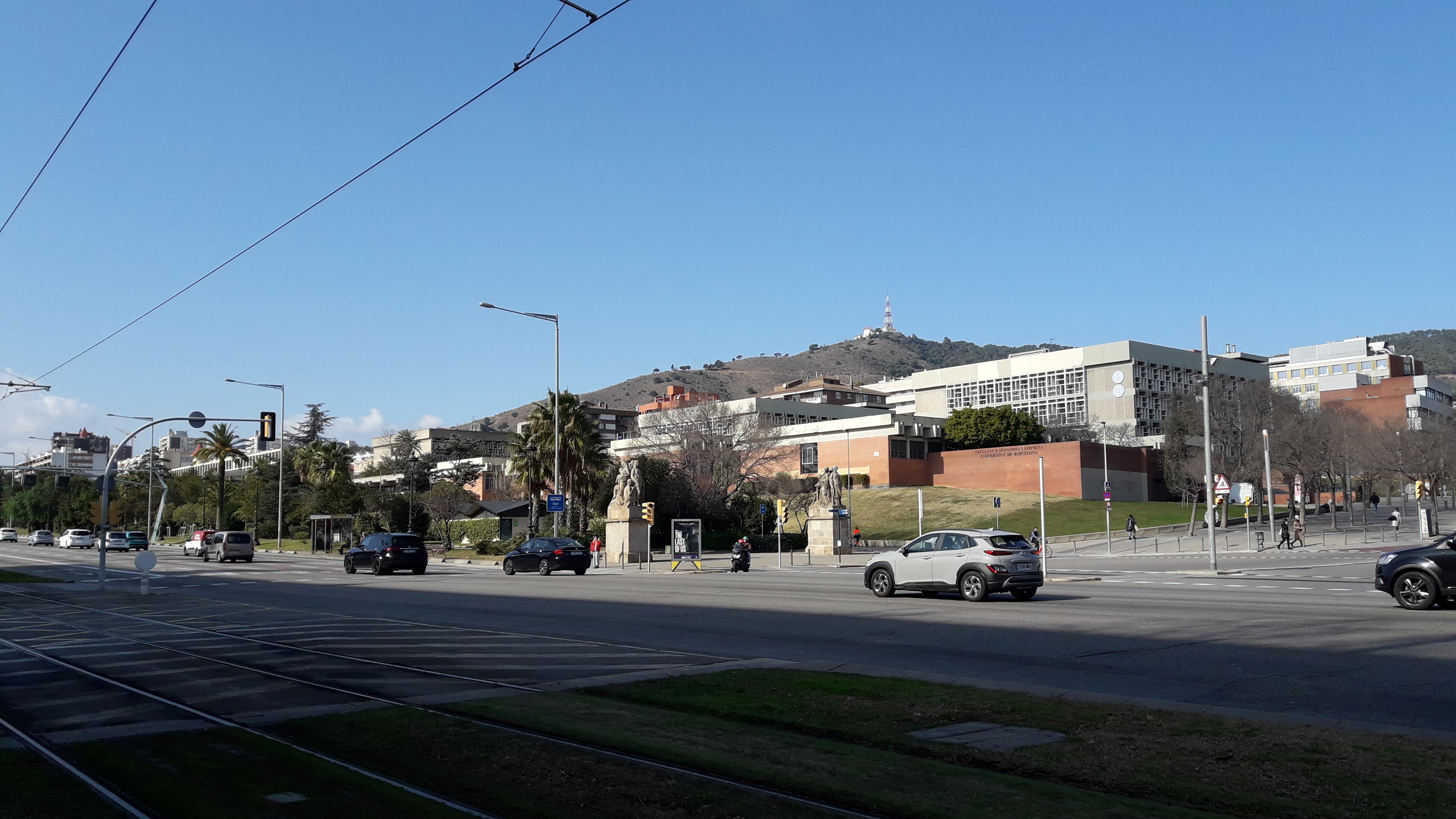
Building 690, in front of the Diagonal Avenue.

== History ==
The first economics studies at the University of Barcelona date back to 1954, taught as a degree at the former Faculty of Political, Economic and Commercial Sciences at the University of Barcelona's Historic Building.

In 1967, the Faculty's own building was inaugurated (current building 690) and in 1972 it was renamed the Faculty of Economic and Business Sciences. In 1971, the School of Advanced Mercantile Studies was integrated into the University of Barcelona, renamed as the University School of Business Studies.

In 2008, the current Faculty of Economics and Business was officially created, as a result of a merger between the Faculty of Economic and Business Sciences and the University School of Business Studies.

== Teaching ==
The Faculty of Economics and Business of the University of Barcelona offers 6 bachelor's degrees (4 years), 5 double bachelor's degrees (6 years), 19 master's degrees (1-2 years) and 6 doctoral programmes:

Study programmes (2026)
Level	Programme
Bachelor's	Business Administration and Management
Bachelor's	Economics
Bachelor's	International Business
Bachelor's	Sociology
Bachelor's	Statistics
Bachelor's	Agri-food Technologies and Business Management (with UPC)
Double bachelor's	Business Administration and Management and Chemistry
Double bachelor's	Business Administration and Management and Sociology
Double bachelor's	Law and Business Administration and Management
Double bachelor's	Mathematics and Business Administration and Management
Double bachelor's	Statistics and Economics
Master's	Accounting and Taxation
Master's	Actuarial and Financial Sciences
Master's	Business Research
Master's	Creation and Management of Innovative Technology-Based Companies
Master's	Cultural Management
Master's	Economic History
Master's	Economics
Master's	Economics, Regulation and Competition in Public Services
Master's	Innovation and Entrepreneurship for Engineering and Biosciences in Health
Master's	Institutions and Political Economy
Master's	International Business
Master's	Internationalization: Economic, Commercial, Legal and Political Aspects
Master's	Marketing and Market Research
Master's	Sociology: Social Transformations and Innovation
Master's	Sport Business Management
Master's	Erasmus Mundus in Global Markets, Local Creativities (main university: University of Glasgow)
Master's	Public Management (with UAB)
Master's	Public Policy (with UPF)
Master's	Statistics and Operations Research (with UPC)
Doctoral	PhD in Economics
Doctoral	PhD in Business
Doctoral	PhD in Statistics and Data Science
Doctoral	PhD in Gender Studies
Doctoral	PhD in Economic History
Doctoral	PhD in Sociology

== Organisation ==
The faculty’s academic and research structure consists of departments, research institutes and research groups, organized into three platforms:

=== UB School of Economics ===
- Department of Econometrics, Statistics and Applied Economics
- Department of Economic History, Institutions and Policy and World Economy
- Department of Economics
- Department of Economic, Financial and Actuarial Mathematics
- Research institutes:
  - Barcelona Economic Analysis Team (BEAT)
  - Barcelona Institute of Economics (IEB)
  - Institute for Research on Applied Regional and Public Economics (IREA)
- Research groups:
  - Center of Economic Analysis and Social Policies (CAEPS-BEAT)
  - Economic History and Development (GRDEPP-BEAT)
  - Economy, Energy and Environmental Pressures (EEEP-BEAT)
  - Energy Sustainability (IEB)
  - Fiscal Federalism and Urban Economics (IEB)
  - Game Theory and Assignment Markets (GTAM-BEAT)
  - Governments and Markets (GiM-IREA)
  - Interdisciplinary Group and Educational Policies (GIPE-IEB)
  - Optimization and Dynamic Games in Economics and Finance (BEAT)
  - Quantitative Regional Analysis (AQR-IREA)
  - Risk, Finance and Insurance (Riskcenter-IREA)
  - Welfare Economics: Theory and Application (CREB-BEAT)

=== UB Business School ===
- Department of Business
- Research groups:
  - Business and Management Research Group

=== UB School of Sociology ===
- Department of Sociology
- Research groups:
  - Applied Research and Knowledge for Society (ARKS)
  - Center for the Study of Culture, Politics and Society (CECUPS)
  - Welfare, Community and Social Control (COPOLIS)
  - Creativity, Innovation and Urban Transformation (CRIT)
  - Studies on Power and Privilege (EPP)
  - Socio-economic Ethics and Epistemology of Social Sciences (GREECS)
  - Sociological Theory and Social Impact of Research (TSIR)
  - Territory, Population and Citizenship

== List of deans ==
The Dean's Office, composed of the dean, vice-deans and the secretary, is the management body an highest authority of the Faculty of Economics and Business.

Since 2008, the Deans of the Faculty have been:

- Antonio Alegre Escolano (2008–2009) (Note: Interim position as dean of the former Faculty of Economic and Business Sciences.)
- Elisenda Paluzie i Hernández (2009–2017)
- Ramon Alemany Leira (2017–2025)
- Laura Guitart Tarrés (2025–present)
