= Maria Cristina station =

Barcelona Metro station

Maria Cristina
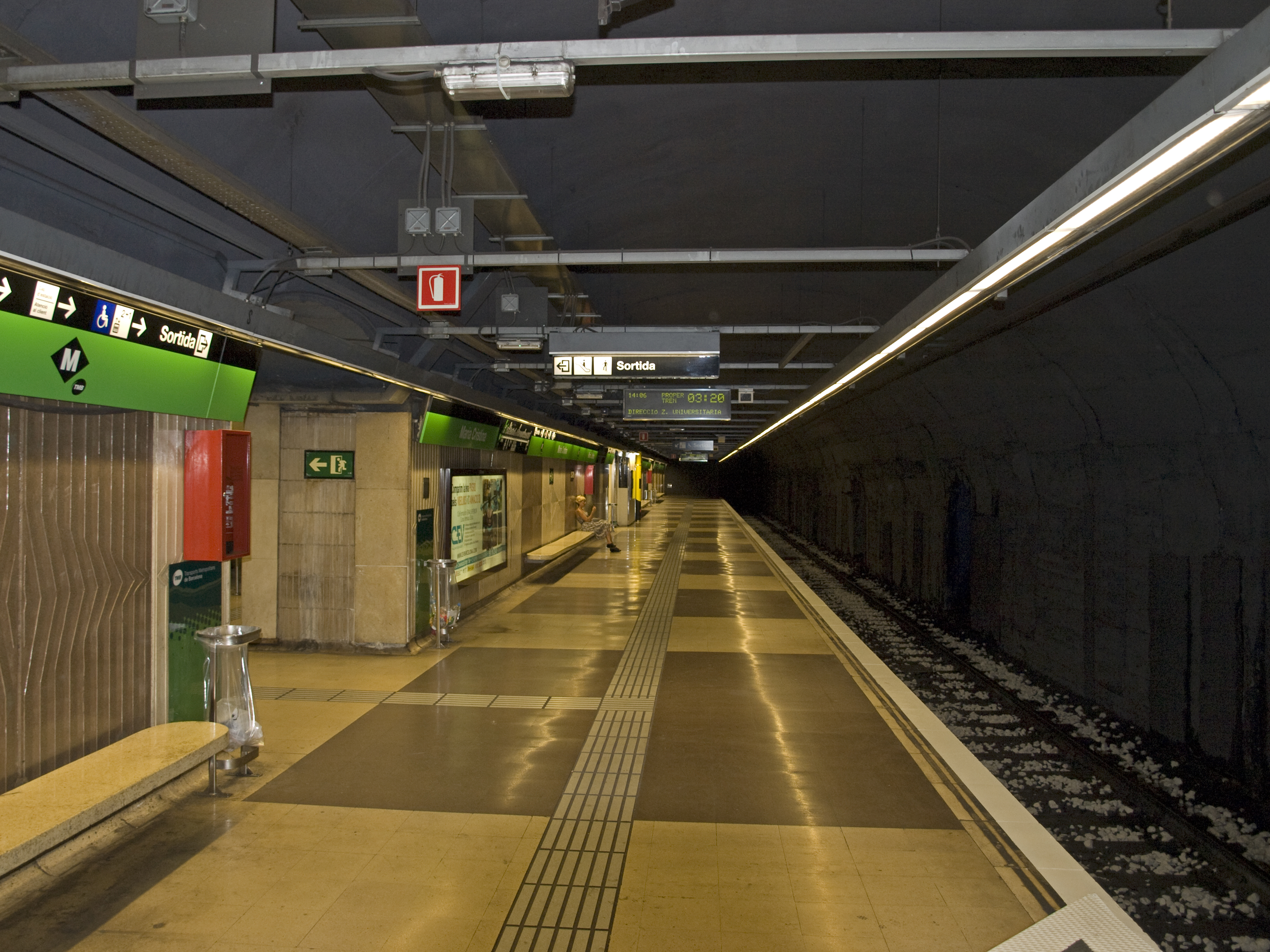
- Platform view of Maria Cristina station

General information
- Location: Barcelona (Les Corts); Barcelona, Spain
- Coordinates: 41°23′17″N 2°7′35″E
- System: Barcelona Metro rapid transit station Trambaix tram stop
- Operator: Transports Metropolitans de Barcelona
- Line: 1
- Platforms: 2 side platform

Other information
- Fare zone: 1 (ATM)

History
- Opened: 1975

Services
Preceding station	Metro	Following station
Palau Reial towards Zona Universitària	L3	Les Corts towards Trinitat Nova
Location
- Location within Barcelona

Maria Cristina (Catalan pronunciation: [məˈɾi.ə kɾisˈtinə]) is a station in the Barcelona Metro and Trambaix networks, in the Les Corts district of Barcelona. It is served by metro line L3 and tram lines T1, T2 and T3.

The metro station is located under the Avinguda Diagonal, between Carrer del Doctor Ferran and Gran Via de Carles III. It has two 94-metre (308 ft) long side platforms. The tram station is located in the Avinguda Diagonal, immediately above the metro station. Both stations lie in front of the La Caixa headquarters in La Maternitat i Sant Ramon.

The metro station is named after Avinguda de la Reina Maria Cristina and was opened in 1975, along with the other stations of the section of L3 between Zona Universitària and Sants Estació stations. This section was originally operated separately from L3, and known as L3b, until the two sections were joined in 1982. The tram station was inaugurated in 2004, the year regular Trambaix service started.

== See also ==
- List of Barcelona Metro stations
- List of tram stations in Barcelona
