= Bon Viatge station =

Train station in Spain

Coordinates: 41°21′52.61″N 2°03′31.71″E

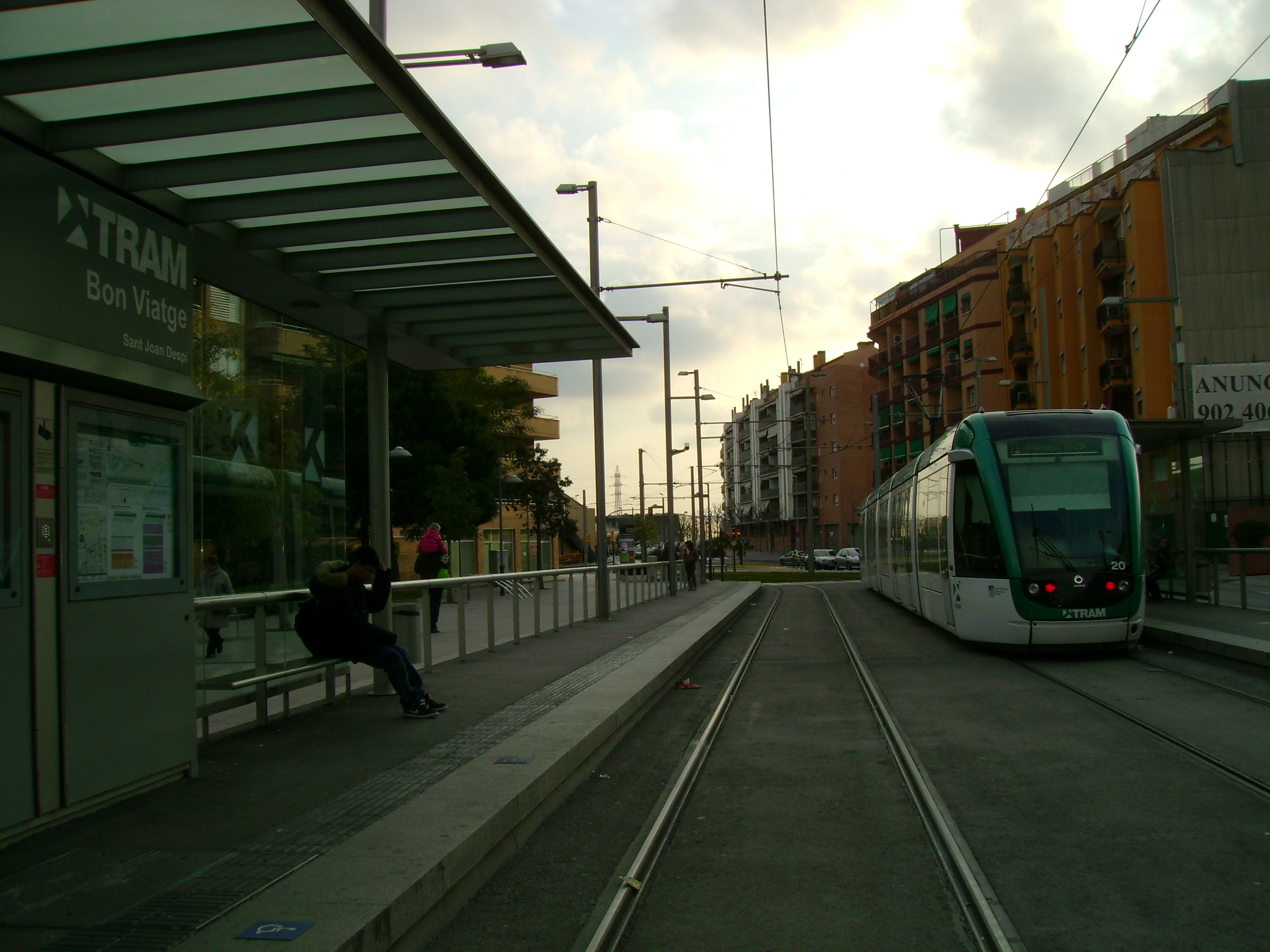
Bon Viatge railway station

Bon Viatge (Catalan pronunciation: [ˈbɔm biˈadʒə]) is a Trambaix station located in Sant Joan Despí, to the west of Barcelona. This stop includes two of the three Trambaix routes (T1 and T2). It is named after the main street in Sant Joan Despí's old town (Barri Centre in Catalan).

== Rail services ==
Preceding station	TRAM	Following station
Terminus	T1	Fontsanta – Fatjó towards Francesc Macià
La Fontsanta towards Llevant-Les Planes	T2	Fontsanta – Fatjó towards Francesc Macià
