= Avinguda Diagonal =

Thoroughfare in Barcelona, Spain

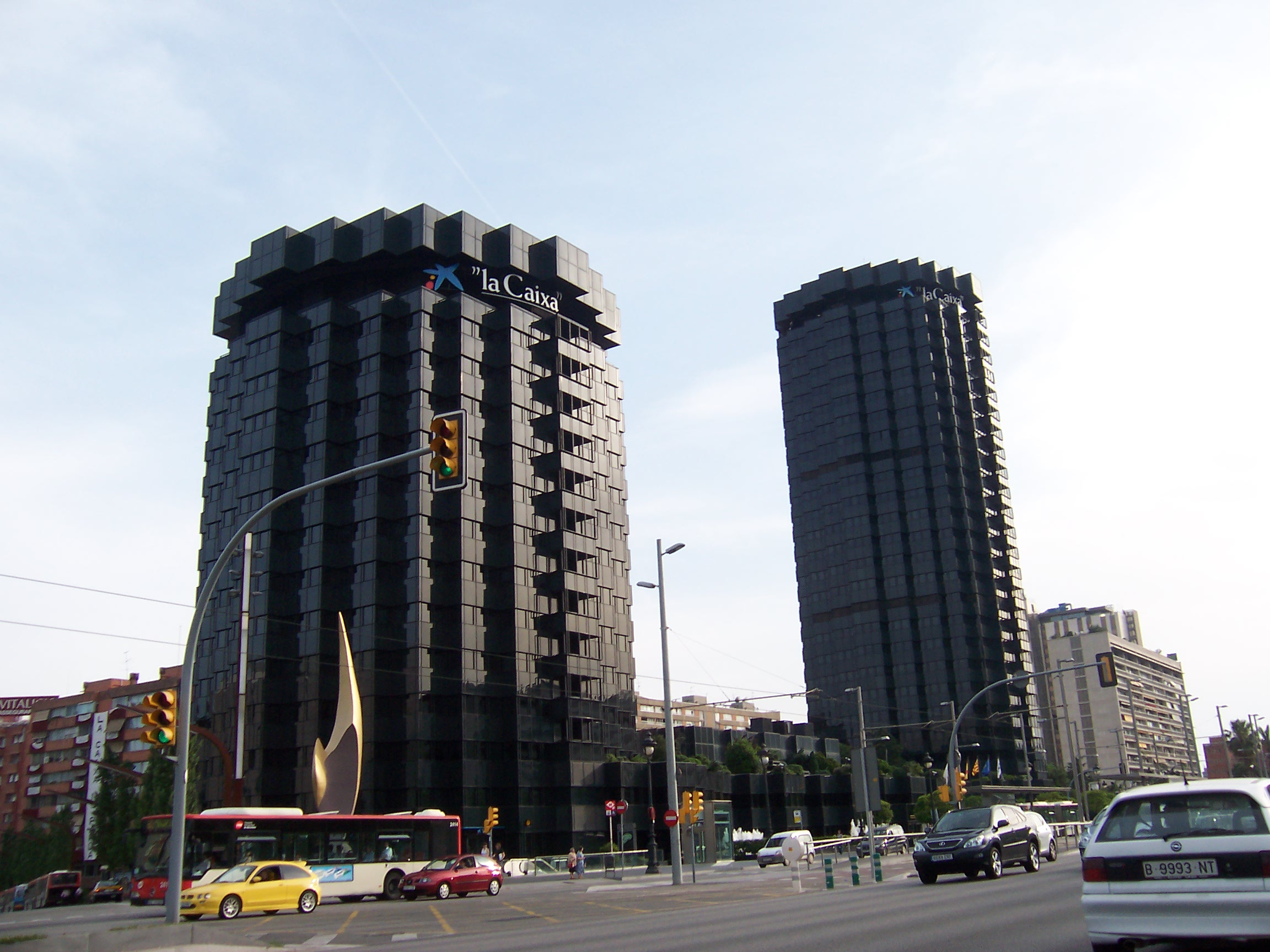
- La Caixa Headquarters on Avinguda Diagonal
- Interactive map of Avinguda Diagonal
- Length: 11 km (6.8 mi)
- Location: Barcelona, Catalonia, Spain
- Coordinates: 41°23′47″N 2°09′29″E
- From: Les Corts
- To: Sant Martí

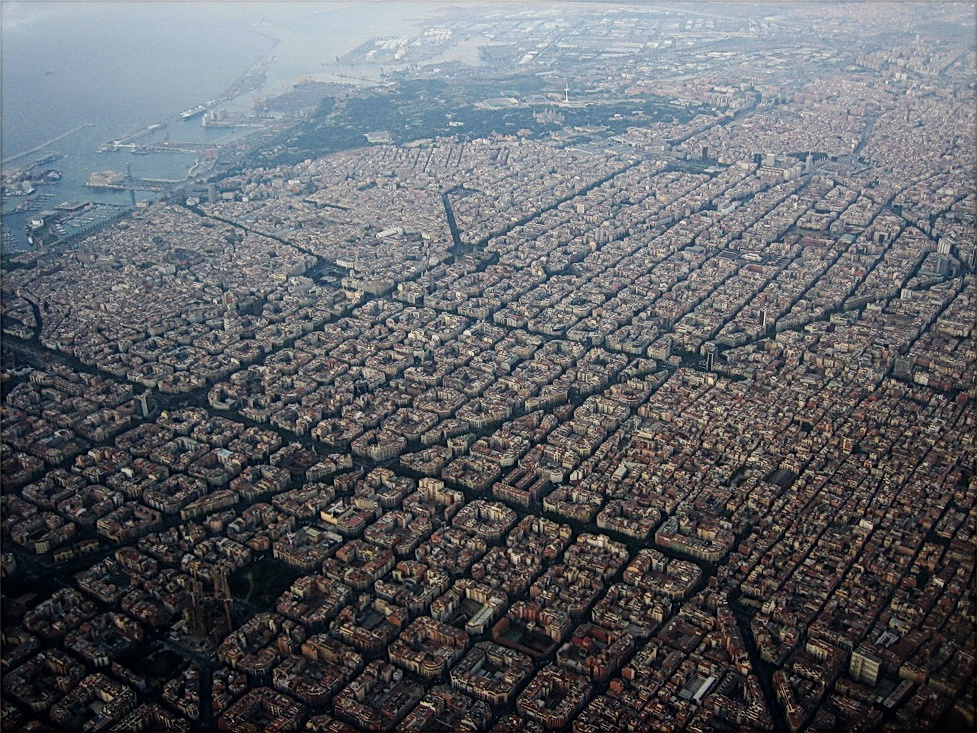
Aerial view of Eixample; the Diagonal is visible as the line cutting through the pattern of blocks.

Avinguda Diagonal (Catalan: [əβiŋˈɡuðə ði.əɣuˈnal]; Spanish: Avenida Diagonal; transl. 'Diagonal Avenue') is the name of one of Barcelona's broadest and most important avenues. It cuts the city in two, diagonally with respect to the grid pattern of the surrounding streets, hence the name.

It was originally projected by engineer and urban planner Ildefons Cerdà as one of the city's wide avenues, which along with Avinguda Meridiana would cut the rationalist grid he designed for Eixample (Catalan for 'Expansion'). Both would meet at Plaça de les Glòries Catalanes, which Cerdà envisioned as the new city centre. However, Plaça Catalunya, equally a new addition to the city of Barcelona, and connecting Ciutat Vella and Eixample, and therefore occupying a more privileged position in the urban area, would finally become the centre. Avinguda Diagonal remains to this day a much-transited avenue and many companies and hotels use it as a privileged location, as can be seen in its architecture.

The avenue starts in the Les Corts district on the western edge of the city and runs to the Sant Martí district on the eastern edge. To its west, it connects with the Lleida-Madrid highway and Ronda de Dalt in the neighbouring municipality of Esplugues de Llobregat. To its east, it meets the Ronda del Litoral on the border with the municipality of Sant Adrià de Besòs. It is consistently 50 metres (160 ft) wide and about 11 kilometres (6.8 mi) long.

== Name ==
The different regimes that held power in Catalonia and Spain during the 20th century sought to change the city's street names, and Avinguda Diagonal was permitted no exception. It has been known under the following names:

- Gran Via Diagonal – original name which Ildefons Cerdà and Víctor Balaguer intended to call the avenue.
- Avinguda d'Argüelles – 1891. Named after Agustín Argüelles (1776–1844).
- Avinguda de la Nacionalitat Catalana – 1922. After the Commonwealth of Catalonia.
- Avenida de Alfonso XIII −1924. During Primo de Rivera's dictatorship, named after King Alfonso XIII.
- Avinguda del Catorze d'Abril – 1931. Second Spanish Republic (1931–1939).
- Gran Vía Diagonal – 1939, provisional name imposed the day after the Fascist capture of Barcelona as an attempt to eliminate references to the Republic.
- Avenida del Generalísimo Francisco Franco – 1939. During the authoritarian regime of Francisco Franco.
- Avinguda Diagonal – Its current name, adopted following the restoration of democracy in 1979.

The name "Diagonal" has always prevailed in popular usage.

== History ==
=== Early history ===
Ildefons Cerdà's plan was not totally successful in transforming Barcelona's urban reality, as only parts of it were finally approved. The construction of Avinguda Diagonal is one of the projects it entailed that became reality, when a Royal Decree from Queen Isabella II and Leopoldo O'Donnell allowed him to start the construction of the avenue in 1859. The city council of Barcelona had previously requested the approval of Antoni Rovira i Trias's alternative project instead, which had been rejected by the Spanish monarchy.

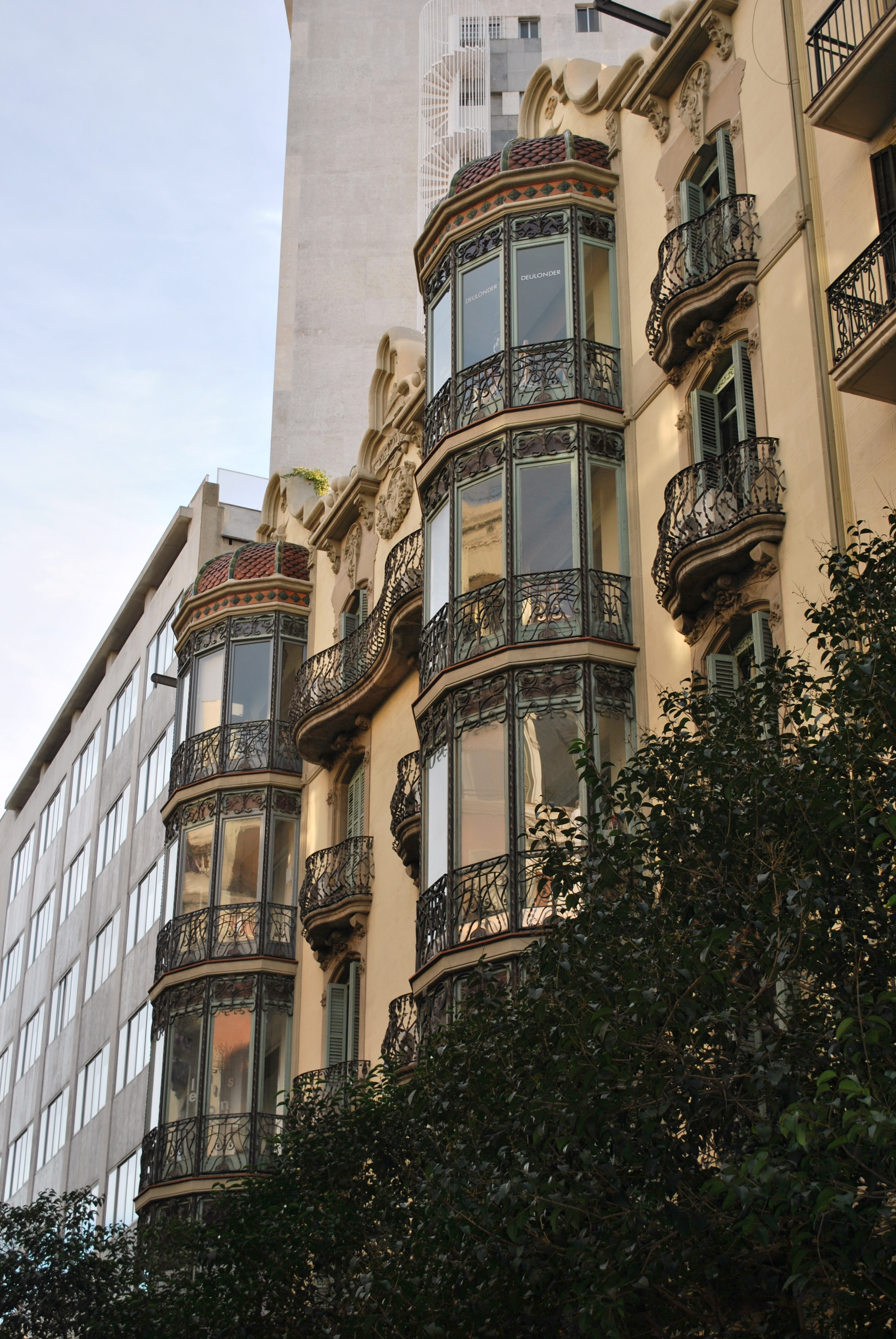
Apartment building on Avinguda Diagonal from the beginning of the 20th century

After the completion of its central section, from the current Plaça de Francesc Macià towards Glòries, it soon became one of Barcelona's most popular avenues and an ideal place for the Catalan aristocrats and bourgeoisie to exhibit their carriages. Francesc Cambó, leader of Lliga Regionalista proposed the construction of a new palace for the then monarch Alfonso XIII in 1919 (the royal palace in Ciutat Vella had been destroyed in the fire of 1875).

=== Recent history ===
Avinguda Diagonal suffered several attacks by the Basque separatist organisation ETA in 2000. On 2 November, a car bomb exploded injuring a security officer and a municipal officer. A few days later, on 21 November, a car used by the killers of Ernest Lluch exploded in the middle of the avenue. On 20 December a municipal officer was shot dead.

Four venues in the area hosted competitions for the 1992 Summer Olympics.

During 2010, Diagonal reform proposals were on the headlines, as the Barcelona city council had plans to make the tram cross the whole avenue. A popular consultation (the word referendum being banned by Spanish law) was scheduled for May 2010 between two reform proposals, the so-called rambla or boulevard. It resulted in a big political failure for the city mayor, Jordi Hereu. There was a bare participation of 12% of potential voters, and about 80% voted for the third option none of the former two, that is, against any change.

== Buildings and places of interest ==
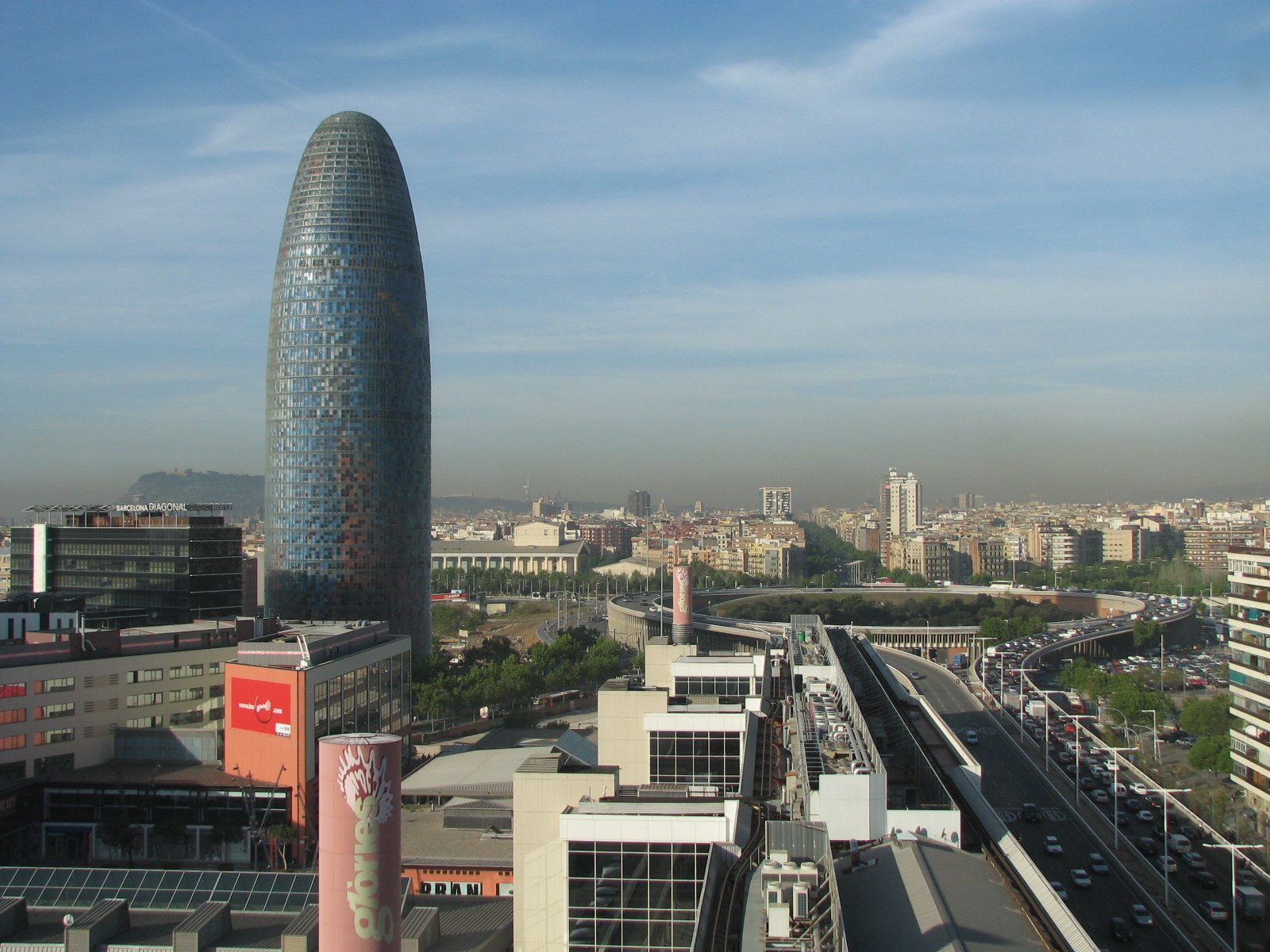
Torre Agbar

=== Architecture ===
- Casa del Baró de Quadras (Museu de la Música) – designed by Josep Puig i Cadafalch (1904–1906)
- Casa Comalat – designed by Salvador Valeri i Pupurull (1906–1911)
- Església del Carme – designed by Josep Domènech i Estapà, neo-Byzantine style (1909)
- Casa Serra – also designed by Josep Puig i Cadafalch, became a school.
- Casa de Terrades, also known as Casa de les Punxes – Eixample's widest building, designed by Puig i Cadafalch (1903–1905)
- ME Barcelona hotel, designed by Dominique Perrault (2007).
- Palau Pérez Samanillo
- Casa Sayrach – (1918)
- Palau Reial de Pedralbes (1921), built for Alfonso XIII of Spain and its gardens. (1924).
- Torre Agbar – designed by Jean Nouvel, next to Plaça de les Glòries Catalanes (2005).
- La Caixa Headquarters
- Disseny Hub Barcelona

=== Shopping centres ===
- L'Illa
- El Corte Inglés Avinguda Diagonal
- El Corte Inglés Francesc Macià
- Diagonal Mar
- Glòries
- Pedralbes Centre

=== Cinemas ===
- CINESA Diagonal Mar
- Boliche
- CINESA Diagonal
- Glòries Multicines

== Education ==
Avinguda Diagonal is also home to several schools of both University of Barcelona (UB) and Polytechnic University of Catalonia, in the area that is commonly known as Zona Universitària.

The following UB faculties and schools are located on the avenue:

- Biology (Av. Diagonal, 645)
- Chemical Engineering (Av. Diagonal, 647)
- Chemistry (Av. Diagonal, 647)
- Economics and Business (Av. Diagonal, 696–690)
- Law (Av. Diagonal, 684)
- Materials Engineering (Av. Diagonal, 647)
- Physics (Av. Diagonal, 647)

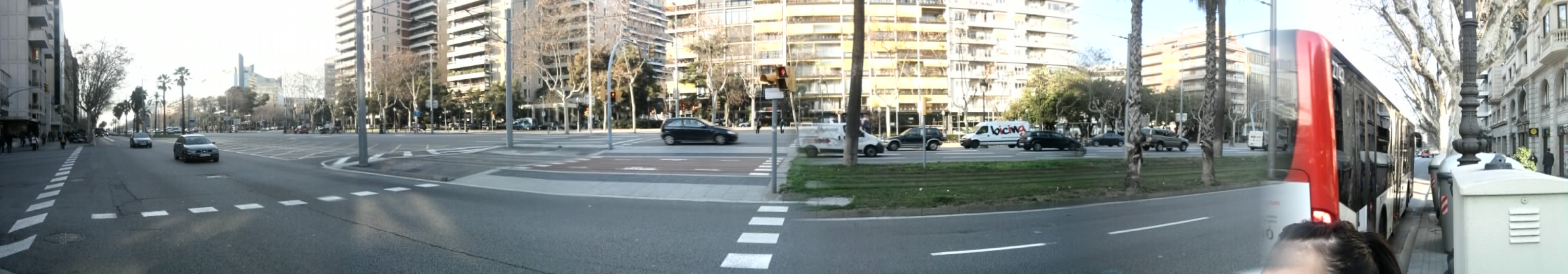
Panoramic photograph of Avinguda Diagonal, Barcelona in January 2011

== Transport ==
=== Metro ===
The avenue is served by a number of metro stations:

- Zona Universitària (L3, L9)
- Palau Reial (L3)
- Maria Cristina (L3)
- Diagonal (L3, L5) – In and around Passeig de Gràcia.
- Provença (L6, L7) – In Carrer Provença, linked with Diagonal station.
- Verdaguer (L4, L5) – In Plaça Verdaguer
- Glòries (L1) – in Plaça de les Glòries Catalanes.
- Selva de Mar (L4).
- El Maresme Fòrum (L4).

=== Tram ===
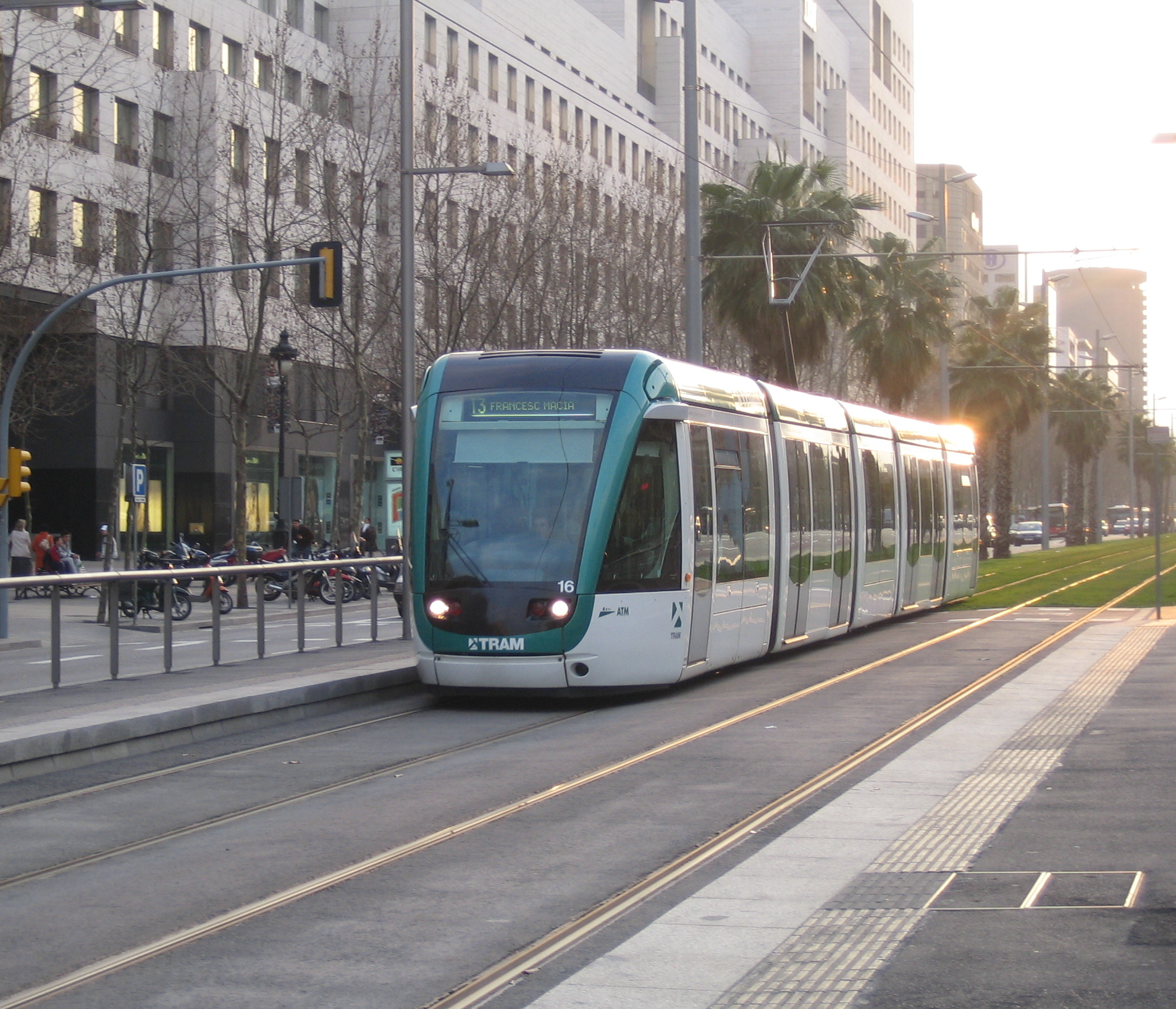
Trambaix line in front of L'Illa

Currently, the tram that goes along the avenue is split in two. There is an ongoing project to join the two tram infrastructures and allow the tram to go through all of the avenue.

Trambaix

- Zona Universitària (T1, T2, T3)
- Palau Reial (T1, T2, T3)
- Maria Cristina (T1, T2, T3)
- Numància (T1, T2, T3)
- L'Illa (T1, T2, T3)
- Francesc Macià (T1, T2, T3)

Trambesòs

- Verdaguer (T4)
- Sicília (T4)
- Monumental (T4)
- Glòries (T4, T5, T6)
- Ca L'Aranyó (T4)
- Pere IV (T4)
- Fluvià (T4)
- Selva de Mar (T4)
- El Maresme (T4)
- Fòrum (T4)

== See also ==
- History of Barcelona
- History of Catalonia
- History of Spain
- 2004 Universal Forum of Cultures
- Street names in Barcelona
- Urban planning of Barcelona

== Sources ==
- ALBAREDA, Joaquim, GUÀRDIA, Manel i altres. Enciclopèdia de Barcelona, Gran Enciclopèdia Catalana, Barcelona, 2006.
