= Palau Reial station =

Metro station in Barcelona, Spain

Palau Reial
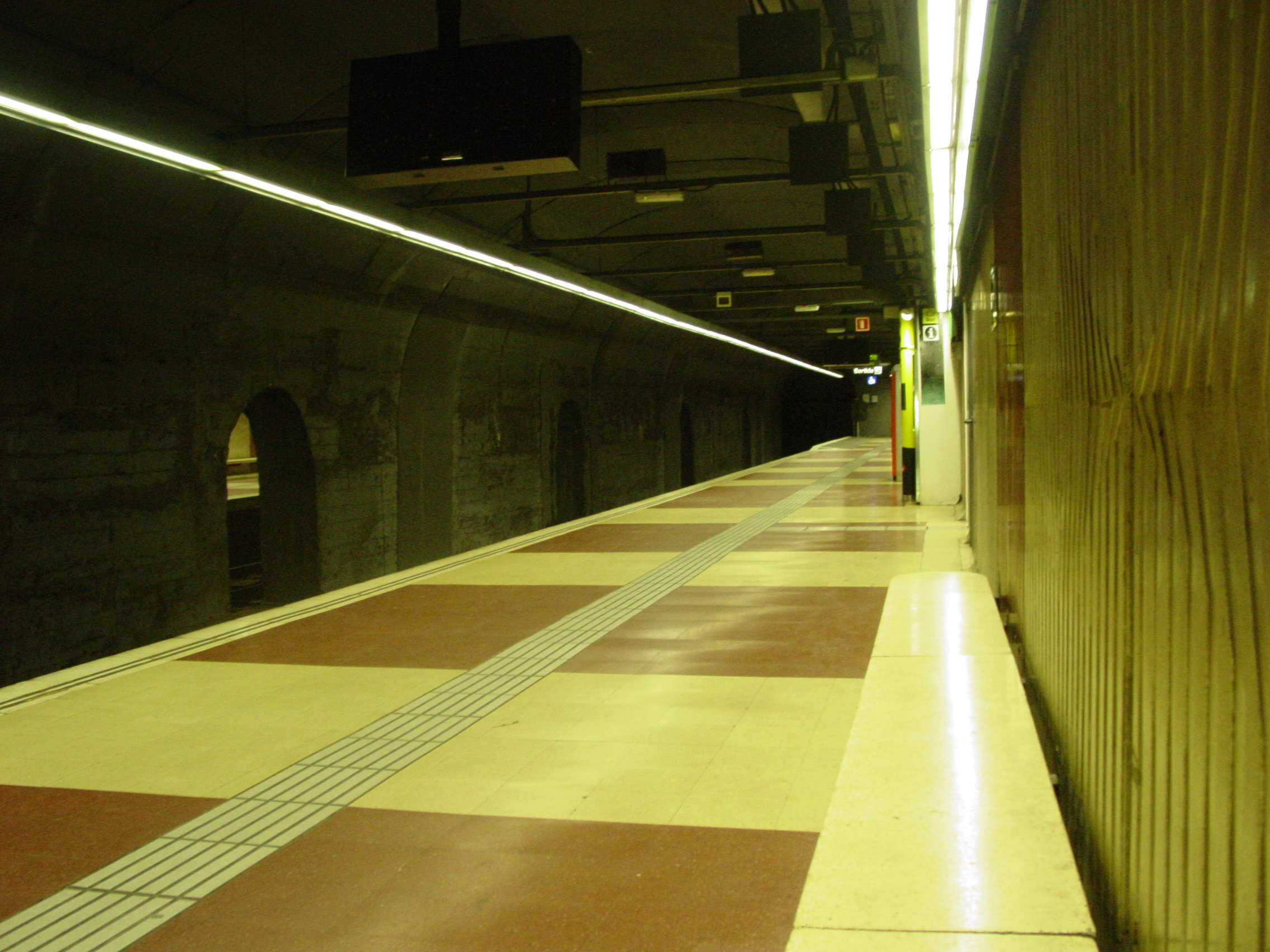
- Platform view of Palau Reial station

General information
- Location: Barcelona (Les Corts)
- Coordinates: 41°23′10″N 2°7′7″E
- System: Barcelona Metro rapid transit station
- Operator: Transports Metropolitans de Barcelona

Other information
- Fare zone: 1 (ATM)

History
- Opened: 1975

Services
Preceding station	Metro	Following station
Zona Universitària Terminus	L3	Maria Cristina towards Trinitat Nova
Location
- Location within Barcelona

Palau Reial (Catalan pronunciation: [pəˈlaw rəˈjal]) is a station in the Barcelona Metro and Trambaix networks, in the Les Corts district of Barcelona. It is served by metro line L3 and tram lines T1, T2 and T3. The station draws its name from the nearby minor royal palace in Pedralbes built for Alfonso XIII in 1924, part of which nowadays hosts a Museum of Decorative Arts.

The metro station is located under Avinguda Diagonal, between Carrer del Tinent Coronel Valenzuela and the biology faculty of the University of Barcelona. It has two 94-metre (308 ft) long side platforms. The tram station is located in the Avinguda Diagonal, immediately above the metro station.

The metro station opened in 1975, along with the other stations of the section of L3 between Zona Universitària and Sants Estació stations. This section was originally operated separately from L3, and known as L3b, until the two sections were joined in 1982.

== See also ==
- List of Barcelona Metro stations
- List of tram stations in Barcelona
