= Zona Universitària station =

Metro station in Barcelona, Spain

Zona Universitària
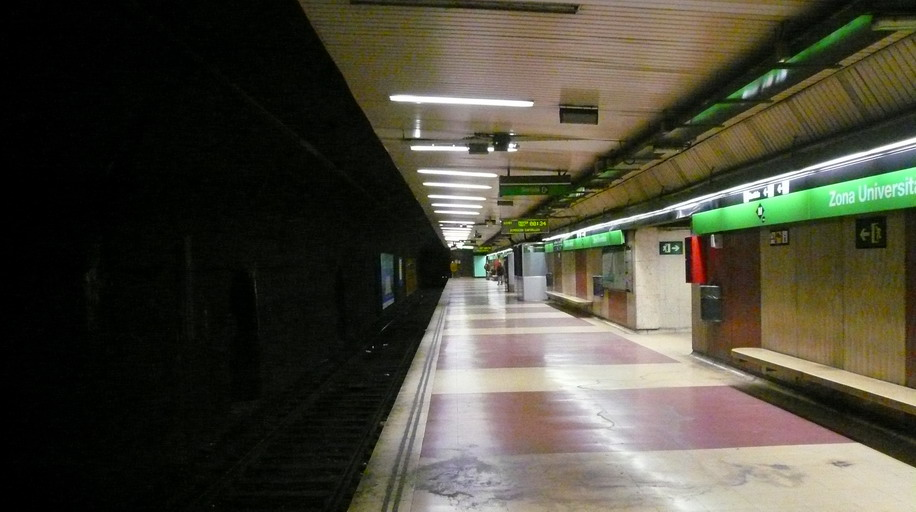
- Barcelona Metro line 3 station platforms.

General information
- Location: Barcelona (Les Corts)
- Coordinates: 41.384°N 2.112°E
- System: TMB rapid transit station TRAM tram stop
- Operator: Transports Metropolitans de Barcelona (Barcelona Metro stations); TRAM (Trambaix stop)
- Lines: Barcelona Metro line 3; Barcelona Metro line 9 (under construction); Trambaix

Construction
- Structure type: Underground

Other information
- Fare zone: 1 (ATM Àrea de Barcelona)

History
- Opened: 1975

Services
Preceding station	Metro	Following station
Terminus	L3	Palau Reial towards Trinitat Nova
Collblanc towards Airport T1	L9 Sud	Terminus
Projected
Finestrelles - Sant Joan de Déu towards Sant Feliu Centre	L3	Palau Reial towards Trinitat Nova
Camp Nou towards Airport T1	L9	Campus Nord towards Can Zam
Camp Nou towards Polígon Pratenc	L10	Campus Nord towards Gorg
Location
- Location within Barcelona Location within Spain

Zona Universitària (Catalan pronunciation: [ˈzonə uniβərsiˈtaɾi.ə]) is a station in the Barcelona Metro and Trambaix networks, in the Les Corts district of Barcelona. It is currently the western terminus of metro line L3 and L9. Also it's served by tram lines T1, T2 and T3. It is named after the Universitat de Barcelona campus of the same name.

The metro station is located under Avinguda Diagonal, between Carrer González Tablas and Avinguda Dr. Marañón. It has five entrances, two on each side of Avinguda Diagonal, one in Avinguda Dr. Marañón, and two 94-metre (308 ft) long side platforms. The entrance lobby features an artwork by the sculptor Angel Orensanz. The Trambaix stop lies some 250 metres (820 ft) to the east, in Carrer d'Adolf Florensa.

The metro station opened in 1975, along with the other stations of the section of L3 between Zona Universitària and Sants Estació stations. This section was originally operated separately from L3, and known as L3b, until the two sections were joined in 1982. In February 2016, the south branch of the L9 it opened from Aeroport T1 to this station, as a provisional terminal until it continue to connect the other branch of the line.

It is planned that the station will be served by the common section of metro lines L9 and L10, and work is currently underway to build the L10 and the extension to the upper area of the city of these lines. In the longer term, an extension of line L3 beyond Zona Universitària is planned.

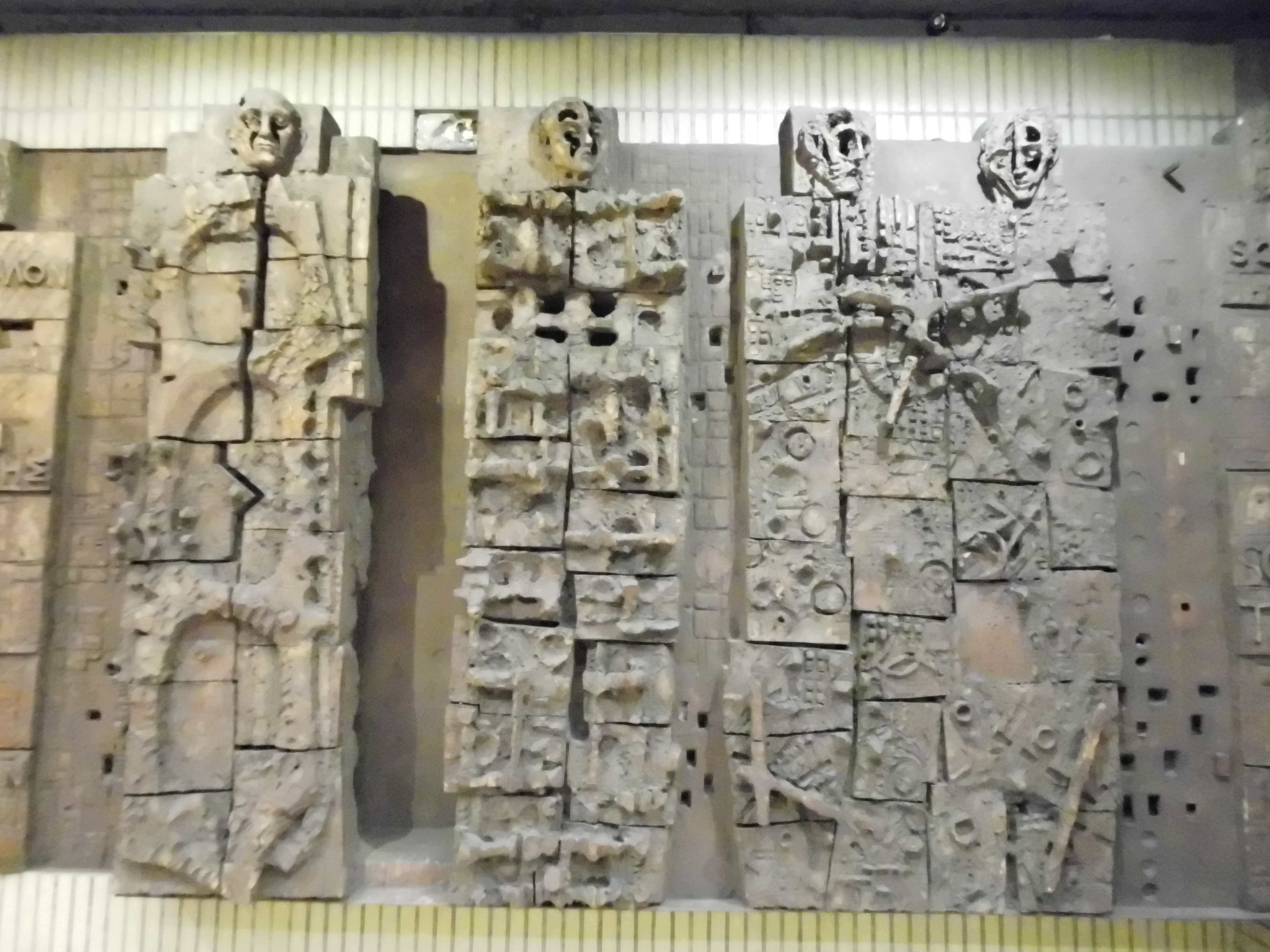
Art work by Angel Orensanz in the metro station

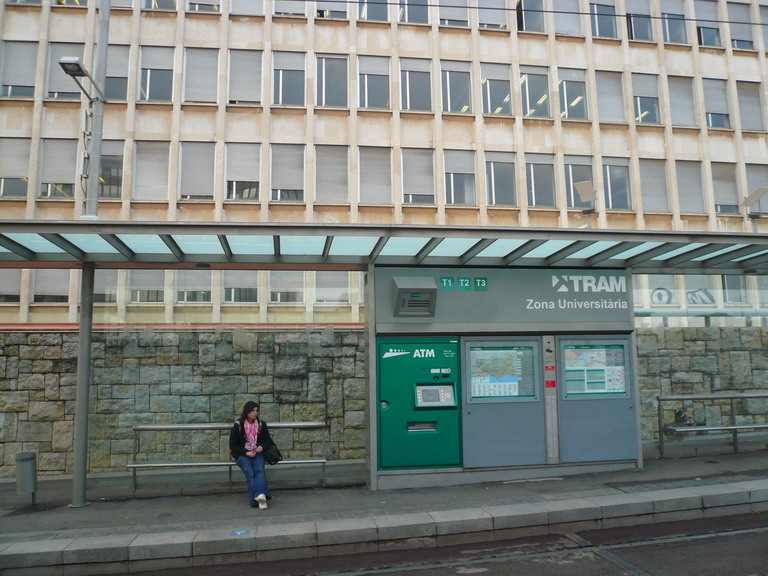
The Trambaix stop

== See also ==
- University of Barcelona
- List of Barcelona Metro stations
- List of tram stations in Barcelona
