= Trambaix =

Tram system in Barcelona

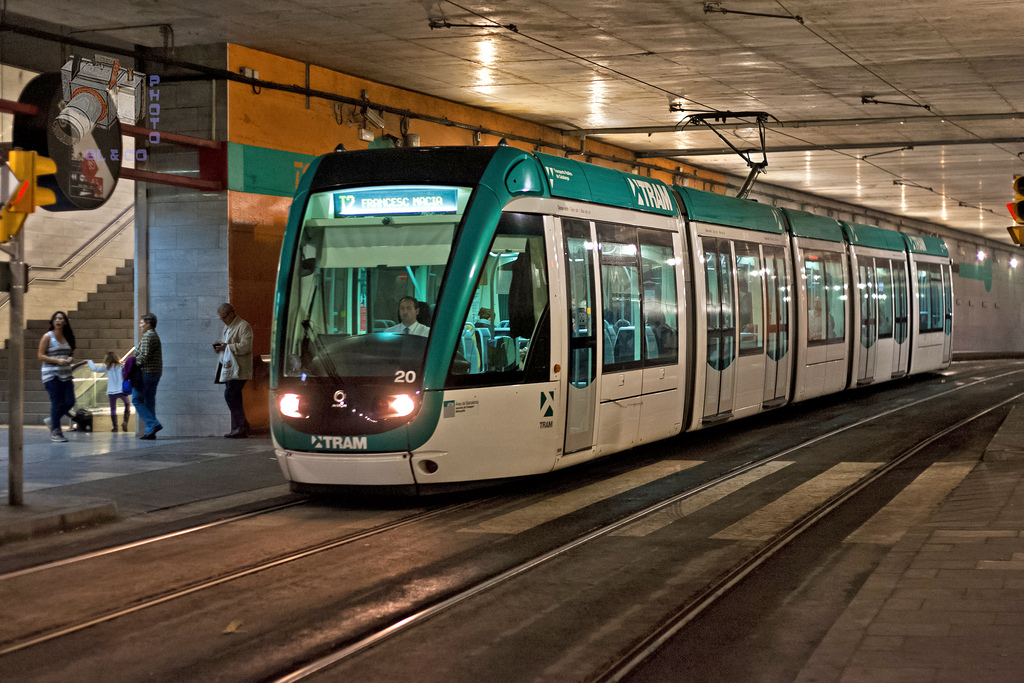
- A tram leaving Cornellà Centre station towards Francesc Macià

Overview
- Native name: Trambaix
- Locale: Barcelona
- Transit type: Tram
- Number of lines: 3
- Number of stations: 64
- Annual ridership: Approx. 15 million (2014)
- Website: www.tram.cat

Operation
- Began operation: 2004
- Operator: Tramvia Metropolità S.A.
- Character: At-grade
- Rolling stock: Alstom Citadis 302

Technical
- System length: 32.089 km (19.939 mi)
- Track gauge: 1,435 mm (4 ft 8 1/2 in) standard gauge
- Electrification: Overhead line, 750 V DC

The Trambaix (Catalan pronunciation: [ˌtramˈbaʃ]) is one of Barcelona's three tram systems. It is operated by TRAMMET connecting the Baix Llobregat area with the city of Barcelona, Catalonia, Spain. It opened to the public on 5 April 2004 after a weekend when the tram could be used free of charge.

The Trambaix includes three different routes (T1, T2 and T3). The tram route starts at Plaça Francesc Macià in Barcelona to the west of the city and extends west, passing L'Hospitalet de Llobregat, Esplugues de Llobregat, Cornellà de Llobregat, Sant Joan Despí and Sant Just Desvern. An extension of Tram T3 opened on 8 December 2006, as far as Consell Comarcal in Sant Feliu de Llobregat. The yearly ridership of all of its lines combined is of 15,057,318 passengers as of 2008.

The Trambaix complements the Trambesòs that runs to the north-east of the city. Both networks will be interconnected through Avinguda Diagonal in the next construction phase.

== T1 route ==
- Francesc Macià
- L'Illa
- Numància
- Maria Cristina (L3)
- Pius XII
- Palau Reial (L3)
- Zona Universitària (L3, L9)
- Avinguda de Xile
- Ernest Lluch (L5)
- Can Rigal
- Ca n'Oliveres
- Can Clota
- Pont d'Esplugues
- La Sardana
- Montesa
- El Pedró
- Ignasi Iglésias
- Cornellà Centre (L5)
- Les Aigües
- Fontsanta i Fatjó
- Bon Viatge

== T2 route ==
A tram on the shared section of lines T1 and T2 in Cornellà de Llobregat in 2024

A tram on Avinguda Diagonal in Barcelona on line T2 in 2020

- Francesc Macià
- L'Illa
- Numància
- Maria Cristina (L3)
- Pius XII
- Palau Reial (L3)
- Zona Universitària (L3, L9)
- Avinguda de Xile
- Ernest Lluch (L5)
- Can Rigal
- Ca n'Oliveres
- Can Clota
- Pont d'Esplugues
- La Sardana
- Montesa
- El Pedró
- Ignasi Iglésias
- Cornellà Centre (L5)
- Les Aigües
- Fontsanta | Fatjó
- Bon Viatge
- La Fontsanta
- Centre Miquel Martí i Pol
- Llevant-Les Planes (Previously called Sant Martí de l'Erm)

== T3 route ==
A Citadis 302 on line T3 just west of Walden station

- Francesc Macià
- L'Illa
- Numància
- Maria Cristina (L3)
- Pius XII
- Palau Reial (L3)
- Zona Universitària (L3, L9)
- Avinguda de Xile
- Ernest Lluch (L5)
- Can Rigal
- Ca n'Oliveres
- Can Clota
- Pont d'Esplugues
- La Sardana
- Montesa
- Sant Martí de l'Erm (Previously called Hospital Sant Joan Despi | TV3)
- Rambla Sant Just
- Walden
- Torreblanca
- Sant Feliu-Consell Comarcal

== Future plans ==
Since the modern tram system launched in 2004, the possibility was envisaged to connect Trambaix and Trambesòs. In September 2008 the mayor of Barcelona, Jordi Hereu, said in a TV programme that in the near future (2011–2012) both tram networks would be connected along the Diagonal Avenue. Despite the Generalitat de Catalunya's efforts to promote it, the project remained on hold for over a decade. Finally in January 2019, Barcelona's city council approved the project with the support of mayor Ada Colau.

The project is divided into two phases. Phase 1 extends the Trambesòs network from Glòries to Verdaguer, serving Monumental and Sicília along the way. Monumental will provide an interchange with Line 2 of the Barcelona Metro. Verdaguer will provide an interchange with line 4 and line 5. The route is 1.8km and has a travel time of 7 minutes. This phase entered construction in 2022 and opened in November 2024. Phase 2 will link Verdaguer with Francesc Macià, thus completing the connection of the two separate tram networks. This section would serve the stations of Diagonal, Balmes and Casanova. Works are expected to begin once phase 1 has been completed.

Line map with the Trambesòs connection and other expansions

== See also ==
- Barcelona Metro
- List of tram stations in Barcelona
- Trambesòs
- Tramvia Blau
