= Monumental station =

Metro station in Barcelona, Spain

Monumental
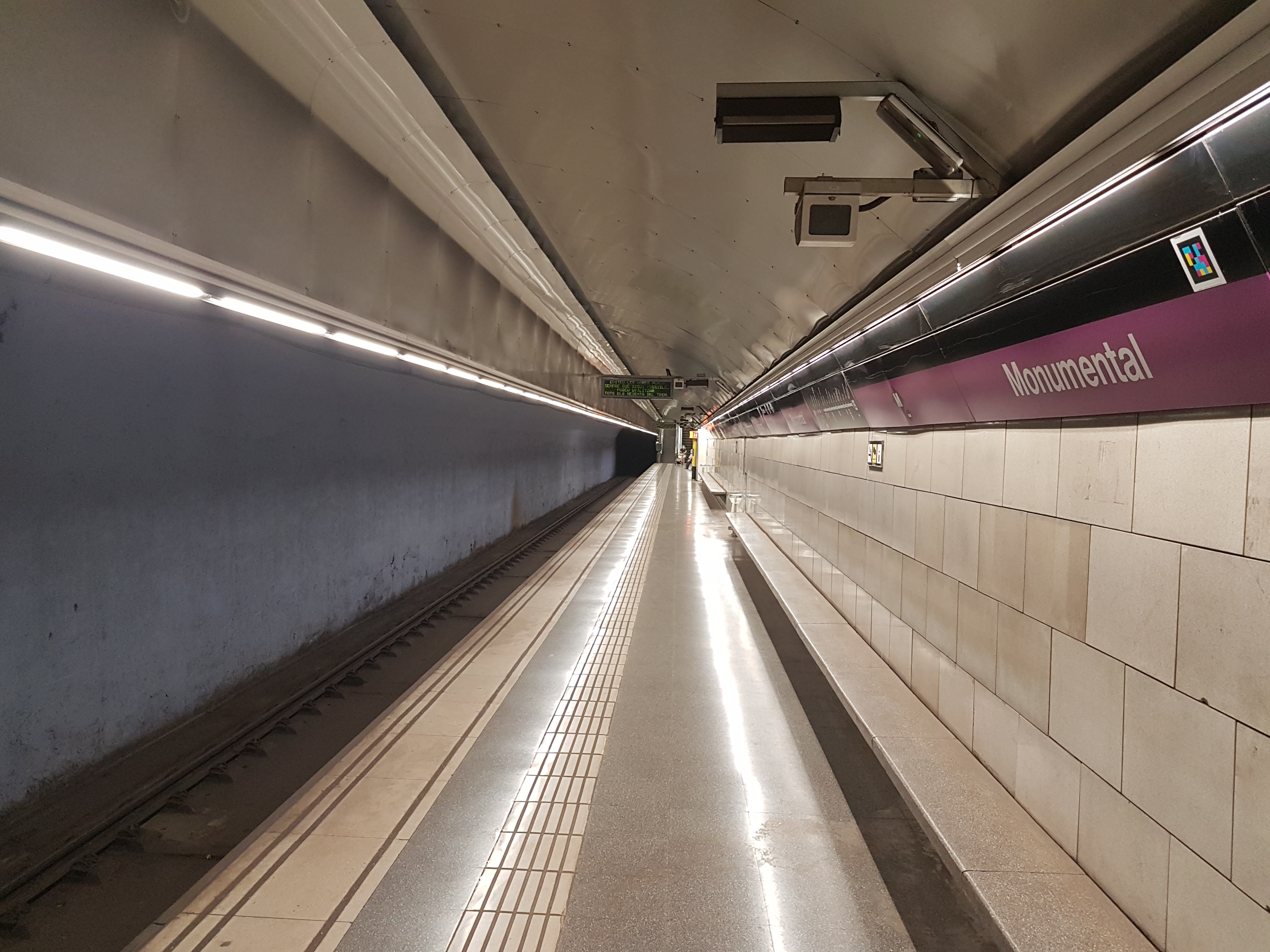

General information
- Location: Barcelona (Eixample)
- Coordinates: 41°24′02″N 2°10′46″E
- System: Barcelona Metro rapid transit station Trambesòs tram stop
- Operator: Transports Metropolitans de Barcelona; TramMet

Other information
- Fare zone: 1 (ATM)

History
- Opened: 1995 (Line 2); 2024 (Tram)

Services
| Preceding station | Metro | Following station |
|---|---|---|
| Tetuan towards Paral·lel | L2 | Sagrada Família towards Badalona Pompeu Fabra |
Location
- Location within Barcelona

Monumental (Catalan pronunciation: [munumənˈtal]) is a station on Line 2 of the Barcelona Metro and line T4 of the Trambesòs network. It is named after the nearby La Monumental bullring and located in Fort Pienc, a neighborhood of the Eixample district.

The connection between the Metro and Tram stations consists of a short walk on the street.

== Location ==
The Line 2 metro station is located in the Fort Pienc neighborhood of the Eixample district of Barcelona. The station is underground, with the platforms located below Carrer de la Marina, between Carrer del Consell de Cent and Carrer de la Diputació. There are two accesses, one on each sidewalk of Carrer de la Marina. The La Monumental bullring, after which the station is named, is located just a few meters away.

The tram platforms are located in Avinguda Diagonal, between the streets of Lepant and Padilla.

== History ==
The station opened in September 25, 1995 with the other stations of Line 2's initial section between Sant Antoni and Sagrada Família.

On November 10, 2024, the Tram stop was inaugurated as part of the Trambesòs extension along Avinguda Diagonal. It is served by line T4, with Monumental located between Glòries and Sicília.

== Gallery ==
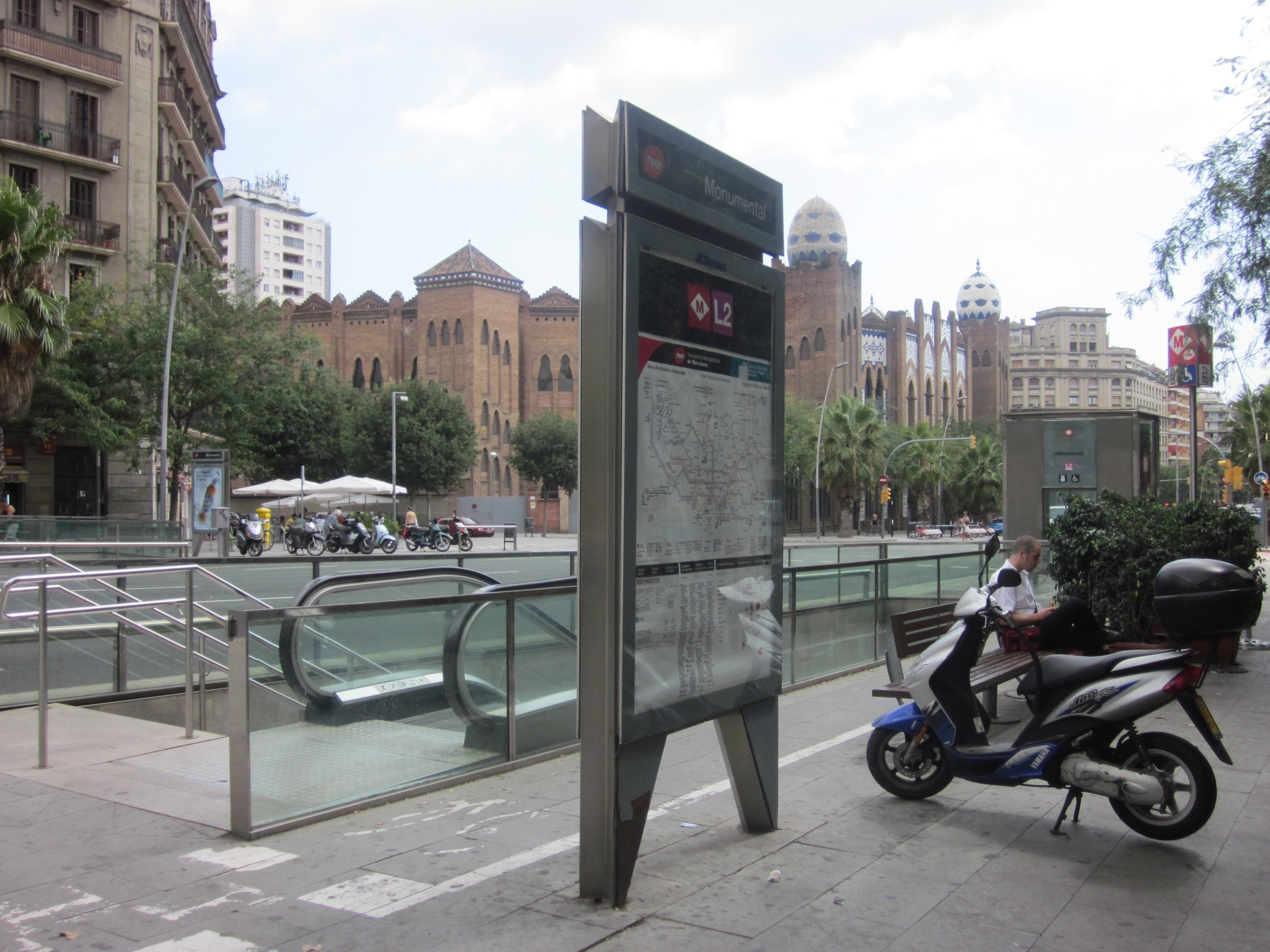
One of the station's accesses in Carrer de la Marina

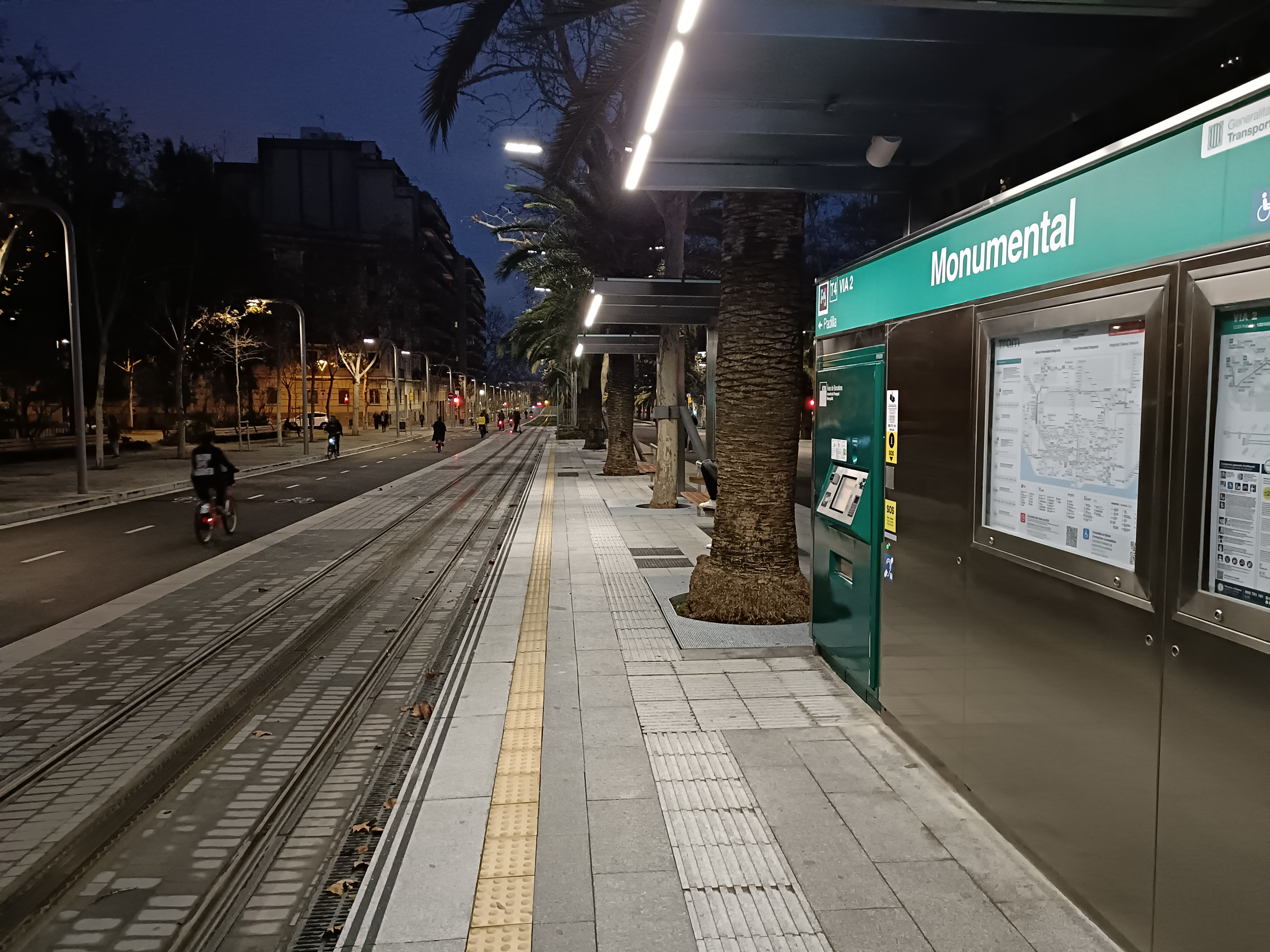
One of the Trambesòs platforms

== Services ==
| Preceding station | Metro | Following station |
|---|---|---|
| Tetuan towards Paral·lel | L2 | Sagrada Família towards Badalona Pompeu Fabra |

== See also ==
- List of Barcelona Metro stations
- List of tram stops in Barcelona metropolitan area
- Barcelona Metro line 2
