= Sagrada Família station =

Metro station in Spain

Sagrada Família
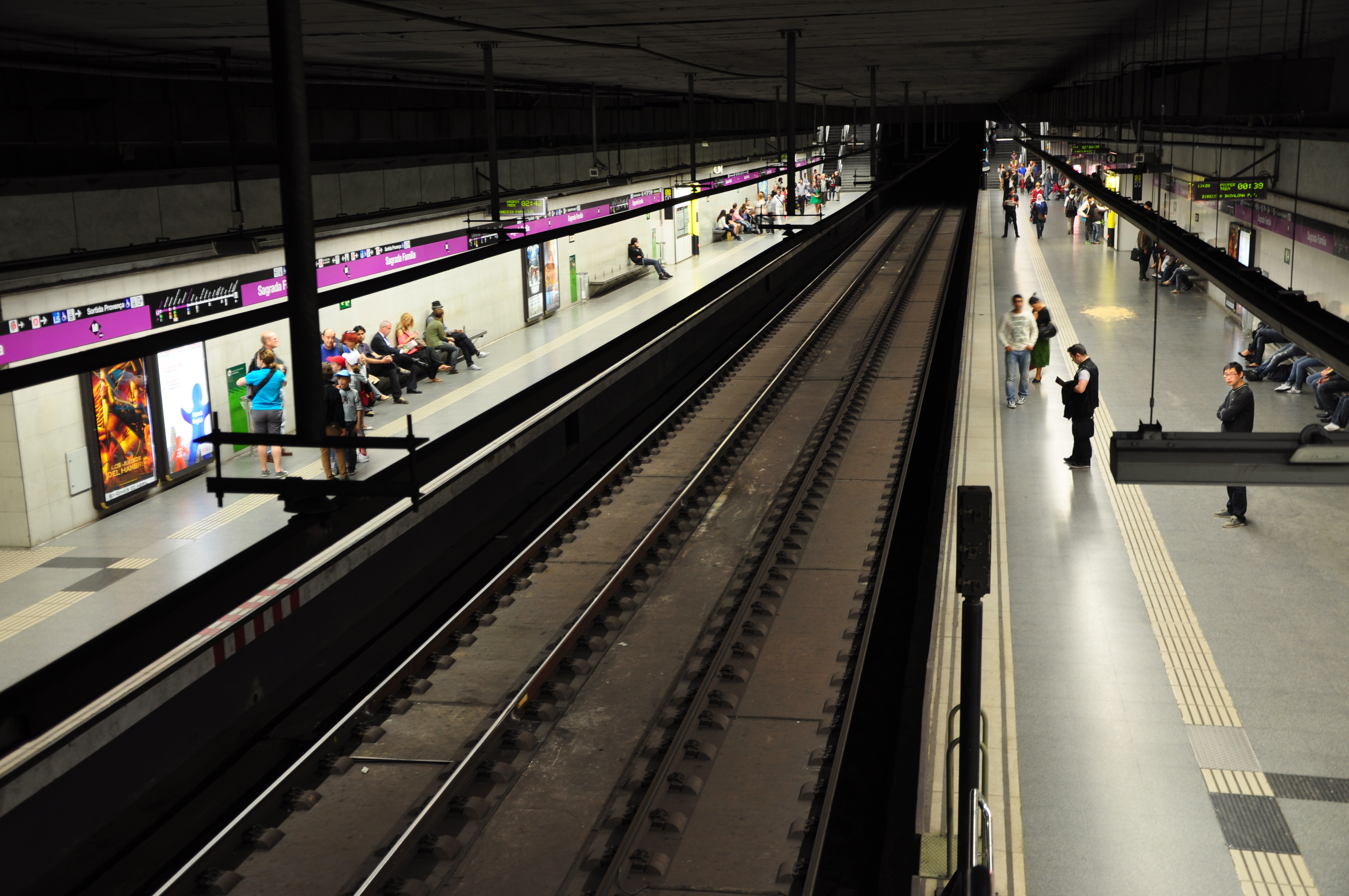
- The station's L2 platforms

General information
- Location: Barcelona (Eixample)
- Coordinates: 41°24′16.3″N 2°10′28.17″E
- System: Barcelona Metro rapid transit station
- Owner: TMB
- Operator: TMB

Construction
- Accessible: yes

Other information
- Fare zone: 1 (ATM)

History
- Opened: 1970

Services
Preceding station	Metro	Following station
Monumental towards Paral·lel	L2	Encants towards Badalona Pompeu Fabra
Verdaguer towards Cornellà Centre	L5	Sant Pau | Dos de Maig towards Vall d'Hebron
Location
- Location within Barcelona Location within Province of Barcelona Location within Spain

Sagrada Família (Catalan pronunciation: [səˈɣɾaðə fəˈmili.ə]) is a metro station in Barcelona Metro network. It is named after the famous, and adjacent, Basílica i Temple Expiatori de la Sagrada Família, a church first designed by architect Antoni Gaudí and still under construction. It is served by TMB-operated Barcelona Metro lines L2 and L5.

The station takes the form of two separate sections linked by a corridor within the paid area of the station complex. Both sections also have their own street entrances:

- The L2 section is located under Marina street, between Mallorca and Provença streets and has two accesses, one at each side of the station. The upper level has two halls. The trains run on the lower level that has two platforms, one bigger than the other one.
- The L5 section is located under Provença street, between Sardenya and Marina streets. The upper level has two halls and is equipped with a TMB Information Center and commercial areas. The trains run on the lower level.

The L5 section of the station was the first to open, with the opening, in 1970, of the line between Diagonal and Sagrera. The L2 section followed in 1995, with the opening of the line between Sant Antoni and this station.

== Gallery ==
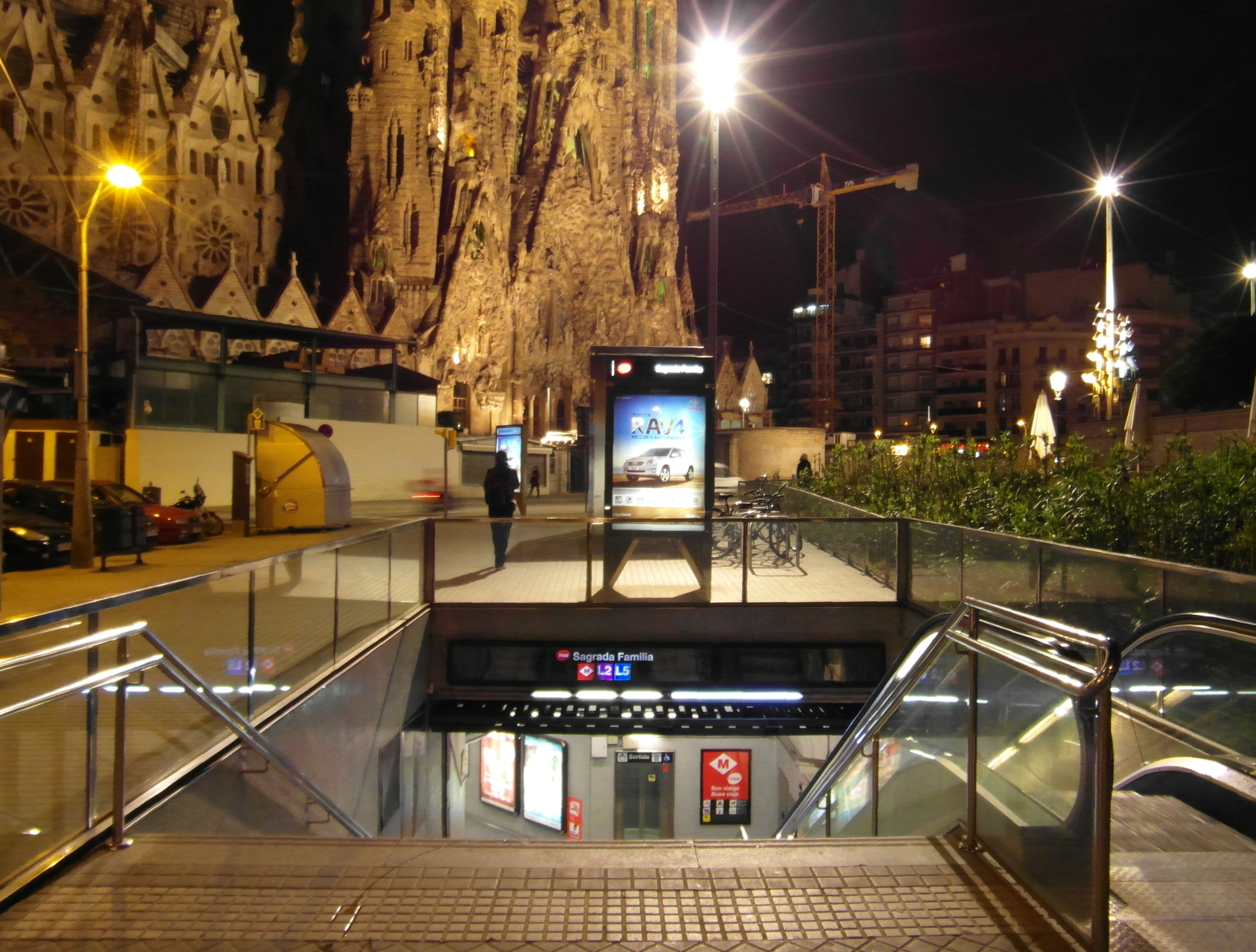
Station entrance, with the eponymous church in the background

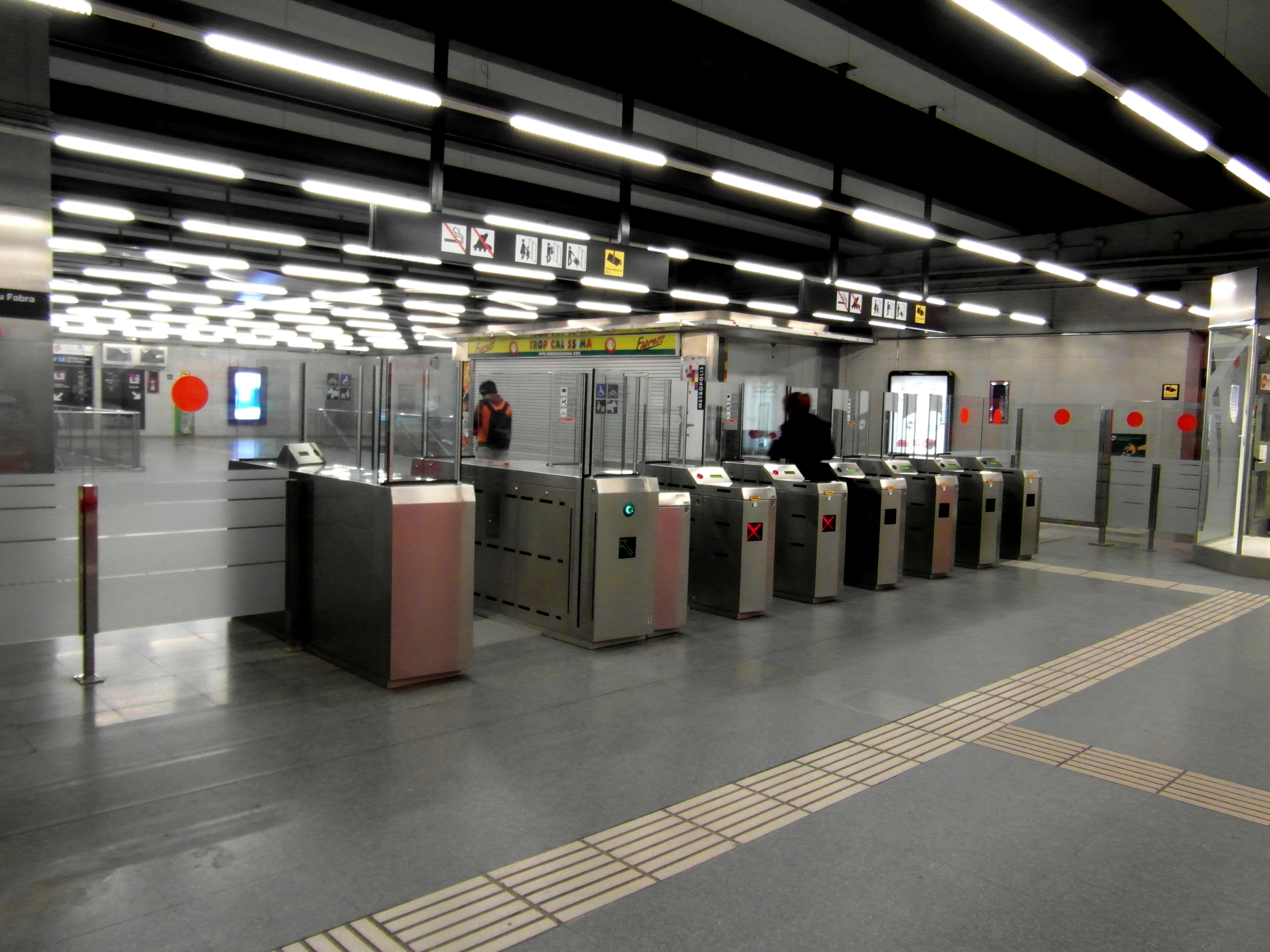
The station's ticket hall

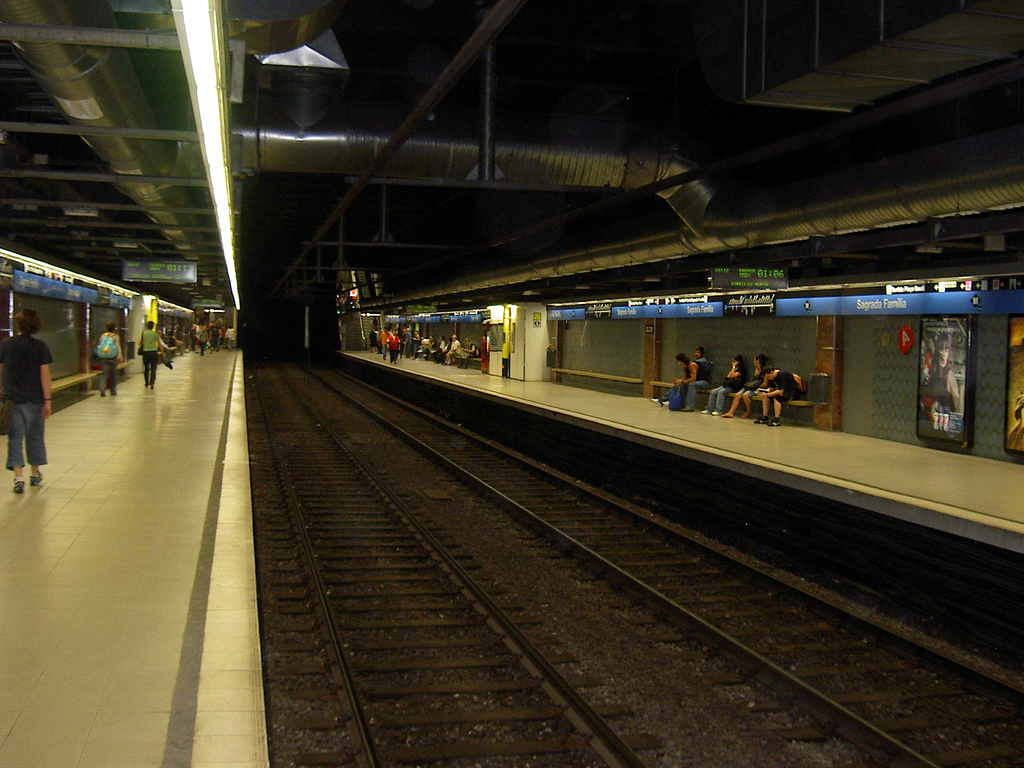
The station's line L5 platforms

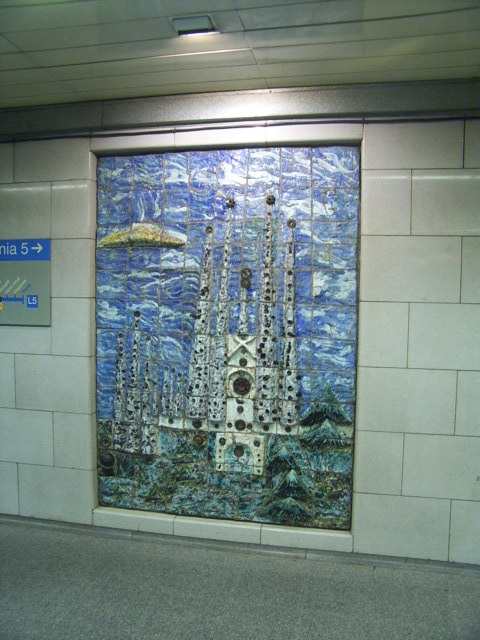
Mosaic in the station depicting the church

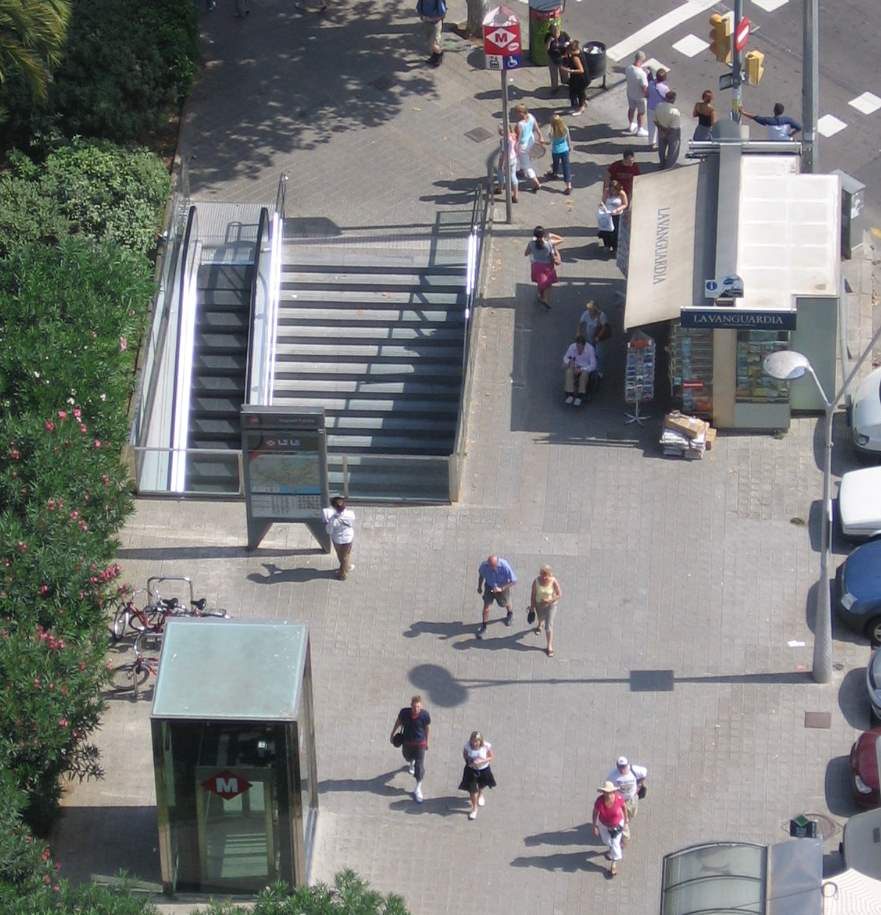
Entrance to the station, seen from the church
