= Sant Antoni, Barcelona =

Human settlement in Eixample, Barcelona, Catalonia, Spain

Coordinates: 41.377778°N 2.161111°E

Sant Antoni
- Neighborhood of Barcelona
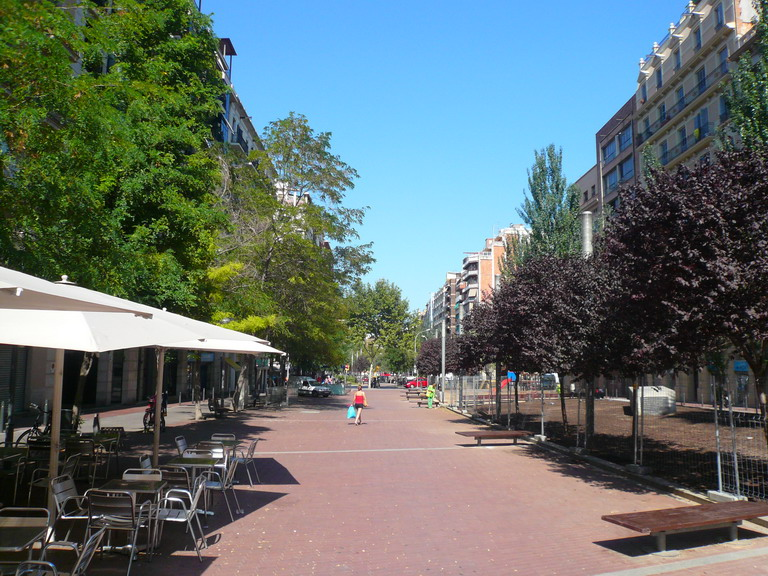
- Avinguda de Mistral, the central thoroughfare
- Interactive map of Sant Antoni
- Country: Spain
- Autonomous community: Catalonia
- Province: Barcelona
- Comarca: Barcelonès
- Municipality: Barcelona
- District: Eixample

Area
  - Total: 0.801 km^{2} (0.309 sq mi)

Population
  - Total: 38,182
  - Density: 47,700/km^{2} (123,000/sq mi)
- Demonym(s): santantonienc, -a

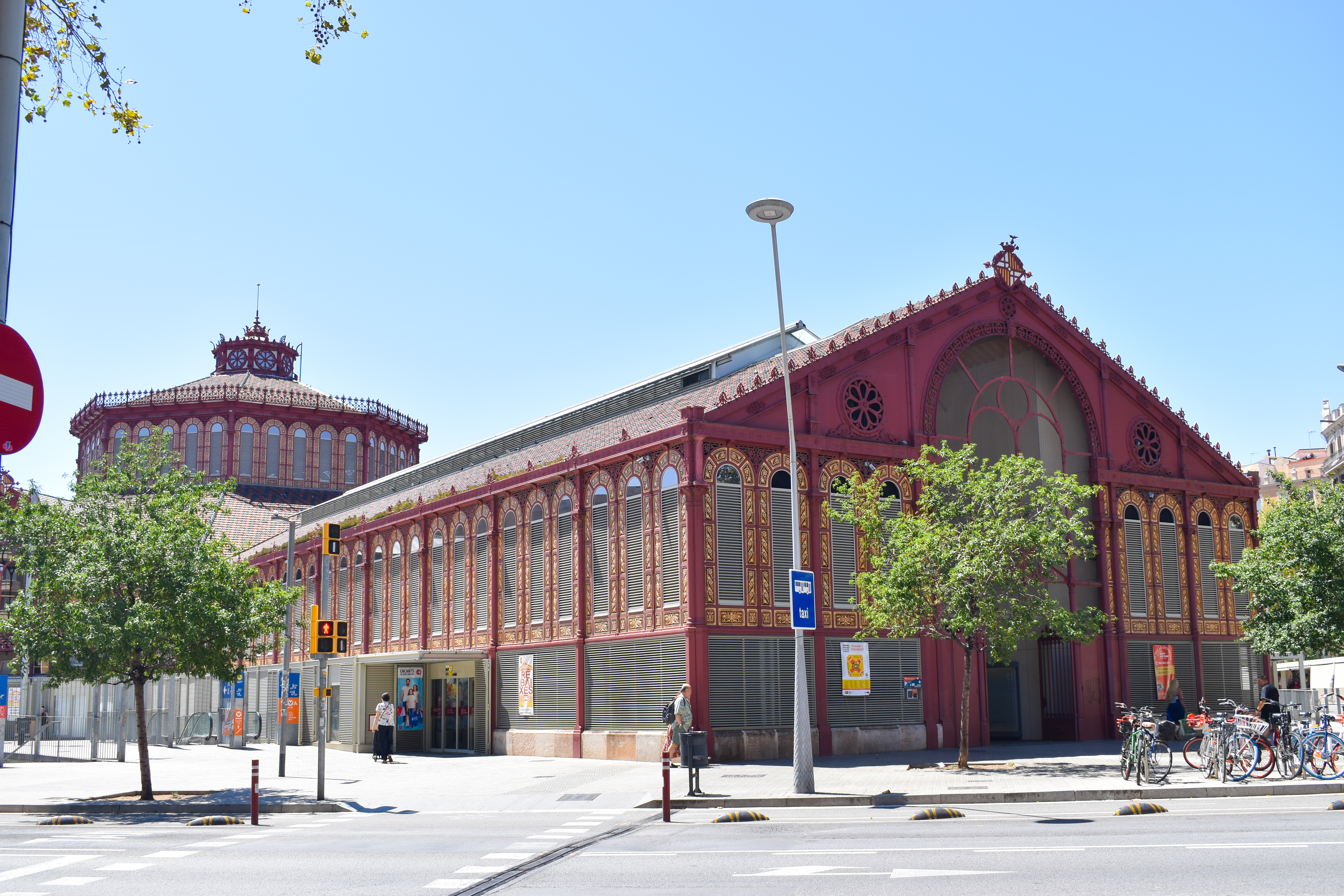
Mercat de Sant Antoni.

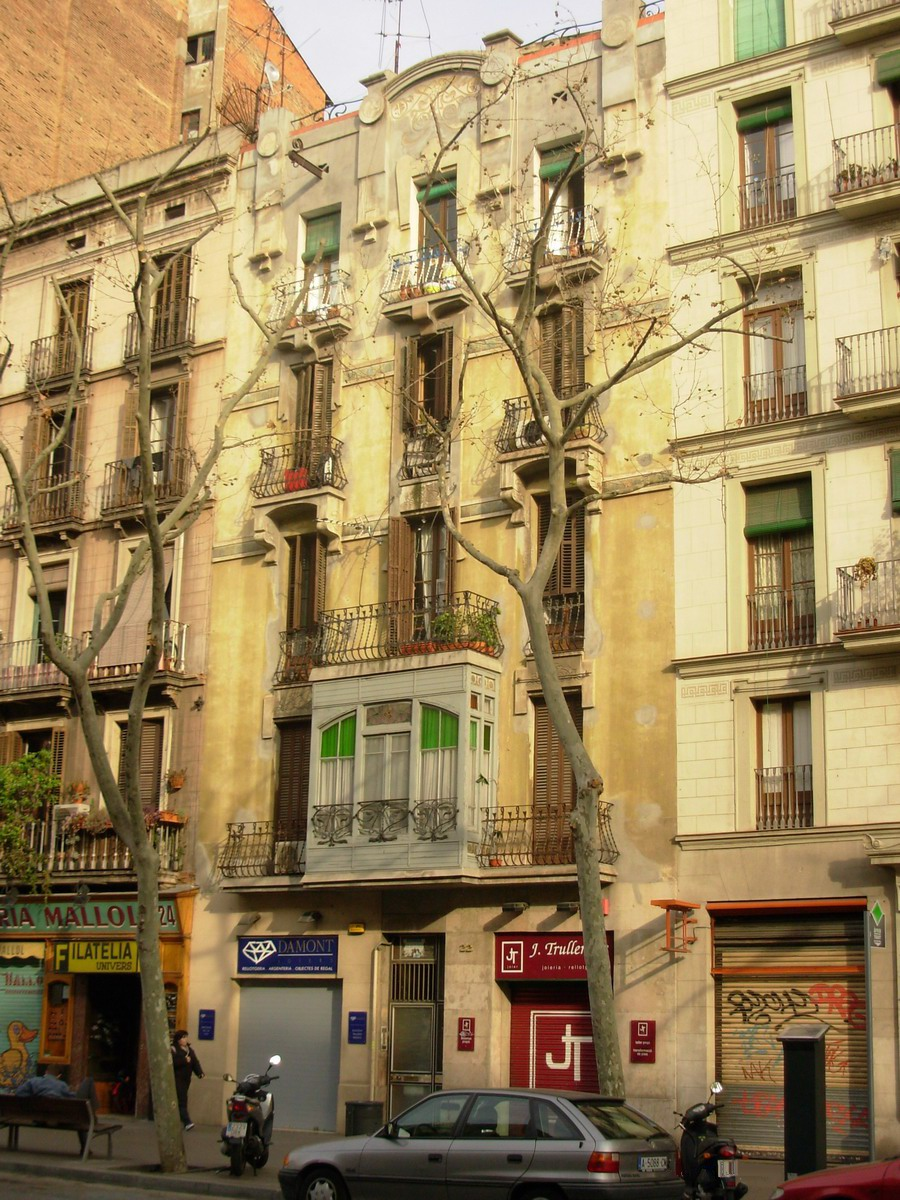
Ronda de Sant Antoni.

Sant Antoni (Catalan pronunciation: [ˌsant ənˈtɔni]) is a neighborhood in the Eixample district of Barcelona, Catalonia (Spain). Its non-official centre, the marketplace of the same name—designed by Antoni Rovira i Trias and built between 1872 and 1882—is one of the oldest and most popular in the city, especially with the secondhand book stalls that surround the building Sunday mornings. It is bordered by the neighbourhoods of the L'Antiga Esquerra de l'Eixample (on the other side of Gran Via de les Corts Catalanes), the Raval (on the other side of Ronda de Sant Antoni), and Poble Sec (on the other side of Avinguda del Paral·lel). The streets of Sant Antoni follow the grid pattern prevalent in all of Eixample, except for a central thoroughfare, the Avinguda de Mistral, built on the site of an important medieval road which led out of Barcelona. Another well-known landmark of Sant Antoni is the bar called Els Tres Tombs, right next to the market.

== History ==
Although its origins are tied to the now-disappeared Church of Saint Anthony (in Catalan: Sant Antoni) in the Raval, the development of the neighbourhood dates from the 1880s onwards, as Barcelona expanded beyond its former medieval walls. Very few houses stood around the market when it was built, and most buildings visible today in Sant Antoni date from the 1920s and 1930s, when major urban changes occurred in the city on the occasion of the 1929 International Exposition. A working-class area during most of the 20th century, it has undergone important changes since then As with many other neighbourhoods in central Barcelona, some gentrification has taken place in Sant Antoni since the 1980s and prostitution has mostly relocated since. Nowadays it is one of the quietest areas in the city centre, with 37,878 inhabitants in the 2005 census. In the meantime, this Ronda Sant Antoni has become pedestrianised.

== Places of worship ==
=== Catholic ===
- Sant Ferran (Gran Via de les Corts Catalanes - Vilamarí)
- Preciossíssima Sang de Nostre Senyor Jesucrist (Viladomat - Floridablanca)
- Maria Auxiliadora i Sant Josep (Sepúlveda - Calàbria)

=== Evangelist ===
- Evangelist Church of Sant Antoni (Mistral)

=== Jehovah's Witnesses ===
- Sant Antoni Kingdom Hall (Passatge de Sant Antoni)

== Transport ==
- Barcelona Metro stations Sant Antoni (on L2), Urgell (on L1), and Poble Sec (on L3).

== Notable residents ==
- Daniel Sirera (born 1967), chairman of the People's Party

== See also ==
- Moritz Beer
