= Plaça de Tetuan, Barcelona =

Square in Barcelona, Spain

Coordinates: 41.394921°N 2.175507°E

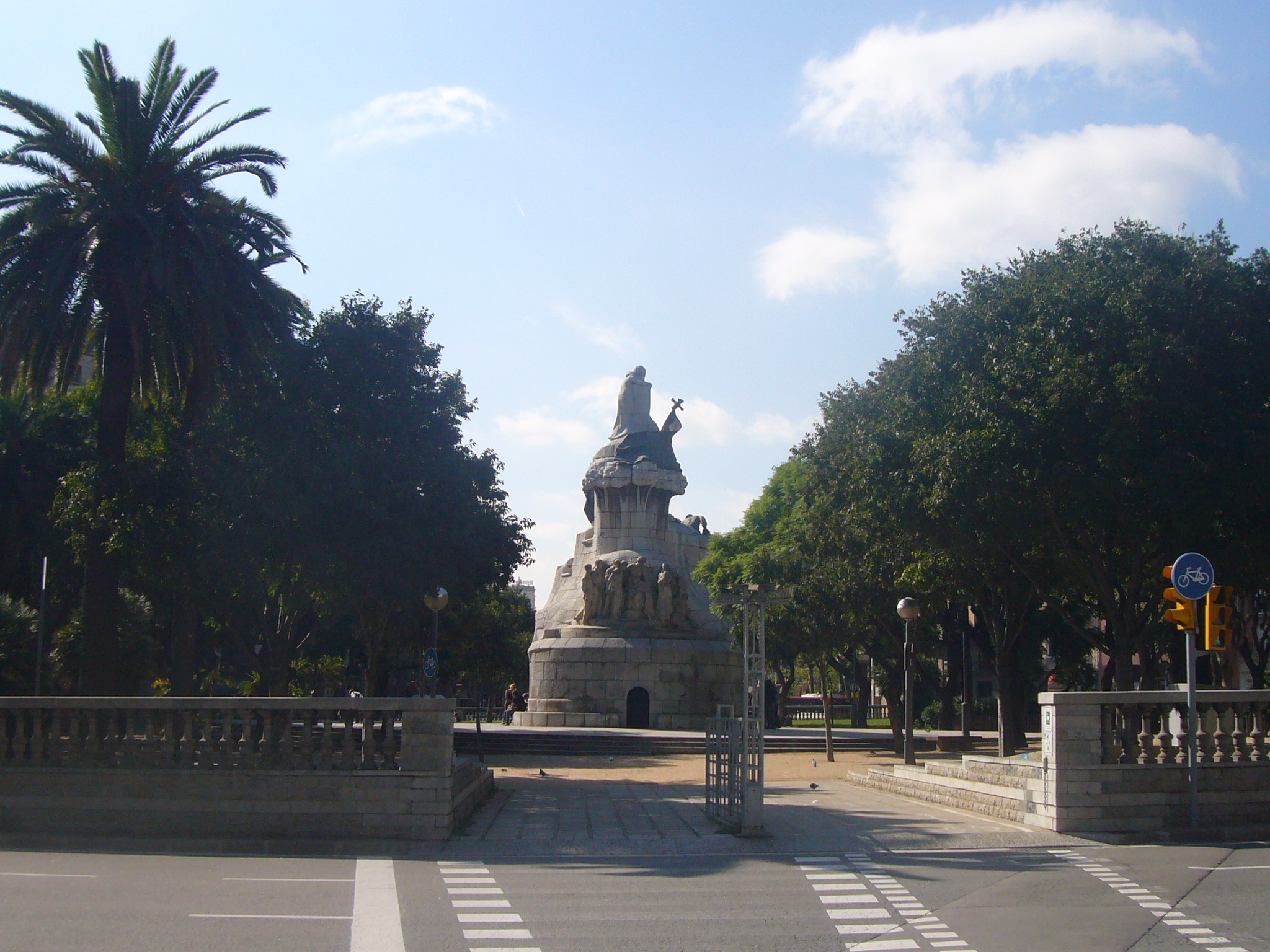
Plaça de Tetuan

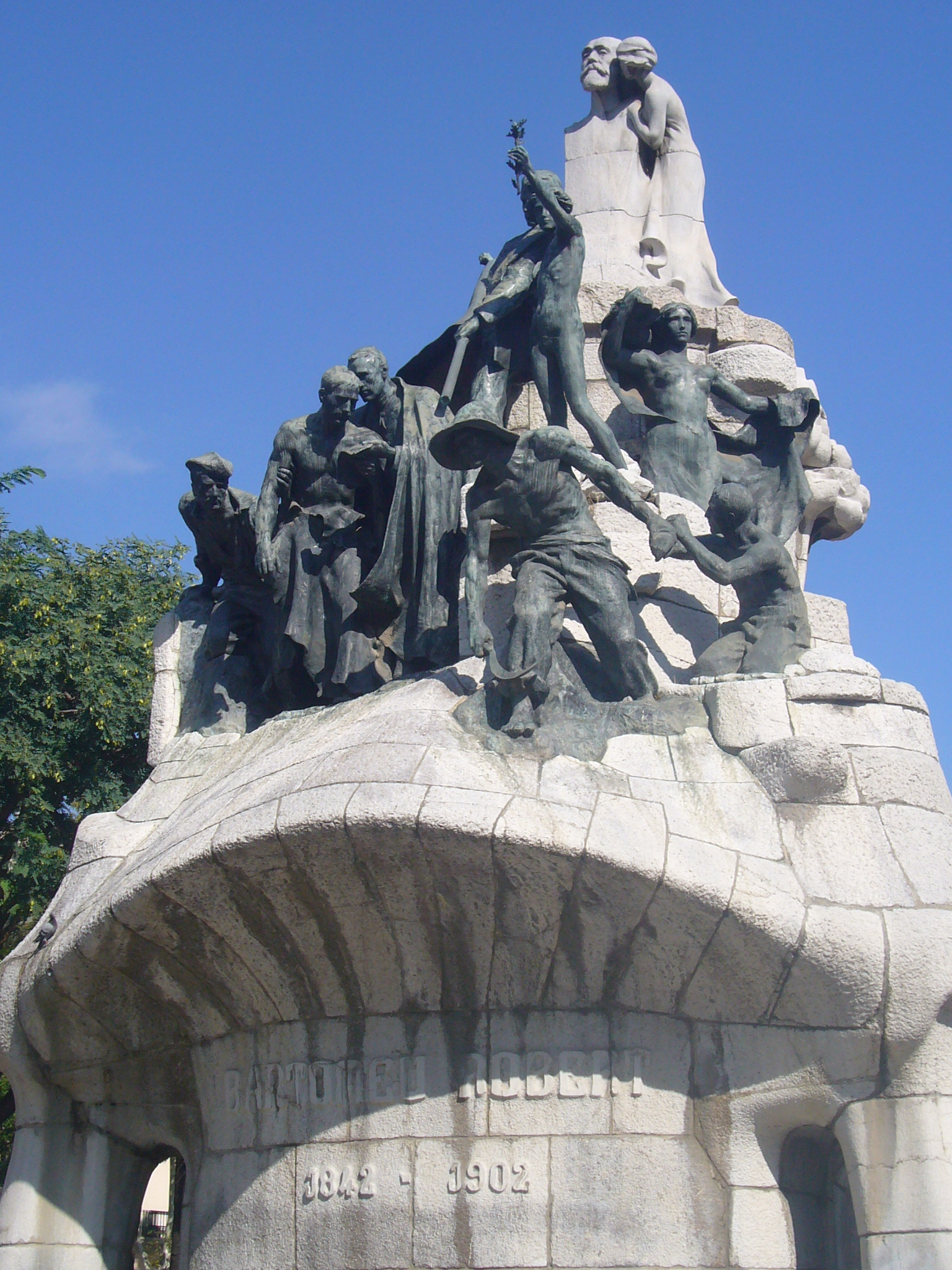
Memorial for Bartomeu Robert

Plaça de Tetuan (Catalan pronunciation: [ˈplasə ðə tətuˈan]), known in Spanish as Plaza de Tetuán, is a major square in Barcelona. It is in Fort Pienc, in the central district of Eixample, at the busy intersection of Gran Via de les Corts Catalanes and Passeig de Sant Joan. The square is named after the 1860 Battle of Tétouan, the siege and occupation of the Moroccan city of Tetuan by general Joan Prim and Catalan volunteers. It was formerly called Hermenegildo Giner de los Ríos.

== Doctor Robert monument ==
The square's central area contains the Doctor Robert monument by the sculptor Josep Llimona. Robert was a professor of internal pathology at the University of Barcelona. He was appointed mayor of Barcelona in 1899 and elected to the Spanish Parliament in 1901.

The monument was built in Plaça de la Universitat between 1904 and 1910, commissioned by mayor Lluís Domènech i Montaner. The monument was dismantled in 1940 by the Francoist State and moved to Plaça de Tetuan in 1985.

== Transport ==
=== Barcelona Metro ===
The station Tetuan is served by Barcelona Metro line L2 (purple).

== See also ==
- List of streets and squares in Eixample
- Urban planning of Barcelona
