= Arcos de Zapopan metro station =

Railway station in Zapopan, Mexico

Arcos de Zapopan
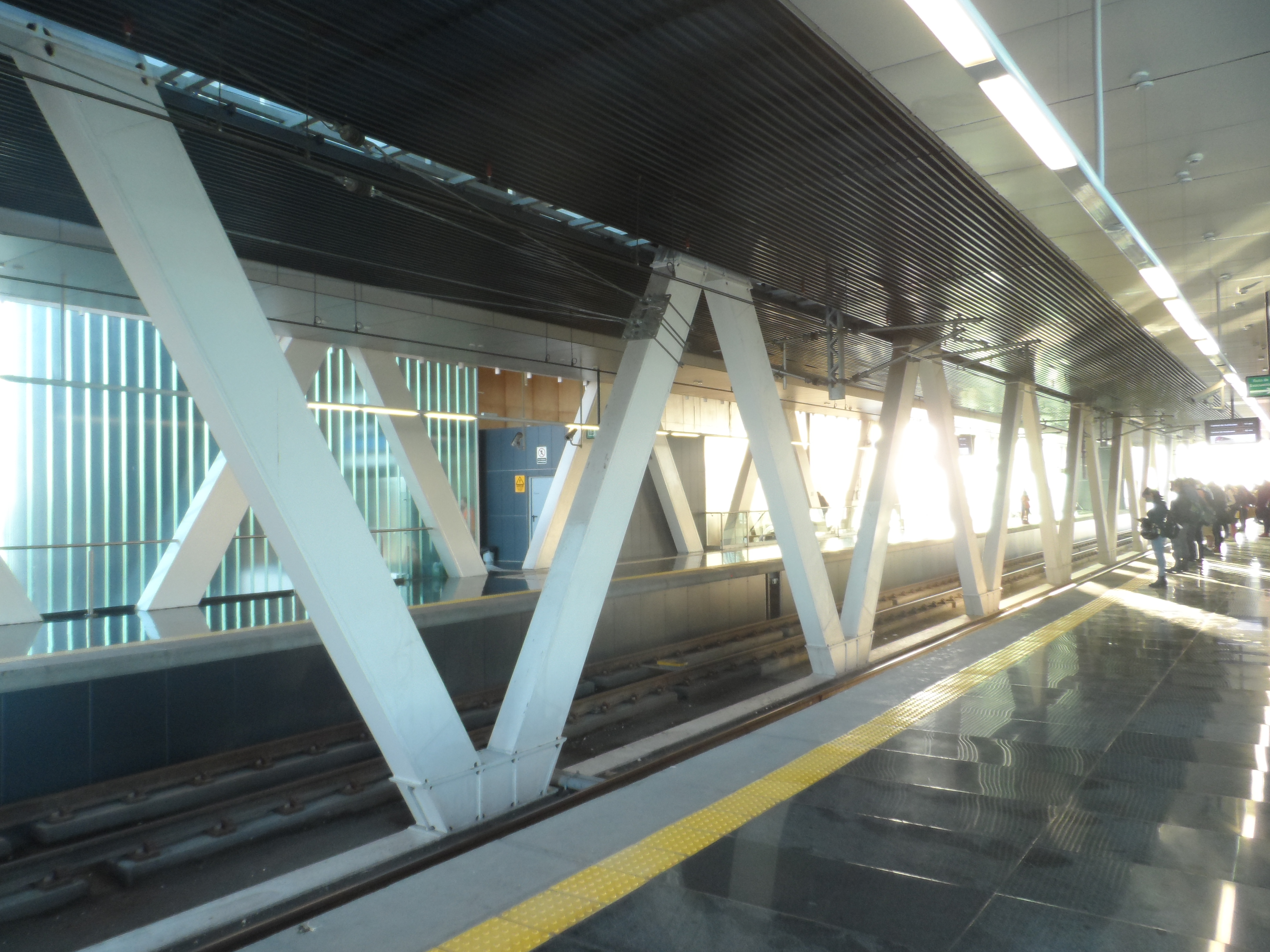
- Platforms of the Arcos de Zapopan station.

General information
- Location: Zapopan; Jalisco, Mexico
- Coordinates: 20°44′28″N 103°24′26″W
- System: SITEUR light rail
- Line: 3
- Platforms: 2 side platforms
- Tracks: 2

Construction
- Structure type: Elevated
- Cycle facilities: Yes
- Accessible: Yes

History
- Opened: September 12, 2020

Services
Preceding station	Sistema de Tren Eléctrico Urbano	Following station
Terminus	Line 3	Periférico Belenes towards Central de Autobuses
Location

Arcos de Zapopan is the eighteenth station of Line 3 of the SITEUR of Guadalajara from south-east to north-west, and the first in the opposite direction. This station is the north-west terminal of the line, as well as the first elevated station of the Guadalajara-Zapopan viaduct.

This station is located on the crossing of Juan Gil Preciado Av. (Road to Tesistán) with Arco del Triunfo Av. from the Colonia Arcos de Zapopan. When Line 3 was under construction, this station was named Periférico Tesistán, but it was changed by popular request of by local residents, since the next station (Periférico Belenes) is closer to the peripheral roadway than the terminal station. Its logotype is a cob, which represents that there were large corn crops around the place, crops that started disappearing with the growth of the city. The station serves the nearby Our Lady of Altagracia Parish.

== Points of interest ==
- La Cima Mall.
- Preparatory Nº. 7 of U. de G. in the Colonia Tuzanía.
- Parish of Nuestra Señora Caridad del Cobre.
- Arcos de Zapopan INE module.
- Parish La Divina Providencia in Arcos de Zapopan.
- La Estrella park.

== Gallery ==
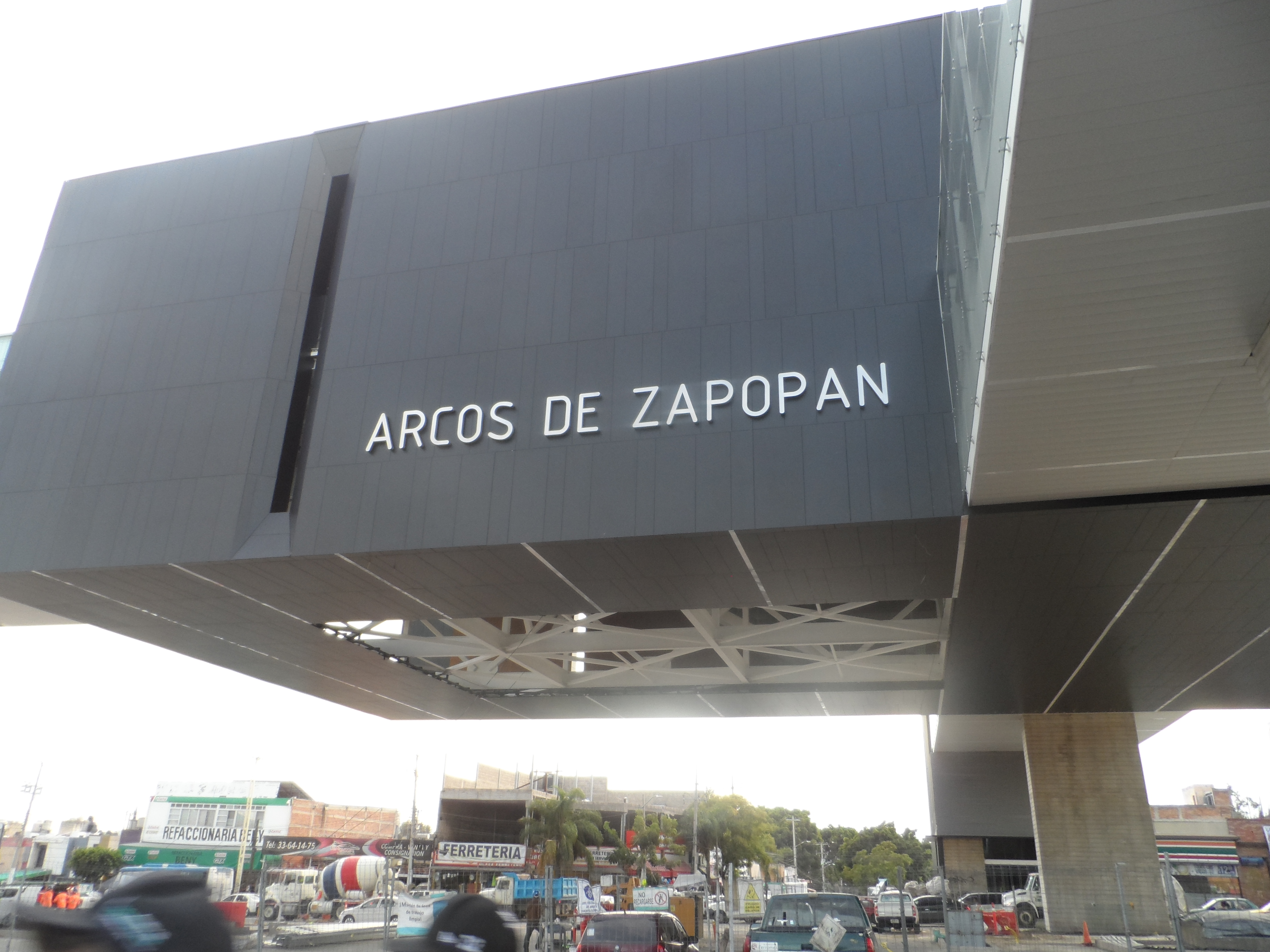
External view of the Arcos de Zapopan station

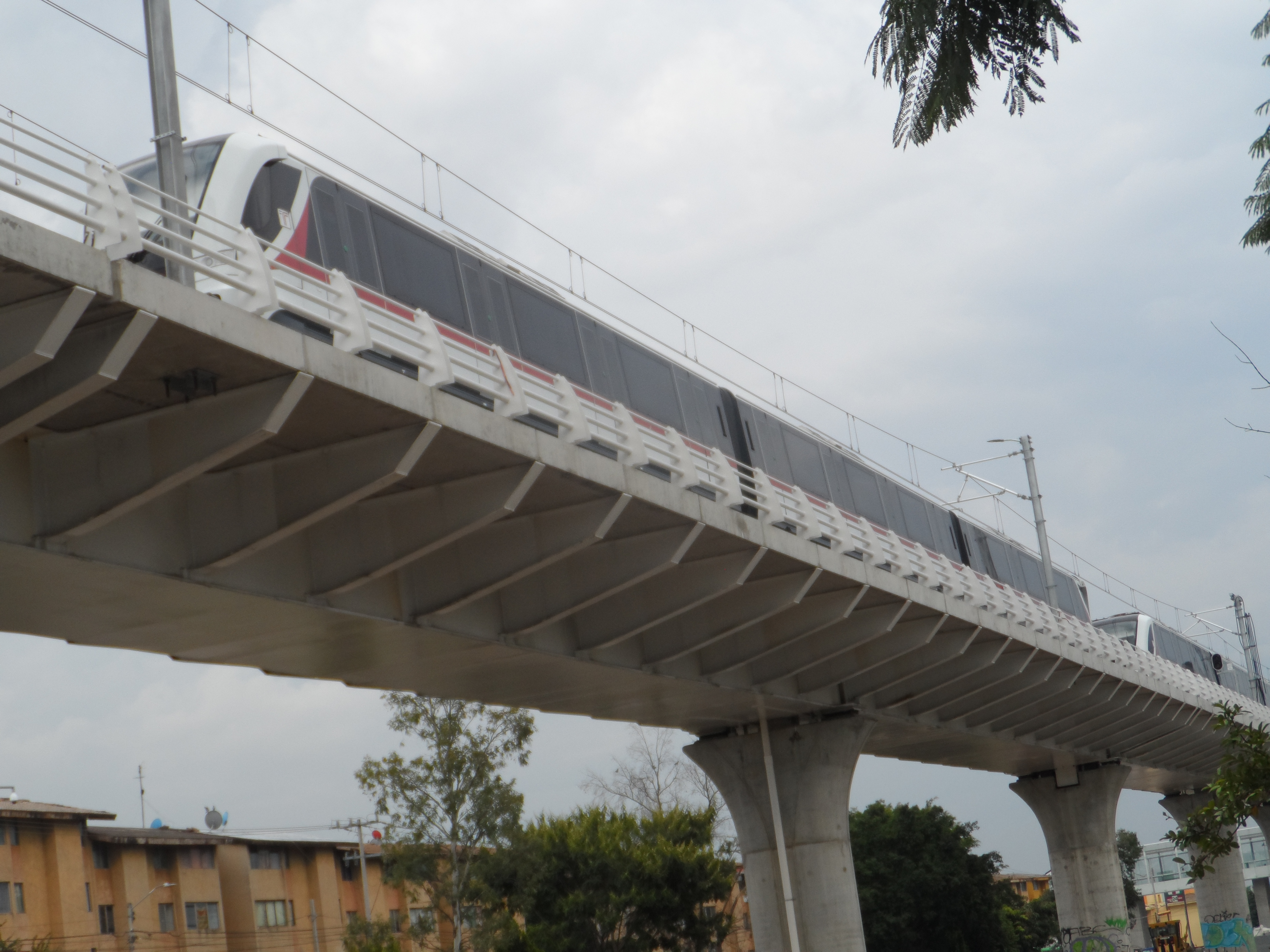
Metrópolis 9000 trains parked near the Arcos de Zapopan station
