= Route 13 =

Route 13 may refer to:

- One of several highways - see List of highways numbered 13
- One of several public transport routes - see List of public transport routes numbered 13
