= Tetuan station (Barcelona) =

Metro station in Barcelona, Spain

Coordinates: 41.395°N 2.176°E

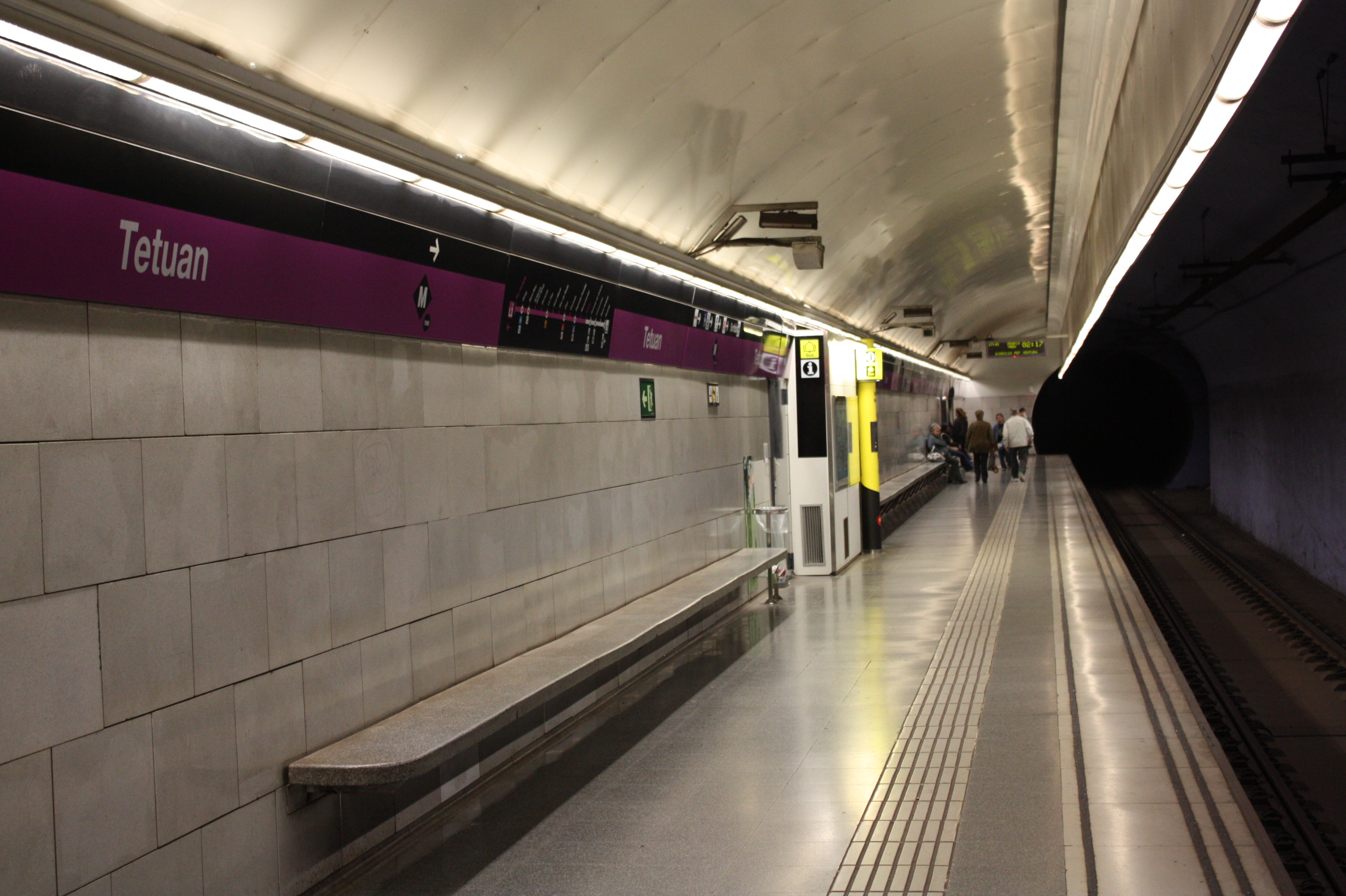
One of the L2 platforms of the station

Tetuan (Catalan pronunciation: [tətuˈan]) is a station on the L2 line of the Barcelona metro network, located below Gran Via de les Corts Catalanes and Plaça de Tetuan in the Eixample district in central Barcelona. It was opened in 1995, along several other stations on the line. The station can be accessed from the entrances located on Carrer de Casp-Passeig de Sant Joan and Carrer de la Diputació-Passeig de Sant Joan.

== Services ==
Preceding station	Metro	Following station
Passeig de Gràcia towards Paral·lel	L2	Monumental towards Badalona Pompeu Fabra

== See also ==
- List of Barcelona Metro stations
