= Fort Pienc =

Neighborhood in Barcelona, Catalonia, Spain

Coordinates: 41°23′44.43″N 2°11′1.33″E

- Neighborhood of Barcelona
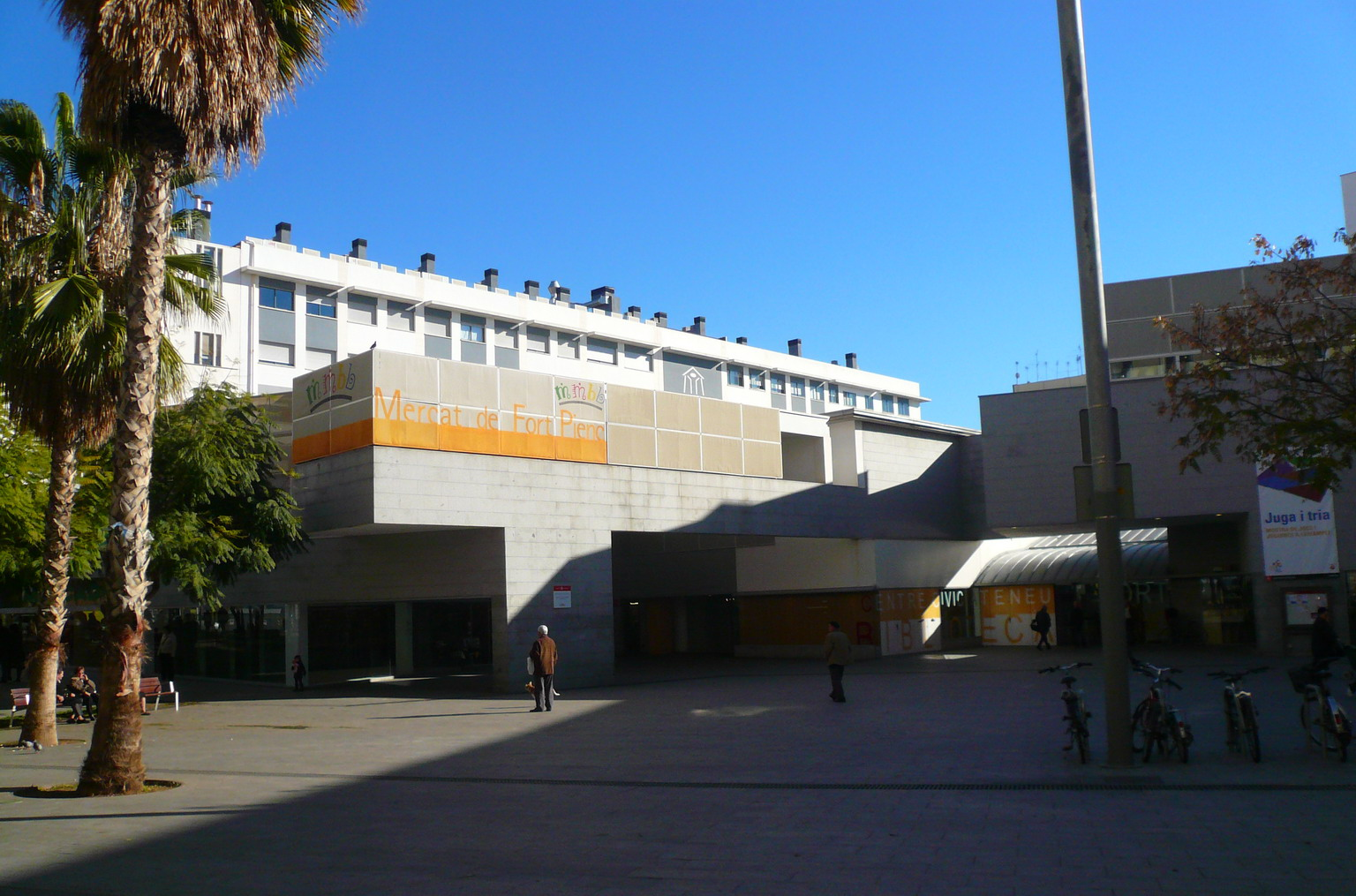
- Fort Pienc market, also home to a library
- Interactive map of Fort Pienc
- Country: Spain
- Autonomous community: Catalonia
- Province: Barcelona
- Comarca: Barcelonès
- Municipality: Barcelona
- District: Eixample

Area
  - Total: 0.929 km^{2} (0.359 sq mi)

Population
  - Total: 31,693
  - Density: 34,100/km^{2} (88,400/sq mi)
- Demonym(s): fortpienc, -a

Fort Pienc (Catalan pronunciation: [ˈfɔrt piˈɛŋ(k)]) is a neighborhood in the Eixample district of Barcelona, Catalonia, Spain. Its name stems from a former military fortification which existed there until the 19th century called Fort Pius, Pienc is an adjective in Catalan meaning related to the name Pius. There has been a strong Chinese presence in the area since the 2000s. The Arc de Triomf is the main attraction in the area, located in Passeig de Lluís Companys-Passeig de Sant Joan, while L'Auditori is an important concert hall. The National Theatre of Catalonia is another of its cultural centres, as is the General Archive of the Crown of Aragon, near Parc de l'Estació del Nord. The General Catalana de Electricidad building is a fine piece of modernisme or local Art Nouveau architecture. La Monumental is the only extant bullring in the city.

== Transport ==
- Arc de Triomf, a Barcelona Metro station on line L1, and an important Rodalies Barcelona commuter station.
- Tetuan and Monumental stations are served by L2.
- Estació del Nord, the city's main coach station.
