= Pep Ventura station =

Metro station in Barcelona, Spain

Coordinates: 41°26′39″N 2°14′17″E

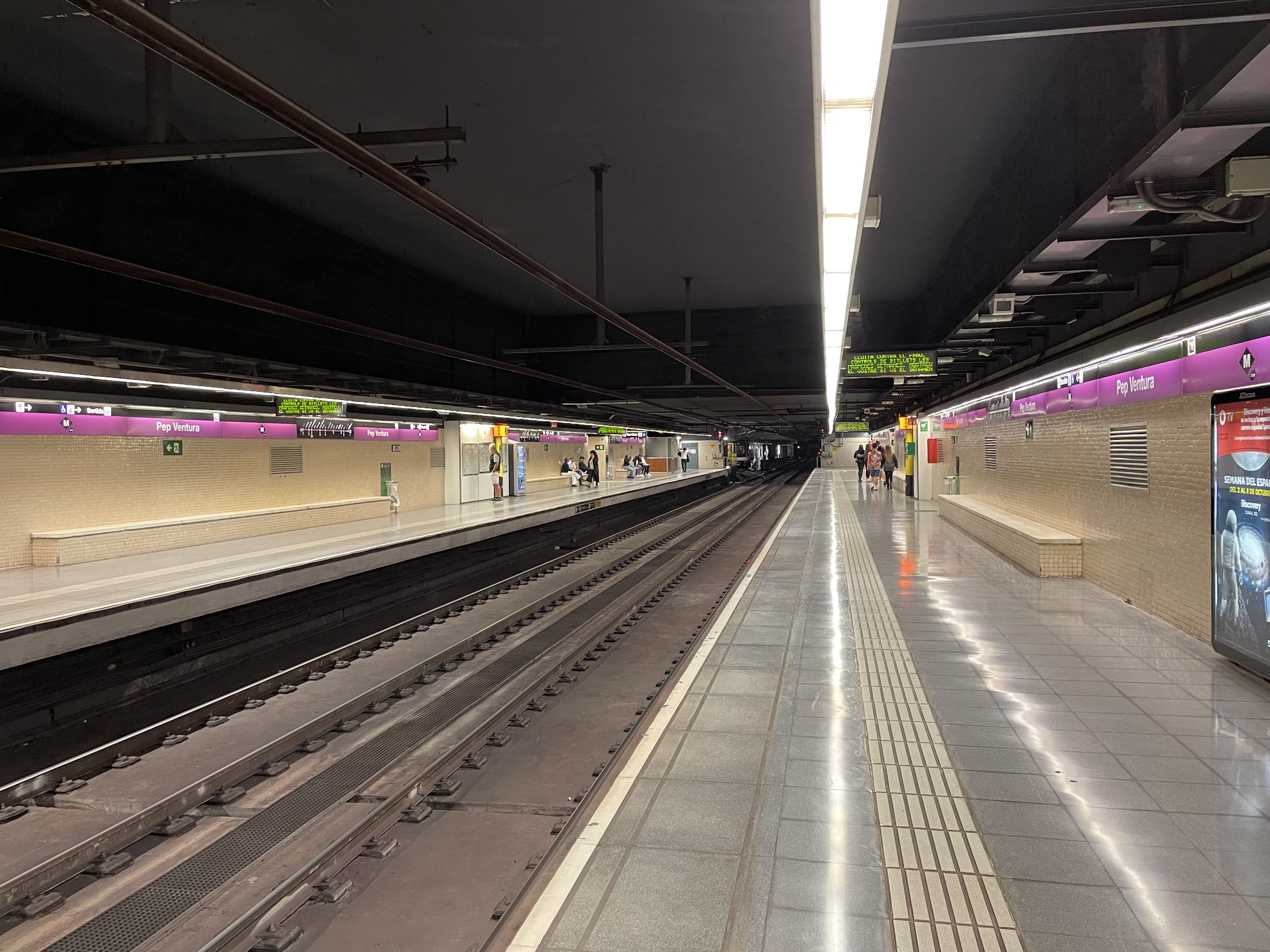
Pep Ventura Station October 2023

Pep Ventura (Catalan pronunciation: [ˈpeb bənˈtuɾə]) is the name of a Barcelona metro station located in the municipality of Badalona, in the metropolitan area of Barcelona, and served by L2. It was the northern terminus of that line until 2010, when it was extended into the town centre and into the station Badalona Pompeu Fabra.

It was opened in 1985, then as part of L4, which had been extended to there from La Pau. In 2002, though, that branch became part of L2. This station is located under Avinguda del Marquès de Mont-roig, next to Plaça Pep Ventura, in Badalona.

== Name ==
The station was named after musician Josep Maria "Pep" Ventura (1819–1875), called "the father of the sardana", the national dance of Catalonia.

== Services ==
| Preceding station | Metro | Following station |
|---|---|---|
| Gorg towards Paral·lel | L2 | Badalona Pompeu Fabra Terminus |
