= Avinguda del Paral·lel =

Thoroughfare in Barcelona, Spain

Coordinates: 41°22′29.88″N 2°9′46.99″E

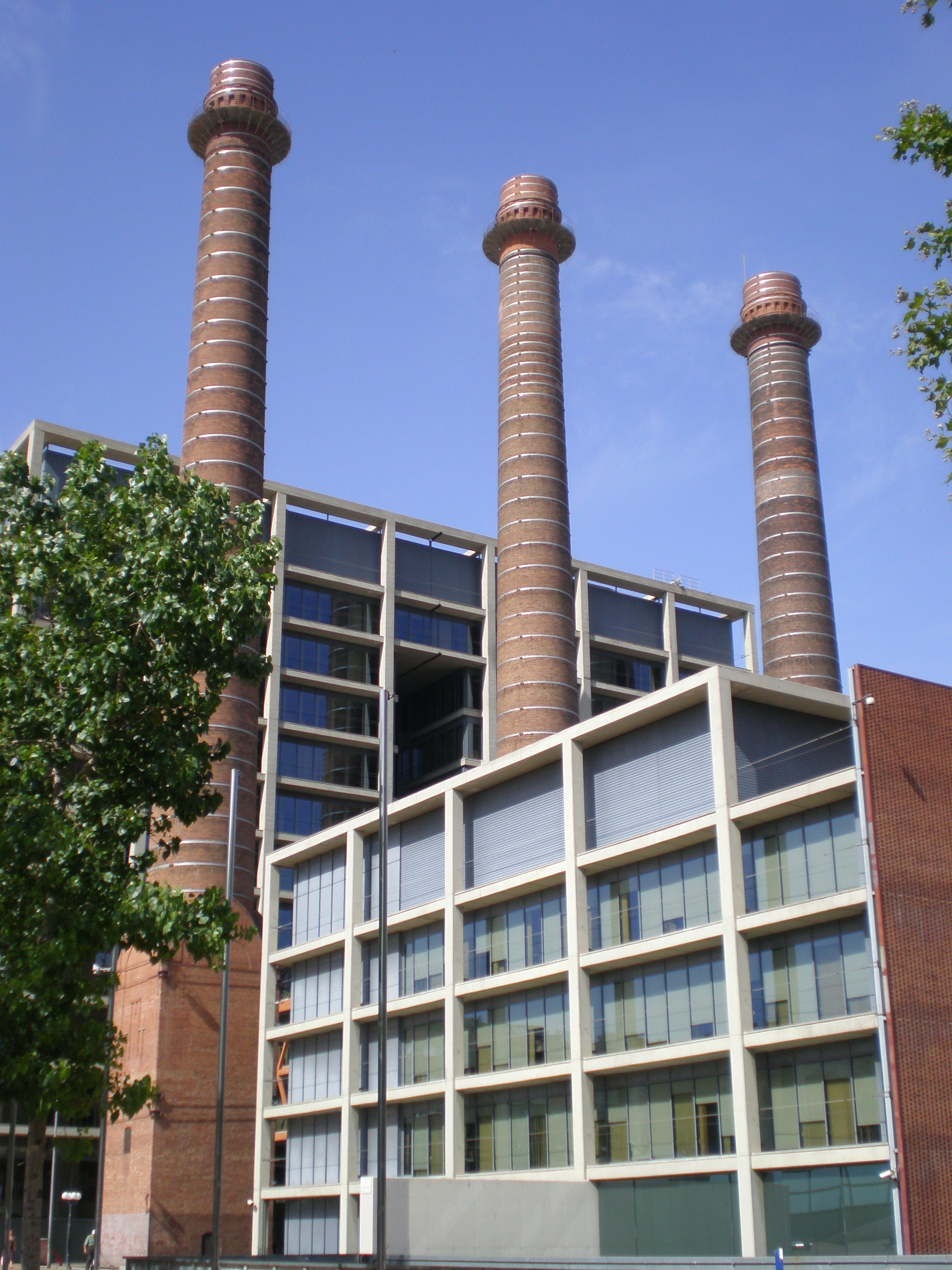
Former AEG -Barcelona Traction factory chimneys and the building of Fecsa-Endesa in Avinguda del Paral·lel

Avinguda del Paral·lel (Catalan pronunciation: [əβiŋˈɡuðə ðəl pəɾəˈlːɛl]; 'Avenue of the Parallel') is one of the main streets of the city of Barcelona, dividing Ciutat Vella, Eixample and Sants-Montjuïc districts. It receives this name because it is (unlike any other street in Barcelona) parallel to the Equator (at 41°22′30″ North). It runs from Plaça d'Espanya, where the city's exhibition halls are located, to the seafront, Plaça de la Carbonera and the passenger ship port, dividing the neighbourhood of Poble Sec, on the side of Montjuïc, from the neighbourhoods of Sant Antoni and El Raval. It was officially inaugurated on 11 October 1894.

El Paral·lel, as the avenue and sometimes the surrounding quarter are called, is most known for theatres (as of 2009, there are three in the avenue, Apolo, Condal and Victoria, but there were many more), as well as cabarets and erotic shows, or the Sala Apolo. In the past it was the core of Barcelona's nightlife, with music halls and other venues, but this has declined in favour of the city centre and Eixample, and some urban decay is visible. El Molino, once one of the city's most renowned cabarets, was reopened in 2010.

== Other names ==
The original name was Paral·lel, the Catalan language name of the street, according to the city layout plan of 1859 by Ildefons Cerdà. The street was officially opened 8 October 1894.

The street had other official names at different times, although it was always known locally as Paral·lel:

- from 1874: Avenida del Marqués del Duero
- from 1932: Avinguda de Francesc Layret
- from 1939: Avenida del Marqués del Duero
- from 1979: Avinguda del Paral·lel

The dot between the L's is used in the Catalan language to indicated a geminated L: /ll/. Without the dot, a double L is pronounced /ʎ/ in Catalan.

== Transport ==
- There are three stations of the Barcelona Metro network on the avenue: Paral·lel, on L2 (purple line) and L3 (green line); Poble Sec, on L3; and Espanya, underneath Plaça d'Espanya, served by lines L1, L3, L8 and a number of Baix Llobregat-bound Ferrocarrils de la Generalitat de Catalunya commuter lines (Metro del Baix Llobregat).
- The Funicular de Montjuïc is accessed from Paral·lel station.

== See also ==
- Avinguda Meridiana
- Street names in Barcelona
- Urban planning of Barcelona
