= L13 =

L13 or L-13 may refer to:

== Vehicles ==
- LET L-13 Blaník, a trainer glider
- Soviet submarine L-13, a Leninets-class submarine
- Stinson L-13, an American utility aircraft
- Zeppelin LZ 45, a German airship

== Proteins ==
- 60S ribosomal protein L13
- Mitochondrial ribosomal protein L13
- Ribosomal protein L13 leader, a family of human genes

== Other uses ==
- Barcelona Metro line 13
- Kwese language
- Nissan L13 engine
