= Line 13 =

Line 13 may refer to:

== Asia ==
- Line 13 (Beijing Subway), China
- Line 13 (Chengdu Metro), China
- Line 13 (Dalian Metro), China
- Line 13 (Guangzhou Metro), China
- Line 13 (Mumbai Metro), India (planned)
- Line 13 (Shanghai Metro), China
- Line 13 (Shenzhen Metro), China
- MRT Circle Line, numbered 13, Malaysia
- Tokyo Metro Fukutoshin Line, officially line 13, Japan
- West Coast Line (Qingdao Metro), number 13, China

== Europe ==
- Moscow Monorail, Line 13 of the Moscow Metro, Russia
- Line 13, part of the Red Line (Stockholm Metro), in Sweden
- Barcelona Metro line 13, Spain
- Paris Metro Line 13, France
- S13 (ZVV), Zurich, Switzerland

== North America ==
- 13 (BMT rapid transit service), New York City, US (defunct)
- T3 (SEPTA), formerly Route 13, a light rail line in Philadelphia, US
- Mont-Saint-Hilaire line, also designated as line 13, a commuter rail service in Greater Montreal, Quebec

== South America ==
- Line 13 (CPTM), São Paulo, Brazil

== See also ==
- List of public transport routes numbered 13
