= Poble Sec station =

Metro station in Barcelona, Spain

Poble Sec
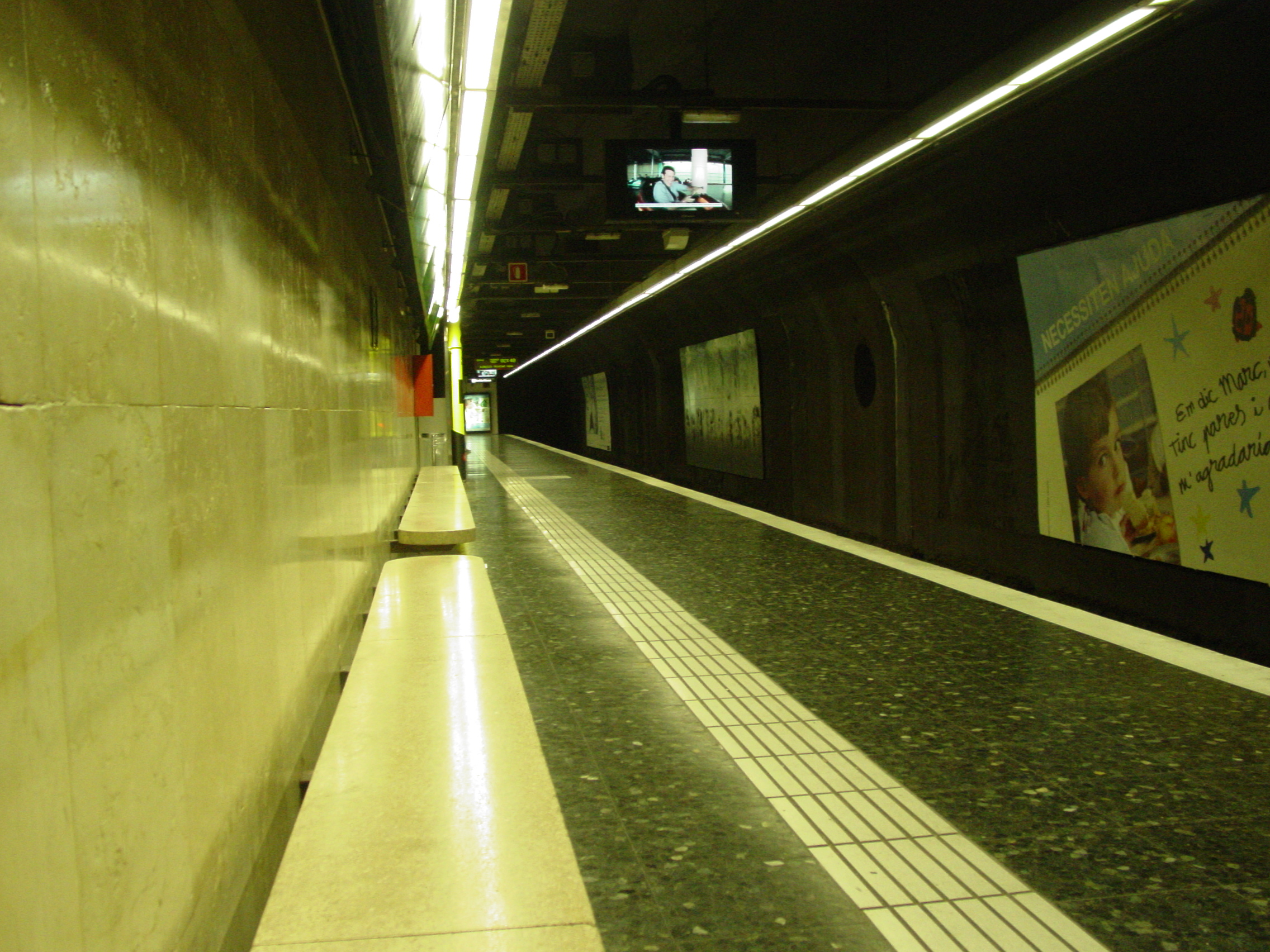
- Platform view of Poble Sec station

General information
- Location: Barcelona (Sants-Montjuïc)
- Coordinates: 41.374722°N 2.160278°E
- System: Barcelona Metro rapid transit station
- Operator: Transports Metropolitans de Barcelona
- Platforms: 2 side platforms

Other information
- Fare zone: 1 (ATM)

History
- Opened: 1975

Services
Preceding station	Metro	Following station
Espanya towards Zona Universitària	L3	Paral·lel towards Trinitat Nova
Projected
Fira 1-MNAC towards Airport T1	L2	Sant Antoni towards Badalona Pompeu Fabra
Location
- Location within Barcelona Location within Spain

Poble Sec (Catalan pronunciation: [ˈpɔbːlə ˈsɛk]) is a station of the Barcelona Metro network located in the neighbourhood of the same name, in the district of Sants-Montjuïc, Barcelona. It is served by L3 (green line), and was previously known as Parlamento.

The station is located directly under Avinguda del Paral·lel between Carrer de Manso and Carrer del Parlament. It can be accessed from entrances in Carrer de Manso and Carrer de Teodor Bonaplata. The platforms are 94 metres (308 ft) long each and are one next to another, albeit separated by a wall.

The station opened in 1975, along with the other stations of the section of L3 between Paral·lel and Sants Estació stations. This section was originally operated separately from L3 and known as L3b. The station adopted its current name in 1982 at about the same time that L3b was merged with L3 proper.

Future plans are for L2, which currently terminates one stop down the L3 at Paral·lel station, to be diverted into new platforms at Poble Sec. L2 will then continue to a terminus at Barcelona Airport, and Poble Sec will become an interchange station between L2 and L3.

== See also ==
- List of Barcelona Metro stations
