= List of public transport routes numbered 13 =

In public transport, Route 13 may refer to:

- Route 13 (MTA Maryland), a bus route in Baltimore, Maryland
- NWFB Route 13, a bus route in Hong Kong
- London Buses route 13
- SEPTA Route 13, a streetcar line in Philadelphia, Pennsylvania and its suburbs
- Tokyo Metro Fukutoshin Line, formerly the no. 13 Fukutoshin Line
- Shanghai Metro Line 13, a subway line in Shanghai
- Moscow Monorail, a closed monorail line in Moscow, Russia

== See also ==
- Line 13 (disambiguation)
