= Sant Antoni station =

Metro station in Barcelona, Spain

Coordinates: 41.3788°N 2.16296°E

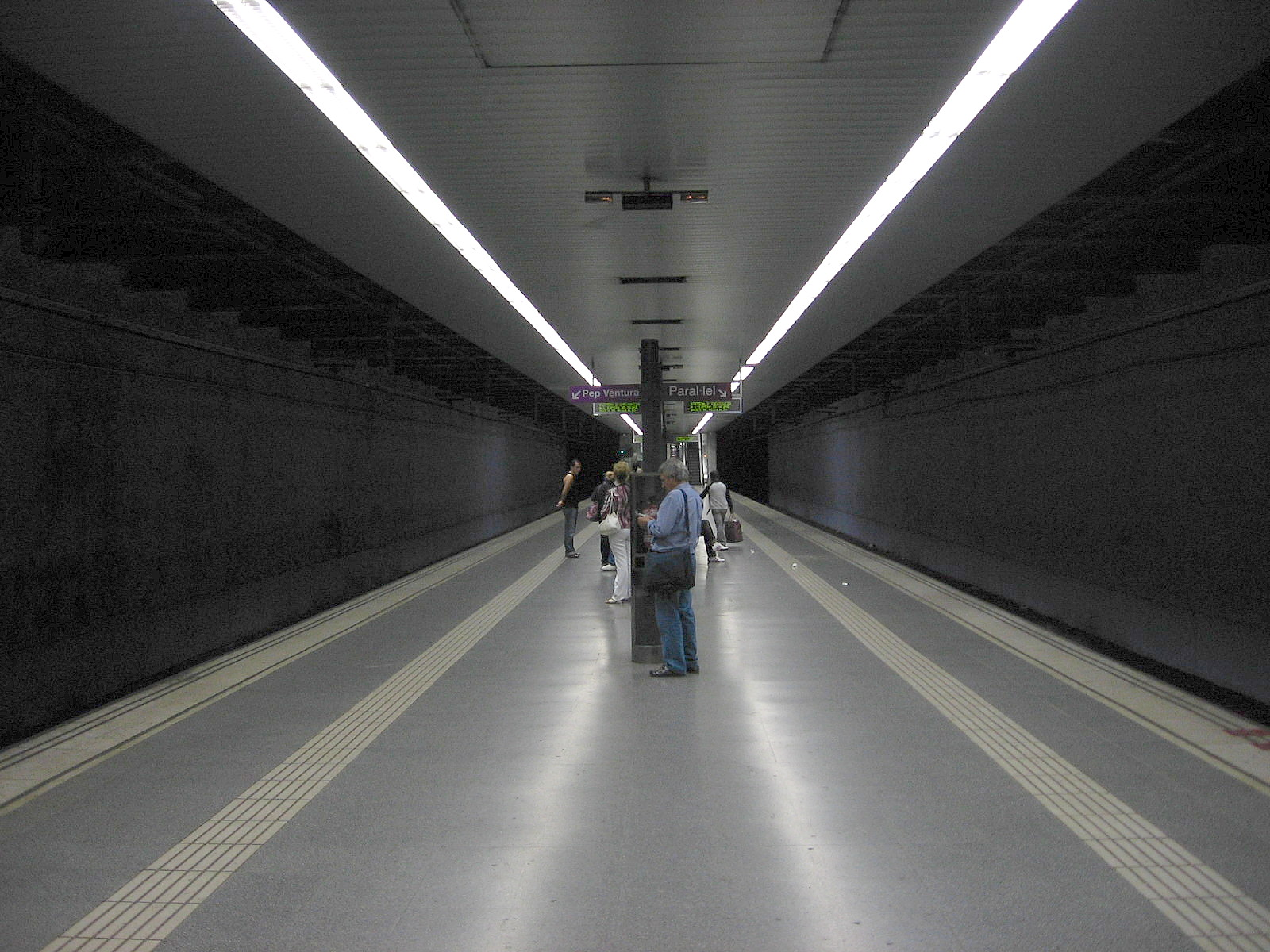

Sant Antoni (Catalan pronunciation: [ˌsant ənˈtɔni]) is a station on line 2 of the Barcelona Metro, opened in 1995. It is located in the Sants-Montjuïc district, under the Ronda de Sant Antoni.

The station has tracks on either side of an island platform, with a ticket hall at either end of the station. There are a total of three entrances: two to the south, on c/ Sant Antoni Abat and c/Comte d'Urgell, and one to the north, at c/ Villaroel. The station is wheelchair-accessible.

== Services ==
Preceding station	Metro	Following station
Paral·lel Terminus	L2	Universitat towards Badalona Pompeu Fabra
Projected
Poble Sec towards Airport T1	L2	Universitat towards Badalona Pompeu Fabra
