= Barcelona Metro 9000 Series =

Metro trains

9000 Series
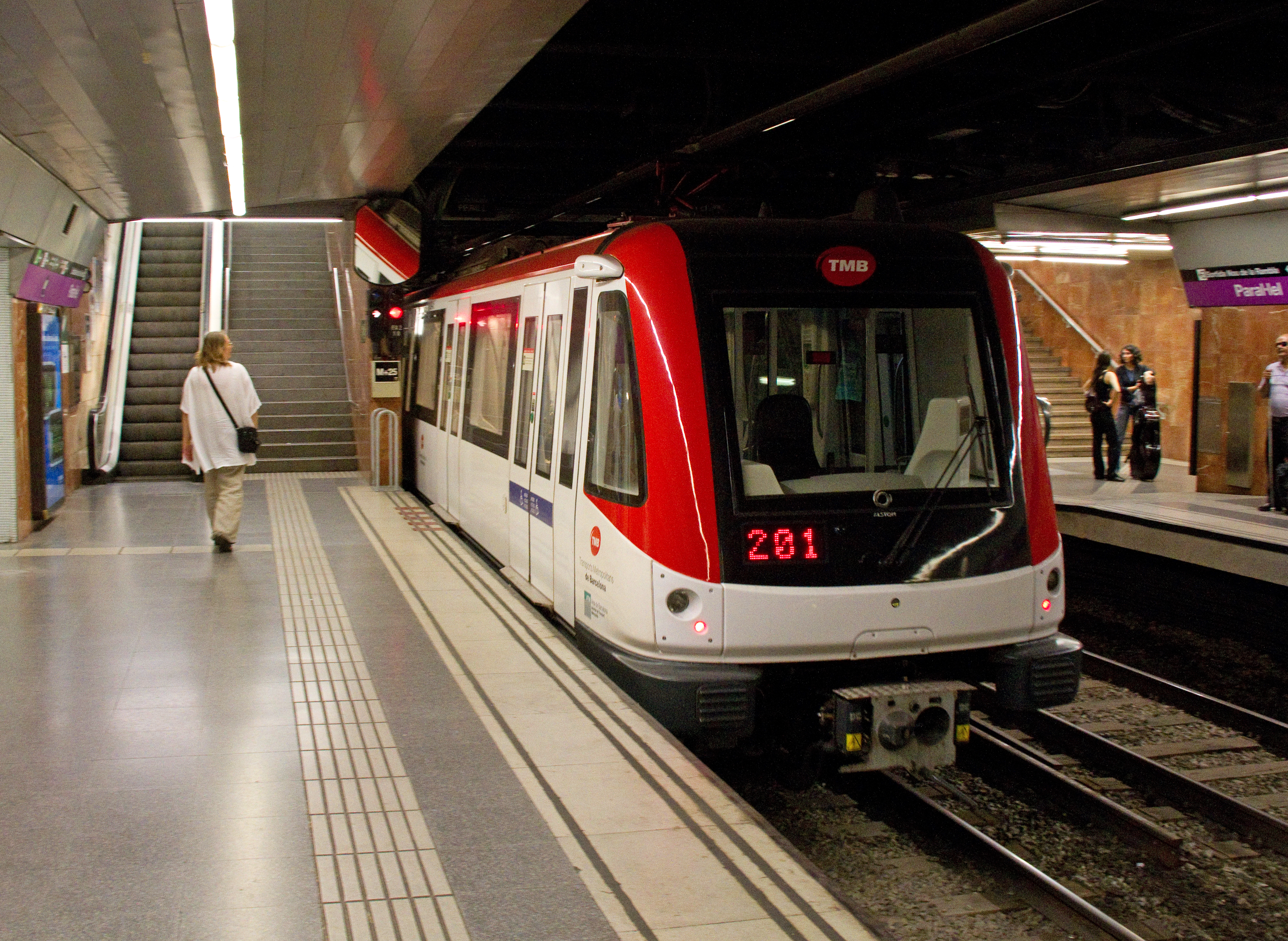
- Exterior

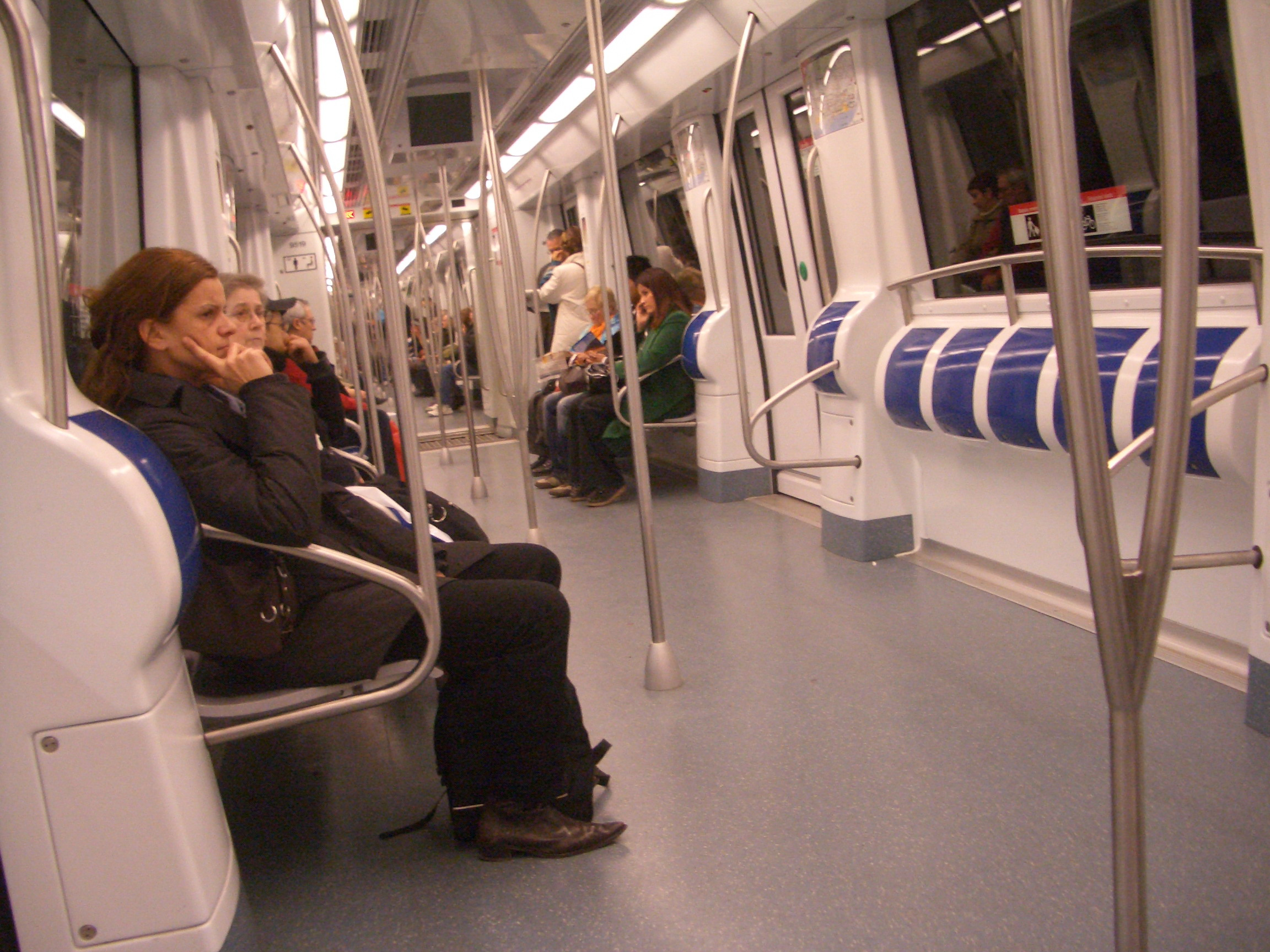
- Interior
- Manufacturer: Alstom
- Family name: Metropolis
- Replaced: 1000 and 1100 Series
- Constructed: 2005-2007
- Entered service: 28 September 2006
- Number built: 58
- Number in service: 58
- Formation: MA1-MB1-R-MB2-MA2
- Capacity: 112 seats
- Operator: Transports Metropolitans de Barcelona

Specifications
- Train length: 86.094 m (282 ft 5 1/2 in)
- Width: 2,710 mm (8 ft 10 3/4 in)
- Height: 3,859 mm (12 ft 7 7/8 in)
- Doors: 4 double
- Maximum speed: 80 km/h (50 mph)
- Traction system: Alstom ONIX 1500 IGBT-VVVF
- Electric systems: 1,200–1,500 V DC from overhead catenary
- Track gauge: 1,435 mm (4 ft 8 1/2 in) standard gauge

The 9000 Series is a series of heavy rail rolling stock that operates on lines 2, 4, 9 and 10 of the Barcelona Metro. Transports Metropolitans de Barcelona (TMB) awarded the contract for the construction of the 9000 series to Alstom in 2002. Constructed in Belgium, France and Spain, they are part of the Alstom Metropolis family of underground trains. Today, the 9000 series also operates in Latin America on the Santo Domingo Metro, Panama Metro, Lima Metro, and 18 three-car trains of this model on Line 3 of the Sistema de Tren Eléctrico Urbano in Jalisco.

== Order and entry into service ==
TMB's contract with Alstom originally specified 50 driverless trains for line 9 only: in July 2005, however, TMB modified the contract to specify 34 semi-automatic trains for lines 2 and 4, and 16 driverless trains for line 9. In April 2009, TMB extended the contract to order 6 additional driverless trains for line 9.

24 trains entered service on Line 2 from 28 September 2006, cascading the 2100 Series to Line 4. 10 trains also entered service on Line 4 with the 2100 Series, replacing the remaining 1000 and 1100 Series trains. The remaining 16 trains entered service on Lines 9 and 10 when the first stages of the lines opened from 13 December 2009, with six more trains to follow when more sections of lines 9 and 10 open.

== Design ==
The trains are capable of speeds of up to 80 km/h (50 mph).

In Barcelona, each train consists of five walk-through cars with longitudinal seating throughout: a five-car train has 112 seats and a three-car train has 64 seats. The end cars contain dedicated spaces for wheelchair users and bicycles.

The trains have closed-circuit television and passenger alarms for public safety, visual and audible door indicators, LCD screens for travel information and advertising, and line maps with lights that indicate the next stations. SEC Lighting provided the semi-recessed fluorescent saloon lighting for the trains.

The actual train cars are made of aluminum with mostly plastic and metal interior parts.

Integral Design and Development was in charge of the exterior and interior design of those vehicles back in 2002, in both driving possibilities, driverless and conventional driver's cab.

== Variations ==
In Barcelona, there are two versions of the 9000 series fleet:

- 34 trains on lines 2/4 have segregated driver cabs and red dot-matrix running numbers, although passengers can still see through the front. They are capable of manual and automatic operation.
- 22 trains on lines 9/10 are automatic and driverless. However, driver controls are available if necessary, and they have front-end evacuation ramps and a smaller front window.

== Operation ==
Train arriving to Airport T1 station (Barcelona Metro line 9).

The 9000 Series presently operate on lines 2, 4 (the latter running in conjunction with the 2100 series), 9 and 10. In an unlikely event of a shortage of trains, they may operate on any standard gauge sections with an overhead power supply.

== Roster ==
Individual cars of the 9000 Series have a four-digit number beginning with 9: originally, the car numbers ranged from 9001 to 9200 for the motor cars, and R9501 to R9550 for the trailer cars, with 50 trains available in total. Due to the order for 6 additional trains in April 2009, and another two in 2019, the numbering ranges for the 9000 Series is currently as follows:

Lines	Range	
Lines	MA/MB	R
Barcelona Metro line 2 Barcelona Metro line 4	9001 to 9120; 9225 to 9232	R9501 to R9530; R9557 to R9558
Barcelona Metro line 9 Barcelona Metro line 10	9121 to 9224	R9531 to R9556

In further detail:

Roster (as of 18 March 2022)
No.	Formation	Operation	Lines	Notes
01	9001-9002-R9501-9003-9004	Semi-automatic	Barcelona Metro line 2	
02	9005-9006-R9502-9007-9008	Semi-automatic	Barcelona Metro line 2	
03	9009-9010-R9503-9011-9012	Semi-automatic	Barcelona Metro line 2	
04	9013-9014-R9504-9015-9016	Semi-automatic	Barcelona Metro line 2	
05	9017-9018-R9505-9019-9020	Semi-automatic	Barcelona Metro line 2	
06	9021-9022-R9506-9023-9024	Semi-automatic	Barcelona Metro line 2	
07	9025-9026-R9507-9027-9028	Semi-automatic	Barcelona Metro line 2	
08	9029-9030-R9508-9031-9032	Semi-automatic	Barcelona Metro line 2	
09	9033-9034-R9509-9035-9036	Semi-automatic	Barcelona Metro line 2	
10	9037-9038-R9510-9039-9040	Semi-automatic	Barcelona Metro line 2	
11	9041-9042-R9511-9043-9044	Semi-automatic	Barcelona Metro line 2	
12	9045-9046-R9512-9047-9048	Semi-automatic	Barcelona Metro line 2	
13	9049-9050-R9513-9051-9052	Semi-automatic	Barcelona Metro line 2	
14	9053-9054-R9514-9055-9056	Semi-automatic	Barcelona Metro line 2	
15	9057-9058-R9515-9059-9060	Semi-automatic	Barcelona Metro line 2	
16	9061-9062-R9516-9063-9064	Semi-automatic	Barcelona Metro line 2	
17	9065-9066-R9517-9067-9068	Semi-automatic	Barcelona Metro line 2	
18	9069-9070-R9518-9071-9072	Semi-automatic	Barcelona Metro line 2	
19	9073-9074-R9519-9075-9076	Semi-automatic	Barcelona Metro line 2	
20	9077-9078-R9520-9079-9080	Semi-automatic	Barcelona Metro line 2	
21	9081-9082-R9521-9083-9084	Semi-automatic	Barcelona Metro line 2	
22	9085-9086-R9522-9087-9088	Semi-automatic	Barcelona Metro line 2	
23	9089-9090-R9523-9091-9092	Semi-automatic	Barcelona Metro line 4	Transferred from L2.
24	9093-9094-R9524-9095-9096	Semi-automatic	Barcelona Metro line 4	Transferred from L2.
25	9097-9098-R9525-9099-9100	Semi-automatic	Barcelona Metro line 4	
26	9101-9102-R9526-9103-9104	Semi-automatic	Barcelona Metro line 4	
27	9105-9106-R9527-9107-9108	Semi-automatic	Barcelona Metro line 4	
28	9109-9110-R9528-9111-9112	Semi-automatic	Barcelona Metro line 4	
29	9113-9114-R9529-9115-9116	Semi-automatic	Barcelona Metro line 4	
30	9117-9118-R9530-9119-9120	Semi-automatic	Barcelona Metro line 4	
31	9121-9122-R9531-9123-9124	Automatic	Barcelona Metro line 9 Barcelona Metro line 10	Transferred from L4.
32	9125-9126-R9532-9127-9128	Automatic	Barcelona Metro line 9 Barcelona Metro line 10	Transferred from L4.
33	9129-9130-R9533-9131-9132	Automatic	Barcelona Metro line 9 Barcelona Metro line 10	Transferred from L4.
34	9133-9134-R9534-9135-9136	Automatic	Barcelona Metro line 9 Barcelona Metro line 10	Transferred from L4.
35	9137-9138-R9535-9139-9140	Automatic	Barcelona Metro line 9 Barcelona Metro line 10	
36	9141-9142-R9536-9143-9144	Automatic	Barcelona Metro line 9 Barcelona Metro line 10	
37	9145-9146-R9537-9147-9148	Automatic	Barcelona Metro line 9 Barcelona Metro line 10	
38	9149-9150-R9538-9151-9152	Automatic	Barcelona Metro line 9 Barcelona Metro line 10	
39	9153-9154-R9539-9155-9156	Automatic	Barcelona Metro line 9 Barcelona Metro line 10	
40	9157-9158-R9540-9159-9160	Automatic	Barcelona Metro line 9 Barcelona Metro line 10	
41	9161-9162-R9541-9163-9164	Automatic	Barcelona Metro line 9 Barcelona Metro line 10	
42	9165-9166-R9542-9167-9168	Automatic	Barcelona Metro line 9 Barcelona Metro line 10	
43	9169-9170-R9543-9171-9172	Automatic	Barcelona Metro line 9 Barcelona Metro line 10	
44	9173-9174-R9544-9175-9176	Automatic	Barcelona Metro line 9 Barcelona Metro line 10	
45	9177-9178-R9545-9179-9180	Automatic	Barcelona Metro line 9 Barcelona Metro line 10	
46	9181-9182-R9546-9183-9184	Automatic	Barcelona Metro line 9 Barcelona Metro line 10	
47	9185-9186-R9547-9187-9188	Automatic	Barcelona Metro line 9 Barcelona Metro line 10	
48	9189-9190-R9548-9191-9192	Automatic	Barcelona Metro line 9 Barcelona Metro line 10	
49	9193-9194-R9549-9195-9196	Automatic	Barcelona Metro line 9 Barcelona Metro line 10	
50	9197-9198-R9550-9199-9200	Automatic	Barcelona Metro line 9 Barcelona Metro line 10	
51	9201-9202-R9551-9203-9204	Automatic	Barcelona Metro line 9 Barcelona Metro line 10	2nd batch (2009).
52	9205-9206-R9552-9207-9208	Automatic	Barcelona Metro line 9 Barcelona Metro line 10	2nd batch (2009).
53	9209-9210-R9553-9211-9212	Automatic	Barcelona Metro line 9 Barcelona Metro line 10	2nd batch (2009).
54	9213-9214-R9554-9215-9216	Automatic	Barcelona Metro line 9 Barcelona Metro line 10	2nd batch (2009).
55	9217-9218-R9555-9219-9220	Automatic	Barcelona Metro line 9 Barcelona Metro line 10	2nd batch (2009).
56	9221-9222-R9556-9223-9224	Automatic	Barcelona Metro line 9 Barcelona Metro line 10	2nd batch (2009).
57	9225-9226-R9557-9227-9228	Semi-automatic	Barcelona Metro line 4	3rd batch (2019).
58	9229-9230-R9558-9231-9232	Semi-automatic	Barcelona Metro line 4	3rd batch (2019).

== 9000 Series abroad ==
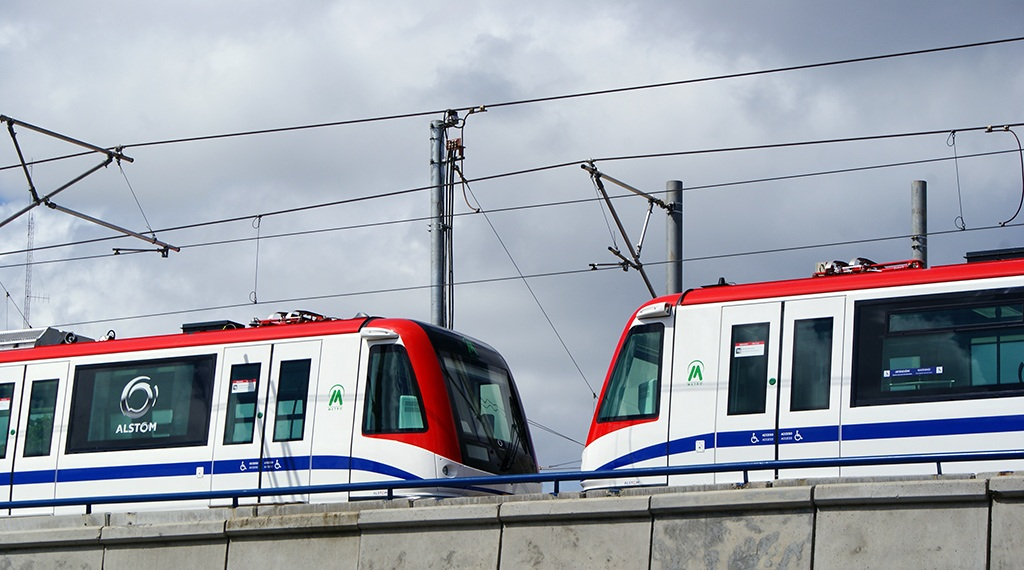
Two sets of 9000 series are parked at La Isabela on the Santo Domingo Metro.

Four other metro systems operate the manual version of the 9000 series or its derivatives, with segregated driver cabs and walk-through cars: the Santo Domingo Metro operates 34 three-car trains with a similar external livery, and the Lima Metro has operated 19 five-car trains in its own external and internal livery since February 2013. The Sistema de Tren Eléctrico Urbano (SITEUR) is now operating 18 of them on line 3. All of these trains were also manufactured in Belgium, France and Spain. Very similar rolling stock is used in the Panama Metro. They were all made in Barcelona, Catalonia, Spain.

== 9000 Series in culture ==
The Via Oberta miniature railway operates a live steam scale (1:11) version of the 9000 series in the Barcelona Metro livery.
