= Barcelona Metro line 13 =

Coordinates: 41.4511°N 2.2466°E

Line 13 is a proposed service in the Barcelona Metro network which would join La Morera (neighborhood) in Badalona, a municipality of Barcelonès to the north of Barcelona, with the hilly area around Can Ruti Hospital. The line, which will be a short hybrid light rail-metro addition to the main subway lines which will cover a poorly communicated area, similar to L11 and L8, was announced in 2002 by Generalitat de Catalunya (Catalan government). It was also made public the line will be displayed in maps using a shade of pink (Pantone 232C).

In the future Morera, L13 will join L2, and will not be too far from the new terminus of L1, which are currently being extended into this area of Badalona, in what will be Badalona Centre. The chosen colour for L13 is intended to suggest a mixture of the L1 and L2 colours. As of 2019, the Generalitat de Catalunya hasn't stated when construction will start.

== Stations in the original project ==
- Morera
- Canyet
- Can Ruti
