= Paral·lel station =

Barcelona Metro station

Paral·lel
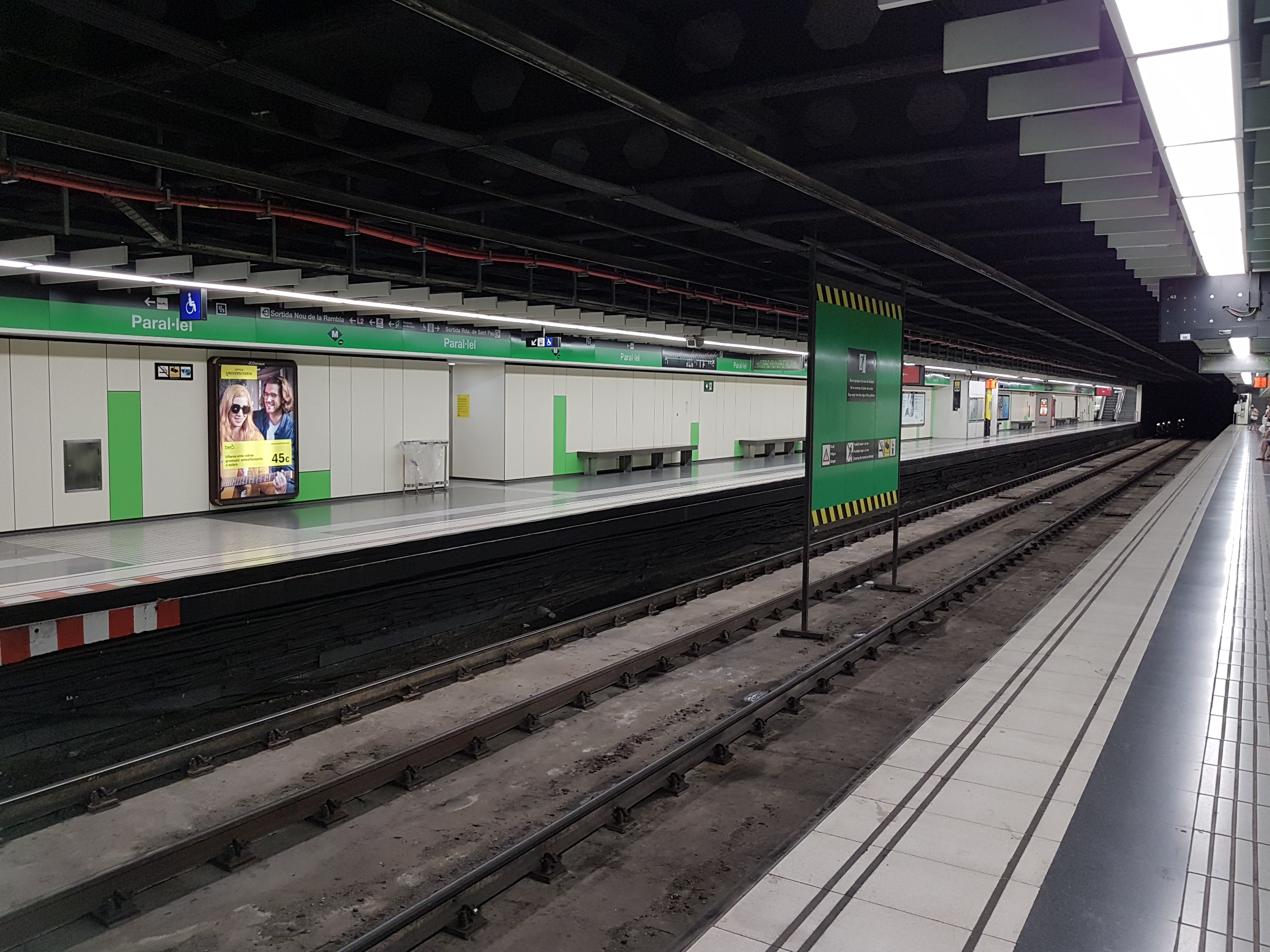
- Line 3 platforms

General information
- Location: Barcelona (Sants-Montjuïc)
- Coordinates: 41.374722°N 2.168611°E
- System: Barcelona Metro rapid transit station
- Operator: Transports Metropolitans de Barcelona
- Platforms: 6 side platforms (2 on each line)

Construction
- Accessible: yes

Other information
- Fare zone: 1 (ATM)

History
- Opened: 17 June 1970; 31 December 1995

Services
Preceding station	Metro	Following station
Terminus	L2	Sant Antoni towards Badalona Pompeu Fabra
Poble Sec towards Zona Universitària	L3	Drassanes towards Trinitat Nova
Parc de Montjuïc Terminus	Montjuïc Funicular	Terminus
Location
- Location within Barcelona Location within Spain

Paral·lel (Catalan pronunciation: [pəɾəˈlːɛl]) is a Barcelona Metro station, located under Avinguda del Paral·lel, between the streets of Ronda de Sant Pau and Carrer Nou de la Rambla. It is served by L3, is the southern terminus of L2, and also the lower terminal of the Funicular de Montjuïc.

The station has two levels. The platforms for lines L2 and L3 are situated side by side at the lower level, with each line having a pair of side platforms. A direct connection for cross-platform interchange is provided between the platforms for Zona Universitària (L3) and Badalona – Pompeu Fabra (L2). The funicular terminus is at the upper level, with side platforms on either side of the single terminal track. Transfers between the funicular and lines L2 and L3 are inside the ticket barriers of the station, and from a fare perspective the funicular is treated as another line of the metro.

The station opened in 1970 with the extension of line L3 from Drassanes. When the line was extended to Zona Universitària, it was initially operated in two sections, with the overhead electrified L3 towards Catalunya and the third rail electrified L3b towards Zona Universitària. The L3 trains terminated in the current L3 platforms, whilst the L3b trains used those now used by L2. The two sections were unified, with L3b converted to overhead electrification, in June 1982, and the L3b platforms were used for train storage. In 1996, line L2 was extended from Sant Antoni, reusing the erstwhile L3b platforms as the L2's terminus. It was the eighth most used station in 2024 with nearly 8.5 million users.

Future plans are for L2 to be diverted at Sant Antoni, via an interchange with L3 at Poble Sec, to Barcelona Airport. This diversion will render the section of L2 from Sant Antoni to Paral·lel, and the L2 terminal tracks at Paral·lel, redundant.

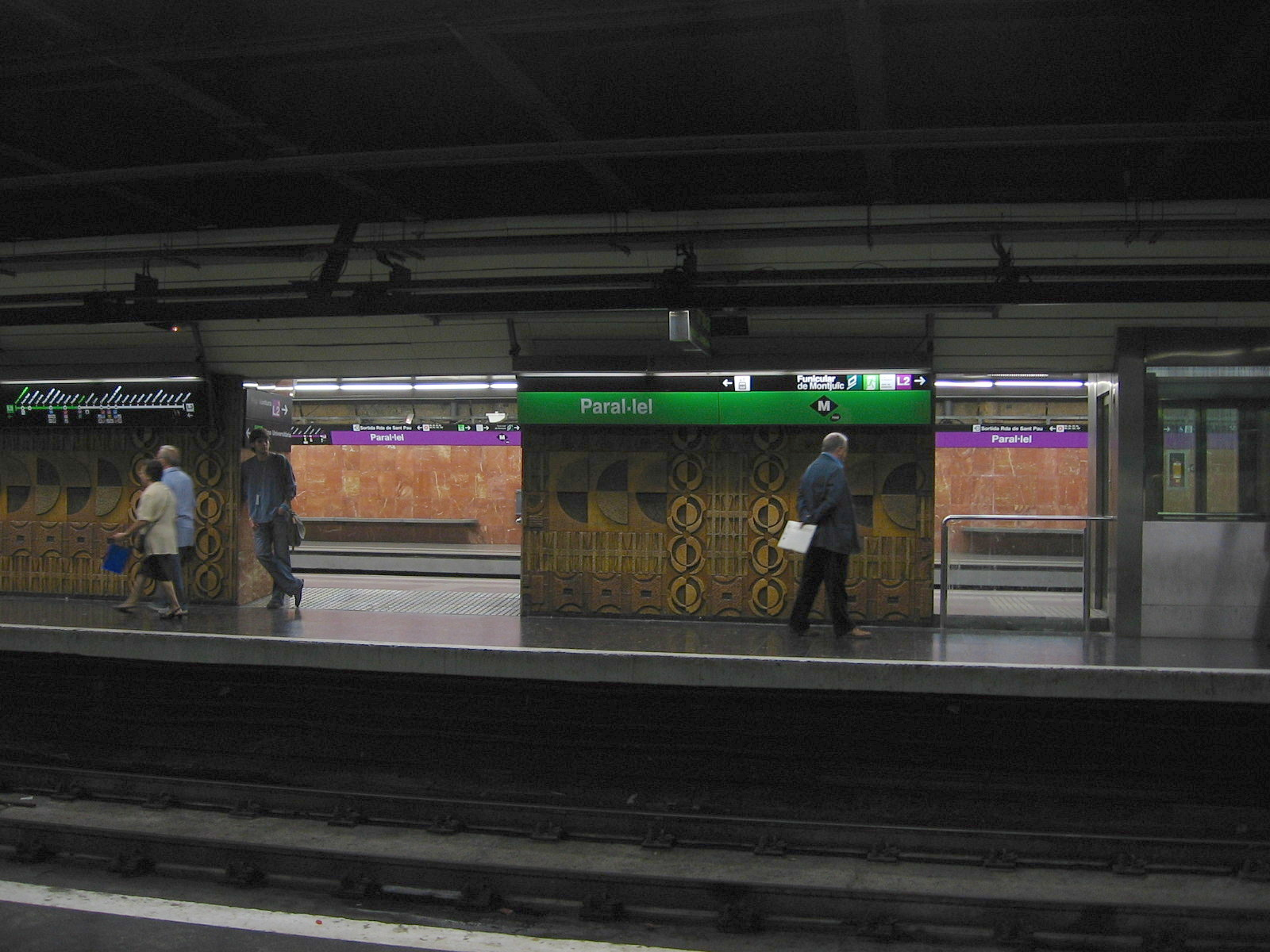
The platforms for lines L2 (purple) and L3 (green) are next to each other

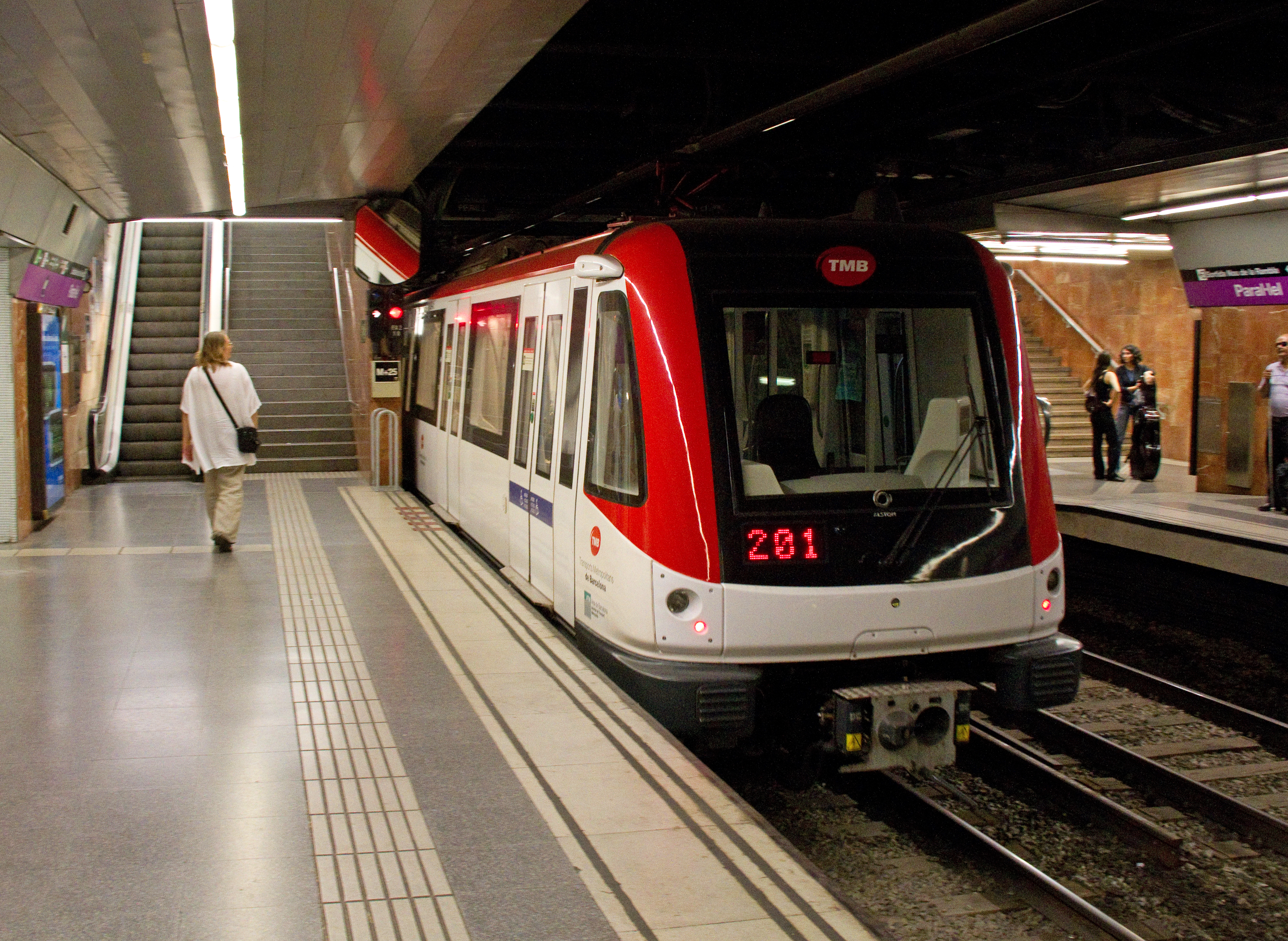
9000 series leaving the station on Line 2

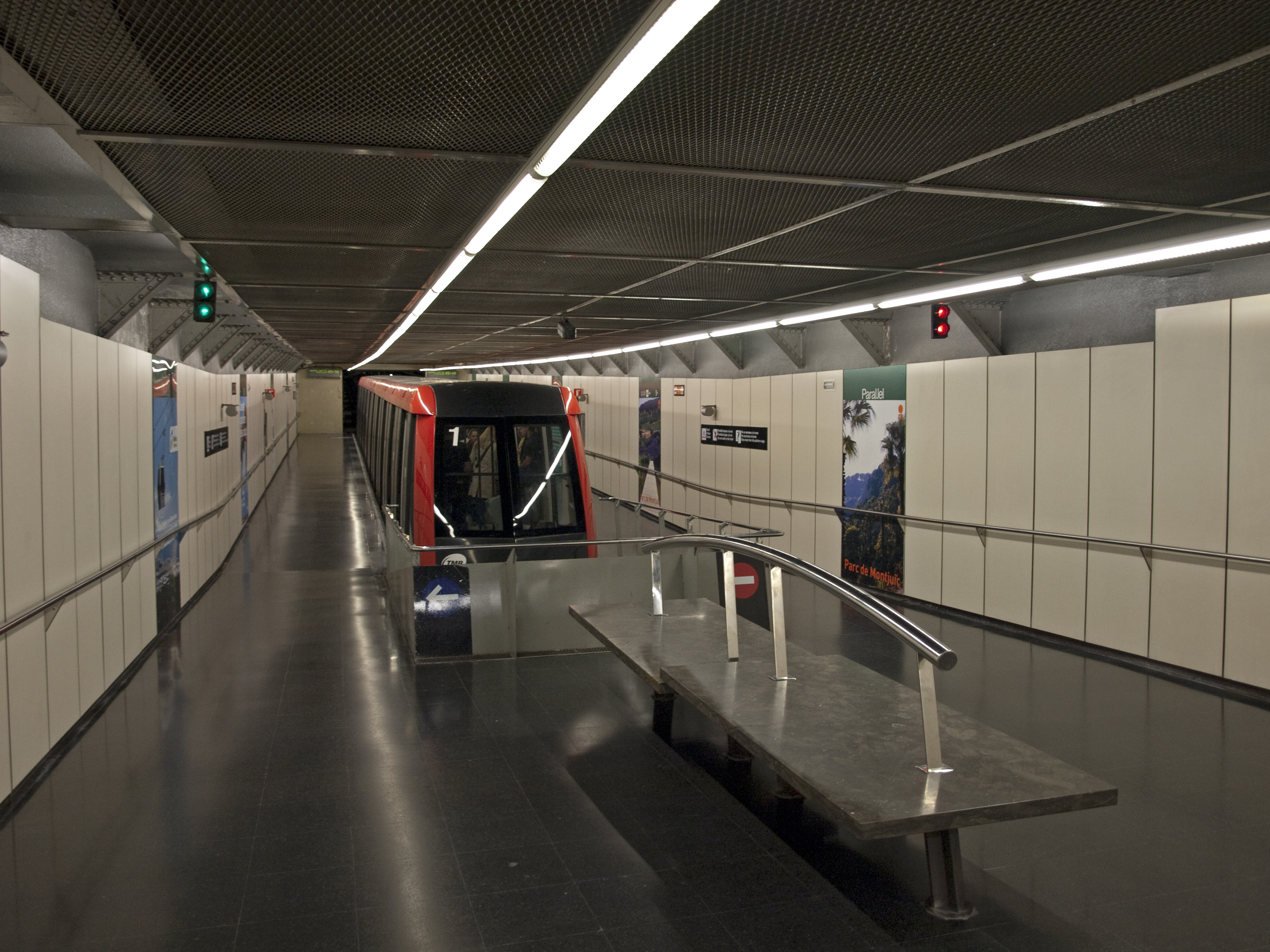
The funicular platforms
