= Badalona Pompeu Fabra station =

Metro station in Barcelona, Spain

Coordinates: 41°27′06″N 2°15′05″E

Badalona Pompeu Fabra
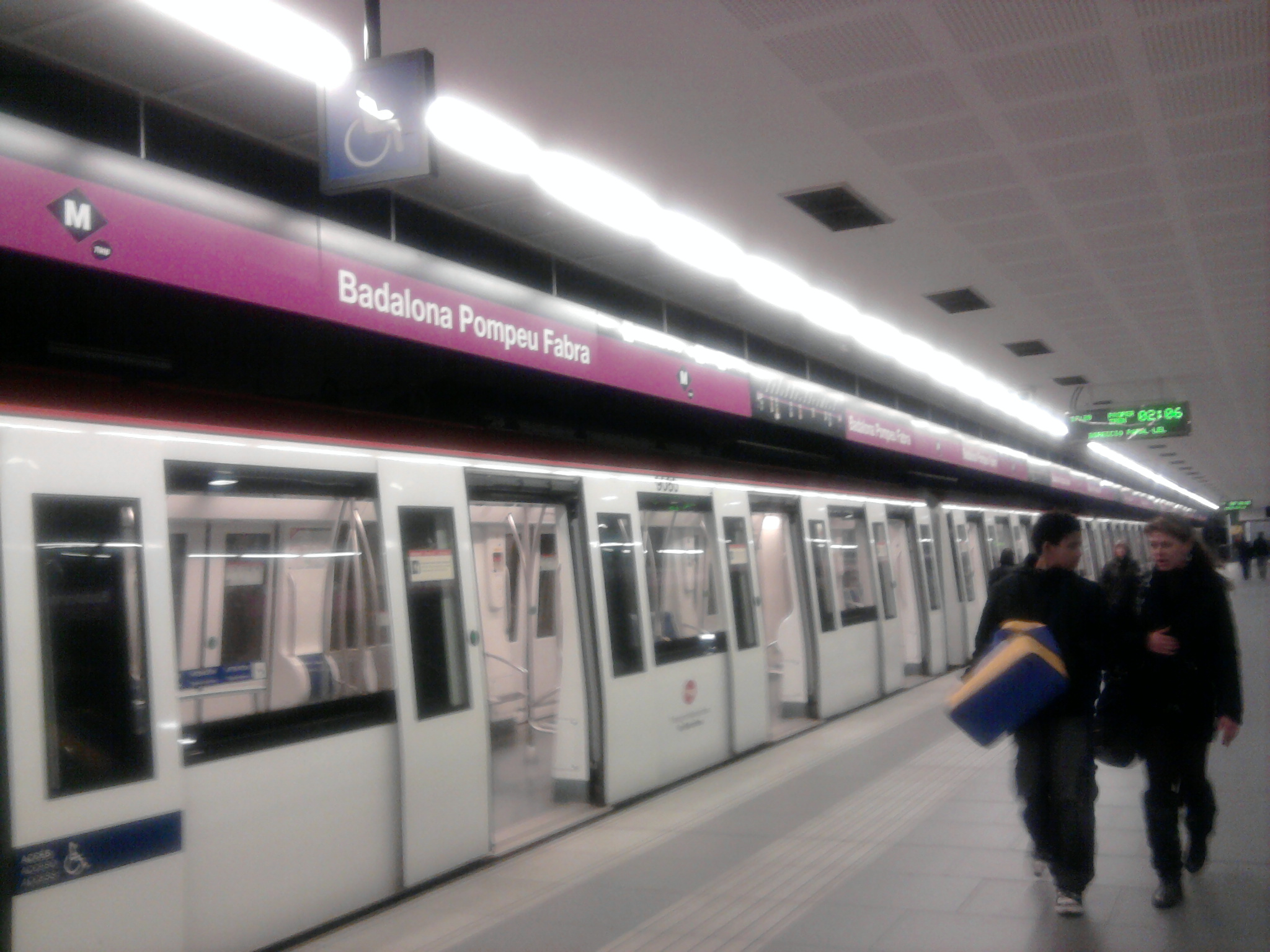
- Station platforms

General information
- Location: Badalona, Barcelona; Spain
- Operator: Barcelona Metro

History
- Opened: 2010

Services
Preceding station	Metro	Following station
Pep Ventura towards Paral·lel	L2	Terminus
Projected
Bufalà towards El Prat Estació	L1	Badalona Est Terminus
Pep Ventura towards Airport T1	L2	Terminus

Badalona Pompeu Fabra (Catalan pronunciation: [bəðəˈlonə pumˈpɛw ˈfaβɾə]) is the name of a Barcelona Metro station in downtown Badalona, a municipality in the metropolitan area of Barcelona, served by metro line L2, and its northern terminus. Safeguarded plans for the extension of L1 also include this station. It's named after Pompeu Fabra, grammarian and political figure.

If the project is finally approved, it will be part of L13 as well. Construction started in October 2005 and was initially expected to be opened in 2007 under the working name Badalona Centre. However, the station wouldn't be inaugurated until 2010, due to controlled demolition problems and the discovery of Roman ruins in the area. Its platforms are over 100 m long and 9 m wide.
