= Barcelona Metro line 2 =

Rapid transit line in Barcelona, Spain

Coordinates: 41.444°N 2.238°E

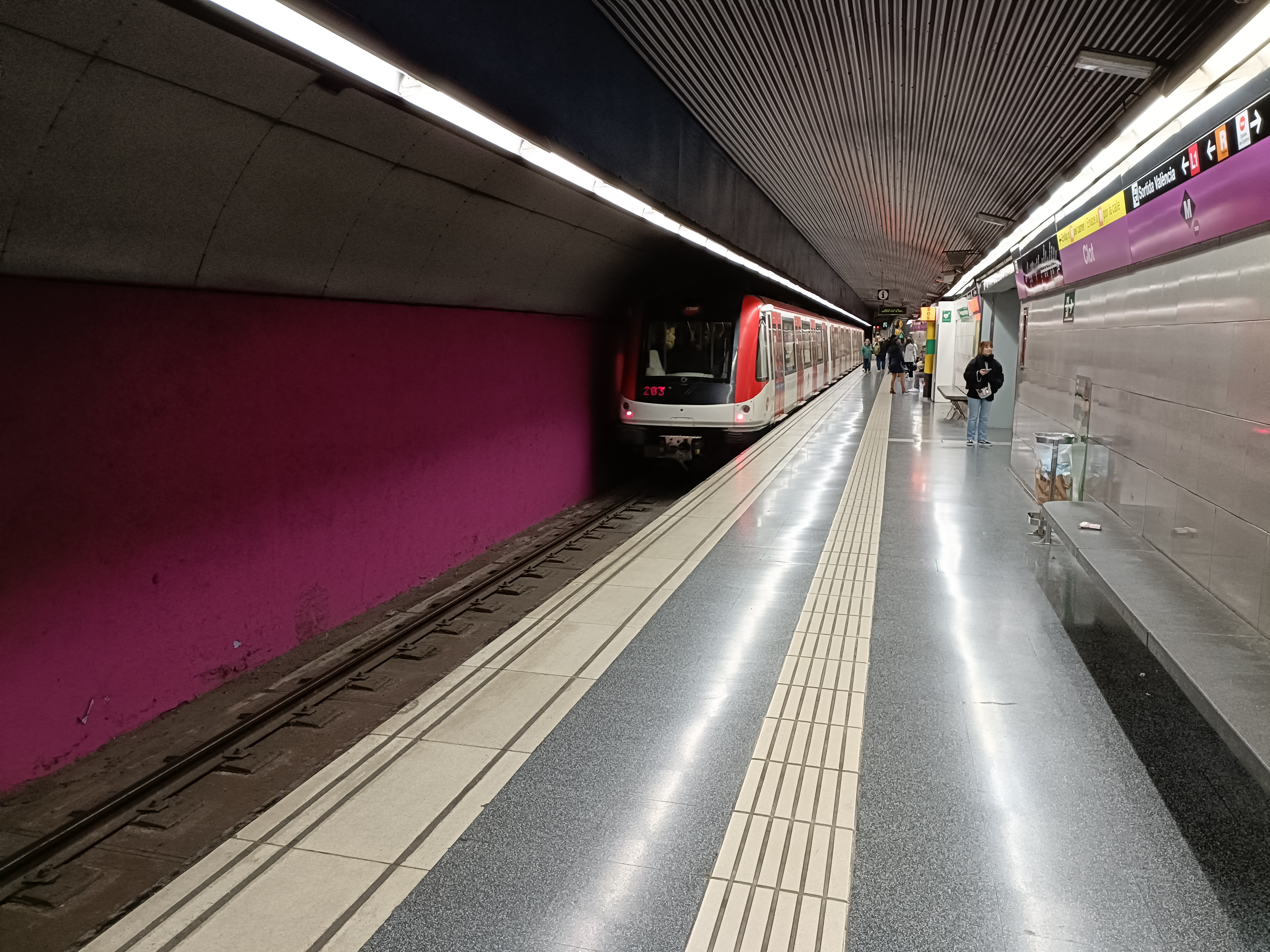
- A 9000 series train leaving Clot

Overview
- Service type: Conventional metro
- Locale: Barcelona
- First service: 1959; 67 years ago (as line II, now part of line 5); 1985; 41 years ago (La Pau – Pep Ventura segment, as part of Line 4); 1995; 31 years ago (current route)
- Current operator: TMB

Route
- Termini: Paral·lel; Badalona Pompeu Fabra
- Stops: 18
- Distance travelled: 13.1 km (8.1 mi)
- Average journey time: 24 minutes

Technical
- Rolling stock: 9000 series based at Triangle ferroviari depot
- Track gauge: 1,435 mm (4 ft 8 1/2 in) standard gauge
- Electrification: 1,200–1,500 V DC rigid overhead wire
- Track owner: TMB

Line 2 (Catalan pronunciation: [ˈlini.ə ˈdos]) is a metro line in Barcelona operated by TMB, coloured purple and sometimes called Línia lila ([ˈlini.ə ˈlilə]; "Purple Line"). It is part of the city's ATM fare-integrated transport network.

As of 2013, its termini are Paral·lel, in the Sants-Montjuïc district, and Badalona Pompeu Fabra, in Badalona. Plans are underway for a southern extension to Poble Sec and Montjuïc, and eventually to El Prat airport.

Line 2's architecture bears resemblance to older lines, with its characteristic simplicity and lack of ornament. However, the stations enjoy noticeably better lighting and do incorporate some more modern architectural principles, a symbol of its construction in the 1990s.

== Overview ==
The original plan for Line 2 and Line 5

Portions of Line 2 commenced in the 1950s as line II, now part of Line 5, initially running from La Sagrera-Meridiana station to Vilapicina station. The current L2 was planned in preparation for the 1992 Summer Olympics, to be held on the then-underserved Montjuïc. Delays, however, resulted in an opening dates in 1995, three years after the Games. L2 is the third-newest Metro line in the network, after L11 and the combined L9/L10. All of its stations are underground.

The formation of the modern L2 first began in 1968, when construction commenced to extend the original line II from Sagrada Família station to Poble Sec station, with expected completion in 1971. However, poor planning resulted in significant difficulties in the tunnel's construction. In 1970, it was decided to redirect the original Line II westward and rename it L5, concurrently abandoning the construction of Line II's Gaudí station near the present-day Sagrada Família station. Construction of the tunnel from Sagrada Família station to Sant Antoni halted in 1973. The project was restarted in 1991, which included reconstructing and remodeling stations and tunnels. The reconstruction was completed in 1995, and the following year L2 was extended to Paral·lel station.

=== Plans for western extension ===
Plans for L2 to reach Montjuïc and Zona Franca in the southwest of Barcelona were first discussed as early as 1971, and another proposal for L2 to terminate near the Estadi Olímpic Lluís Companys was made in 1987. In May 1999, a new master plan was adopted which raised the possibility of L2 potentially being extended to El Prat Airport, and in 2006 the plan was later modified for L2 to share L9 Sud's tracks after Parc Logístic station. L9 Sud is El Prat's first connection to the Metro system, supplementing its current connection to the Rodalies commuter rail system. Under the 2006 plan, L2 and L9 will share the same route from Terminal entre pistes (Aeroport T1) to Parc Logístic, at which point they will diverge. L9 will then continue to the north toward Zona Universitària station, and L2 will travel to the east, entering the city centre. However, the construction of the western extension of L2 has still yet to take place as of 2019.

== Chronology ==
Evolution of Line 2, 1959–1967 (as line II, now part of line 5), 1995–2010 (current line 2), including future extensions

- 1995 – Sant Antoni-Sagrada Família section opens.
- 1996 – Sant Antoni-Paral·lel section opens.
- 1997 – Sagrada Família-La Pau section opens.
- 2002 – La Pau-Pep Ventura section moved from L4 to L2.
- 2010 – Pep Ventura-Badalona Pompeu Fabra section opens.

== Stations ==
Station	Image	Location	Opened	Interchanges
Paral·lel		Sants-Montjuïc, Barcelona	6 January 1996	Barcelona Metro Barcelona Metro line 3 Funicular de Montjuïc
Sant Antoni		Sants-Montjuïc, Barcelona	25 September 1995	
Universitat		Eixample, Barcelona	25 September 1995	Barcelona Metro Barcelona Metro line 1
Passeig de Gràcia		Eixample, Barcelona	25 September 1995	Renfe
Tetuan		Eixample, Barcelona	25 September 1995	
Monumental		Eixample, Barcelona	25 September 1995	Trambesòs
Sagrada Família		Eixample, Barcelona	25 September 1995	Barcelona Metro Barcelona Metro line 5
Encants		Eixample, Barcelona	20 September 1997	
Clot		Sant Martí, Barcelona	20 September 1997	Barcelona Metro Barcelona Metro line 1 Rodalies de Catalunya R1–RG1 (Rodalies de Catalunya) R2 (Rodalies de Catalunya)
Bac de Roda		Sant Martí, Barcelona	20 September 1997	
Sant Martí		Sant Martí, Barcelona	20 September 1997	
La Pau		Sant Martí, Barcelona	20 September 1997	Barcelona Metro Barcelona Metro line 4
Verneda		Sant Adrià del Besòs	22 April 1985	
Artigues-Sant Adrià		Badalona	22 April 1985	
Sant Roc		Badalona	22 April 1985	Trambesòs
Gorg		Badalona	22 April 1985	Barcelona Metro Barcelona Metro line 10 Trambesòs
Pep Ventura		Badalona	22 April 1985	
Badalona Pompeu Fabra		Badalona	11 July 2010	
