= Plaza Universidad light rail station =

Light rail station in Guadalajara, Jalisco, Mexico

Plaza Universidad
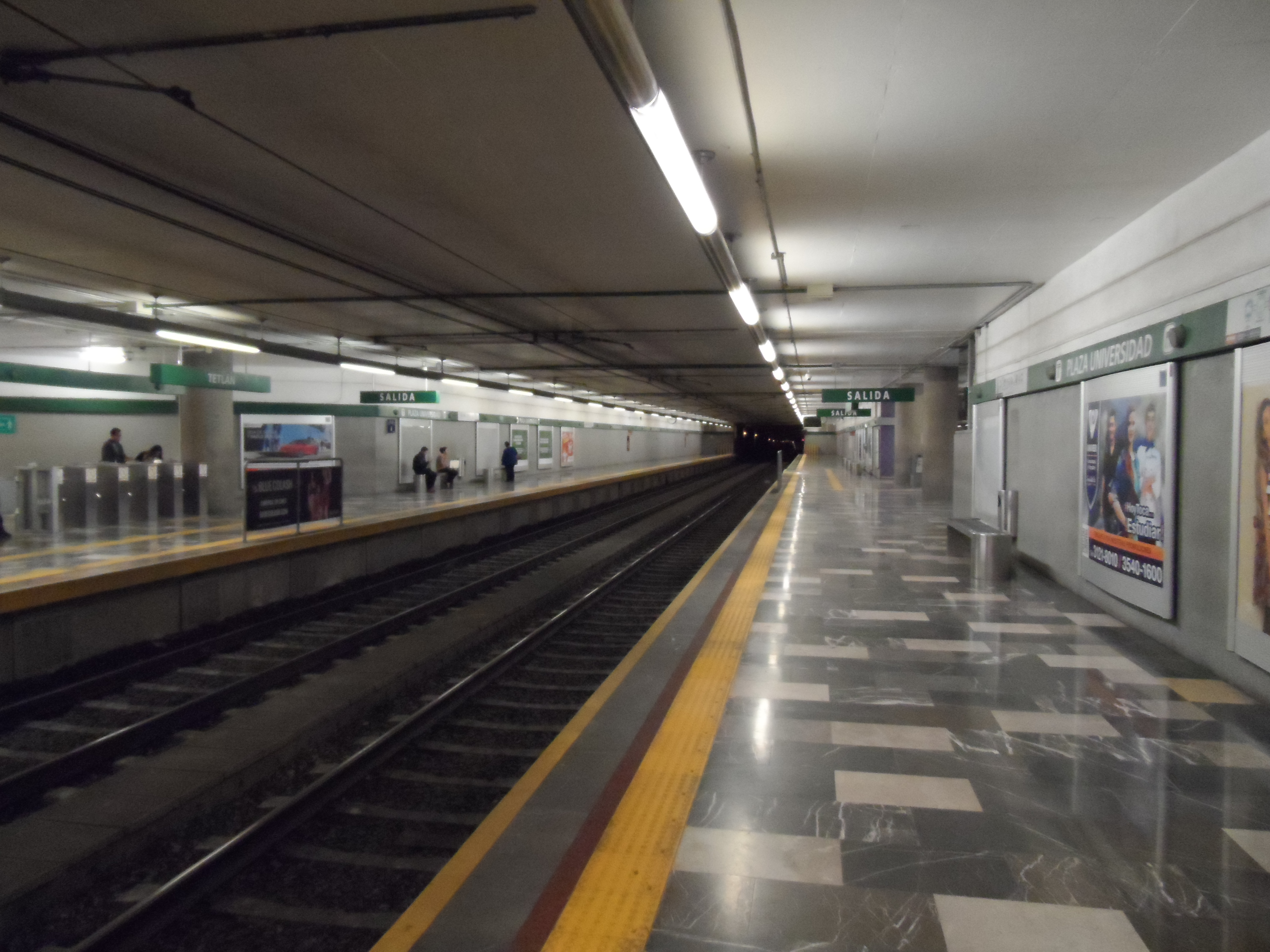
- Line 2 platforms

General information
- Location: Guadalajara; Jalisco, Mexico
- Coordinates: 20°41′31″N 103°20′53″W
- System: SITEUR light rail
- Lines: 2 and 3

Construction
- Structure type: Underground
- Cycle facilities: Yes
- Accessible: Yes

History
- Opened: 1994; 32 years ago

Services
Preceding station	Sistema de Tren Eléctrico Urbano	Following station
Juárez Terminus	Line 2	San Juan de Dios towards Tetlán
Santuario towards Arcos de Zapopan	Line 3	Independencia towards Central de Autobuses
Location

The Plaza Universidad railway station is part of the Sistema de Tren Eléctrico Urbano in the Mexican state of Jalisco. The station is a transfer station that connects Lines 2 and 3 through Guadalajara Centro railway station.
