= Lázaro =

Lázaro is a Spanish or Portuguese-based given name or surname. Notable people with the name include:

== Given name ==
- Lázaro (footballer, born 1977), full name Lazaro Paulo de Sousa, Brazilian football striker
- Lázaro (footballer, born 1990), full name Lázaro Vinícius Alves Martins, Brazilian footballer
- Lázaro (footballer, born 2002), full name Lázaro Vinícius Marques, Brazilian footballer
- Lázaro Álvarez, Cuban boxer
- Lázaro Báez, Argentine entrepreneur
- Lázaro Barbosa de Sousa, Brazilian serial killer and family annihilator
- Lázaro Betancourt, Cuban triple jumper
- Lázaro Blanco, Mexican photographer
- Lázaro Borges, Cuban pole vaulter
- Lázaro Botelho, Brazilian politician
- Lázaro Bruzón, Cuban chess player
- Lázaro Darcourt, Cuban footballer
- Lázaro Francisco, Filipino novelist
- Lázaro Garza Ayala, Mexican politician
- Lázaro Macapagal, Filipino colonel
- Lázaro Medina, Cuban pitcher
- Lázaro Navarro, Cuban tennis player
- Lázaro Oliveira, Angolan footballer
- Lázaro Peña (1911–1974), Cuban labor leader
- Lázaro Ramos, Brazilian actor
- Lázaro Ruiz, Cuban weightlifter
- Lázaro Reinoso, Cuban wrestler
- Lázaro Rivas, Cuban wrestler

== Surname ==
- Andrea Lázaro García, Spanish tennis player
- Borja Lázaro, Spanish footballer
- Carlos Lázaro, Spanish footballer
- Cheche Lazaro, Filipino journalist
- David Lázaro, Spanish footballer
- Emilio Martínez-Lázaro, Spanish film director
- Ezequiel Lázaro, Argentine footballer
- Fernando Lázaro, Brazilian performance analyst
- Fernando Lázaro Fernández (1966–2025), Spanish investigative journalist
- Francisco Lázaro, Portuguese athlete
- Hipólito Lázaro (1887–1974), Spanish singer
- Irmão Lázaro, born Antonio Lázaro da Silva, Brazilian singer
- José Lázaro Galdiano, Spanish financier, journalist, publisher and art collector
- José Lázaro Robles (1924–1996), commonly known as Pinga, Brazilian footballer
- Josué Lázaro, Mexican footballer
- Paloma Lázaro, Spanish footballer
- Paola Lázaro, Puerto Rican actress
- Rosalía Lázaro, Spanish paralympic athlete
- Valentino Lazaro, Austrian footballer

== See also ==
- Lázaro Cárdenas (disambiguation)
- Lázaro Martínez (disambiguation)
