= La Normal metro station =

Light rail station in Guadalajara, Jalisco, Mexico

La Normal
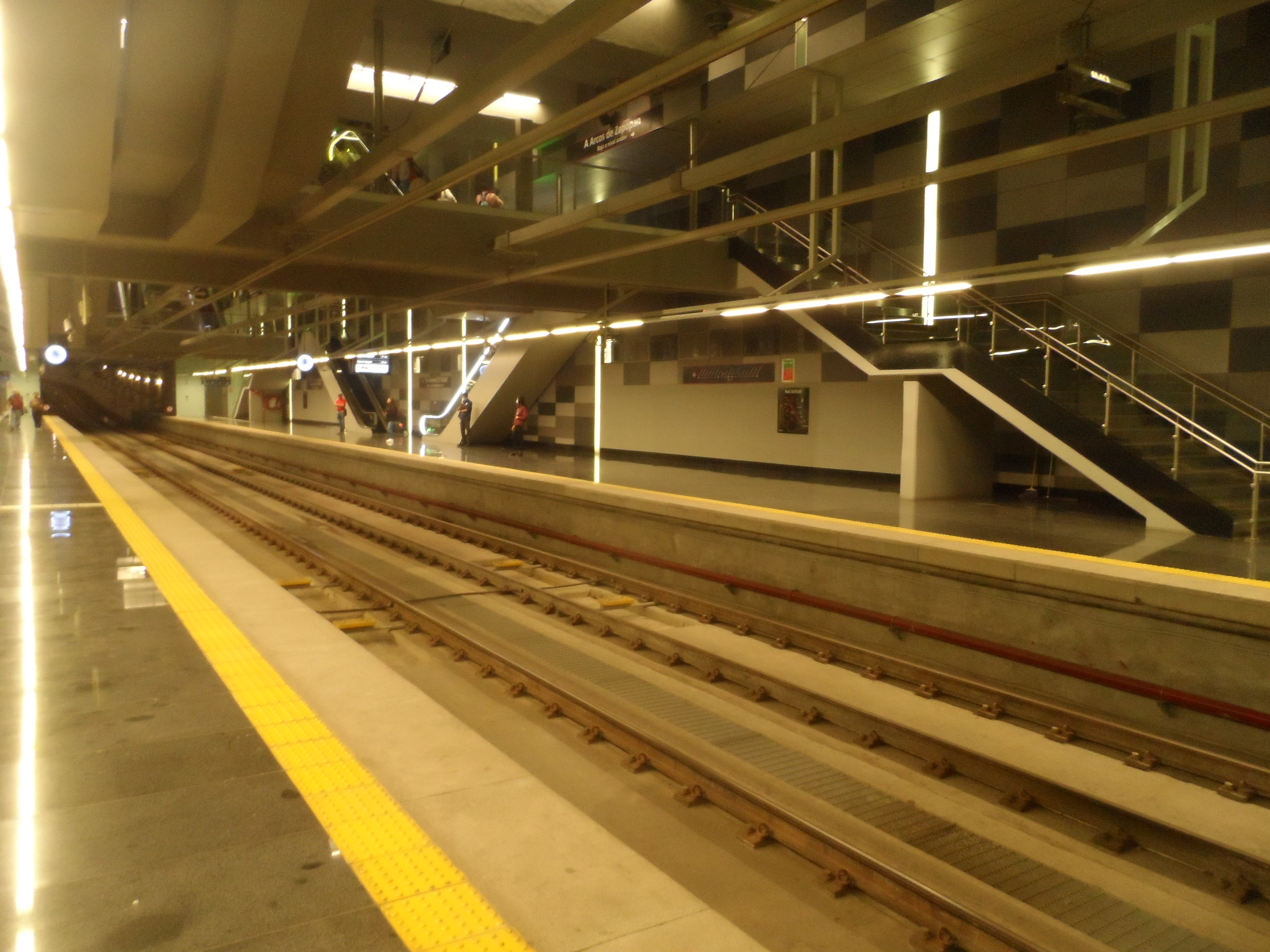
- The station in 2021

General information
- Location: Guadalajara; Jalisco, Mexico
- Coordinates: 20°41′42″N 103°20′55″W
- System: SITEUR light rail
- Line: 3

Construction
- Structure type: Underground
- Cycle facilities: Yes
- Accessible: Yes

History
- Opened: 2020

Services
| Preceding station | Sistema de Tren Eléctrico Urbano | Following station |
|---|---|---|
| Ávila Camacho towards Arcos de Zapopan | Line 3 | Santuario towards Central de Autobuses |
Location

La Normal is the eleventh station of Line 3 of the Guadalajara Urban Electric Train System from south-east to north-west and the eighth in opposite direction. It is one of the line's five underground stations, as well as the northernmost station from the underground tunnel before exiting to the surface towards the elevated viaduct Guadalajara-Zapopan.

Over the station there's an urban bus station known as Centro de Transferencia Multimodal (short name CETRAM), which intends to ease transfers between train and bus.

This station is located next to the Glorieta La Normal, from which it takes its name. The tunnel boring machine La Tapatía began to build the tunnel for line 3 from this geographic point on 6 June 2016. After a delay of one year, the tunnel was completed at the Plaza de la Bandera station on 24 May 2018.

The tunneling works caused sewage leaking in the CUCSH university, so a representative of the Secretariat of Communications and Transportation ensured that they were in talks with the university rector to pay for the damages; though no amount was precised since the mediator was just on the way to verify the damages.

The station logo is an upfront image of a train and three buses (the train is located at the top and the buses at the bottom), alluding to CETRAM.

== Points of interest ==
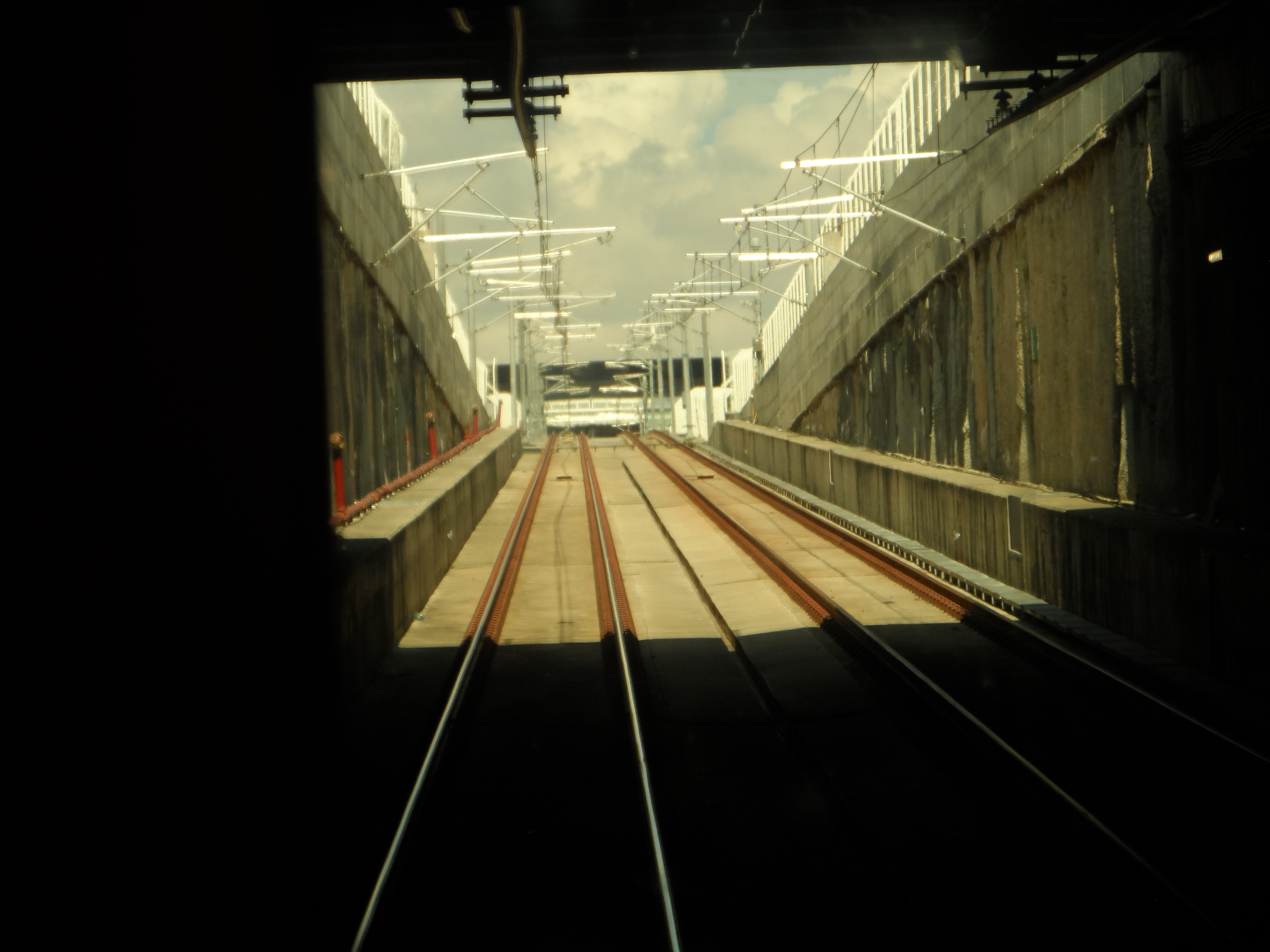
Connection ramp between the first elevated viaduct and the underground tunnel of line 3, between Ávila Camacho and La Normal stations.

- Glorieta La Normal park
- Normal school of Jalisco
- University Center of Social Sciences and Humanities (CUCSH)
- General Directorate of the Civil Registry of Jalisco (Prolongación Alcalde corner with Chihuahua St.)
- Secretariat of Administration of Jalisco
- Secretariat of Public Works and Infrastructure (SIOP)
- Institute of Educational Physical Infrastructure of Jalisco (INFEJAL)
- Pension Institute of Jalisco
- Historical Archive of Jalisco (Tablada St.)
- Jallisco Institute of Social Assistance (Magisterio St. corner with Tamaulipas)
- Public Property Registry (Cadastre)
- IMSS Clinic 51
- CODE Jalisco
- Alcalde park
- Michin aquarium
- "Lunaria" planetary
- Normalistas linear park
- La Normal shopping centre
