= CUCEI metro station =

Light rail station in Guadalajara, Jalisco, Mexico

CUCEI
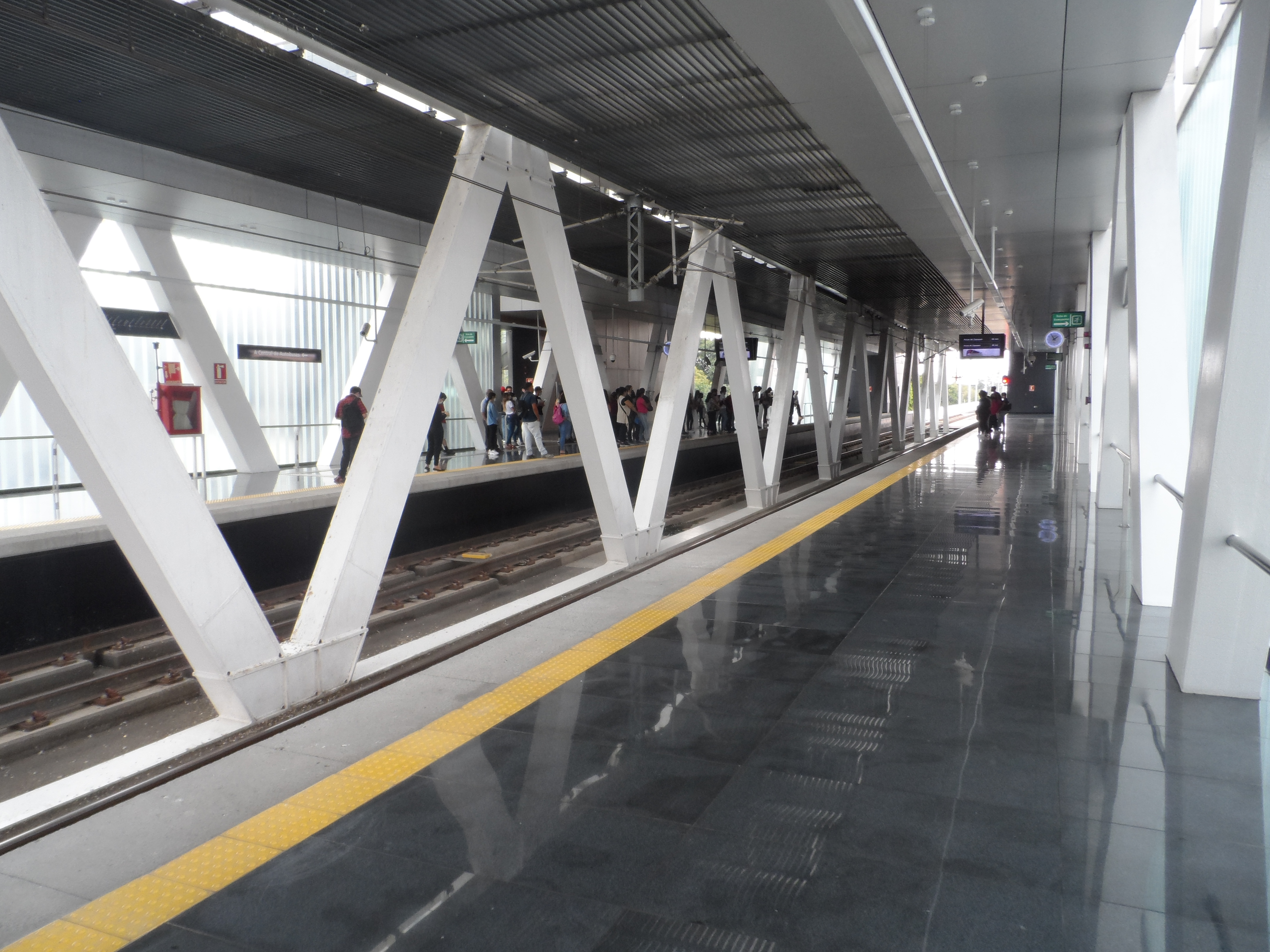
- The station's platforms in 2021

General information
- Location: Guadalajara; Jalisco, Mexico
- Coordinates: 20°39′35″N 103°19′27″W
- System: SITEUR light rail
- Line: 3
- Tracks: 2

Construction
- Structure type: Elevated
- Cycle facilities: Yes
- Accessible: Yes

History
- Opened: 2020

Services
Preceding station	Sistema de Tren Eléctrico Urbano	Following station
Plaza de la Bandera towards Arcos de Zapopan	Line 3	Revolución towards Central de Autobuses
Location

The CUCEI railway station is part of the Sistema de Tren Eléctrico Urbano in the Mexican state of Jalisco. The station gets its name from the University Center of Exact Sciences and Engineering (CUCEI), next to the university complex of the University of Guadalajara in the Olímpica Zone; it's the last of the Second Viaduct —from the east towards the centre of Guadalajara— and it's next to the southern connection ramp with the Subterranean Section.

This station is located over the Revolución Avenue, between the Calzada Olímpica and the Corregidora street (40th st.), which both surround the whole university complex of the Olímpica Zone.

The logotype of the station is the shield of the CUCEI, which is located on the southern side of the station.

== Points of interest ==
- Universitarian complex of the University of Guadalajara by Revolución Av: Polytechnic School (Escuela Politécnica) and Olympic Coliseum (Coliseo Olímpico)
- CECATI n°. 15 (Corregidora street)
- Preparatory school Nº. 12 and Vocational School of Guadalajara (Escuela Vocacional de Guadalajara) (Gral. Marcelino García Barragán Blvd.)
- Olympic pool (Alberca Olímpica) and Technological stadium (Estadio Tecnológico) (by Calzada Olímpica)
- University Center of Exact Sciences and Engineering (Calz. Olímpica corner with Gral. M.G.B. Blvd.)
- Physical culture and sports school from the University Center of Health Sciences (CUCS)
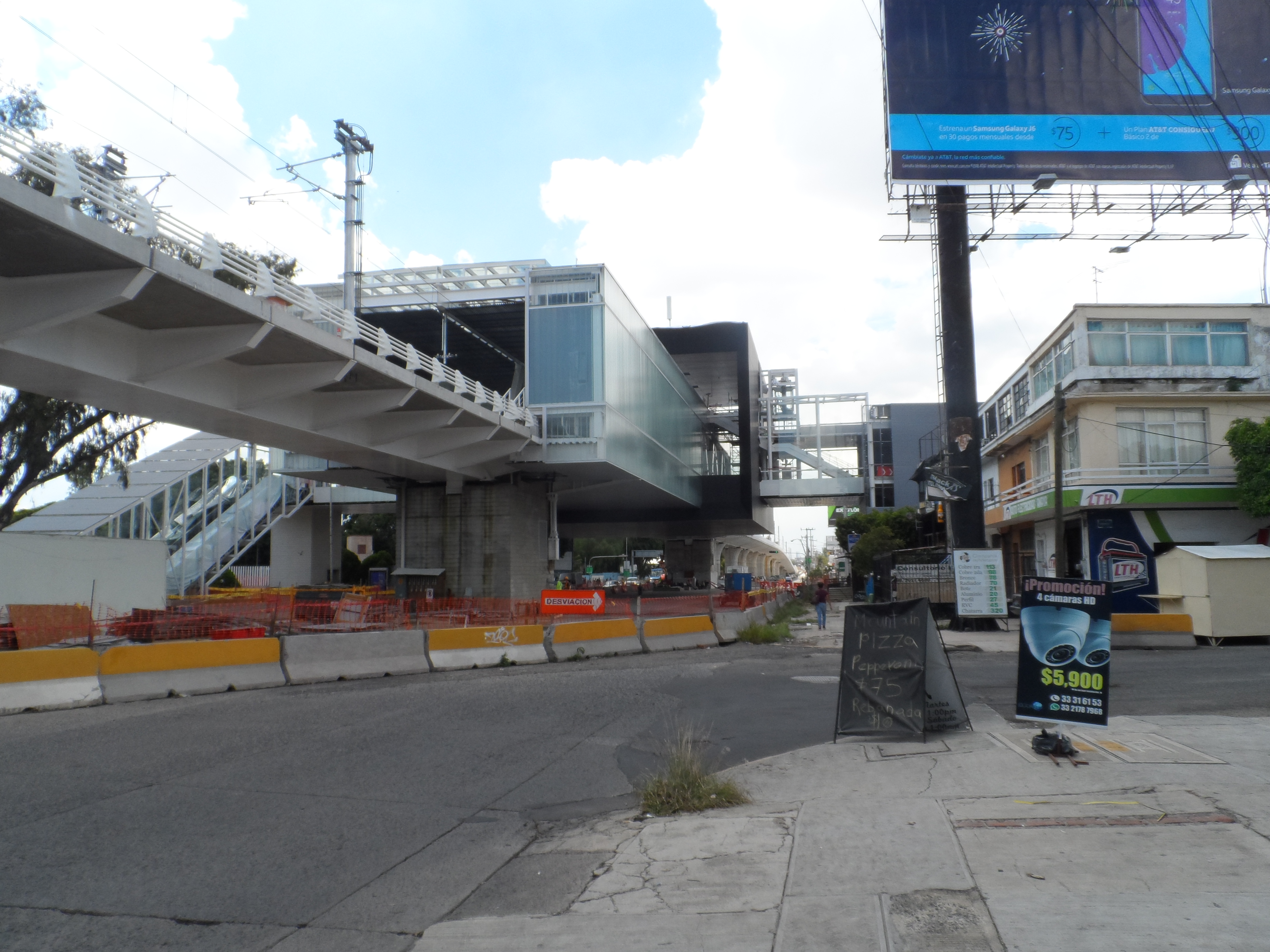
External view of the CUCEI railway station.

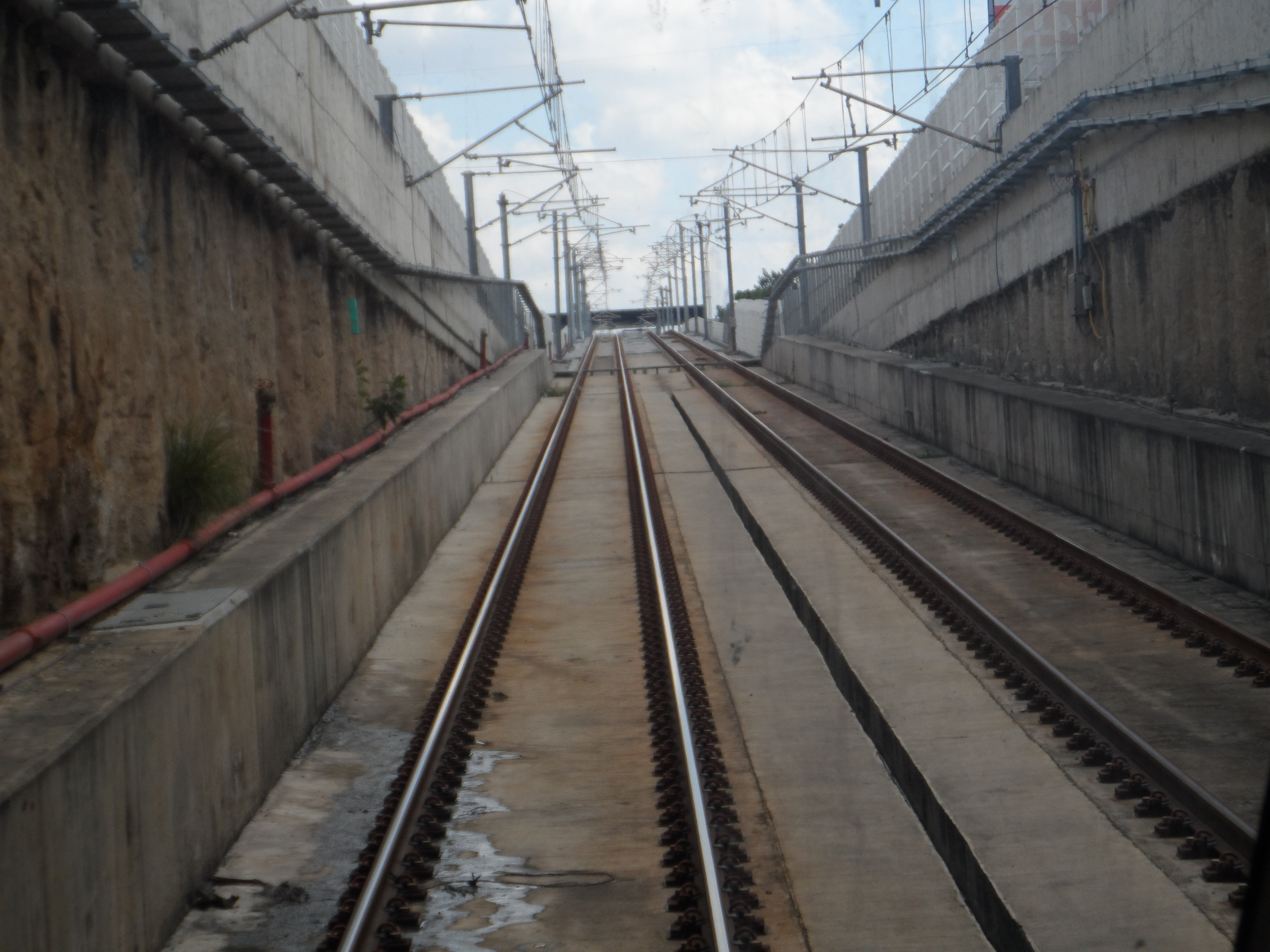
Connection ramp between the underground tunnel and the second elevated viaduct of the line 3, between the Plaza de la Bandera and CUCEI stations.
