= Periférico Belenes metro station =

Railway station in Zapopan, Mexico

Periférico Belenes
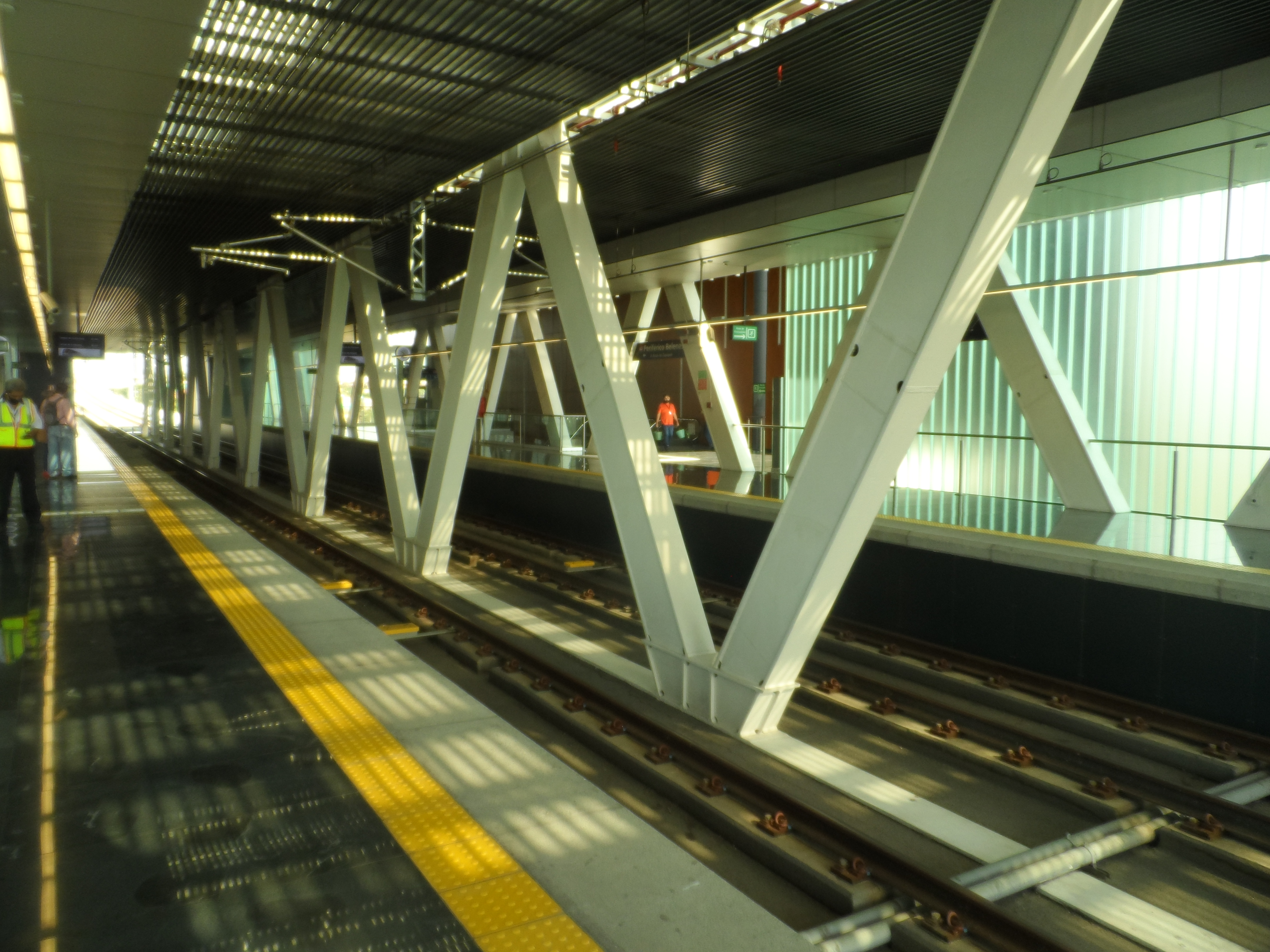
- Platforms of the Periférico Belenes railway station

General information
- Location: Juan Pablo II Av. and North-west Periférico Ring, Zapopan; Jalisco, Mexico
- Coordinates: 20°44′17″N 103°24′11″W
- System: SITEUR light rail
- Line: 3

Construction
- Structure type: Elevated
- Cycle facilities: Yes
- Accessible: Yes

History
- Opened: September 12, 2020

Services
Preceding station	Sistema de Tren Eléctrico Urbano	Following station
Arcos de Zapopan Terminus	Line 3	Mercado del Mar towards Central de Autobuses
Location

Periférico Belenes is the seventeenth station of Line 3 of the Guadalajara SITEUR from south-east to north-west, and the second in the opposite direction.

This station is located on the crossing of Juan Pablo II Av. from Zapopan (earlier on Laureles Av.) with the Periférico Ring that surrounds the Guadalajara metropolitan area. The construction works of this station required completely closing vehicular traffic during 13 weekends. Earlier on, it was planned to build this station a little forward than what it currently is in direction to Zapopan Centro, but due to the planning of the Peribús (renamed as Mi Macro Periférico), it was decided to build the station near the Periférico Ring and from it the station takes the name.

The girder placed on the Northwest Periférico Ring is one of the biggest of the First Viaduct; given the dimensions and weight of the girders between the Arcos de Zapopan and Periférico Belenes stations, it was necessary to do a total closure of the way on Monday 20, March 2017 to maneuver with two cranes of 250 tons and another one of a little over 500 tons in order to place said girders of 200 and 166 tons respectively.

Its logotype is a stylized picture of the facade of the Juan José Arreola Public Library of the State of Jalisco.

It currently has a connection with Mi Macro Periférico.

== Points of interest ==
- Zapopan DIF system
- Belenes Industrial Park
- Gran Terraza Belenes Mall

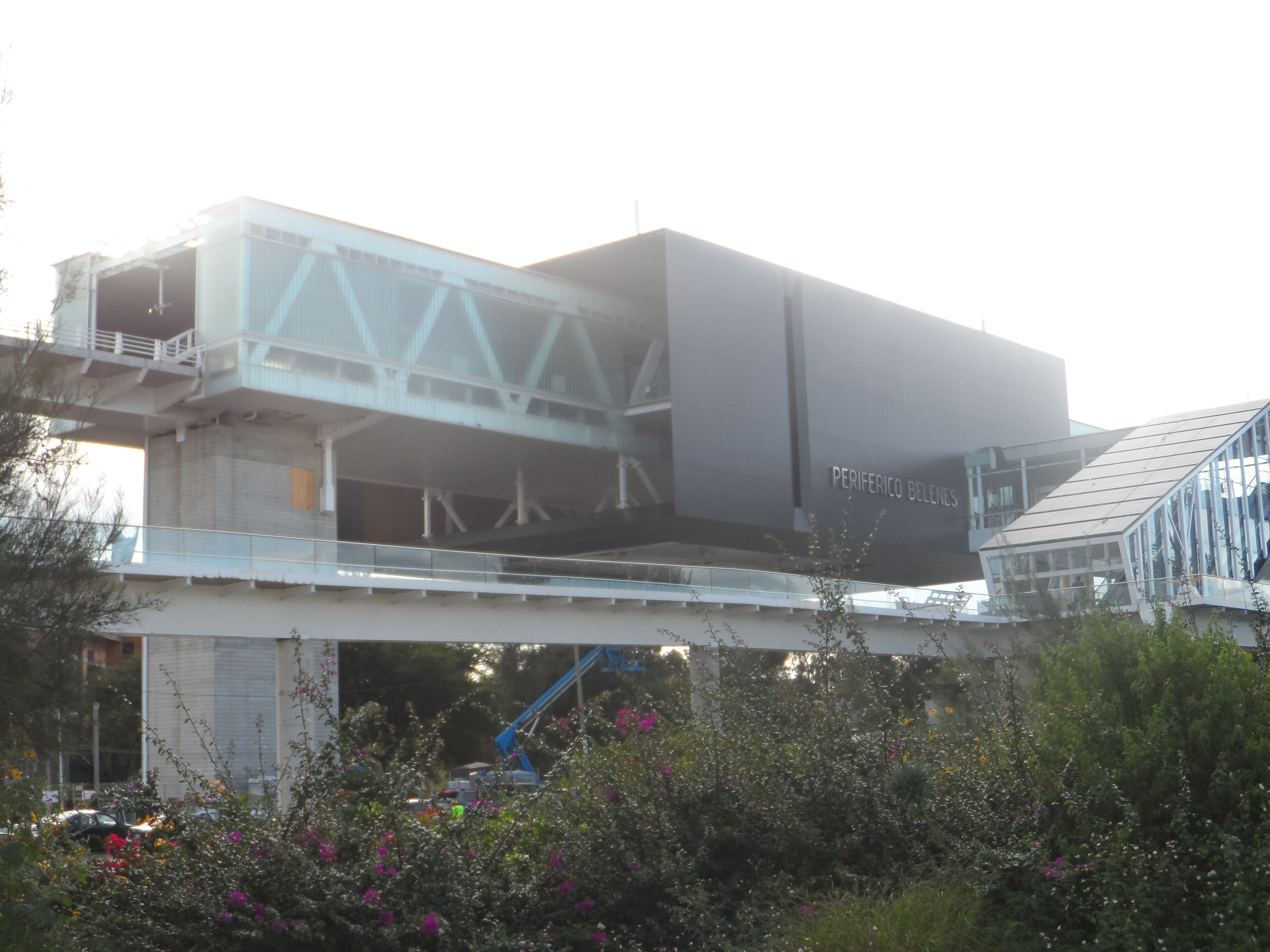
External view of the Periférico Belenes station.

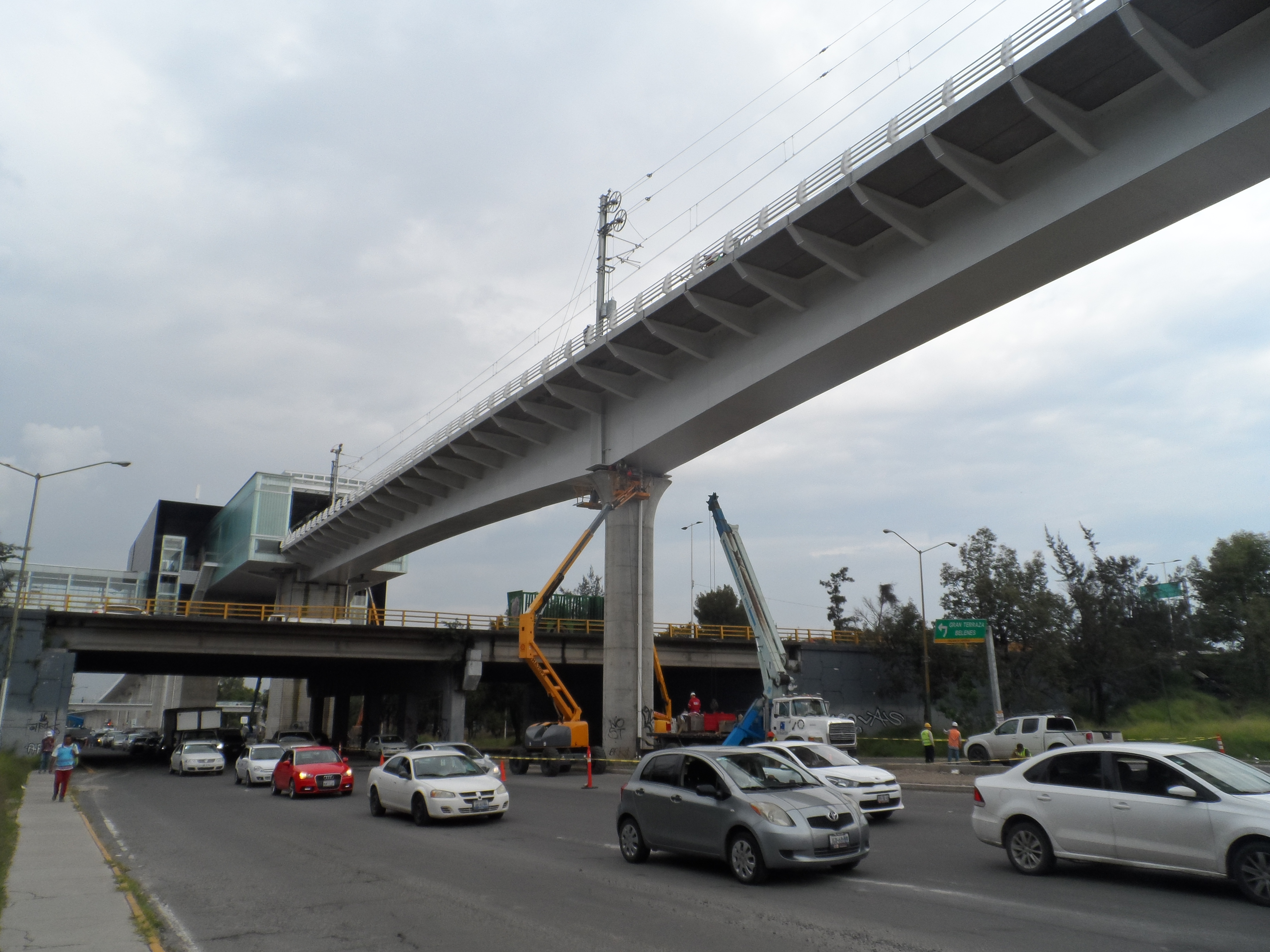
First Viaduct of the Line 3 over the Northwest Periférico Ring, at some metres from the Periférico Belenes station.

== Transport routes ==
- Mi Macro Periférico: Periférico Belenes
- SITREN Line 4
- T16B
