= Revolución metro station (Guadalajara) =

Light rail station in Guadalajara, Jalisco, Mexico

Revolución
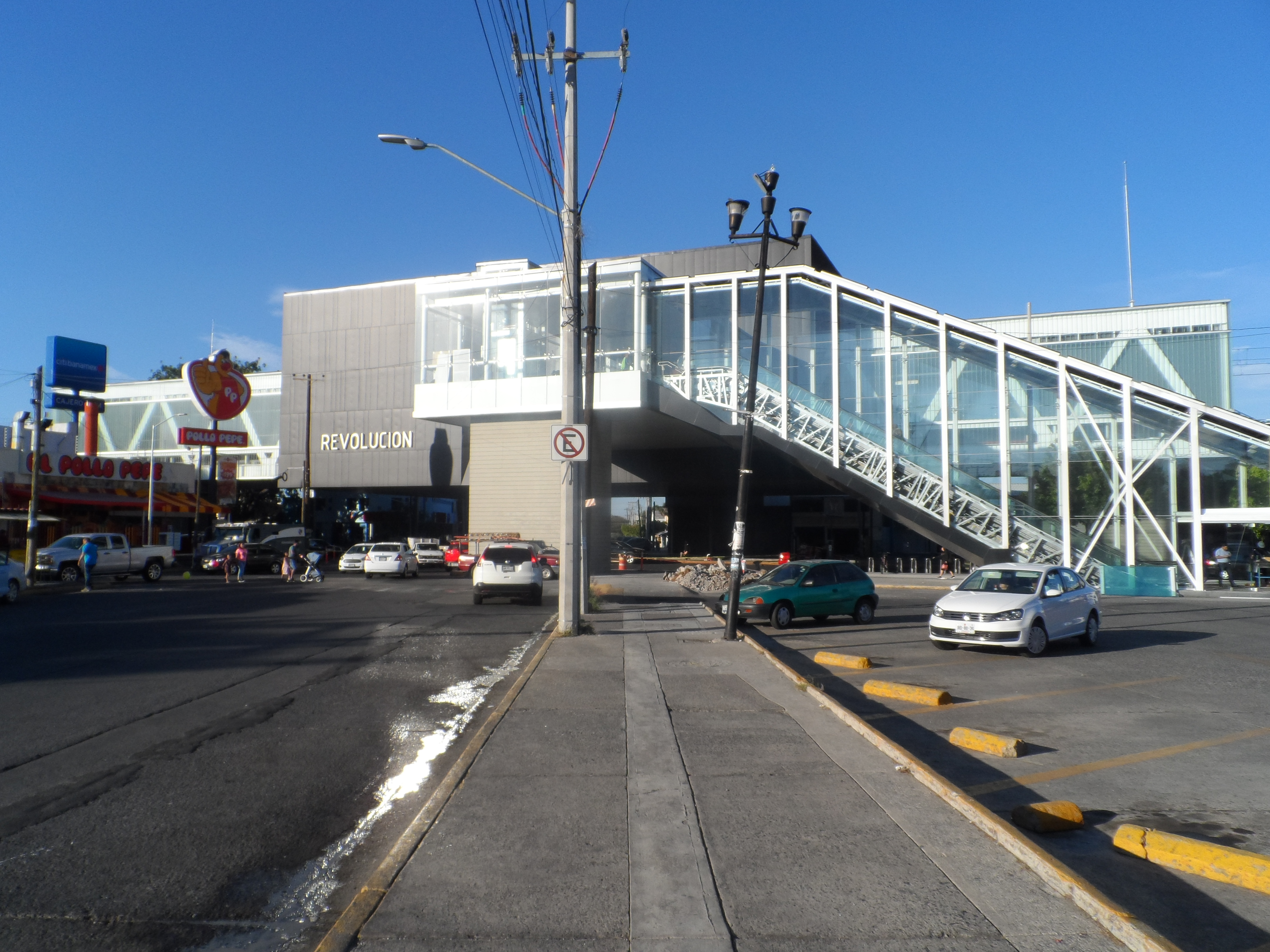
- The station's exterior in 2018

General information
- Location: Guadalajara; Jalisco, Mexico
- Coordinates: 20°39′03″N 103°18′37″W
- System: SITEUR light rail
- Line: 3

Construction
- Structure type: Elevated
- Cycle facilities: Yes
- Accessible: Yes

History
- Opened: 2020

Services
Preceding station	Sistema de Tren Eléctrico Urbano	Following station
CUCEI towards Arcos de Zapopan	Line 3	Río Nilo towards Central de Autobuses
Location

The Revolución railway station is the fifth station of Line 3 of the Sistema de Tren Eléctrico Urbano of Guadalajara from south-east to north-west, and fourteenth in the opposite direction.
