= Río Nilo metro station =

Light rail station in Guadalajara, Jalisco, Mexico

Río Nilo
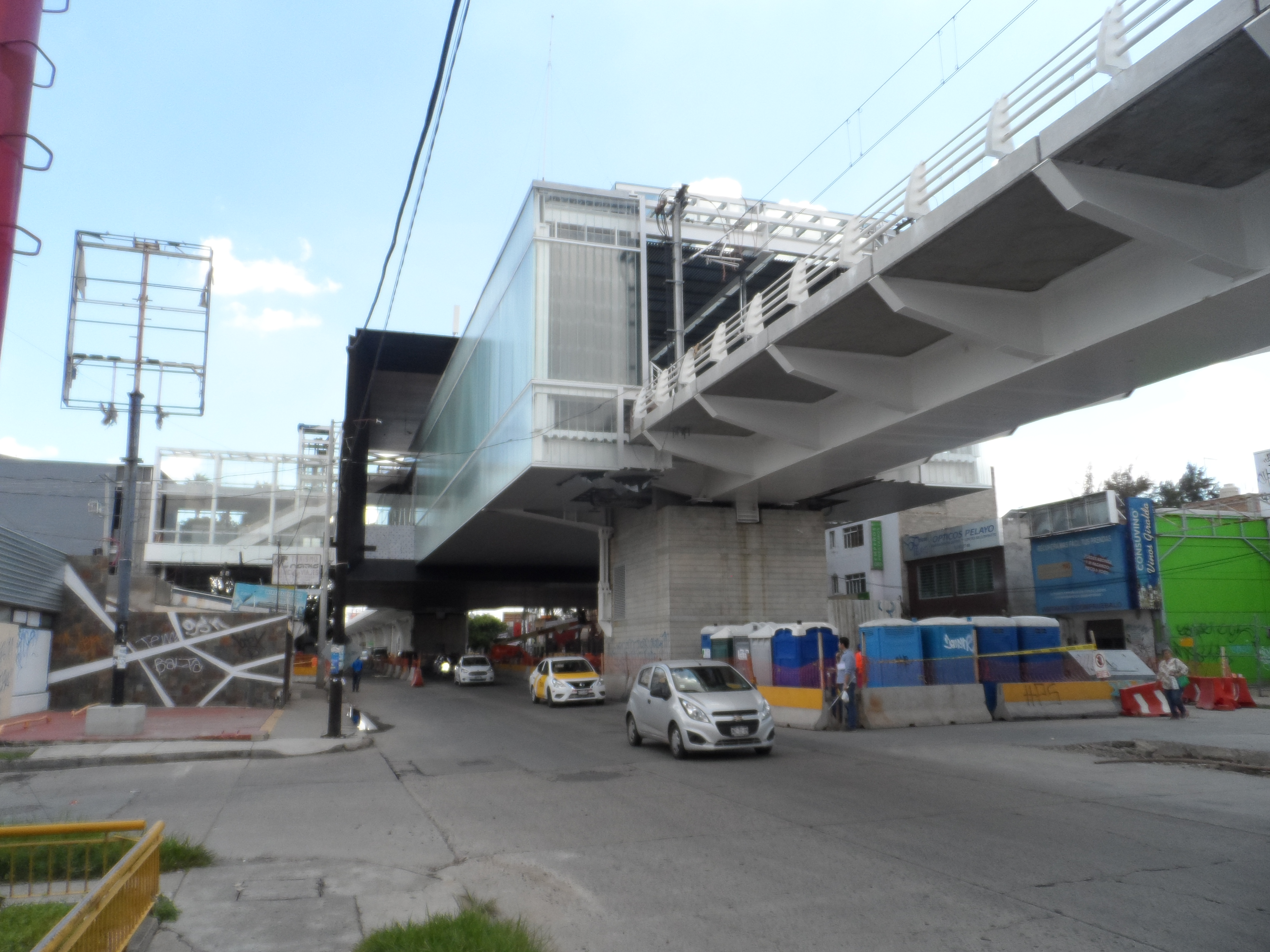
- The station's exterior in 2018

General information
- Location: Guadalajara; Jalisco, Mexico
- Coordinates: 20°38′41″N 103°18′05″W
- System: SITEUR light rail
- Line: 3

Construction
- Structure type: Elevated
- Cycle facilities: Yes
- Accessible: Yes

History
- Opened: 2020

Services
Preceding station	Sistema de Tren Eléctrico Urbano	Following station
Revolución towards Arcos de Zapopan	Line 3	Tlaquepaque Centro towards Central de Autobuses
Location

The Río Nilo railway station is the fourth station of Line 3 of the Sistema de Tren Eléctrico Urbano of Guadalajara from southeast to northwest, and 15th in the opposite direction.
