= Circunvalación Country metro station =

Light rail station in Guadalajara, Jalisco, Mexico

Circunvalación Country
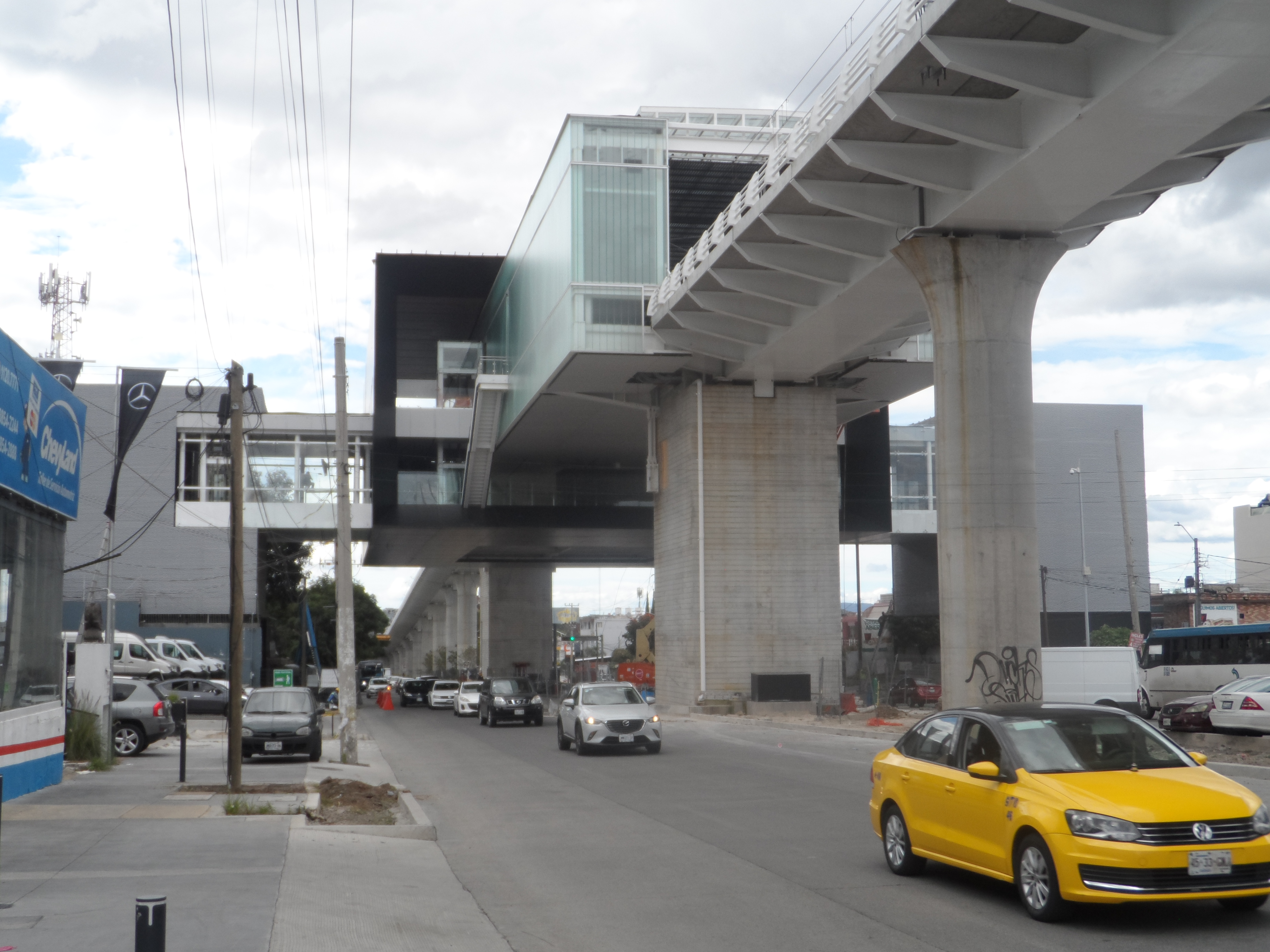
- The station's exterior in 2018

General information
- Location: Av. Manuel Ávila Camacho, Jardines del Country, 44210 Guadalajara; Jalisco, Mexico
- Coordinates: 20°42′23″N 103°21′58″W
- System: SITEUR light rail
- Line: 3

Construction
- Structure type: Elevated
- Cycle facilities: Yes
- Accessible: Yes

History
- Opened: 2020

Services
Preceding station	Sistema de Tren Eléctrico Urbano	Following station
Plaza Patria towards Arcos de Zapopan	Line 3	Ávila Camacho towards Central de Autobuses
Location

The Circunvalación Country railway station is the thirteenth station of Line 3 of the Sistema de Tren Eléctrico Urbano in Guadalajara, running from south-east to north-west, and the sixth in the opposite direction.
