= Ávila Camacho metro station =

Light rail station in Guadalajara, Jalisco, Mexico

Ávila Camacho
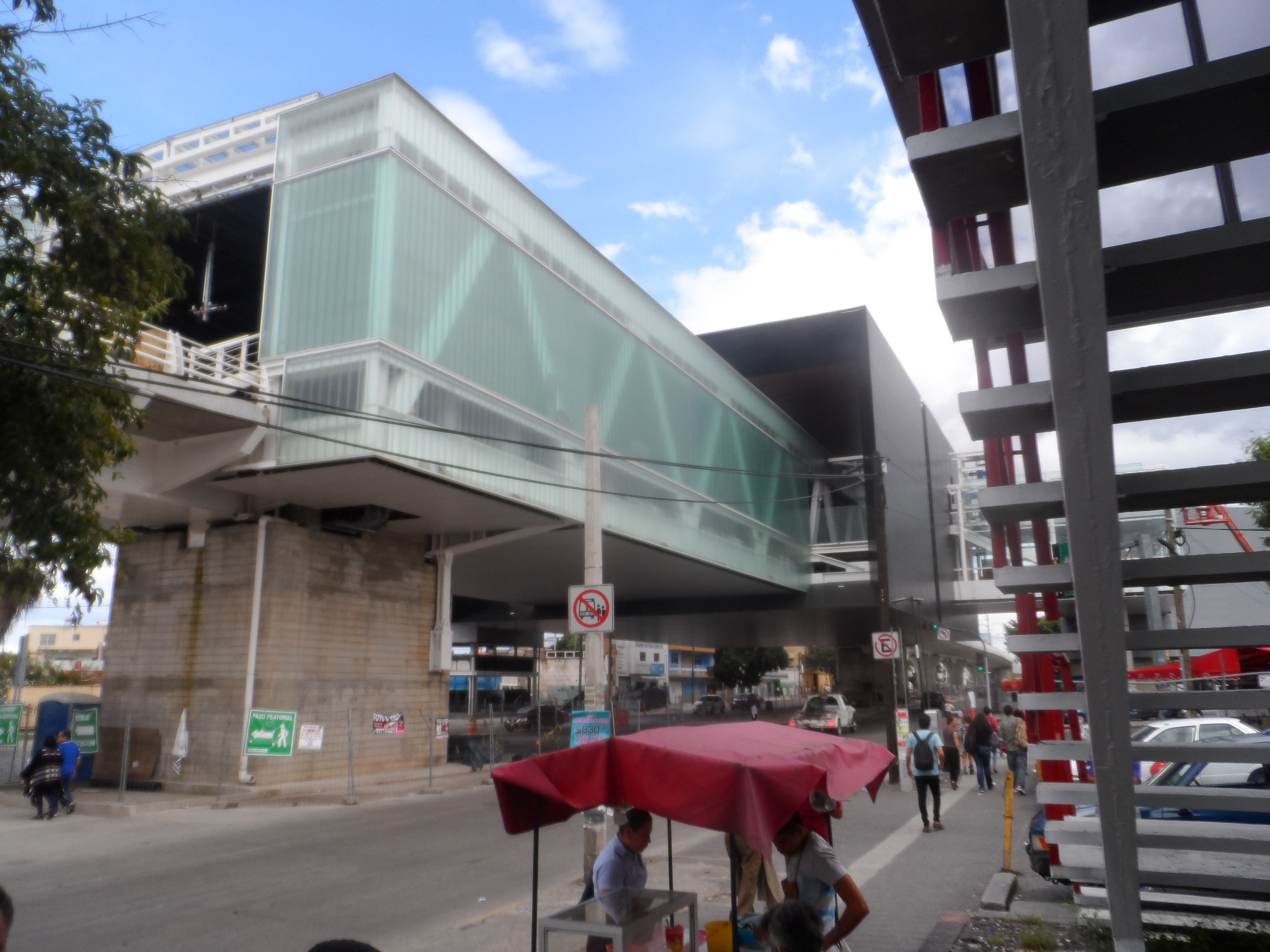
- Line 3 station's exterior in 2018

General information
- Location: Guadalajara; Jalisco, Mexico
- Coordinates: 20°41′55″N 103°21′18″W
- System: SITEUR light rail
- Lines: 1 and 3

Construction
- Structure type: Underground and elevated
- Cycle facilities: Yes
- Accessible: Yes

History
- Opened: Line 1: 1989; 37 years ago Line 3: 2020; 6 years ago

Services
Preceding station	Sistema de Tren Eléctrico Urbano	Following station
División del Norte towards Auditorio	Line 1	Mezquitán towards Periférico Sur
Circunvalación Country towards Arcos de Zapopan	Line 3	La Normal towards Central de Autobuses
Location

Ávila Camacho railway station is the interchange station between SITEUR's Lines 1 and 3 in Guadalajara, Jalisco.

The logo is a stylization of the presidential sash used by President Manuel Ávila Camacho during his six-year term 1940–1946; and takes its name from the homonymous avenue with which the underground section of line 1 crosses.

The station provides service to the San Miguel de Mezquitán, La Normal and Observatorio neighborhoods. Additionally, it is a strategic connection point in the city since it links with various bus routes in the city, which serve the municipalities of Zapopan and Guadalajara.

During the construction of line 3, it was intended that the elevated interchange station with line 1 be named Federalismo station, but during the final construction it was renamed Ávila Camacho station; therefore, both stations operate as one, the same as Juárez.

== Points of interest ==
- Urban Primary School María C. Reyes
- Plan de San Luis and Enrique Díaz de León avenues
- Federalismo cycleway, which runs from Manuel Ávila Camacho Av. until Circunvalación Agustín Yáñez Av
- San Miguel de Mezquitán Colony
- SNTE Section 47 Syndicate Offices
- San Miguel de Mezquitán Park & Parish

== Gallery ==
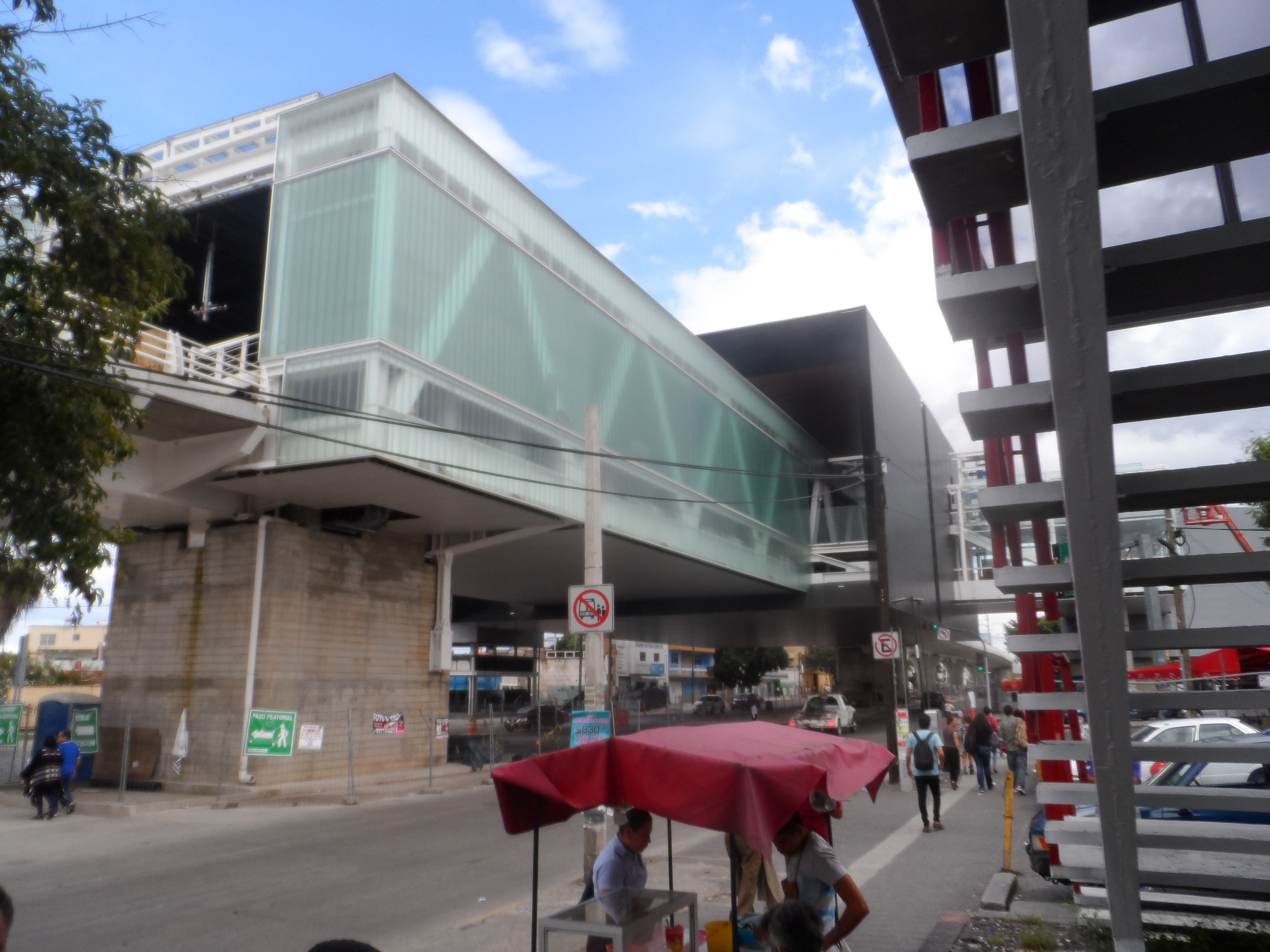
External view of the Ávila Camacho railway station of Line 3.

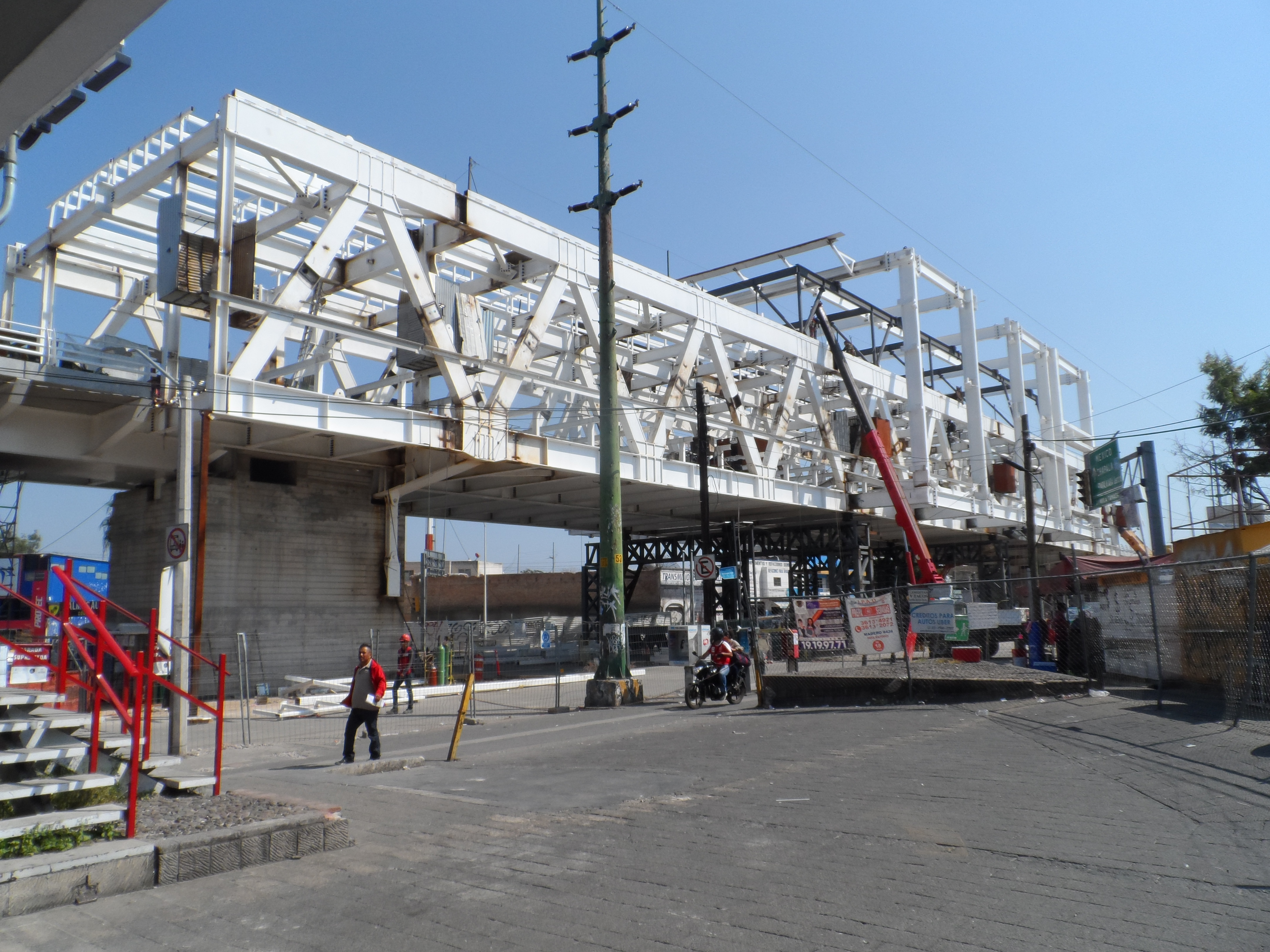
Line 3 Federalismo station as of November 3, 2017

Line 1 Ávila Camacho railway station logotype.

Line 3 Ávila Camacho railway station logotype. The red stripe indicates a connection with Line 1
