= Plaza Patria metro station =

Metro station in Jalisco, Mexico

Plaza Patria
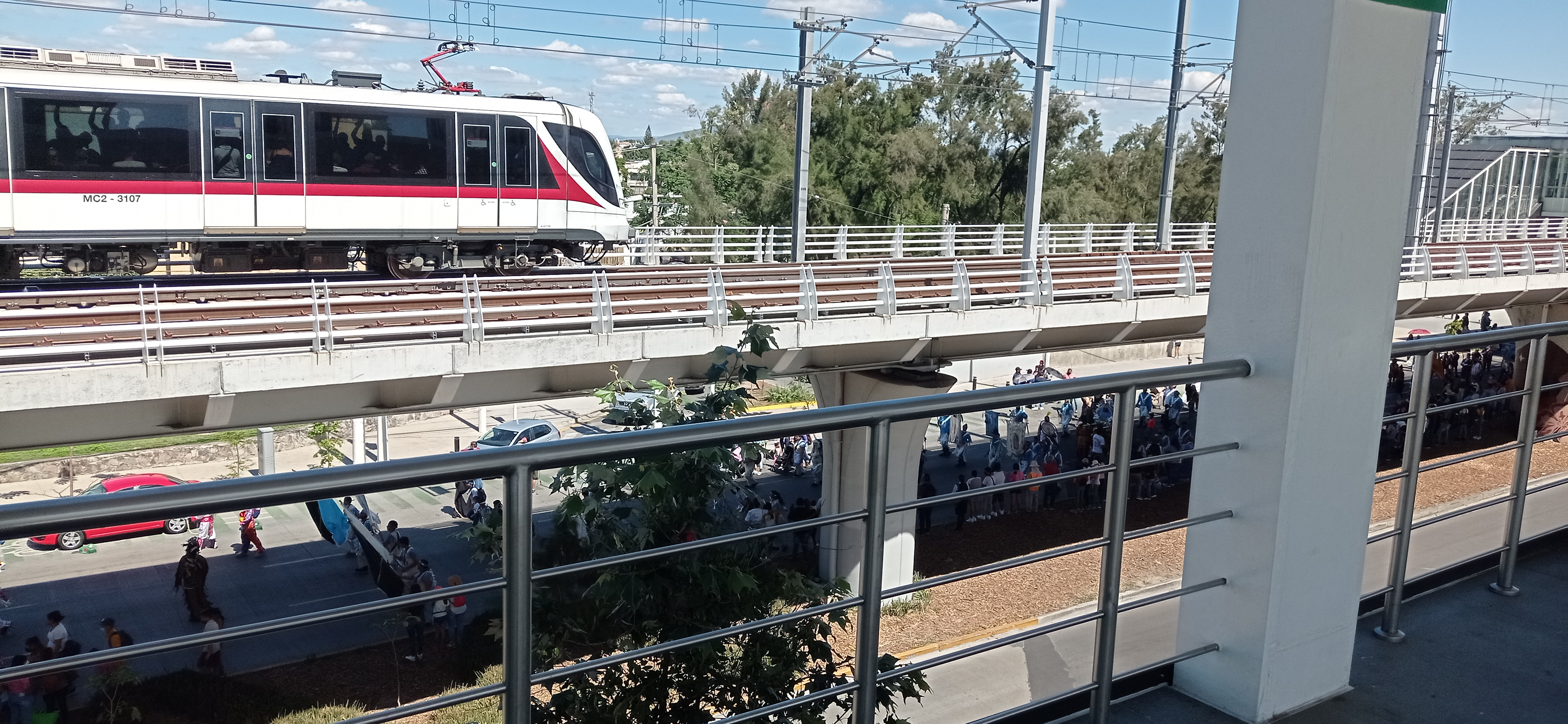
- The station exterior during the Pilgrimage of the Virgin of Zapopan of 2021

General information
- Location: Guadalajara; Jalisco, Mexico
- Coordinates: 20°43′14″N 103°23′13″W
- System: SITEUR light rail
- Line: 3

Construction
- Structure type: Elevated
- Cycle facilities: Yes
- Accessible: Yes

History
- Opened: 2020

Services
Preceding station	Sistema de Tren Eléctrico Urbano	Following station
Zapopan Centro towards Arcos de Zapopan	Line 3	Circunvalación Country towards Central de Autobuses
Location

Plaza Patria is the fourteenth station of Line 3 of the Guadalajara Urban Electric Train System from south-east to north-west, and the fifth in the opposite direction.

This station is located on the central median of Manuel Ávila Camacho avenue in front of the park of the same name, near the municipal limit with Zapopan and the Plaza Patria shopping centre, from which it takes its name.

On 25 July 2015, due to the works on Viaduct 1 of Line 3, the Puerta de Ingreso a Zapopan pedestrian bridge was dismantled piece by piece, the work of sculptor Fernando González Gortázar. The bridge was previously located at the intersection of Ávila Camacho and Patria avenues.

After its dismantling, in October of the same year, the municipal president of Zapopan, Pablo Lemus, stated that the government was unaware of the location of its pieces. Yet still, El Informador announced that this, along with other monuments retired by line 3 works, were located stored in a property in the El Vigía neighborhood, in Zapopan. Likewise, the former director of Citizen Participation, Emilio Laso, stated that the directorates of Heritage, Citizen Participation and the Private Secretariat were aware of the whereabouts of the bridge.

It was planned to erect the monument on Prolongación Américas in front of a shopping center with which the matter would be consulted. However, the bridge has not been reinstalled.

The station logo is three pine trees, representing the pine trees that were before Plaza Patria, in addition to the current proximity of the Plaza Patria shopping centre to the Los Colomos forest.

== Points of interest ==
- Plaza Patria shopping centre
- Pan-American volleyball complex
- Ávila Camacho park
- Science Institute (Instituto de Ciencias) [Jesuit College of Guadalajara]

== Gallery ==
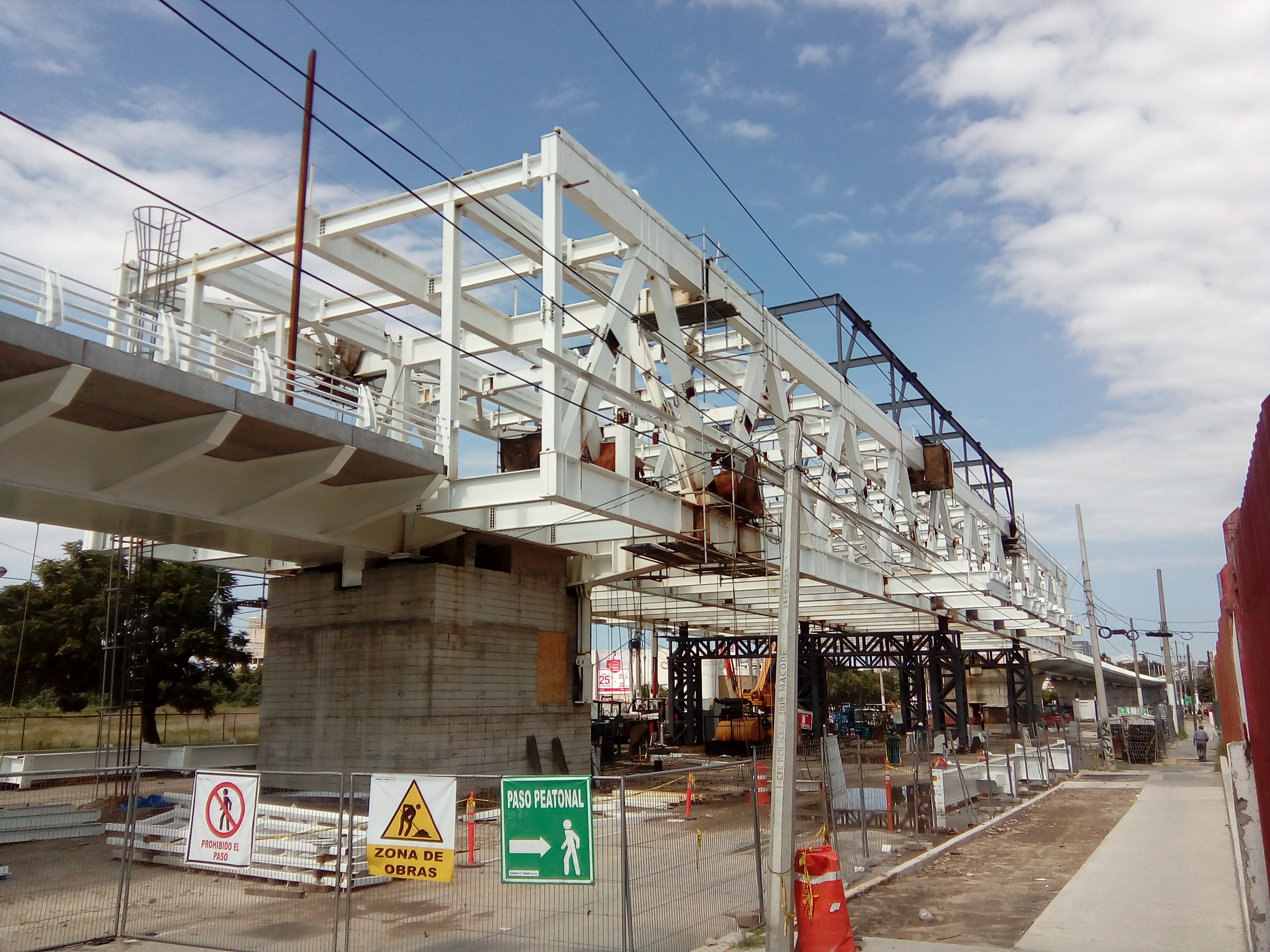
The station during its construction in April 2017.

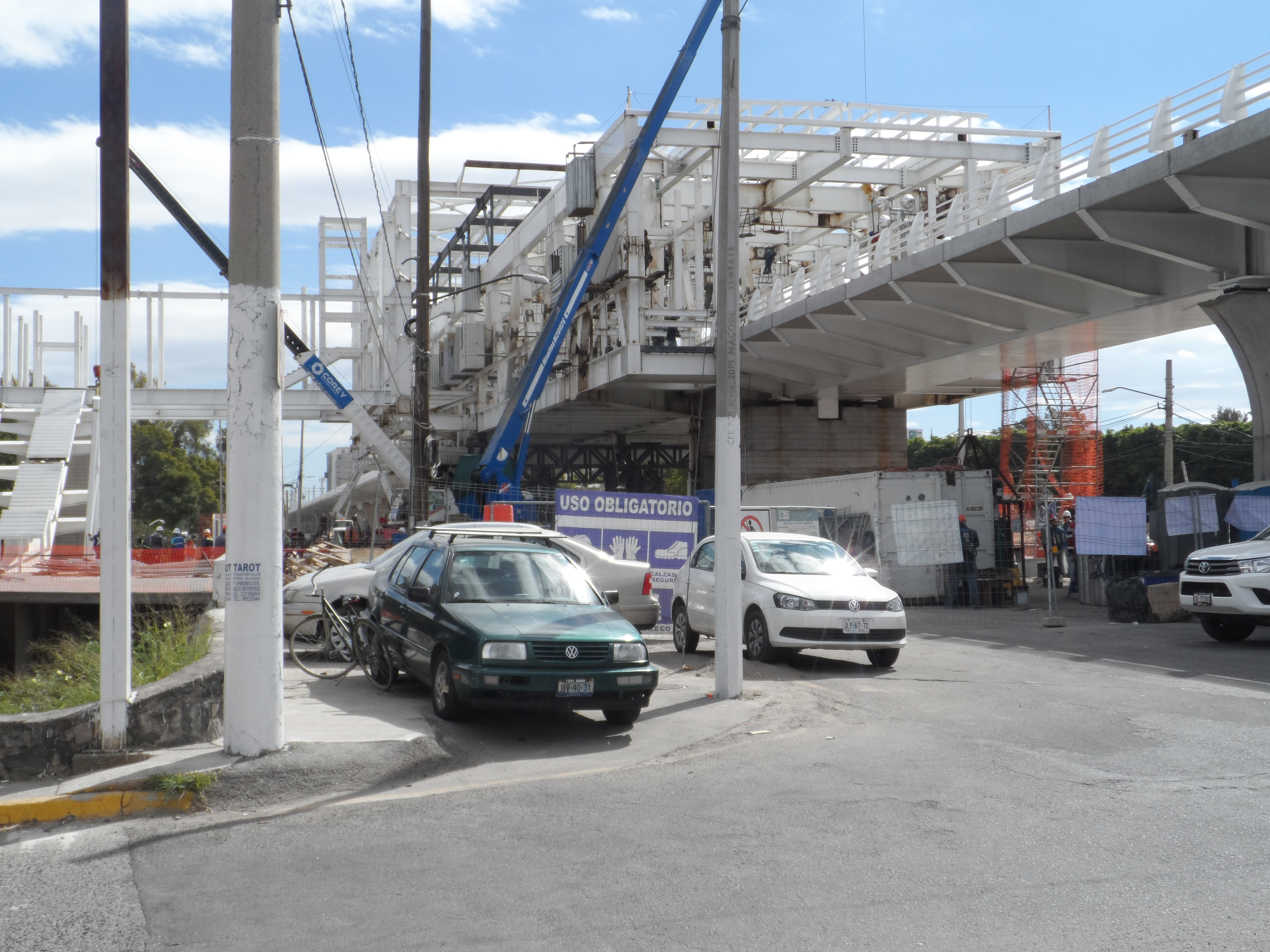
The station during its construction in December 2017.

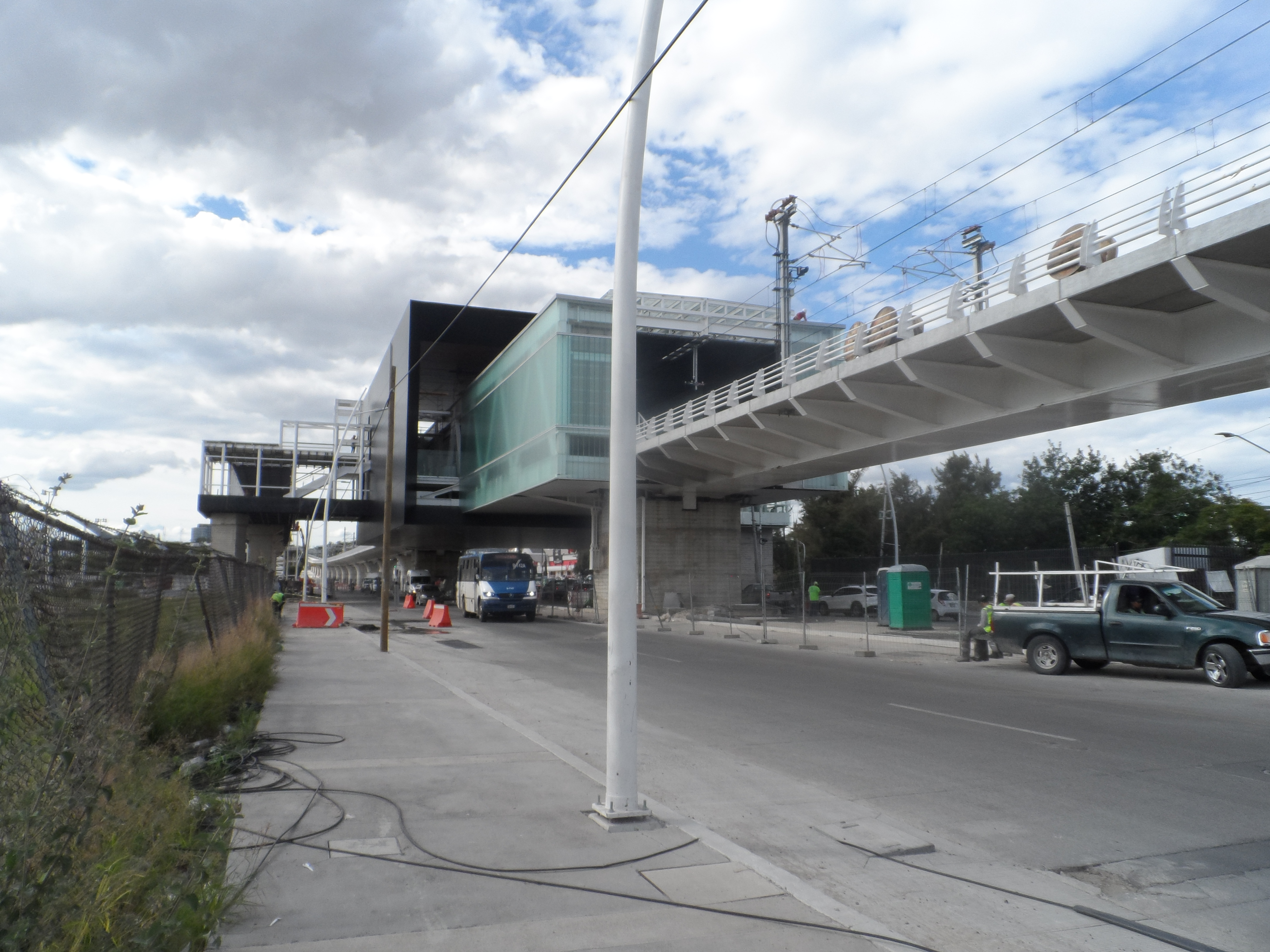
External view of the station from the south.

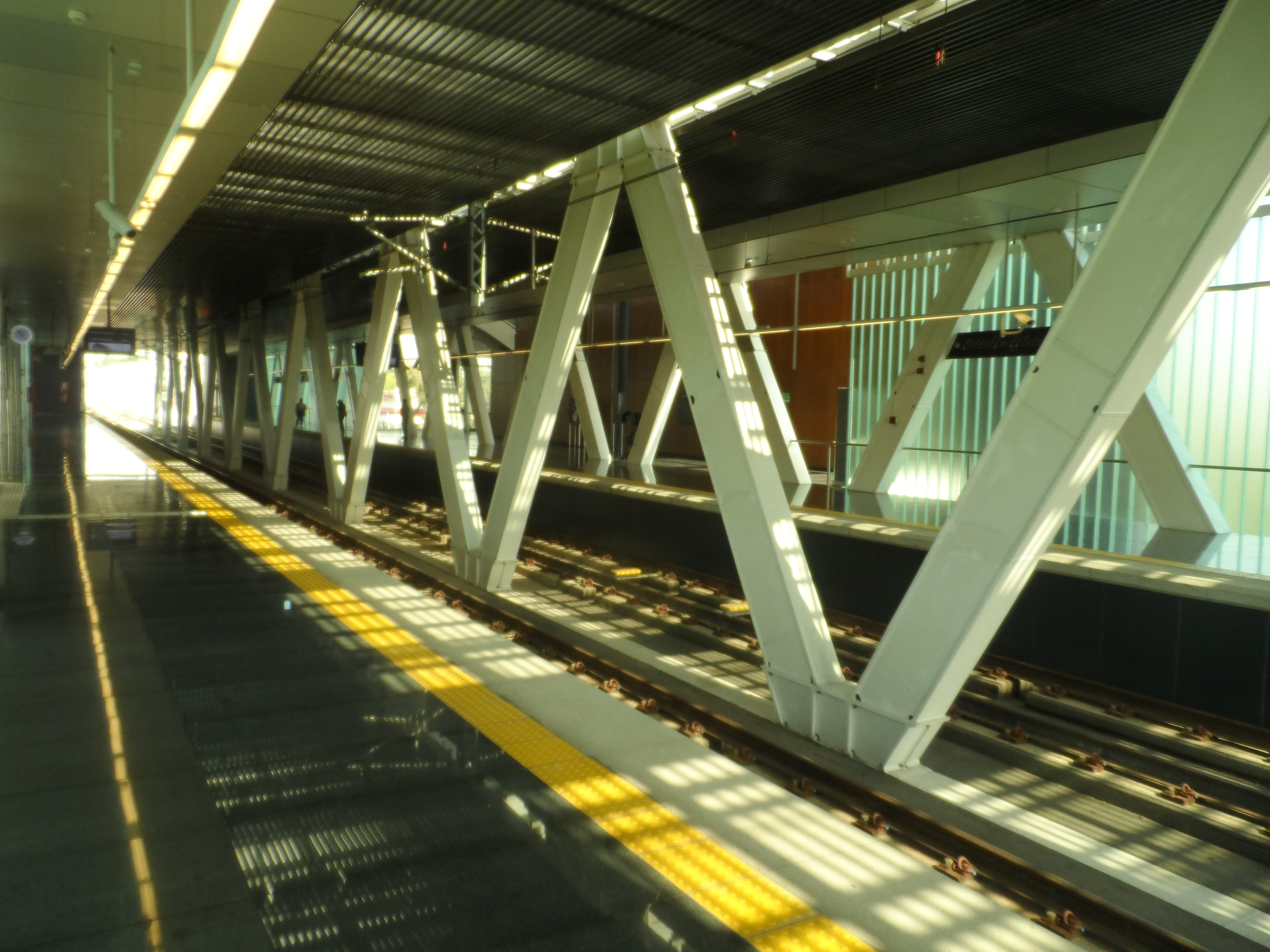
Station platforms.
