= Tlaquepaque Centro metro station =

Light rail station in Tlaquepaque, Jalisco, Mexico

Tlaquepaque Centro
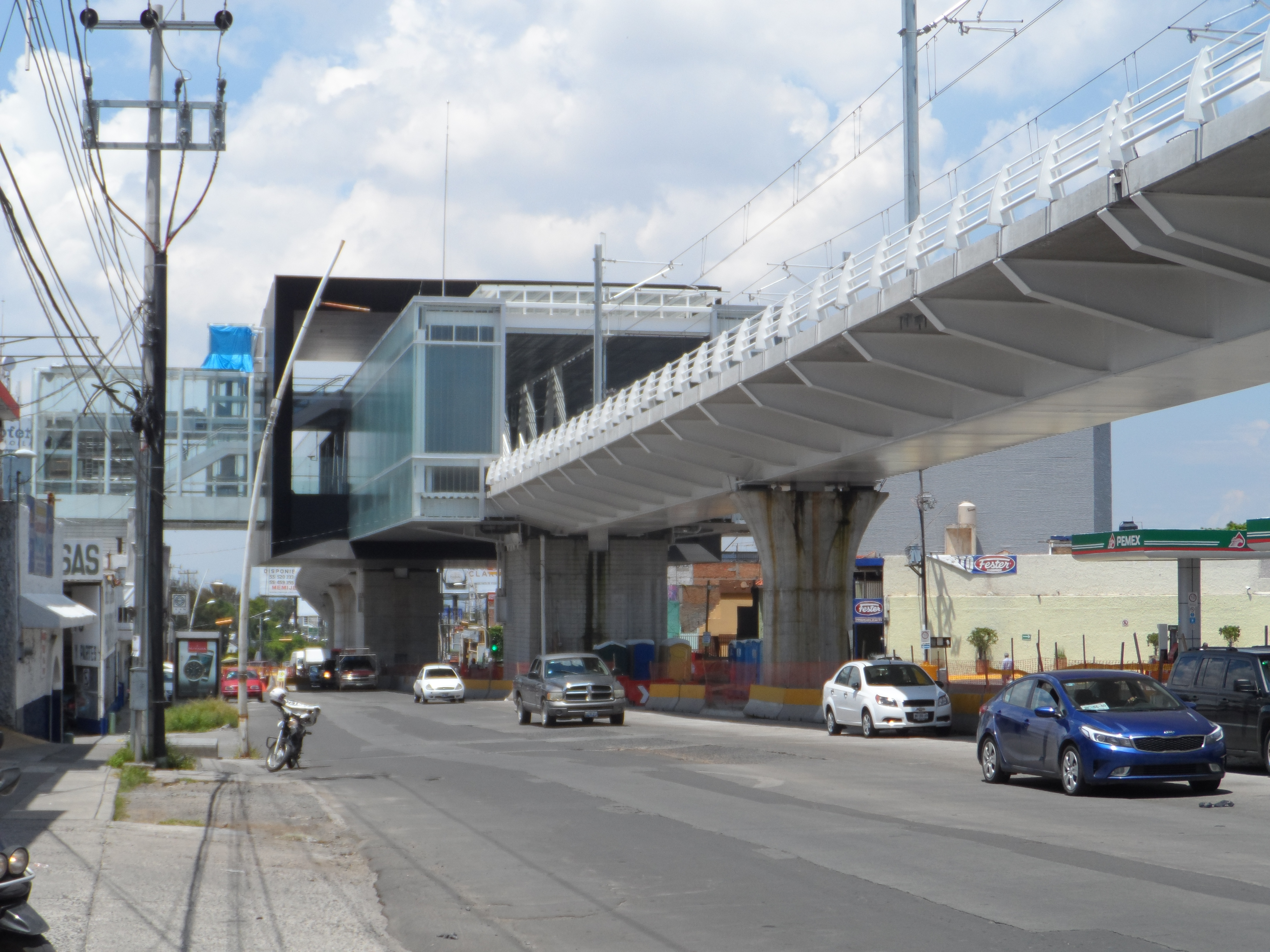
- The station's exterior in 2018

General information
- Location: Tlaquepaque; Jalisco, Mexico
- Coordinates: 20°38′15″N 103°18′00″W
- System: SITEUR light rail
- Line: 3

Construction
- Structure type: Elevated
- Cycle facilities: Yes
- Accessible: Yes

History
- Opened: 2020

Services
| Preceding station | Sistema de Tren Eléctrico Urbano | Following station |
|---|---|---|
| Río Nilo towards Arcos de Zapopan | Line 3 | Lázaro Cárdenas towards Central de Autobuses |
Location

The Tlaquepaque Centro railway station is the third station of Line 3 of the Sistema de Tren Eléctrico Urbano of Guadalajara from south-east to north-west, and sixteenth in the opposite direction.

A 2018 analysis identified 837 economic establishments near the station, similar to the two other stations in Tlaquepaque.
