= Mercado del Mar metro station =

Railway station in Zapopan, Mexico

Mercado del Mar
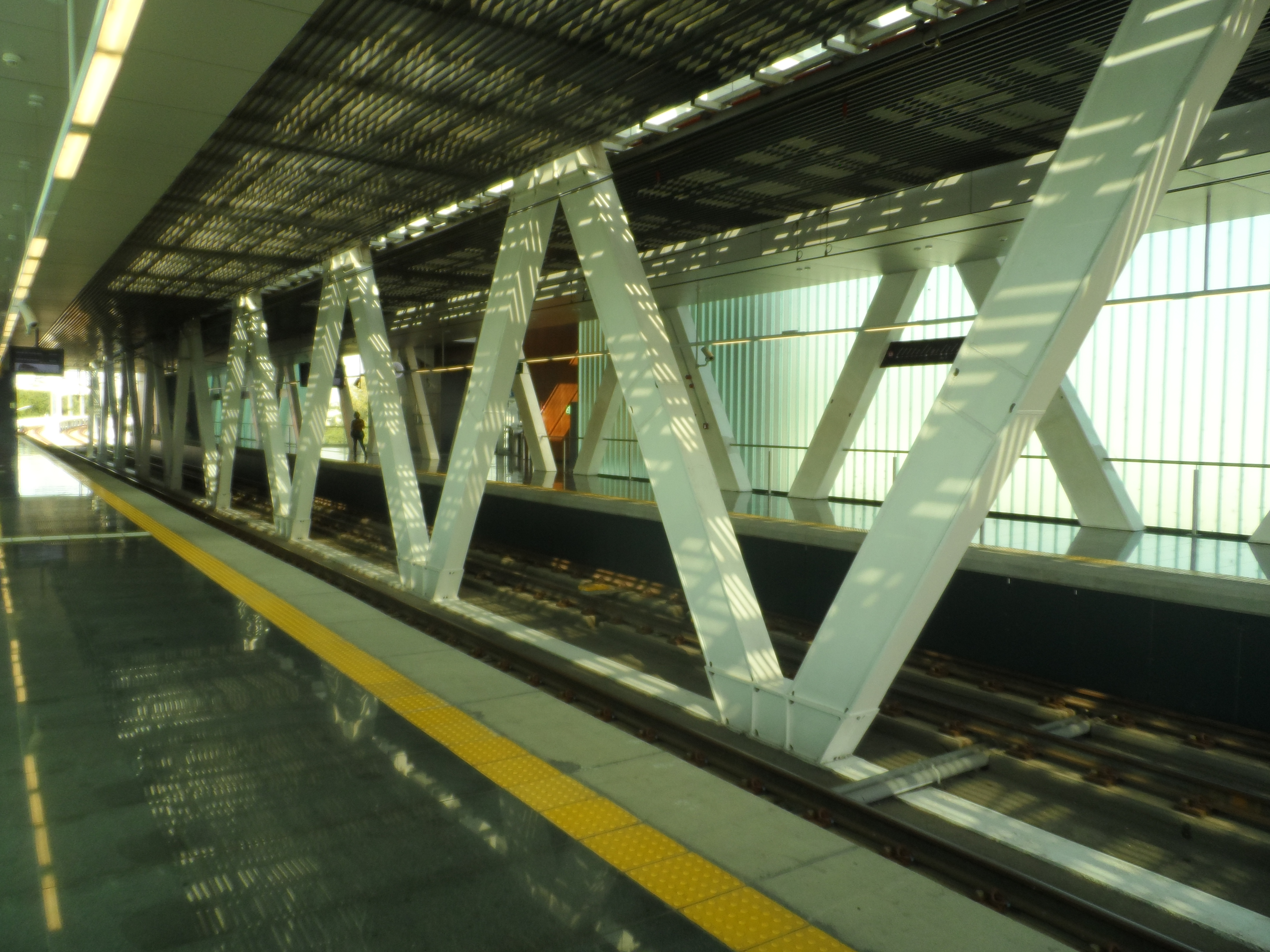
- Platforms of the Mercado del Mar railway station

General information
- Location: Juan Pablo II Av. and José Parres Arias Av., Zapopan; Jalisco, Mexico
- Coordinates: 20°43′44″N 103°23′21″W
- System: SITEUR light rail
- Line: Line 3
- Platforms: 2 side platforms
- Tracks: 2

Construction
- Structure type: Elevated
- Cycle facilities: Yes
- Accessible: Yes

History
- Opened: September 12, 2020
- Former names: Charros

Services
Preceding station	Sistema de Tren Eléctrico Urbano	Following station
Periférico Belenes towards Arcos de Zapopan	Line 3	Zapopan Centro towards Central de Autobuses
Location

Mercado del Mar is the sixteenth station of the Line 3 of the Sistema de Tren Eléctrico Urbano of Guadalajara from south-east to north-west and the third in the opposite direction.

== History and construction ==
Before the construction of the station, a monument to Emiliano Zapata (created by Juan José Méndez) was removed from the area; its whereabouts remains unclear. Another monument, but in honor to the Escuadrón 201 fighter squadron, was also removed and it was moved to a nearby location.

On June 25, 2018, during the construction of the line, the governor of Jalisco, Aristóteles Sandoval, announced that the station name would be Estación Charros, in honour to the local baseball team Charros de Jalisco, whose home stadium (the Estadio Panamericano de Béisbol) is near the station. The name was later replaced by the requests of Rosa Mosqueda and Ernesto Márquez, both representants of the Mercado del Mar Zapopan and of the Asociación de Productores y Comerciantes de Pescados y Mariscos de Jalisco A.C., respectively. The chosen name became Estación Mercado del Mar just like it was originally proposed in 2014. The construction of Line 3 of the Guadalajara light rail system started at this station in August 2014. By August 2017, Mercado del Mar station was the first one to be completed in a structural manner. By February 2020, construction of the internal structure and equipment continued to affect the roadway.

This station is located on the vial node where the following avenues converge: Av. Juan Pablo II from Zapopan, Av. José Parres Arias and Prol. Pino Suárez, as well as the López Cotilla and Pino Suárez Streets, all of which overall drive from and towards the Zapopan historic centre. The logotype of the station is a swordfish leaping out of the water with a wale behind submerging.

== Controversy ==
In May 2017, the girders of the steepest curve were being installed in the First Viaduct placed between the Mercado del Mar and Zapopan Centro stations. At the beginning of the earlier month (April), the Superior Auditor of the Federation (ASF) warned security risks on said curve which measures 105 metres; such failure was compared to the one presented by the Line 12 of the Mexico City Metro, but the Secretariat of Communications and Transport (SCT) cleared that there was no point of comparison between both infrastructures because different materials were employed.

== Points of interest ==
- Mercado del Mar (sea market), in Zapopan
- Telmex Auditorium
- Los Belenes (CUCEA and Preparatory Nº. 10 of the University of Guadalajara, Juan José Arreola Public Library of the State of Jalisco).
- Estadio Panamericano de Béisbol, of the Charros de Jalisco team.
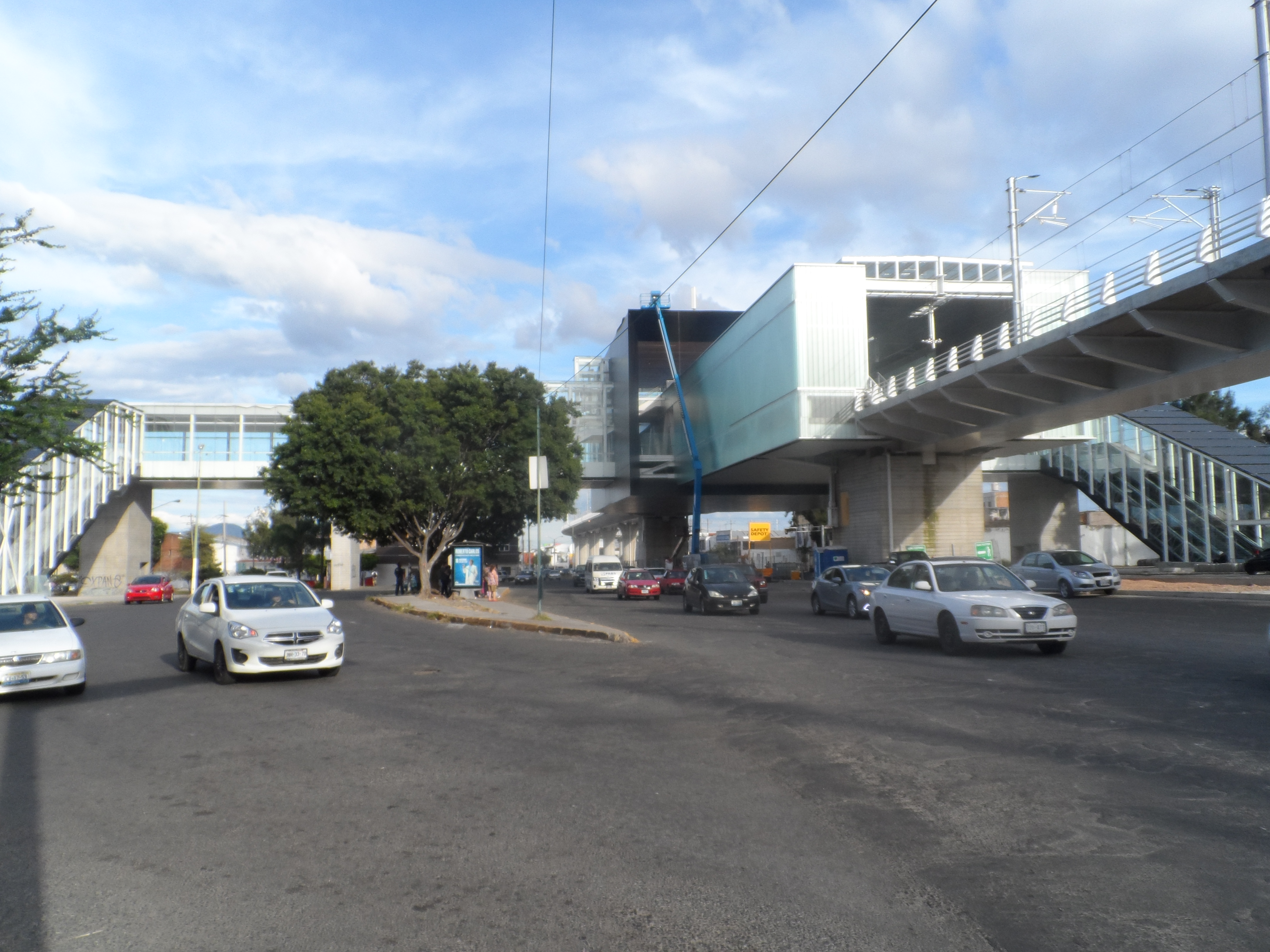
External view of the Mercado del Mar station

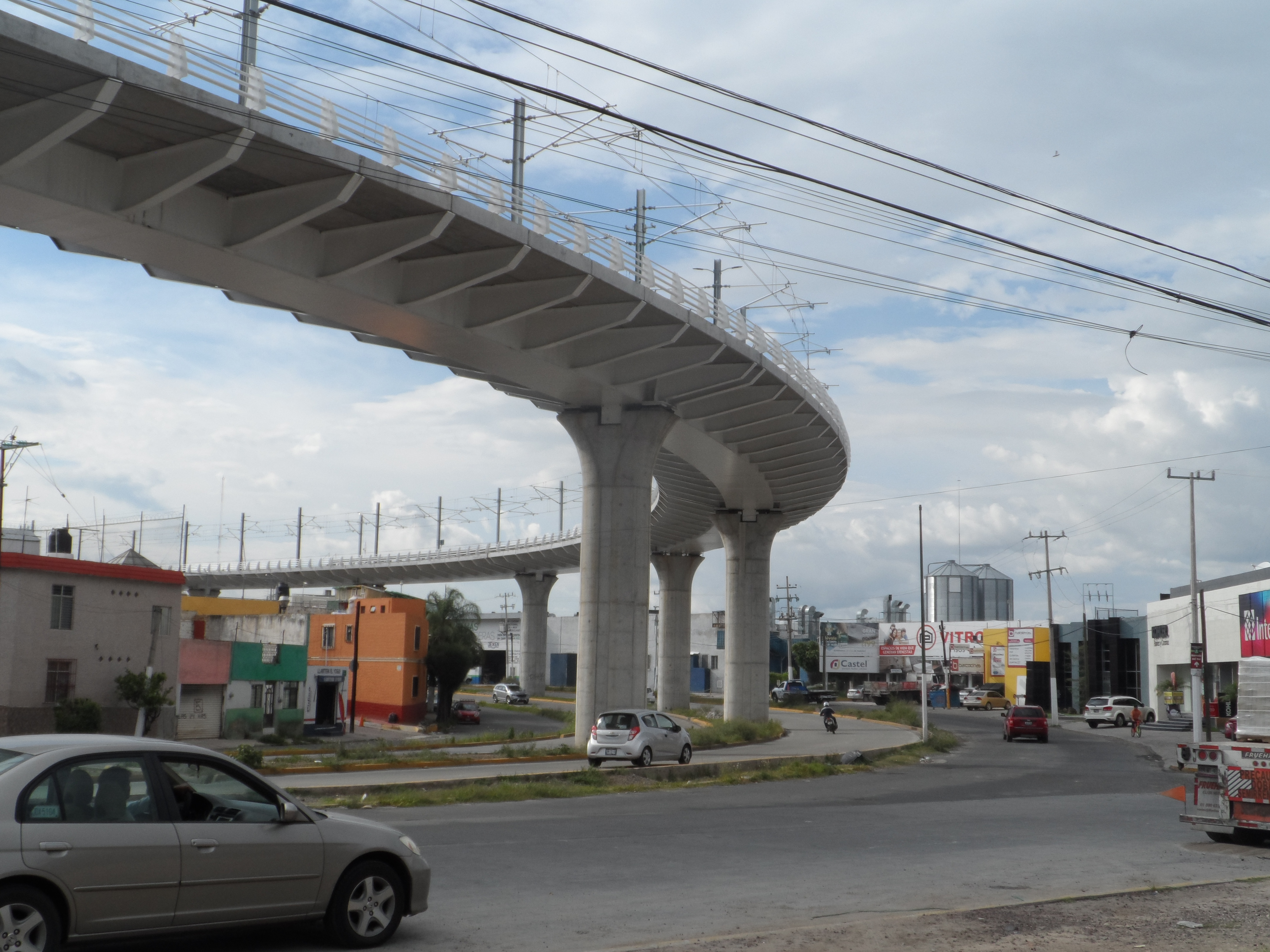
Steep turn of the First Viaduct, over the Juan Pablo II Avenue, between the Mercado del Mar y Zapopan Centro stations
