= Lázaro Cárdenas (disambiguation) =

Lázaro Cárdenas was President of Mexico from 1934 to 1940.

Lázaro Cárdenas may also refer to:

- Lázaro Cárdenas Batel, governor of Michoacán from 2002 to 2008
- Lázaro Cárdenas, Baja California, Mexico
- Lázaro Cárdenas, Michoacán, Mexico
  - Port of Lázaro Cárdenas
- Lázaro Cárdenas Municipality, Quintana Roo, Mexico
- Lázaro Cárdenas Municipality, Tlaxcala, Mexico
- Lázaro Cárdenas, Jalisco, Mexico
- Lázaro Cárdenas Airport, in Michoacán, Mexico
- Lázaro Cárdenas metro station (Mexico City), Mexico
- Lázaro Cárdenas metro station (Tlaquepaque), Jalisco, Mexico
- Lázaro Cárdenas Elementary School, a K-8 school of the Chicago Public Schools in Little Village, Chicago

== See also ==
- Statue of Lázaro Cárdenas (disambiguation)
