= Plaza de la Bandera metro station =

Light rail station in Guadalajara, Jalisco, Mexico

Plaza de la Bandera
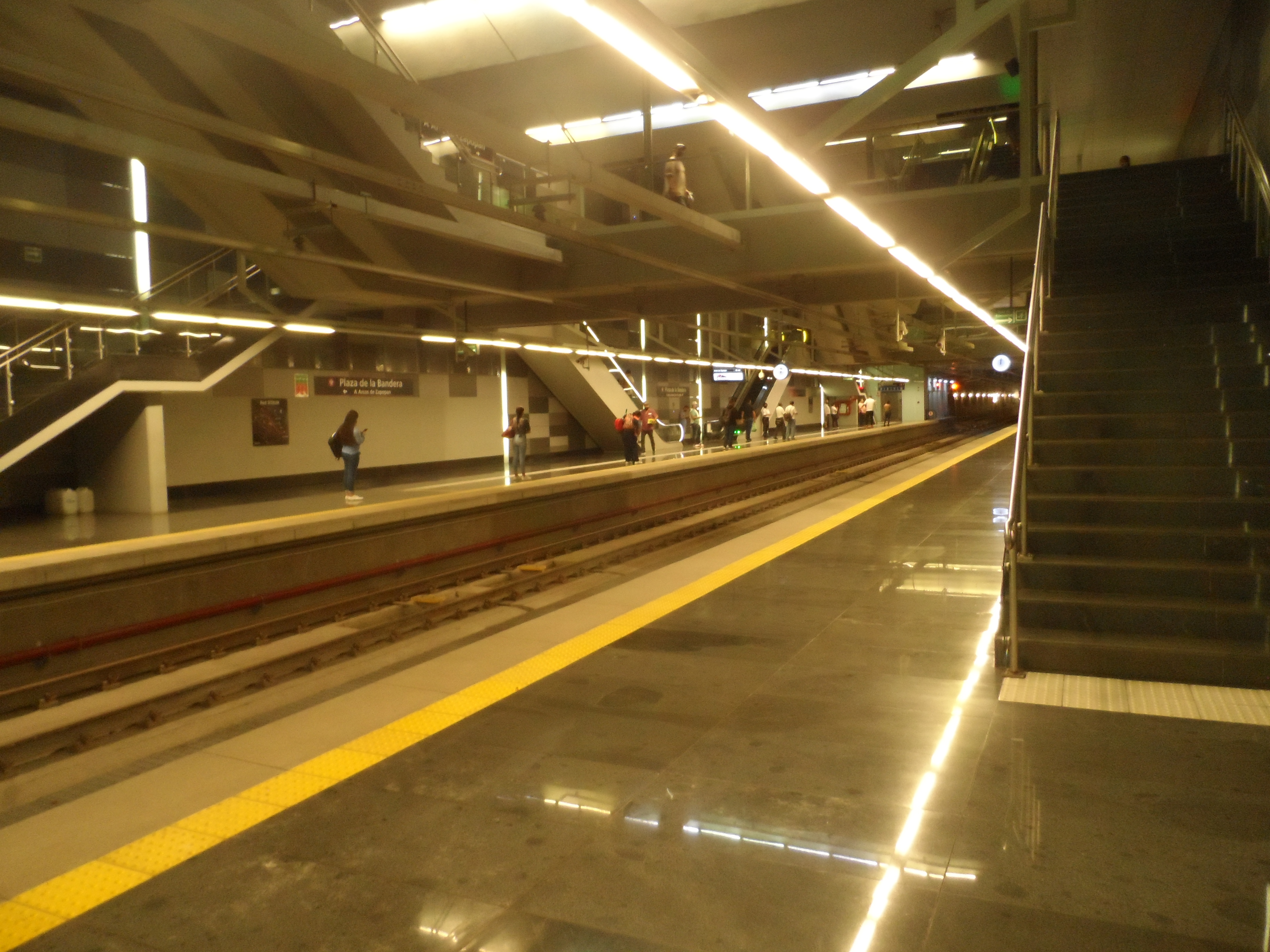
- The station's platforms in 2021

General information
- Location: Guadalajara; Jalisco, Mexico
- Coordinates: 20°39′54″N 103°19′58″W
- System: SITEUR light rail
- Line: 3

Construction
- Structure type: Underground
- Cycle facilities: Yes
- Accessible: Yes

History
- Opened: 2020

Services
Preceding station	Sistema de Tren Eléctrico Urbano	Following station
Independencia towards Arcos de Zapopan	Line 3	CUCEI towards Central de Autobuses
Location

The Plaza de la Bandera railway station is the seventh station of Line 3 of the Sistema de Tren Eléctrico Urbano of Guadalajara from south-east to north-west, and twelfth in the opposite direction.
