= Statue of Lázaro Cárdenas =

The statue of Lázaro Cárdenas may refer to:

- Statue of Lázaro Cárdenas (Madrid), Spain
- Statue of Lázaro Cárdenas (Puerto Vallarta), Mexico

== See also ==
- Lázaro Cárdenas (disambiguation)
- Bust of Lázaro Cárdenas (Los Angeles), United States
- Monument to Lázaro Cárdenas, Mexico City
