= Glorieta La Normal =

Roundabout in Guadalajara, Jalisco, Mexico

- Location: Guadalajara, Jalisco, Mexico
- Location within Mexico
- Coordinates: 20°41′43″N 103°20′55″W

Glorieta La Normal (or Glorieta de La Normal) is a roundabout in Guadalajara, in the Mexican state of Jalisco. The area is serviced by the La Normal railway station.
