= Santuario metro station =

Light rail station in Guadalajara, Jalisco, Mexico

Santuario
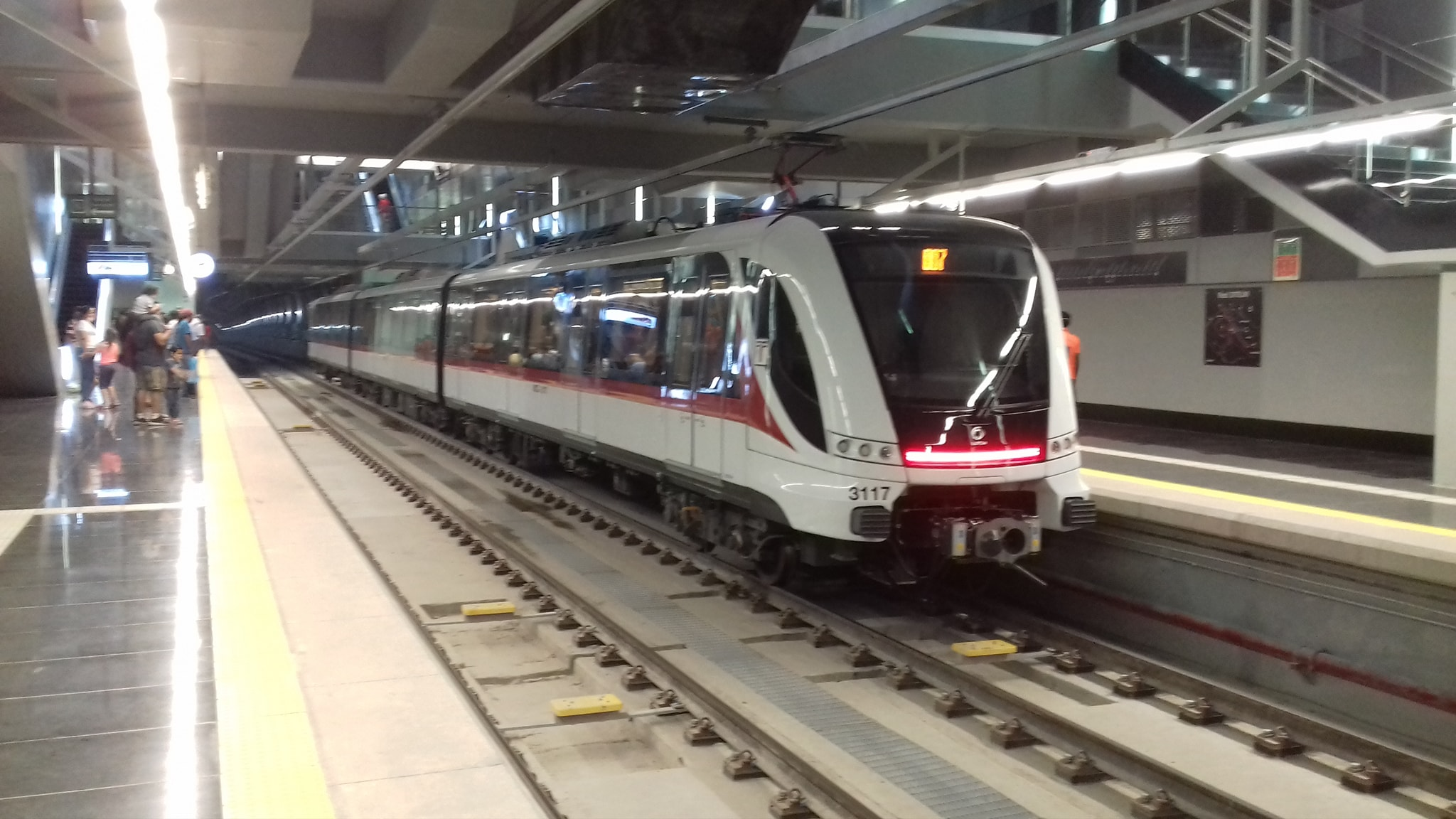
- The station in 2020

General information
- Location: Guadalajara; Jalisco, Mexico
- Coordinates: 20°41′03″N 103°20′52″W
- System: SITEUR light rail
- Line: 3

Construction
- Structure type: Underground
- Cycle facilities: Yes
- Accessible: Yes

History
- Opened: 2020

Services
| Preceding station | Sistema de Tren Eléctrico Urbano | Following station |
|---|---|---|
| La Normal towards Arcos de Zapopan | Line 3 | Guadalajara Centro towards Central de Autobuses |
Location

The Santuario railway station is the tenth station of Line 3 of the Sistema de Tren Eléctrico Urbano of Guadalajara from south-east to north-west, and the ninth in the opposite direction.
