= Line 3 (Sistema de Tren Eléctrico Urbano) =

Guadalajara metro line

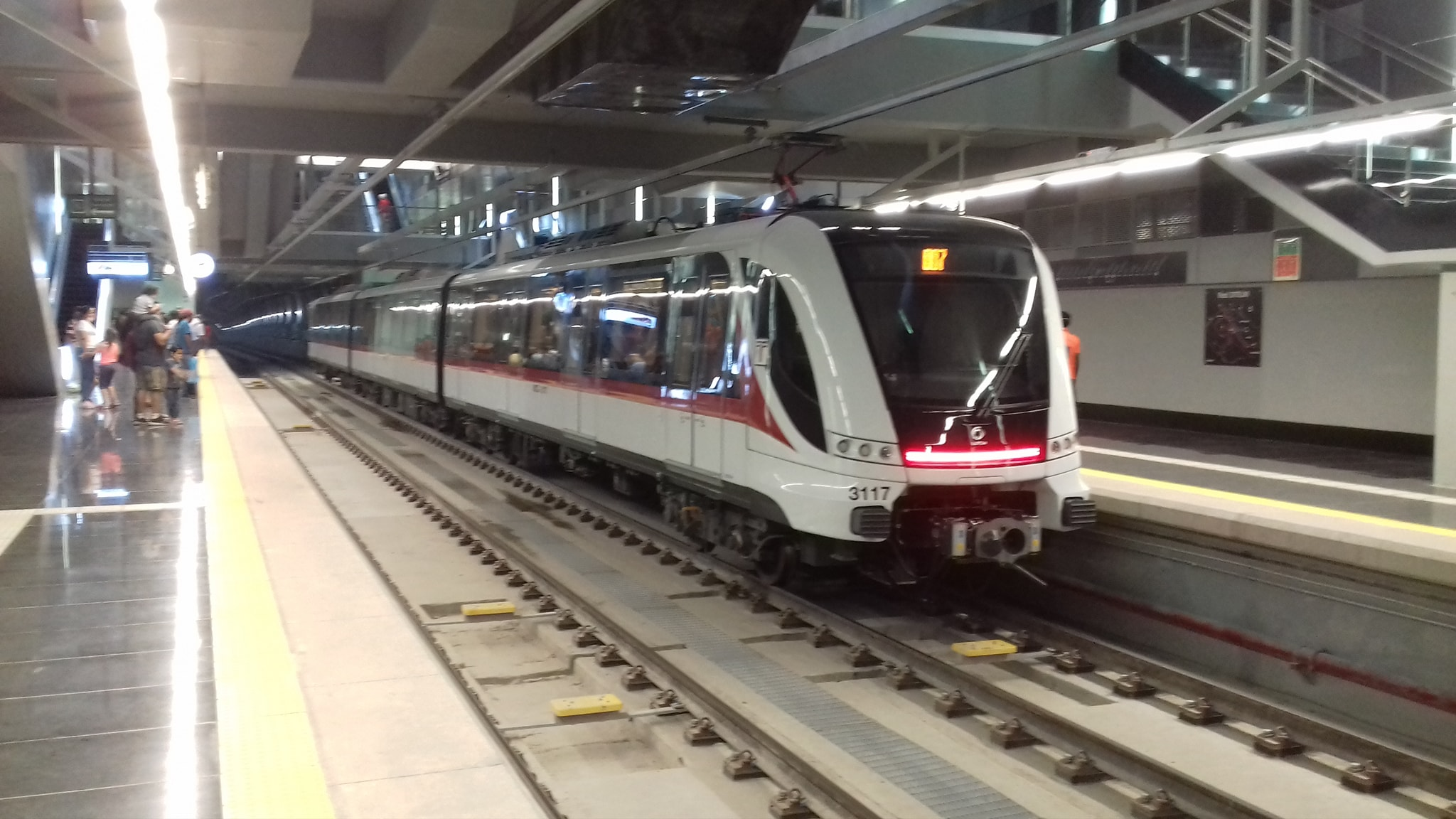
- Train at Santuario metro station of Line 3

Overview
- Native name: Línea 3 del Tren Eléctrico Urbano de Guadalajara
- Area served: Guadalajara, Tlaquepaque and Zapopan
- Locale: Jalisco
- Transit type: Rapid Transit
- Line number: 3
- Number of stations: 18
- Daily ridership: 233,000
- Website: siteur.gob.mx

Operation
- Began operation: 12 September 2020
- Operator: SITEUR
- Rolling stock: Alstom Metropolis
- Headway: 5 to 8 min

Technical
- System length: 21.5 km (13.4 mi)
- Track gauge: 1,435 mm (4 ft 8 1/2 in) standard gauge
- Average speed: 30 km/h (19 mph)
- Top speed: 70 km/h (43 mph)
Line 3 map

Line 3 of the Guadalajara Urban Electric Train System is the third public transport railway line in the Guadalajara metropolitan area (México) and currently its longest. The line connects the Historical Centres of Zapopan, Guadalajara and Tlaquepaque, through the Diagonal Metropolitan Vial Corridor; consisting of Juan Gil Preciado, Juan Pablo II, Manuel Ávila Camacho, Alcalde / 16 de Septiembre and Revolución / Francisco Silva Romero avenues, from the Arcos de Zapopan neighbourhood (in Zapopan) until the Central Camionera Oriente of Guadalajara (in Tlaquepaque). It has 18 stations from south-east to north-west, of which 13 are elevated (on 2 viaducts) and 5 are underground. It stretches along 21.5 km (13.4 mi) (red line, in the technical datasheet outline). It is estimated that the line moves 233,000 daily passengers.

== History ==
This infrastructure project was announced by Enrique Peña Nieto through the SCT as one out of five commitments that he promised at the beginning of his presidency in terms of railway transport.

Since August 7, 2014, when the construction of Line 3 began, it was foreseen that the line would be completed in mid-2017, but due to delays caused by budget changes, the line was actually inaugurated in September 2020. The Tunnel-Boring Machine (hereafter TBM) La Tapatia, which belongs to the Spanish company Sacyr, drilled to a maximum depth of 30 meters (98 ft) from La Normal with the aim of completing the underground section in Plaza de la Bandera.

On October 18, the length of the built tunnel reached 2,820 meters (9,250 ft) — out of a total of 4,005 meters (13,140 ft)—(without including the sections that connect with the viaducts or the length of both mentioned stations), with a diameter of 11.5 meters (38 ft).

"La Tapatía" resumed its advance after surpassing muddy ground between the Catedral and Independencia stations; the reason for which was Rodolfo Guadalajara, head of SITEUR, trusted that the excavation would not face any more technical issues and that it would complete before finishing 2017. More concretely, Salvador Fernández Ayala -representative of the SCT in Jalisco- said to local media that the TBM would complete the work in December 2017 and that the line 3 would start operating at the beginning of June or July 2018.

Yet, "La Tapatía" completed the tunnel in May 2018, which hinted that the work would not be completed before the end of the presidential administration during which it was started.

Finally, the governor, Enrique Alfaro Ramírez, announced in August 27 that the construction and tests of line 3 would finish in August 30, and it actually was ready to start operations on September 1, just like the president and governor had committed. But the governor remarked that, in order to open to the public, they were waiting for the president, Andrés Manuel López Obrador, to do the inauguration. This happened on September 12, when, around 11:00 A.M., the president inaugurated the line, and, afterward, it was open to the public after 4 P.M.

== Timeline of works ==
After the start of work in 2014, its estimated date of completion was originally planned to be in 2016; which would suggest a build time of only two years, and given the scale of the project, sounded very unrealistic. As the works progressed, the estimated completion date was delayed until December 2017 and then until March, May, July, or even September 2018. Nevertheless, during the mandates of Enrique Peña Nieto -president of the republic- and Jorge Aristóteles Sandoval Díaz - governor of the state of Jalisco - who started the execution of the works, the works were not completed and they could only do a "symbolic inauguration of technical tests", several days before ending their mandates on 1 and 5 December 2018, respectively.

It was the mandataries Andrés Manuel López Obrador, president of the nation, and Enrique Alfaro Ramírez, governor of the state of Jalisco, who had to inaugurate Line 3 of the Electric Train.

== Stations ==
The 18 stations of this line are listed by name and include geographic reference points and/or tourist attractions; some even have multilingual references for non-Spanish-speaking foreigners.

Logo	Name	Opening	Municipality	Transfer	Location
	Arcos de Zapopan	September 12, 2020	Zapopan	-	Elevated
	Periférico Belenes	September 12, 2020	Zapopan	Mi Macro Periférico	Elevated
	Mercado del Mar	September 12, 2020	Zapopan	-	Elevated
	Zapopan Centro	September 12, 2020	Zapopan	-	Elevated
	Plaza Patria	September 12, 2020	Guadalajara	-	Elevated
	Circunvalación Country	September 12, 2020	Guadalajara	-	Elevated
	Ávila Camacho	September 12, 2020	Guadalajara	Line 1 of the Guadalajara light rail system	Elevated
	La Normal	September 12, 2020	Guadalajara	-	Underground
	Santuario	September 12, 2020	Guadalajara	-	Underground
	Guadalajara Centro	September 12, 2020	Guadalajara	Line 2 of the Guadalajara light rail system	Underground
	Independencia	September 12, 2020	Guadalajara	Mi Macro Calzada	Underground
	Plaza de la Bandera	September 12, 2020	Guadalajara	-	Underground
	CUCEI	September 12, 2020	Guadalajara	-	Elevated
	Revolución	September 12, 2020	Guadalajara	-	Elevated
	Río Nilo	September 12, 2020	Guadalajara	-	Elevated
	Tlaquepaque Centro	September 12, 2020	San Pedro Tlaquepaque	-	Elevated
	Lázaro Cárdenas	September 12, 2020	San Pedro Tlaquepaque	-	Elevated
	Central de Autobuses	September 12, 2020	San Pedro Tlaquepaque	-	Elevated

== Constituent sections ==
Viaduct 1 (elevated section):

Starts in the Municipality of Zapopan; through Juan Gil Preciado Av. (Road to Tesistán) on its crossing with Arco del Triunfo Av. (Arcos de Zapopan station), Juan Pablo II Av. (Periférico Belenes, Mercado del Mar and Zapopan Centro stations), and Manuel Ávila Camacho Av. from the vehicular node Basílica until the Roundabout La Normal, in the Municipality of Guadalajara (Plaza Patria, Circunvalación Country and Ávila Camacho stations).

Tunnel (underground section):

Comprises 5.3 kilometers (3.3 mi) in the Municipality of Guadalajara; from Fray Antonio Alcalde / 16 de Septiembre Av. (La Normal, Santuario and Guadalajara Centro stations), until Revolución Av. (Independencia and Plaza de la Bandera stations)

Viaduct 2 (elevated section):

Starts in the Municipality of Tlaquepaque; crossing by the De Las Torres (Central de Autobuses station) and Francisco Silva Romero (Lázaro Cárdenas and Tlaquepaque Centro stations) avenues until Revolución Av. (Río Nilo, Revolución, and CUCEI stations).

== Failed previous project ==
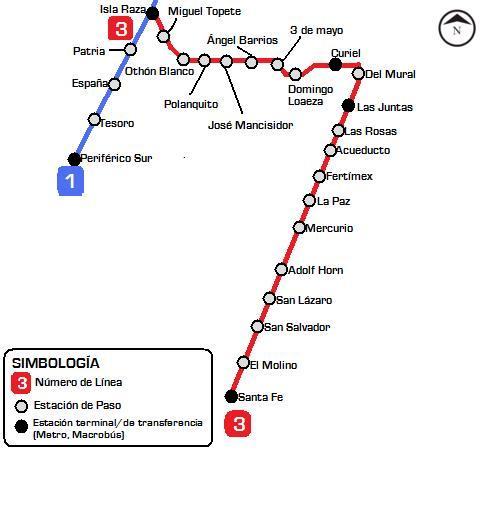
Line 3 map proposed by Alfaro and discarded by the local congress in 2009.

In 2009, the then mayor of Tlajomulco, Enrique Alfaro Ramírez, proposed a failed project for a Line 3 of the Guadalajara light rail to the Jalisco State Congress; however it was rejected by the partisan majority. The project would have entailed the construction of a completely overground line, which would have run toward the south of the Guadalajara metropolitan area; starting its route at the Isla Raza station of Line 1 of SITEUR running over the Miguel Topete street until it's crossing with and taking over the Patria Sur Avenue, from there it would turn east to take the Luis Covarrubias street until a small fork to retake the Patria Sur Avenue, at which point it would make a turn south taking the FF.CC. Guadalajara-Manzanillo tracks until the Hacienda Santa Fe colony, in the municipality of Tlajomulco.

This project was intended to benefit more than 700,000 people, as the zones where the line would be built suffer from a strong recession in public transport matters. Nonetheless, the Mexican Chamber of the Building Industry has resumed the discussion of the Guadalajara suburban train project, which, if completed, would benefit Tlajomulco through a massive railway transport system of users from and to the state capital; as well as the Line 4 project already contemplated by the SCT, which is expected to be built in the next administration and that will cross the Libertad and Reforma Guadalajara sectors.

== Damage in the Guadalajara historic centre ==
After the works for the underground section, La Tapatía passed below 342 houses; until February 2017 it had passed below 213, 6 of which are of relevant value. Only 2.8% of such properties do not show structural damage. The damage affected five houses and the Casa de los Perros, where only aesthetic cracks have been found which do not affect the structure itself. The TBM was already 60 metres ahead of the Metropolitan Cathedral, just below the Plaza de Armas, at which time it was pointed out that the 400 years old property passed the "litmus test" despite the report of new cracks. "There is no affectation to be worried about, everything is inside the expected margin" – said the head of SITEUR.
