= Lázaro (footballer, born 1977) =

Brazilian footballer (born 1977)

Personal information
- Full name: Lázaro Paulo de Souza
- Date of birth: 1977 (age 48–49)
- Place of birth: Simões Filho, Bahia, Brazil
- Position: Striker

Senior career*
Years	Team	Apps	(Gls)
2007–2009	Quân Khu 4		
2010–2011	Hải Phòng		
2012	Long An		
2013–2014	Trat		
- * Club domestic league appearances and goals

Lázaro Paulo de Souza (born 1977) is a Brazilian former footballer who played as a striker.

== Early life ==
Lazaro was born in 1977 in Simões Filho, Bahia state. He worked as a coffee picker as a child.

At the end of 2007, Lázaro went to Vietnam for triails in several teams. After being rejected by a few clubs, he was signed by Quân Khu 4. He helped the club win the Vietnamese First League in 2008 and gaining their promotion to V-League. In the 2009 V-League, Lázaro netted 15 goals, helping Quân Khu 4 avoid relegation by 2 points and won the top scorer award.
