= Lázaro Cárdenas metro station (Tlaquepaque) =

Metro station in Tlaquepaque, Jalisco, Mexico

Lázaro Cárdenas
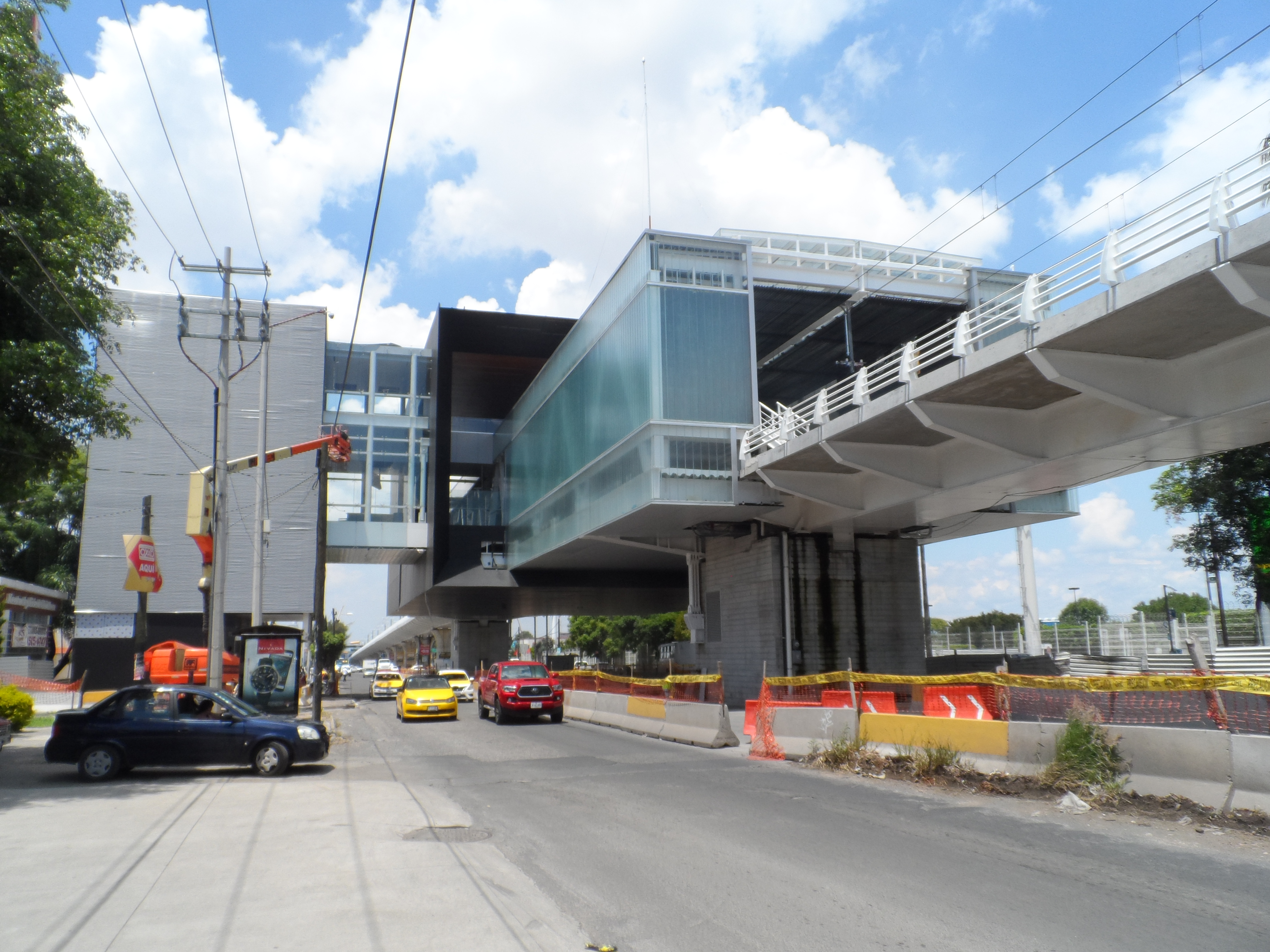
- The station's exterior in 2018

General information
- Location: Tlaquepaque, Jalisco; Mexico
- Coordinates: 20°37′56″N 103°17′46″W
- System: SITEUR light rail
- Line: 3

Construction
- Structure type: Elevated
- Cycle facilities: Yes
- Accessible: Yes

History
- Opened: 2020

Services
Preceding station	Sistema de Tren Eléctrico Urbano	Following station
Tlaquepaque Centro towards Arcos de Zapopan	Line 3	Central de Autobuses Terminus
Location

Lázaro Cárdenas is the second station of Line 3 of the Guadalajara Urban Electric Train System from south-east to north-west, and the seventeenth in opposite direction.

This station is located on the Francisco Silva Romero avenue of Tlaquepaque (Revolución avenue of Guadalajara), on its crossing with the República de Guatemala street, near the road junction where the Silva Romero avenue crosses the Calzada Lázaro Cárdenas del Río, from which the station takes its name. It's also one the elevated stations of the Guadalajara-Tlaquepaque viaduct of line 3.

The station logo is a stylised picture of the Revolución junction (lit. Nodo vial Revolución).

== Points of interest ==
- Tlaquepaque soccer stadium (by Niños Héroes street to the west)
- UPN Guadalajara Campus (by República de Guatemala street)
- Tlaquepaque shopping centre (by Niños Héroes street to the east)
- San José Castísimo Patriarca church
