= Lázaro Martínez =

Lázaro Martínez may refer to:

- Lázaro Martínez (sprinter) (born 1962), Cuban sprinter
- Lázaro Martínez (triple jumper) (born 1997), Cuban triple jumper
- Lázaro Arias Martínez (born 1957), Mexican PRI politician
