= Central de Autobuses metro station =

Light rail station in Tlaquepaque, Jalisco, Mexico

Central de Autobuses
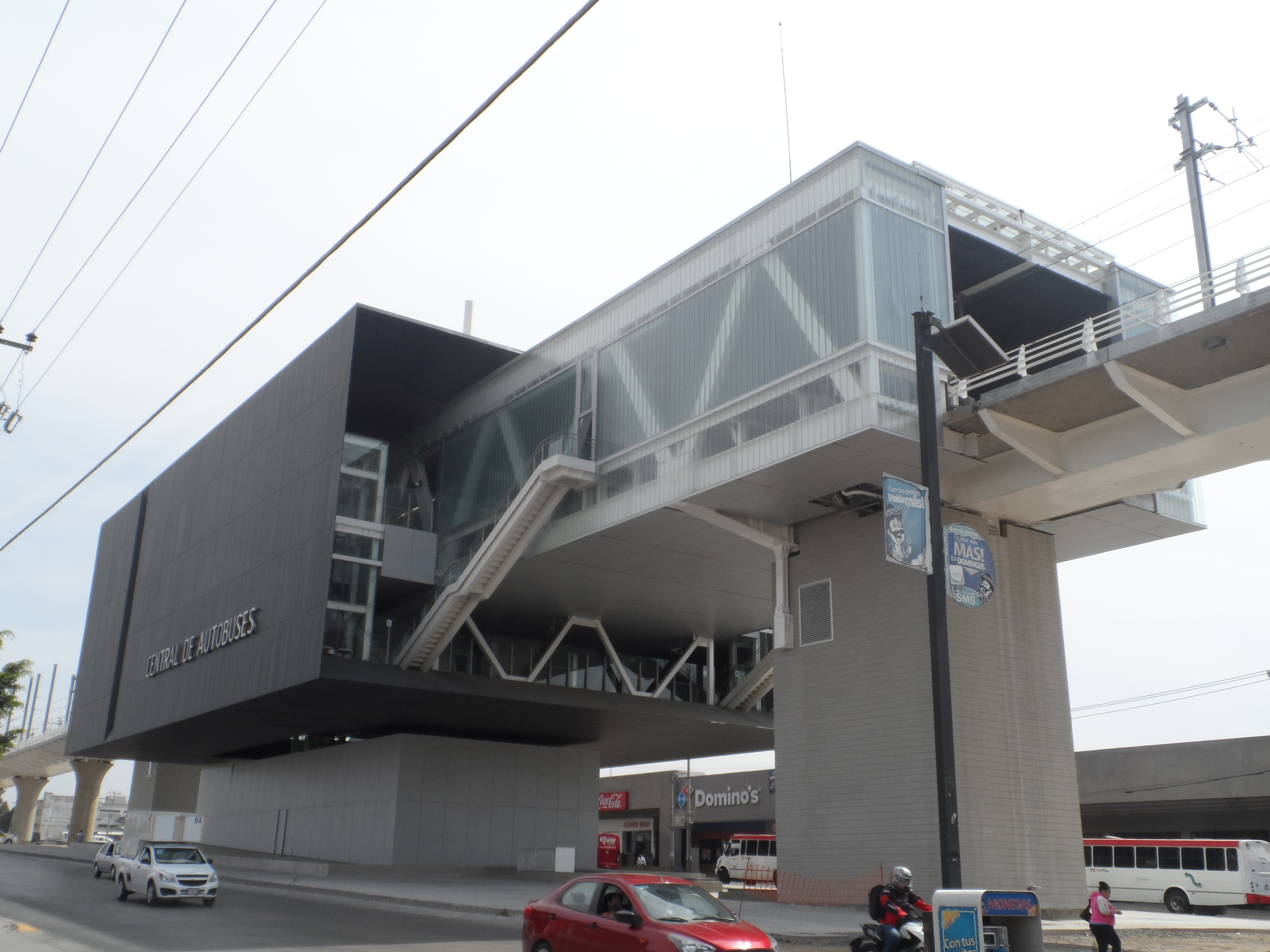
- The station's exterior in 2018

General information
- Location: Tlaquepaque; Jalisco, Mexico
- Coordinates: 20°37′23″N 103°17′06″W
- System: SITEUR light rail
- Line: 3

Construction
- Structure type: Elevated
- Cycle facilities: Yes
- Accessible: Yes

History
- Opened: 2020

Services
Preceding station	Sistema de Tren Eléctrico Urbano	Following station
Lázaro Cárdenas towards Arcos de Zapopan	Line 3	Terminus
Location

The Central de Autobuses railway station is the first station of Line 3 of the Sistema de Tren Eléctrico Urbano of Guadalajara from south-east to north-west, and eighteenth in the opposite direction.
