= Sistema Integral del Tren Ligero =

Sistema Integral del Tren Ligero (SITREN)
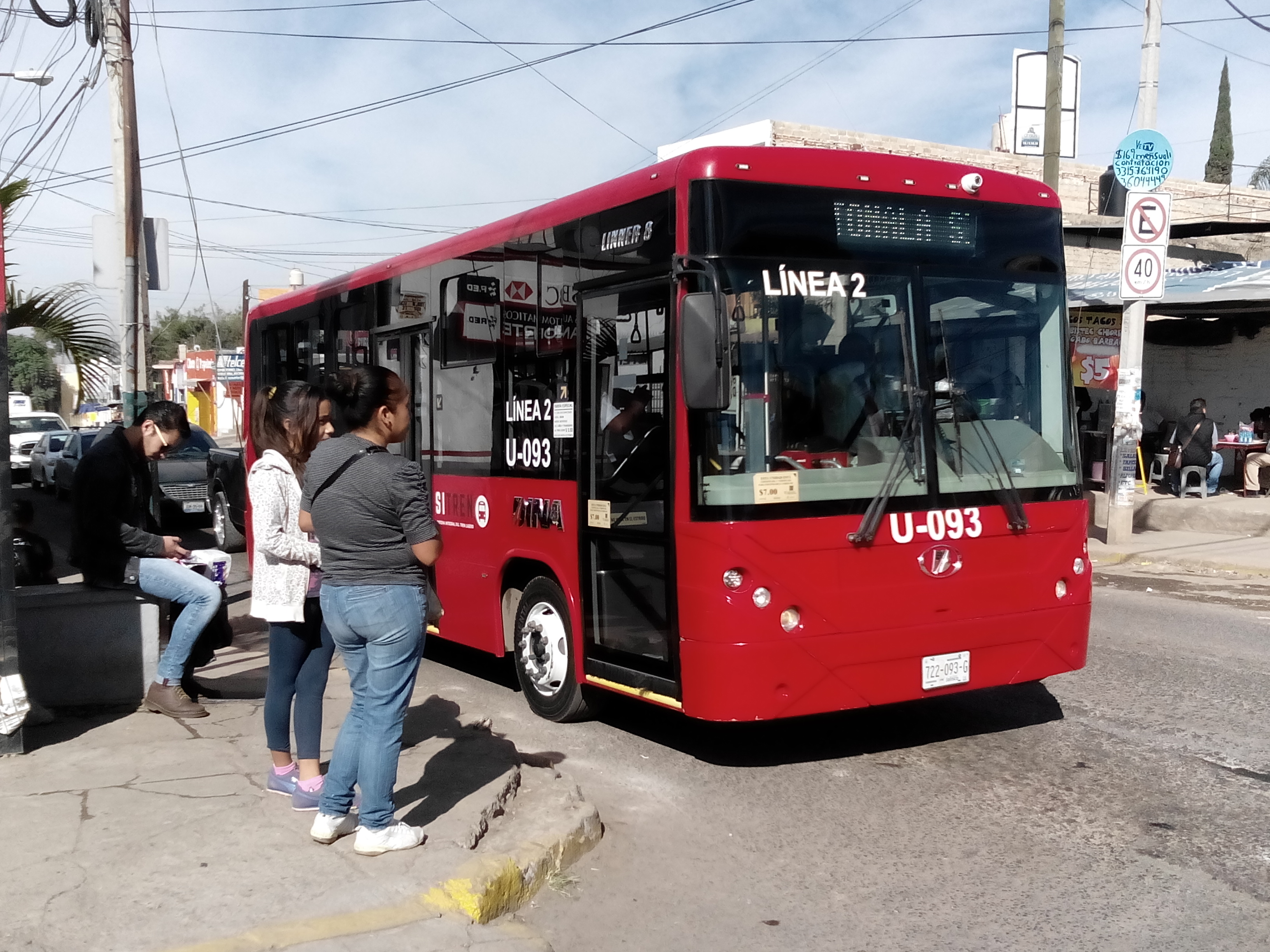
- Line 2 bus in Tonalá

Overview
- Owner: SITEUR
- Area served: Guadalajara, Zapopan, Tonalá
- Locale: Guadalajara
- Transit type: Feeder bus
- Number of lines: 4
- Number of stations: 47 (+ 8 in alternative route on Sundays)
- Daily ridership: 25 000 (approximately)
- Website: http://www.siteur.gob.mx

Operation
- Began operation: January 5, 2007; 19 years ago
- Operator: Sistema de Tren Eléctrico Urbano
- Number of vehicles: 111 units (in all lines)

Technical
- System length: 68.5 kilometres (42.6 mi)
- Average speed: 50 km/h (31.07 mph)
System map

The Sistema Integral de Tren Ligero (SITREN) (Spanish for Light Rail Integral System) (formerly PreTren) is the semi-articulated bus service which feeds the Sistema de Tren Eléctrico Urbano in Jalisco, Mexico. It started operations on January 5, 2007. It serves the municipalities of Guadalajara, Zapopan and Tonalá.

== History ==
=== Sistema Auxiliar de Enlace ===
The history of train feeder buses in Guadalajara began with a project called the Auxiliary Link System (Spanish: Sistema Auxiliar de Enlace) (SAE). On 1 February 1995, SITEUR introduced a project which aimed to increase user reach. Based on the experiences of other transport systems in the world, it was contemplated to integrate feeder routes that would be shared between the existing lines 1 and 2. The routes would be strategically traced based on studies about the areas with the highest influx of passengers.

Eight routes were proposed. These were: Dermatológico - Los Belenes (Telmex Auditorium), Tesoro - Las Águilas (López Mateos Sur), 18 de Marzo - Industrial Zone, Oblatos - CUCEI, San Andrés - Circunvalación Oblatos, San Jacinto - Pila Seca (Tlaquepaque), La Aurora - Beatriz Hernández and Tetlán - Guadalajara Bus Station.

On 29 January 1996, the system began operations with 7 out of the 8 proposed routes —the 18 de Marzo - Industrial Zone route was postponed due to technical issues—. The transfer from the train to the buses and vice versa was free of charge. The average speed was 18 km/h (11 mph), and the headway approximately 10 minutes. The routes were covered by 22 buses + 5 reserves. The service was operated in a coordinated manner between SITEUR and the state-owned Servicios y Transportes (SyT).

The service was temporarily shutdown on 28 November 1998, arguing a lack of drivers and buses, as well as low demand. However, the service was never re-established .

=== Pre-Tren ===
On 5 January 2007, the operations of a service known back then as PreTren began. It connected the city centre with the western zone of Zapopan. The route starts at the Juárez station of Line 2 and ends at the Zapopan west bus station.

Line 1 route starts at Av. Juárez and Calzada del Federalismo, passing along Av. Vallarta until the Periférico Beltway. From there it returns by Av. Vallarta until the Glorieta Minerva, where it takes Av. López Mateos Norte and Av. Hidalgo until Calzada del Federalismo, where it started.

It has a special service on Sundays, since the Vía RecreActiva (a biking route) blocks a section of the route, so the bus takes an alternative route.

=== SiTren ===
On 29 January 2015, the Jalisco state governor, Aristóteles Sandoval, announced an expansion of the then called PreTren, although now under the name of SITREN, an acronym for Sistema Integral del Tren Ligero (Spanish for Light Rail Integral System).

Line 2 of SITREN began operations on Tuesday 3 February 2015. This line was planned to run to the municipality of Tonalá, serving the neighbourhoods of Zalatitán, Basilio Vadillo, Bosques de Tonalá and Educadores. Its route begins at the Tetlán station of line 2 of SITEUR, and runs by the avenues María Reyes, Juárez (Zalatitán), Gigantes, Ruperto García del Alba, Juan Gil Preciado (Tonalá), Encino, Juan de Dios Robledo, De los Maestros, Tonaltecas and ends at the Emiliano Zapata street until the Glorieta to the Tonalteca Crafts. It returns through Zaragoza street and then back to Tetlán. This line was of great importance since Tonalá suffers from a serious lag in terms of public transport and the quality of its streets and avenues is extremely poor.

Line 3 of SITREN started operations on 2 February 2016, replacing the trolleybus route 400, now under SITEUR authority. It follows the same 34 km route that the original route had, from the Felipe Ángeles street until the vicinity of the Glorieta Minerva. It has 54 stops.

It must be mentioned that for this line only modern trolleybuses were acquired. They have the capacity to disconnect from the catenary in case of breakdowns or incidents on the roads. Twenty five units were purchased, of which five had card recharge machines.

On 26 November 2018, the system was expanded with the creation of Line 4, starting in Zapopan and ending in Valle de los Molinos. This line arose with the idea of feeding line 3 of SITEUR, then still under construction.

On 15 October an agreement was signed with the University of Guadalajara, creating an extension of line 1, named Line 1-B. This extension arose due to the need for transportation of the students of the University Center of Biological and Agricultural Sciences (CUCBA). The route aims to solve a 40-year-problem, since public transport to and from the university centre had always been poor. In addition, this route benefited the workers of El Bajío, an area through which this line runs.

== Service ==
=== Fleet ===
A total of twenty seven units serve Line 1, of which 3 have disabled access, across 27 stations (plus eight that are used on Sunday route, since a section of the normal route is blocked during that day), It runs from 5:00 to 23:00 hours. Line 1-B is served by 7 units (2 with disabled access), while Line 2 is served by 22 units (3 with disabled access). Line 3 counts with 25 trolleybuses, all with disabled access. Line 4 has 33 units serving the route (6 of which have disabled access).

=== Payment system ===
The toll payment system is through a smart card that can be acquired at the Light Rail facilities as well as in various shops and services located along the Vallarta corridor. Payment with cash is also possible, depositing the exact amount in a slot machine that the buses have at the entrance; the machine does not return exchange. The authorized fare is $ 9.50 Mexican pesos, and, by using the smart card as a payment method, users can transfer to the SITEUR network and vice versa paying only half of the official fare (Mex$4.75), saving considerably, especially those who regularly use the car or the conventional public transport.

== Characteristics ==
=== Monitoring system ===
The system implements state-of-the-art technology that allows detailed monitoring of the quality of the service provided to its users. This is achieved by logging bus operation telemetry, especially driving telemetry, such as acceleration, braking, travel time, punctual departures and arrivals at the terminals.

=== Support for ecology ===
The SITREN service helps reduce pollutants that are dumped into the environment, guaranteeing the efficient use of fuel since all buses comply with the EPA 98 ecological standard, apart from the fact that their transmission is automatic and not manual. In addition, due to its system of predefined stops, the bus makes fewer starts, generating less pollution.

=== Disabled Access Units ===
The norm to equip more than 10% of the buses with special platforms for users with reduced mobility is also complied with; two to four buses are equipped with said platforms on each line.

== Operation ==
According to INEGI data, the first two SITREN routes operate with 38 units during the week and 25 on Saturdays and Sundays. In 2017, the units travelled 2,096,255 kilometres (1,302,552 mi), that is, an average of 175,000 kilometres (109,000 miles) per month. That same year, the units transported 4,901,737 passengers (of which 34,608 paid with a discount), 408,478 per month on average.

Year	Kilometers traveled	Passengers
2013	910,743	1,924,589
2014	679,059	1,512,176
2015	1,837,232	3,498,342
2016	2,232,396	4,960,609
2017	2,096,255	4,901,737

Line 3 is not included because INEGI counts it separately, since it considers the line a type of electric transport, like the urban rail.

== Lines ==
SITREN Lines
Line	Color	Trip	Start date	Length	Number of stops	Branches	Number of stops in branch
Line 1	Green	Juárez - Aviación	January 5, 2007	26.5 km (16.5 mi)	51	1	8
Line 1-B		Aviación - CUCBA	October 11, 2018	28 km (17 mi)	30	1	
Line 2	Red	Tetlán - Tonalá	February 3, 2015	18 km (11 mi)	44	0	0
Line 3 (formerly route 400)	Light blue	Los Arcos - Felipe Angeles	January 31, 2016	18 km (11 mi)	55	1	7
Line 4		Zapopan - Valle de los Molinos	November 23, 2018	38 km (24 mi)	72	1	17

=== Line 1 ===
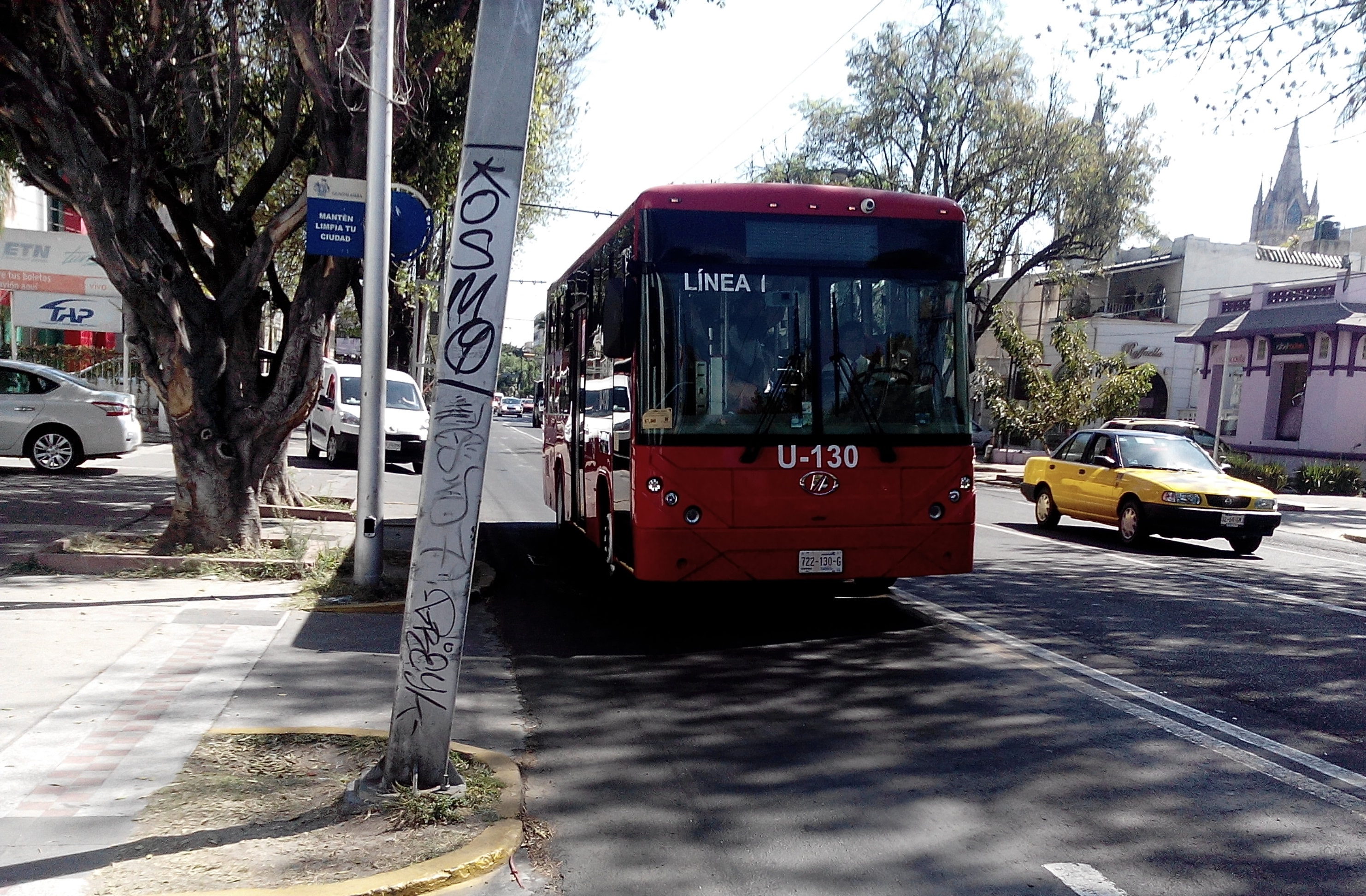
Line 1 bus over Av. Vallarta

Line 1 Aviación stops

- Juárez
- Argentina
- Consulado
- Chapultepec
- Unión
- Club de Industriales
- Centro Magno
- Los Arcos
- Juan Palomar y Arias
- Gran Plaza
- Cámara de Comercio
- Patria Poniente
- Plaza Galerías
- Sta. Maria del Pueblito
- Jocotan
- Ciudad Granja
- Los Pirules
- Funeral Colonias
- Concentro
- Periférico Poniente
- Aviación

Line 1 Juárez stops

- Aviación
- Periférico Poniente
- Carretera Nogales
- Aviación
- Carretera Nogales
- Concentro
- Funeral Colonias
- Los Pirules
- Ciudad Granja
- Jocotan
- Sta. Maria del Pueblito
- Plaza Galerías
- Velazquez
- Patria Poniente
- Los Cubos
- Camara de Comercio
- Gran Plaza
- Exi-Moda
- Juan Palomar y Arias
- La Minerva
- Adolfo López Mateos
- Victoriano Salado Álvarez
- Club de Industriales
- Americas
- Chapultepec
- General Coronado
- Gregorio Davila
- Federalismo
- Juárez

Line 1 alternate route (Via Recreativa) stops

- Federalismo
- U. de G.
- General Coronado
- Chapultepec
- Américas
- Club de Industriales
- V. Salado Álvarez
- La Minerva

=== Line 1-B ===
Line 1-B CUCBA stops

- Aviación
- Bimbo
- Daosa
- La Moderna
- Bosques Vallarta
- Technology Park 1
- Technology Park 2
- Gasolinera Technology Park
- Entronque CUCBA
- Jilgueros
- CUCBA

Line 1-B Aviación stops

- CUCBA
- Jilgueros
- Ramón Padilla
- Puente Pinar de la Venta
- Crucero Nextipac
- Venta del Astillero
- Ejido
- La Primavera
- Belenes
- Manuel García
- Allende
- Pinar de la Venta 1
- Pinar de la Venta 2
- Diana
- Parque de los Contenedores
- West Plaza Park
- Technology Park
- Rancho Contento
- Progreso
- Jiménez Autocamiones
- Aviación

=== Line 2 ===
Line 2 Tonalá stops

- Tetlán
- Solidaridad
- González Ortega
- La Pila
- Zalatitán
- Motolinía
- Loma del Norte
- Chapuchina
- Campos Vida
- Misión San Francisco
- Antonio Caso
- Basilio Vadillo
- Loma Bonita
- Ciprés
- Industria
- Insurgentes
- Cruz Bernabé
- Educadores
- Loma Ahuisculco
- El Zapote
- Policía
- Tonalá
- Alfarería

Line 2 Tetlán stops

- Alfarería
- Tonalá
- Policía
- El Zapote
- Loma Ahuisculco
- Educadores
- Cruz Bernabé
- Insurgentes
- Industria
- Ciprés
- Loma Bonita
- Basilio Vadillo
- Antonio Caso
- Misión San Francisco
- Campos Vida
- Loma del Norte
- Motolinía
- Zalatitán
- La Pila
- González Ortega
- Solidaridad
- Tetlán

=== Line 3 (Trolleybus) ===
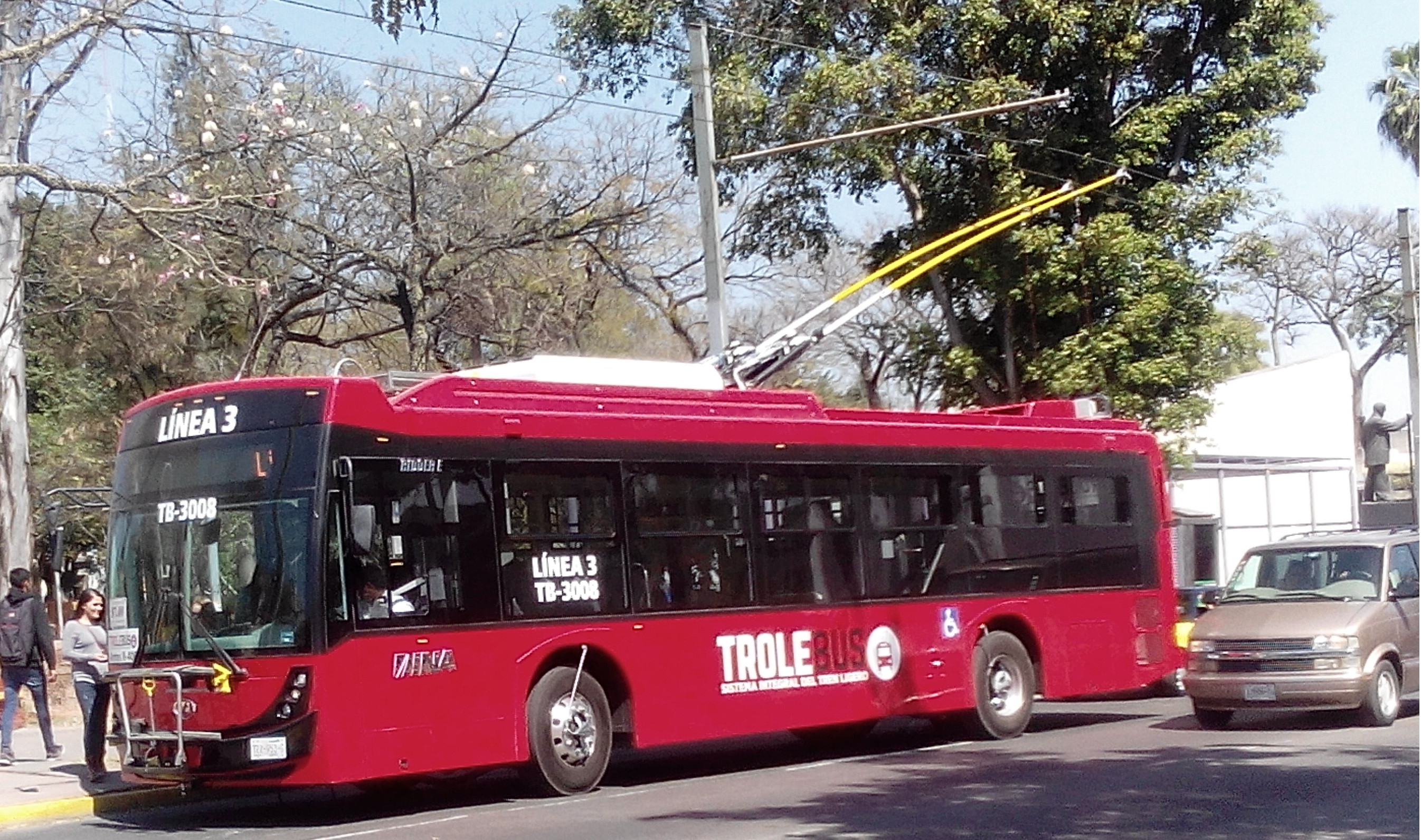
A line 3 trolleybus.

Line 3 Felipe Ángeles stops

- Arcos
- Morelos
- Salado Álvarez
- Francisco Rojas
- Aurelio L. Gallardo
- Américas
- Escuela Militar
- Chapultepec
- General Coronado
- Gregorio Dávila
- Juan N. Cumplido
- Federalismo
- Jesús María
- La Merced
- Degollado
- Independencia
- Cabañas
- Mariano Jiménez
- Ugarte Loyola
- Aquiles Serdán
- Mercado del Mar
- Pedro C. Negrete
- José María Gómez
- Rita Pérez de Moreno
- San Juan Bosco
- Rivas Guillén
- Francisco Villa
- Felipe Ángeles

Line 3 Arcos stops

- Felipe Ángeles
- Industria
- Francisco Villa
- Damián Carmona
- San Juan Bosco
- Rita Pérez de Moreno
- Ramón Blancarte
- Porfirio Díaz
- Román Morales
- Aquiles Serdán
- San Martín
- Juan Díaz Covarrubias
- Cabañas
- Independencia
- Poder Judicial
- Rotonda
- Mercado Corona
- Capuchinas
- Templo del Carmen
- Juárez
- Paraninfo
- Argentina
- Consulado
- Chapultepec
- Américas
- Club de Industriales
- Centro Magno
- Arcos

=== Line 4 ===
Line 4 Valle de los Molinos stops

- Basílica
- Morelos
- Industria
- Prol. Laureles
- Mercado del Mar
- El Vigía
- Del Pial
- La Carreta
- Terraza Belenes
- Anillo Periférico
- Arco del Triunfo
- Arco de la Estrella
- La Cima
- Dr. Ángel Leaño
- Santa Mónica
- Del Tigre
- Eco Park
- El Zapote
- Guadalajara
- Atotonilco
- Base Aérea
- Alamitos
- Miguel Alemán
- Valle Imperial
- La Cardona
- Granados
- Las Magnolias
- Calandrias
- Crucero Colotlán
- Puerta del Llano
- Camino Copalita
- Amaranto
- Amaranto 1
- Capistrano
- Los Molinos
- 25 de Mayo
- Ejido Copalita
- Albaterra
- Valle de los Molinos
- Valentín Vidrio
- Valle de Zapopan
- Valle de la Luna
- Valle de Ameca
- Valle de Atemajac
- Valle de Zapotlán
- Valle de Miranda

Line 4 Zapopan stops

- Valle de Miranda
- Valle de Zapotlán
- Valle de Atemajac
- Valle de Ameca
- Valle de la Luna
- Valle de Zapopan
- Valle de Copala
- Valle de los Molinos
- Albaterra
- Hacienda Santa Cruz
- 25 de Mayo
- Los Molinos
- Palermo
- Alhambra
- Camino Copalita
- Puerta del Llano
- Crucero Colotlán
- Calandrias
- Las Magnolias
- Granados
- La Cardona
- Valle Imperial
- Tercera Oriente
- Quinta Oriente
- Base Área
- Guadalajara
- Eco Park
- Av. Federalistas
- Los Robles
- Santa Mónica
- Dr. Ángel Leaño
- Arco de la Estrella
- Arco del Triunfo
- Anillo Periférico
- Plata
- Emilio Carranza
- Anahuác
- López Cotilla
- Panteón Municipal Zapopan
- Sarcófago
- Juan Manuel
- Benito Juárez
- Basílica

== See also ==
- Sistema de Tren Eléctrico Urbano
- Guadalajara trolleybus
- Mi Macro
