= Refugio light rail station =

Refugio
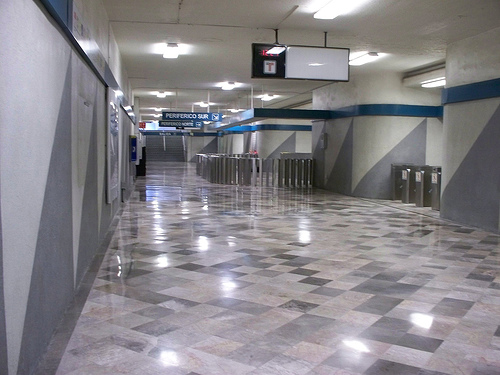
- Interior of the station

General information
- Location: Guadalajara; Jalisco, Mexico
- Coordinates: 20°40′56″N 103°21′15″W
- System: SITEUR light rail
- Line: 1

Construction
- Structure type: Underground
- Cycle facilities: Yes
- Accessible: Yes

History
- Opened: 1976; 50 years ago (trolleybus); 1989; 37 years ago (light rail)

Services
Preceding station	Sistema de Tren Eléctrico Urbano	Following station
Mezquitán towards Auditorio	Line 1	Juárez towards Periférico Sur
Location

Refugio is a station on line 1 of the Sistema de Tren Eléctrico Urbano in the Guadalajara Metropolitan Area, Mexico. The station is located in the city centre, just north of the Parish Church of Our Lady of Refuge (La Parroquia de Nuestra Señora del Refugio) on Del Federalismo between Joaquín Angulo and Herrera y Cairo streets.
