= Mexicaltzingo light rail station =

Light rail station in Guadalajara, Jalisco, Mexico

Mexicaltzingo
- The station's platforms in 2022

General information
- Location: Guadalajara; Jalisco, Mexico
- Coordinates: 20°40′00″N 103°21′18″W
- System: SITEUR light rail
- Line: 1

Construction
- Structure type: Underground
- Cycle facilities: Yes
- Accessible: Yes

History
- Opened: 1989; 37 years ago

Services
Preceding station	Sistema de Tren Eléctrico Urbano	Following station
Juárez towards Auditorio	Line 1	Washington towards Periférico Sur
Location

The Mexicaltzingo railway station is part of the Sistema de Tren Eléctrico Urbano in the Mexican state of Jalisco.
