= Sistema de Tren Eléctrico Urbano =

Urban rail system in Guadalajara, Jalisco, Mexico

Coordinates: 20°43′49″N 103°21′08″W

Urban Electric Train System
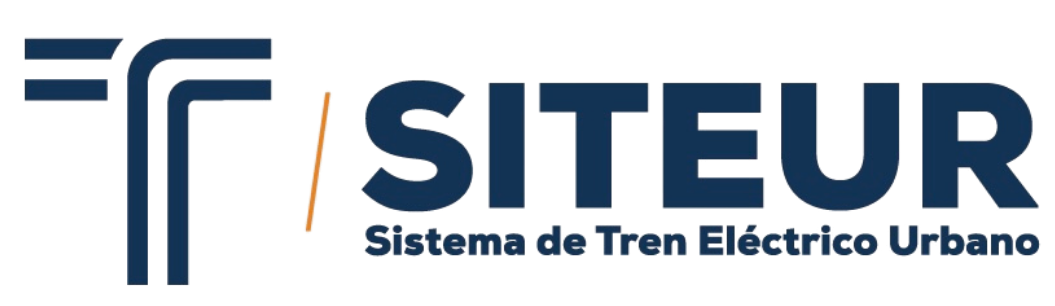

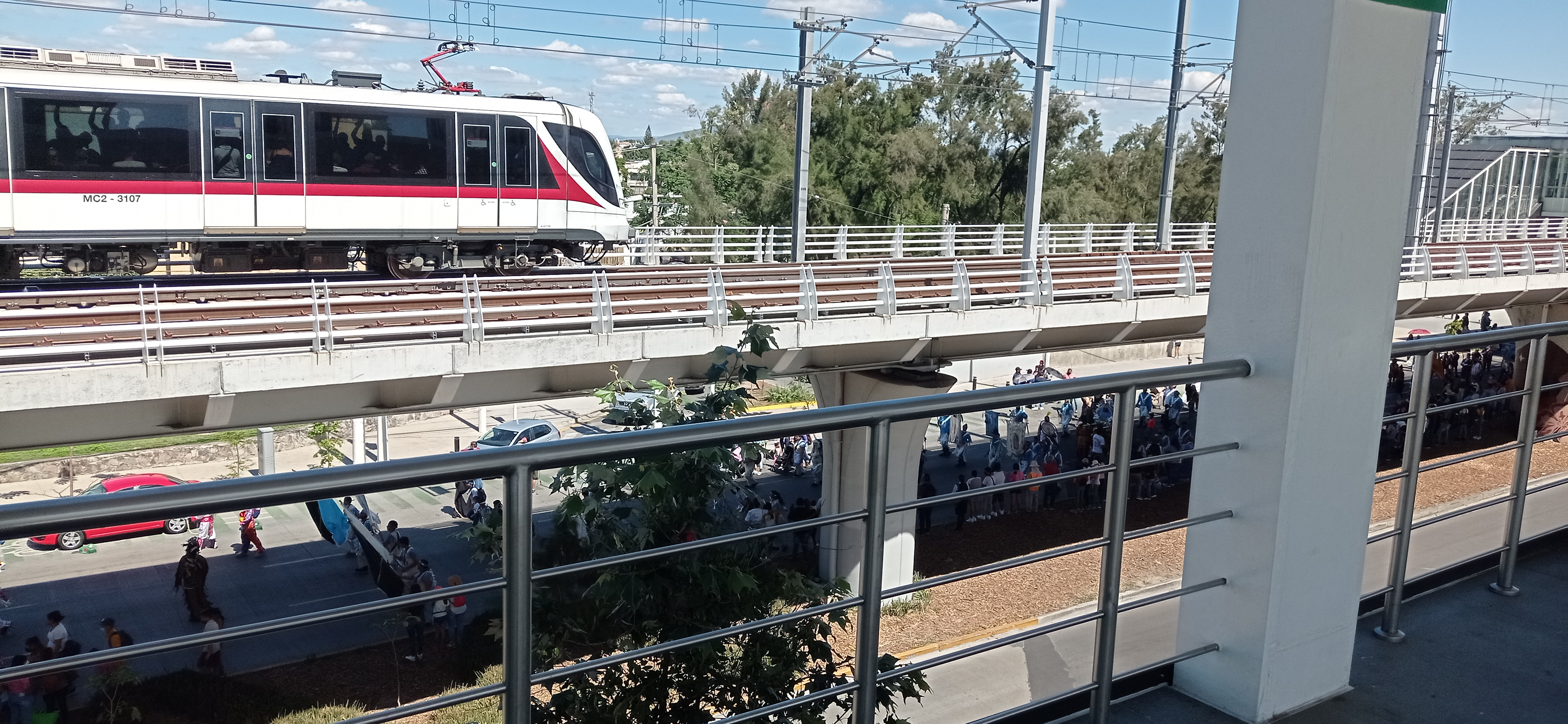
- Line 3 of the SITEUR network

Overview
- Native name: Sistema de Tren Eléctrico Urbano
- Locale: Guadalajara, Jalisco
- Transit type: Light rail (Lines 1, 2 & 4); Rapid transit; (Line 3)
- Number of lines: 7
- Number of stations: 140
- Daily ridership: 450,601
- Website: SITEUR

Operation
- Began operation: Light Rail: 1989; 37 years ago (Line 1 & 2); Rapid Transit: 2020; 6 years ago (Line 3); Light Rail: 2025; 1 year ago (Line 4); Bus Rapid Transit 2009; 17 years ago (Line 5, 6 & 7)
- Operators: SITEUR, an agency of Jalisco state

Technical
- System length: 68.8 km (42.8 mi)
- Track gauge: 1,435 mm (4 ft 8 1/2 in) standard gauge
- Electrification: Overhead line; 750 V DC (Lines 1 and 2); 1,500 V DC (Line 3)

The Sistema de Tren Eléctrico Urbano or SITEUR (lit. 'Urban Electric Train System') is an urban rail transit system serving the Guadalajara metropolitan area, in the municipalities of Guadalajara, Zapopan, Tlaquepaque, and Tlajomulco de Zuñiga in the state of Jalisco, Mexico. It is owned and operated by the state of Jalisco.

Opened in 1989, the system consists of four light rail and three bus rapid transit lines: Line 1, running north to south with 20 stations; Line 2, running east to west with 10 stations; Line 3, running north-west to south-east with 18 stations; and Line 4, running north to south with 8 stations; Line 5 , running south-west to south-east with 8 stations; Line 6, running north-east to south with 27 stations; Line 7, running north-east to south-east along the beltway of the city with 48 stations; It has the most widely used light rail system in North America, with an annual ridership of 168,605,000 passengers in 2024.

== History ==
The history of urban trains in Guadalajara dates back to the 19th century, with the first trams pulled by mules, serving a route between the Guadalajara Cathedral and the Templo de la Merced.

In 1974, several houses and streets in the city centre were demolished to make way for a new wide roadway, named Avenida Federalismo; the construction project included a new public-transport tunnel beneath the roadway. Avenida Federalismo (also known as Calzada del Federalismo) replaced what had been C. Moro (but with a much wider right-of-way) and is one of Guadalajara's major thoroughfares. The 6.6-kilometre (4.1 mi) tunnel underneath the avenue was designed for future use by a rail system, but due to a lack of funding at the time, it was served initially by a new trolleybus system, which opened on December 15, 1976. Several years later, work began to convert the trolleybus tunnel and stations for use by a light rail line. The tunnel closed for trolleybuses in early 1988, and the first light rail line, Line 1, opened on September 1, 1989. Trolleybus service remained in operation on other routes.

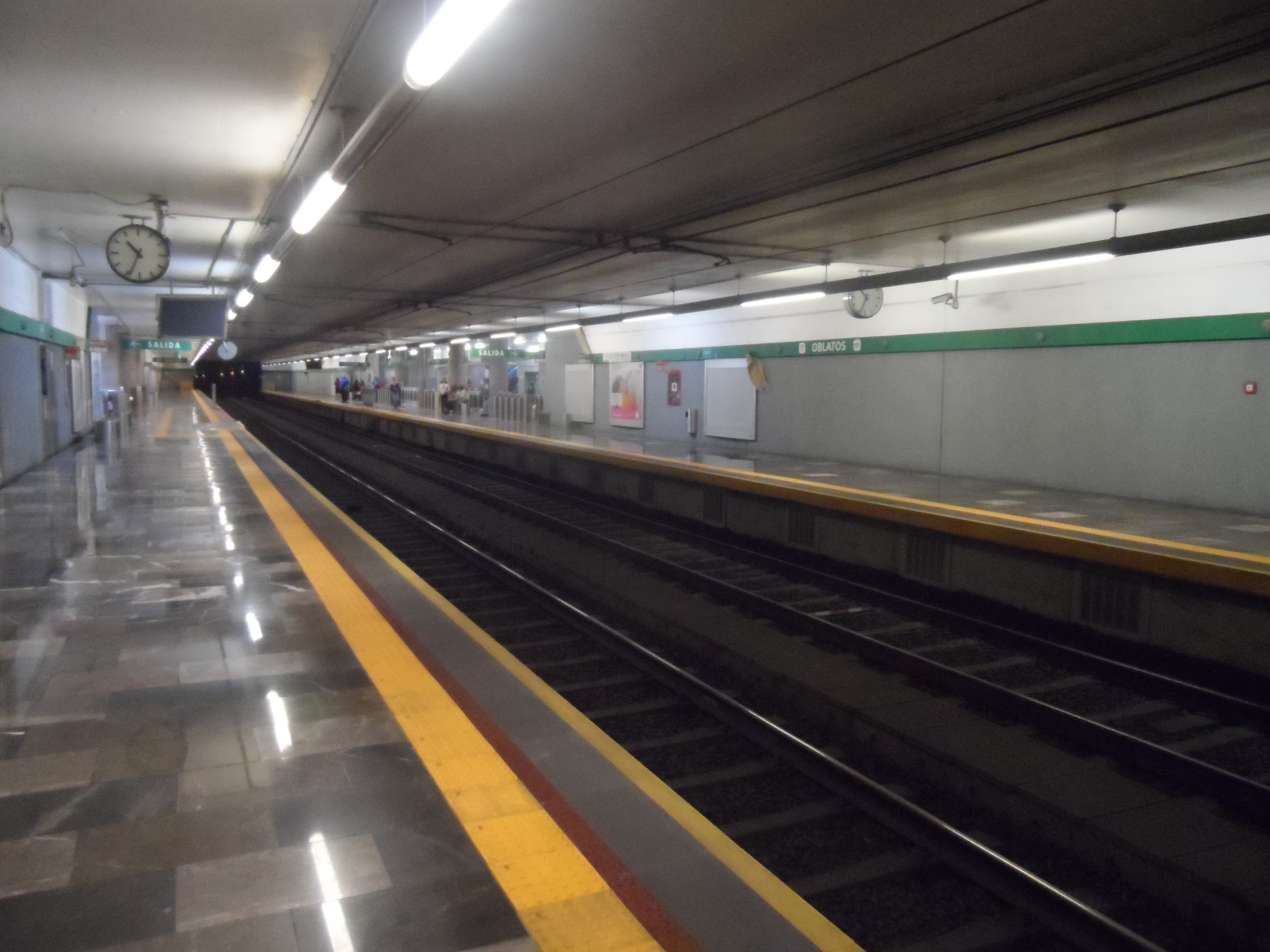
Line 2 runs entirely underground. Oblatos station, 2019

A few years later, Line 2 was constructed, generally running east from the city center; it opened on July 1, 1994. Because of the continuing heavy traffic congestion on the city's streets and the large numbers of users of the rail system, there are plans to extend Line 2 to the west.

Line 1 runs underground in the city center, but runs "at grade" north and south of the city center, and its surface sections include several level crossings, protected by crossing gates. The station platforms accommodate trains composed of up to 3 cars. Line 2 is entirely underground except for a non-passenger section at its east end, connecting the last station to the maintenance facility. Its stations are long enough to accommodate trains of up to four cars.

Siemens supplied the system engineering, signaling and telecommunication, power supply, and some components of the vehicles.

Construction of Line 3 began at the end of 2014. The 21.45-kilometre (13.33 mi) line includes a 5.35 km-long (3.32 mi) underground tunnel, flanked by two elevated segments: 8.65 km (5.37 mi) in the northwest Zapopan section and 7.45 km (4.63 mi) in the southeast Tlaquepaque section; the entire line serves 18 stations, 5 of which are in a tunnel. It crosses the full length of the city running northwest to southeast, from Zapopan in the northwest to Tlaquepaque and Tonalá, in the southeast, through the city center. In addition to the rolling stock, Alstom provided the communication, signalling, and traffic control systems for Line 3, which began operation on September 12, 2020.

In 2018, SITEUR added the Auditorio station to Line 1, which became the new northern terminus, and began lengthening Line 1 station platforms from 60 to 90 m (200 to 300 ft) to accommodate three-car train consists. Partial operation began with three-car trains in March 2019, and the platform extension project is expected to be complete by May 2019; other upgrades to train signaling and control are expected to be complete by July 2020. The TEG-90 fleet was updated with new motors and power converters.

Construction of Line 4 began on May 22, 2022. The line was inaugurated on December 15, 2025. It runs 21.2 km (13.2 mi) south from Guadalajara/Tlaquepaque (the northern terminus is at the existing Fray Angélico station, which is the southern terminus of the Mi Macro Calzada BRT service) to Tlajomulco along an existing railroad right-of-way.

A bus rapid transit (BRT) line called Line 5 (Macro Aeropuerto) was opened on June 4, 2026, and the other existing BRT lines of Guadalajara, Mi Macro Calzada and Mi Macro Periferico, were later added to the system as lines 6 and 7.

== Lines ==
Line	Termini		Length	Stations	Year opened
Line 1 of the Guadalajara urban rail system	Auditorio	Periférico Sur	16.5 km (10.3 mi)	20	1989
Line 2 of the Guadalajara urban rail system	Juárez	Tetlán	8.7 km (5.4 mi)	10	1994
Line 3 of the Guadalajara urban rail system	Central de Autobuses	Arcos de Zapopan	21.5 km (13.4 mi)	18	2020
Line 4 of the Guadalajara urban rail system	Las Juntas	Tlajomulco Centro	21.2 km (13.2 mi)	8	2025

=== Line 1 ===
Line 1 runs from north (North Beltway) to south (South Beltway). It is 16.5 kilometres (10.3 mi) long. Line 1 stations are:

- Auditorio
- Periférico Norte (Connection with Mi Macro Periférico)
- Dermatológico
- Atemajac
- División del Norte
- Ávila Camacho (Connection with Line 3)
- Mezquitán
- Refugio
- Juárez (Connection with Line 2)
- Mexicaltzingo
- Washington
- Santa Filomena
- Unidad Deportiva
- Urdaneta
- 18 de Marzo
- Isla Raza
- Patria
- España
- Santuario Mártires de Cristo Rey
- Periférico Sur (Connection with Mi Macro Periférico)

=== Line 2 ===
Line 2 runs from downtown (Juárez) to the east (Tetlán), and is 8.7 kilometres (5.4 mi) long. Its stations are:

- Juárez (Connection with Line 1)
- Plaza Universidad (Connection with Line 3)
- San Juan de Dios (Connection with Mi Macro Calzada)
- Belisario Domínguez
- Oblatos
- Cristóbal de Oñate
- San Andrés
- San Jacinto
- La Aurora
- Tetlán

=== Line 3 ===
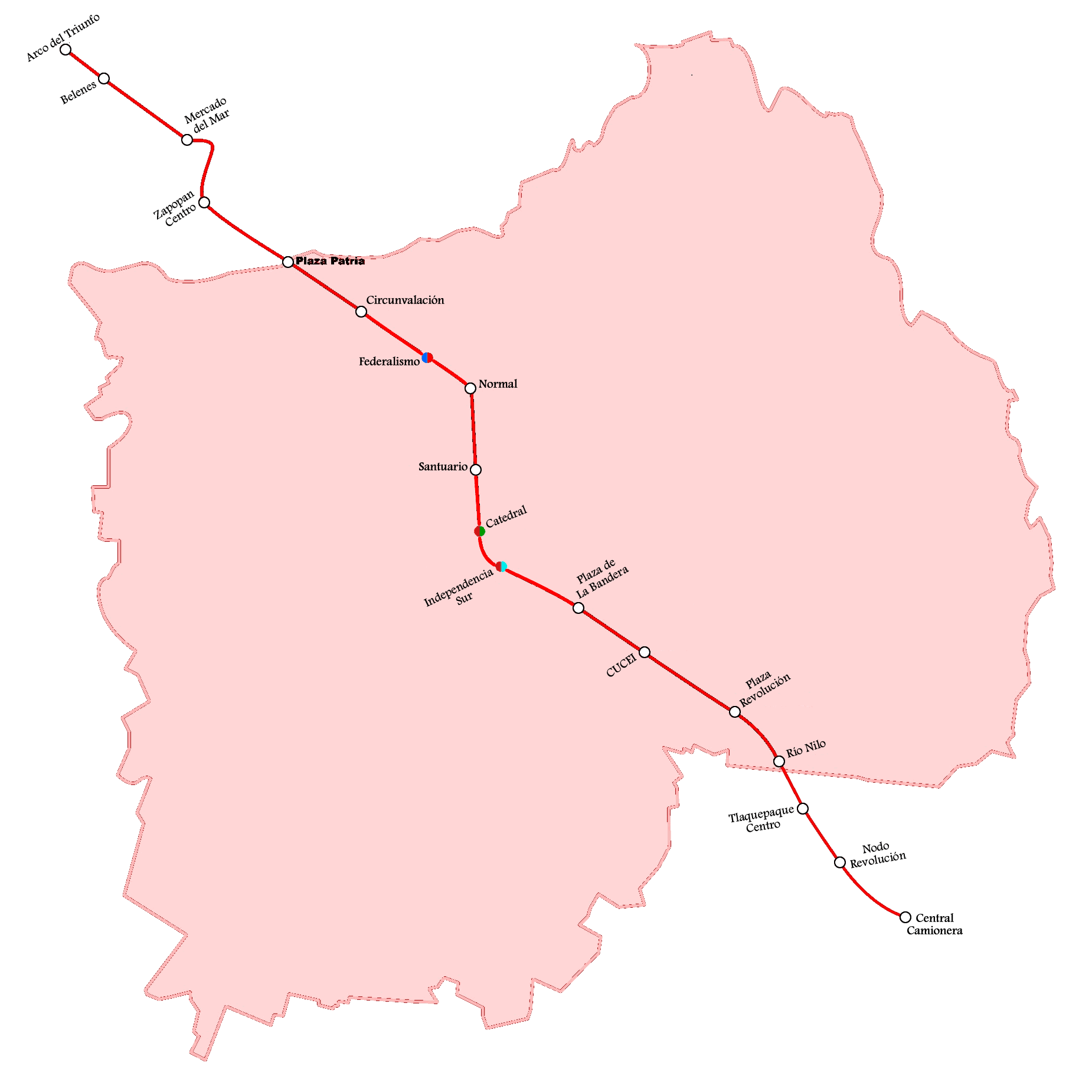
SITEUR Line 3 Route (2017)

Line 3 runs from Zapopan in the northwest to Tlaquepaque and Tonalá in the southeast. It's 21.5 km (13.4 mi) long, and its stations are:

- Arcos de Zapopan
- Periférico Belenes (Connection with Mi Macro Periférico)
- Mercado del Mar
- Zapopan Centro
- Plaza Patria
- Circunvalación Country
- Ávila Camacho (Connection with Line 1)
- La Normal
- Santuario
- Guadalajara Centro (Connection with Line 2)
- Independencia (Connection with Mi Macro Calzada)
- Plaza de la Bandera
- CUCEI
- Revolución
- Río Nilo
- Tlaquepaque Centro
- Lázaro Cárdenas
- Central de Autobuses

=== Line 4 ===
Line 4 runs from Guadalajara to the municipality of Tlajomulco. It is 21.2 km (13.2 mi) long, and its stations are:

- Las Juntas
- Periférico Sur
- Adolf Horn
- Concepción del Valle
- San Sebastián
- La Fortuna
- Centro Universitario
- Tlajomulco Centro

== Fleet ==
The fleet consists of 78 articulated light rail vehicles, each bi-directional ("double-ended") and powered from overhead lines. They have a top speed of 70 km/h (43 mph). Three of the models are the same general type – only the Barcelona Metro 9000 Series units, which operate on the Line 3, are different – three models were built in Mexico, and one model was built in Spain.

The first 16 TLG-88 (Tren Ligero de Guadalajara, 1988) cars were built by Concarril in Ciudad Sahagún, using propulsion equipment from Melmex (Mitsubishi Electric of Mexico). Another 32 TEG-90 (Tren Eléctrico de Guadalajara, 1990) cars were ordered in 1992 and were manufactured by Bombardier-Concarril SA, a subsidiary of Bombardier Transportation, which had acquired Concarril that year; the TEG-90 cars were built in the same factory as the earlier batch of TLG-88 cars. The first car was delivered in November 1993. The TEG-90 are cosmetically similar to the TLG-88 but use propulsion equipment from Siemens. Both the TLG-88 and TEG-90 are derived from the Stadtbahnwagen B design.

SITEUR ordered 18 Barcelona Metro 9000 Series from Alstom for Line 3 in 2014. The rolling stock for Line 3 uses three-car train consists and are equipped with air conditioning; trains can reach a peak speed of 90 km/h (56 mph).

In 2015 SITEUR ordered 12 TEG-15 (Tren Eléctrico de Guadalajara, 2015) cars, also from Bombardier, for Line 1. The TEG-15 is based on the TE-12 design for Servicio de Transportes Eléctricos del Distrito Federal in Mexico City.

SITEUR ordered 12 TEG-23 (Tren Eléctrico de Guadalajara, 2023) cars from CRRC Zhuzhou in 2023 for operation on Line 4. The two-section trains, which are equipped with air conditioning and have a capacity of 300 passengers, entered service alongside Line 4 in December 2025.

Model	Image	Manufacturer	Year built	Quantity	Operating lines
TLG-88		Concarril-Melmex (Mitsubishi)	1988	16	Line 2
TEG-90		Bombardier-Siemens	1993–1994	32	Lines 1 and 2
TEG-15		Bombardier	2015	12	Line 1
Barcelona Metro 9000 Series		Alstom	2016	18	Line 3
TEG-23		CRRC Zhuzhou Locomotive	2023–2024	12	Line 4

== Gallery ==
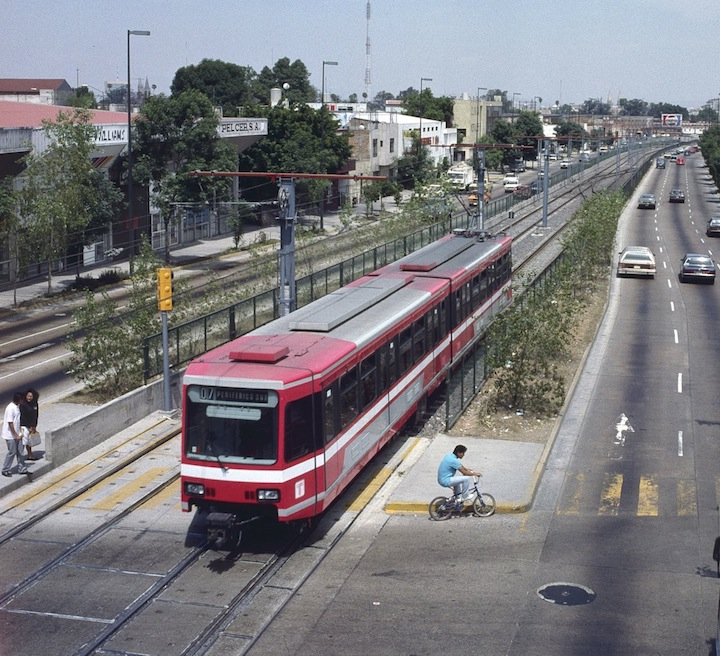
Line 1 runs at-grade south and north of the city center and has several level crossings.

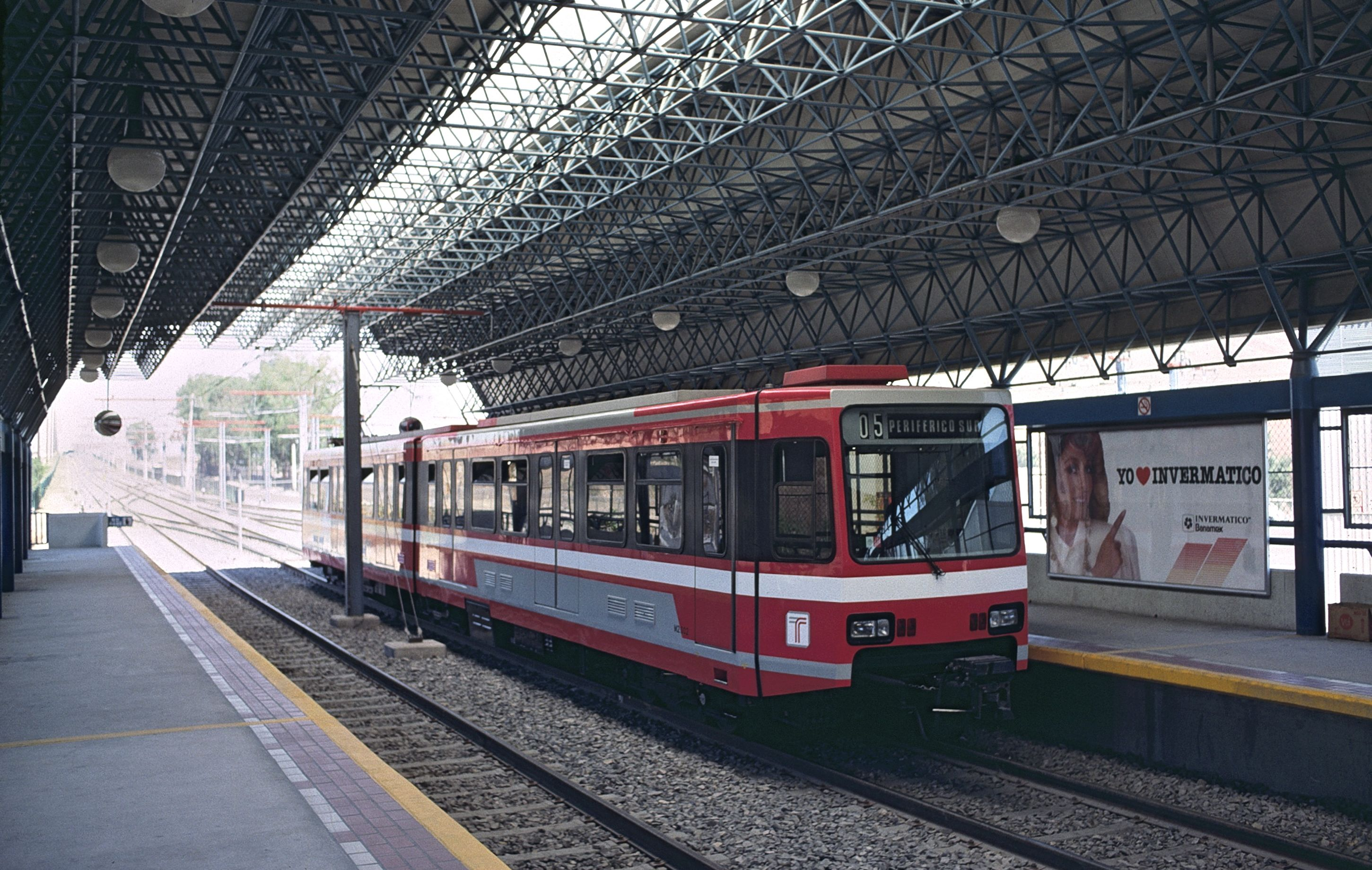
Car 002, built in 1988 by Concarril, laying over at Periférico Sur station, the southern terminus of Line 1, in 1990.

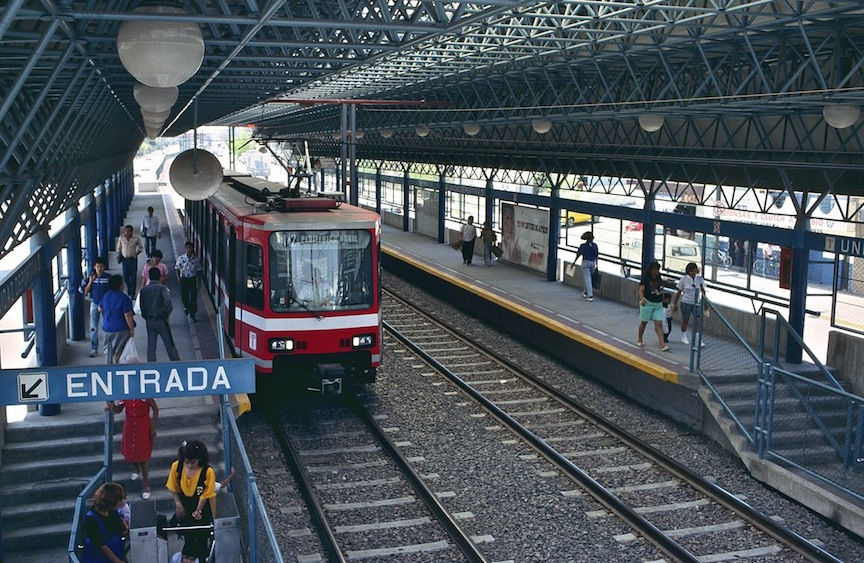
Unidad Deportiva station on Line 1 (1990)

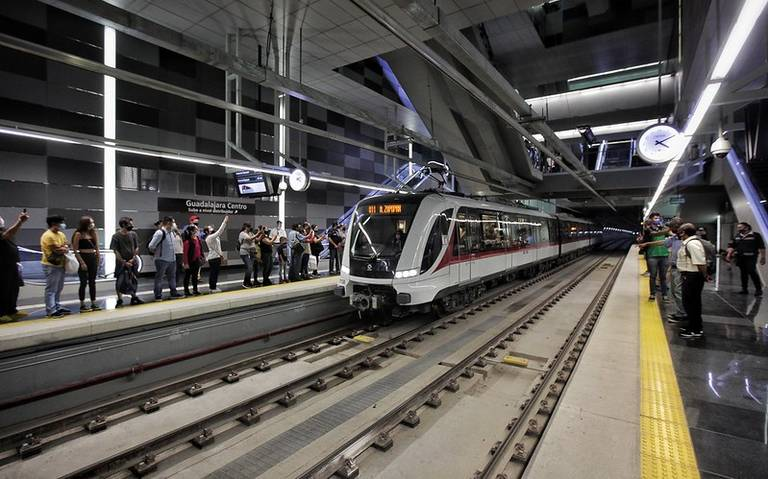
Guadalajara Centro station of Line 3 in 2020

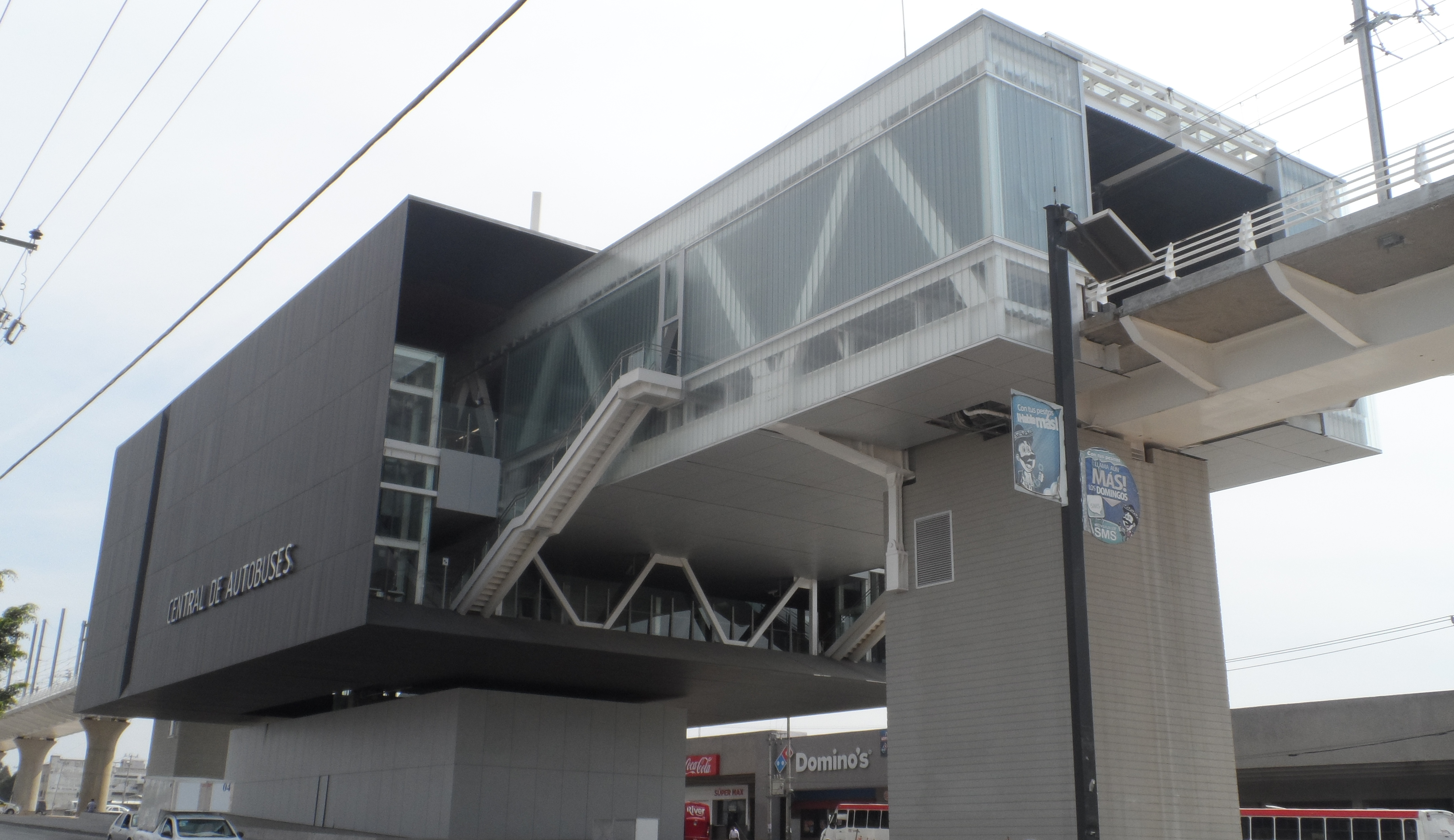
Central de Autobuses station on Line 3

== See also ==
- Sistema Integral del Tren Ligero
- Guadalajara Mi Macro
- Light rail in North America
- List of Latin American rail transit systems by ridership
- List of North American light rail systems by ridership
- Trolleybuses in Guadalajara
