= Zapopan Centro metro station =

Metro rail station in Zapopan, Jalisco, Mexico

Zapopan Centro
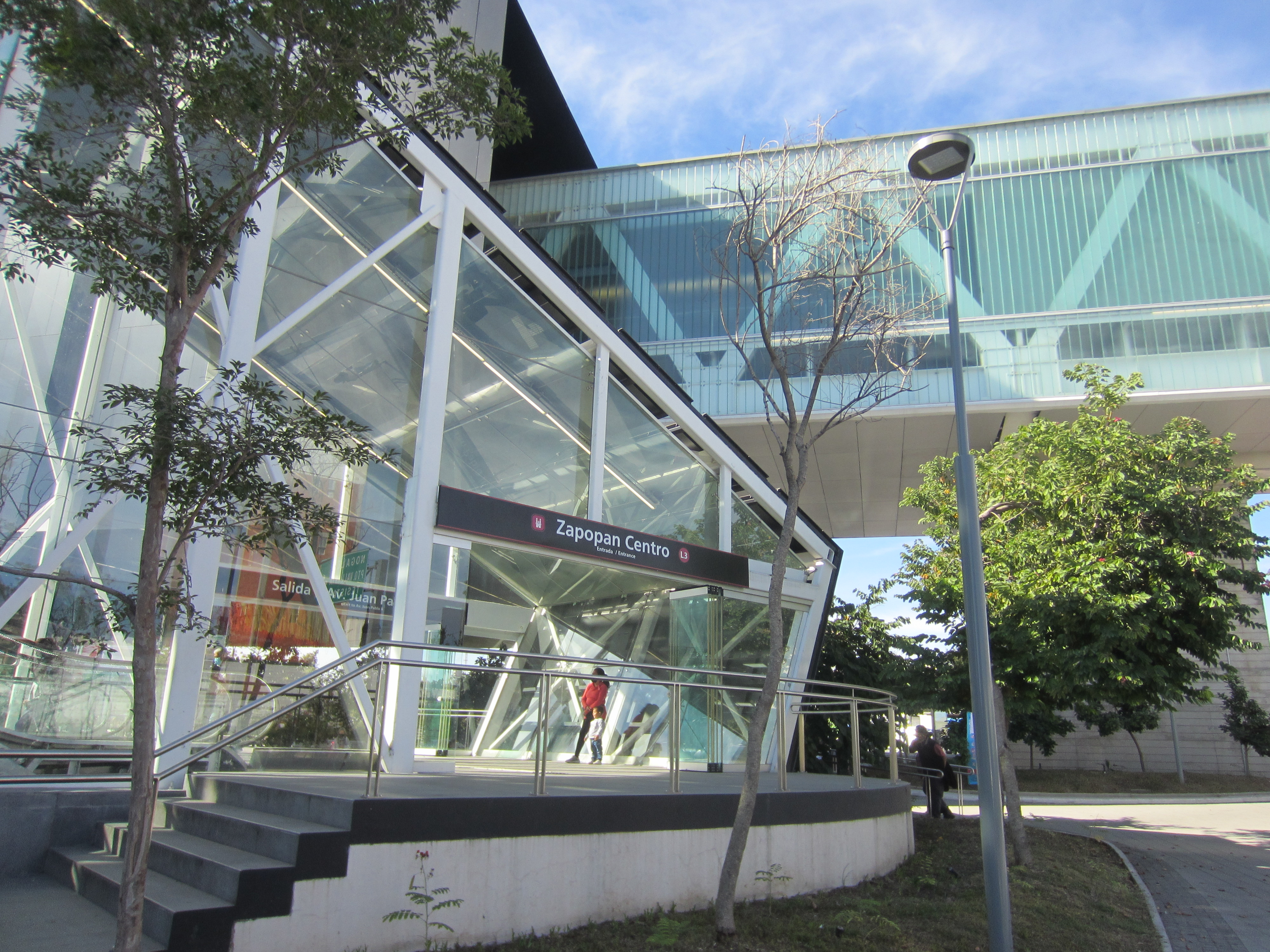
- The station's exterior in 2021

General information
- Location: Zapopan; Jalisco, Mexico
- Coordinates: 20°43′14″N 103°23′13″W
- System: SITEUR light rail
- Line: 3

Construction
- Structure type: Elevated
- Cycle facilities: Yes
- Accessible: Yes

History
- Opened: 2020

Services
Preceding station	Sistema de Tren Eléctrico Urbano	Following station
Mercado del Mar towards Arcos de Zapopan	Line 3	Plaza Patria towards Central de Autobuses
Location

The Zapopan Centro metro station is the fifteenth station in Line 3 of the Guadalajara urban rail system, south-east to north-west, and the fourth in the opposite direction.

This station is located in the zone where Av. Juan Pablo II in Zapopan branches west through Av. Manuel Ávila Camacho and south through Av. Américas. Under the station a vehicular underpass was opened in 13 January 2018 after being under construction for 3 years. The objective of the underpass was to speed up car traffic in the zone.

Grupo Editorial Reforma revealed that groundwater tables invaded by the construction in this zone could explain the delay in the development of the infrastructure.

The station logotype is a stylized picture of the Basílica de Zapopan entrance.

== Points of interest ==
- Basílica de Nuestra Señora de Zapopan
- San Pedro Apóstol Parish
- Zapopan Down-town Colony
- Zapopan Municipal Palace
- Colegio de Jalisco

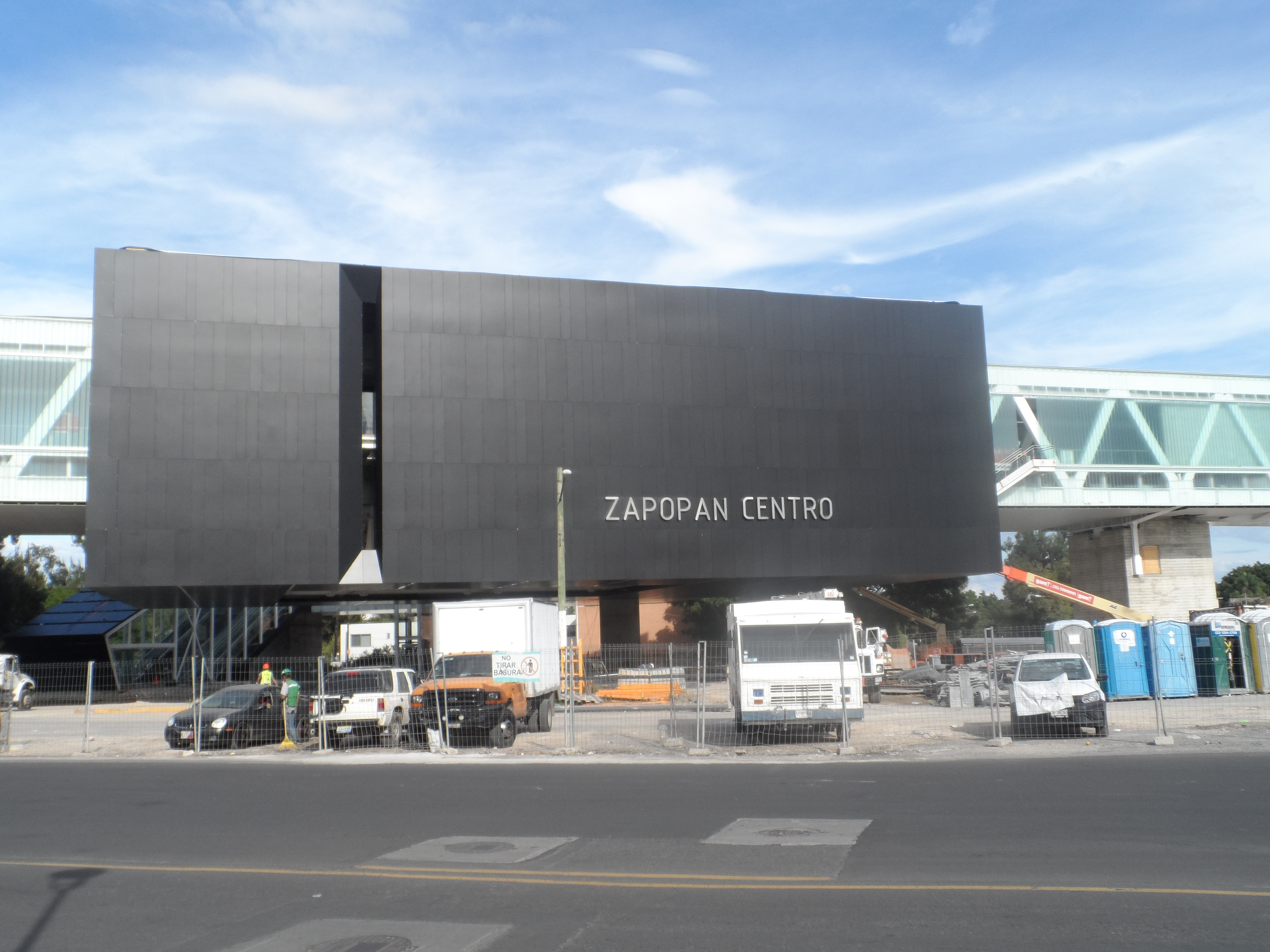
External view of the Zapopan Centro metro station.

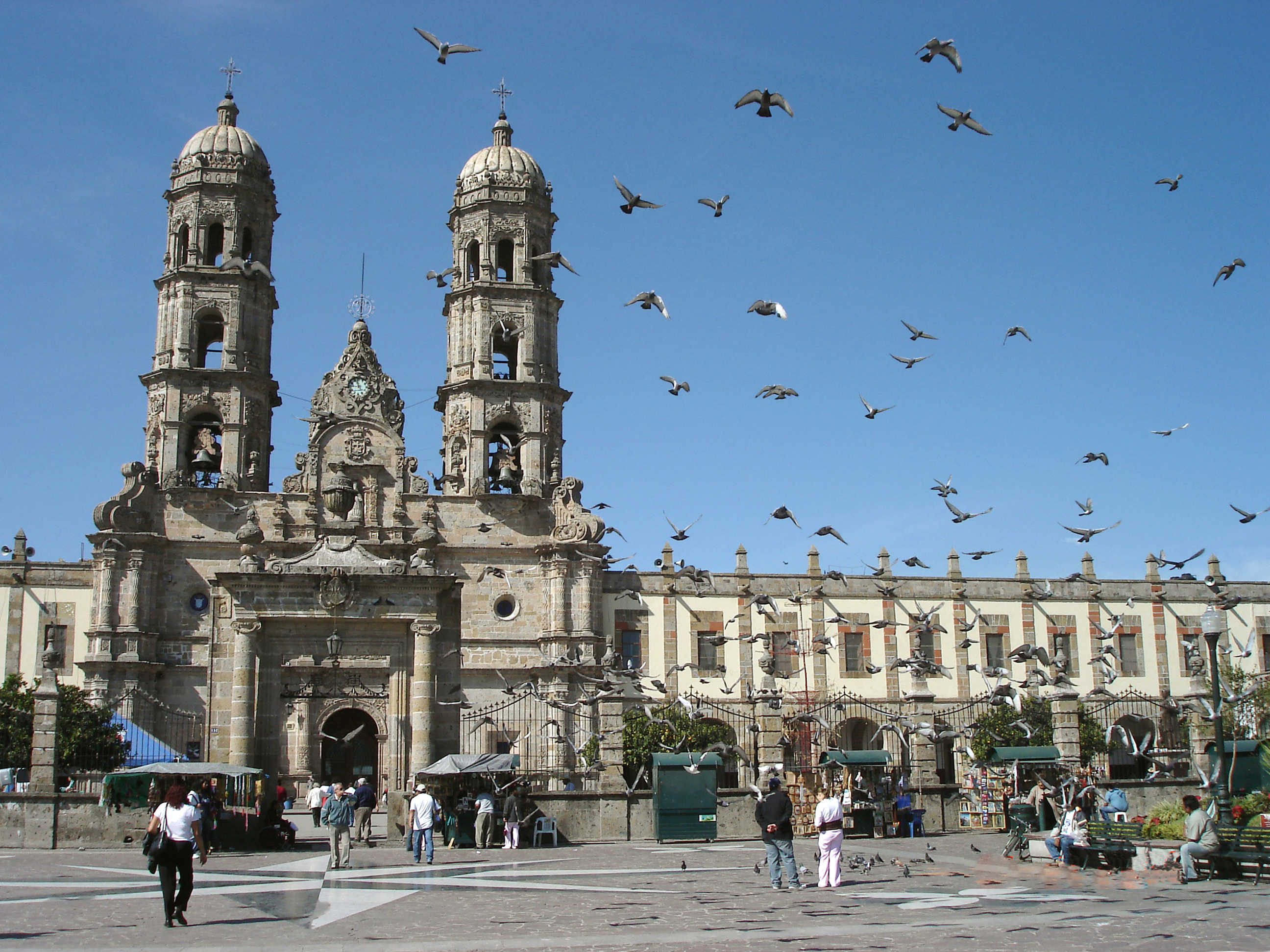
The Basílica de Zapopan, main point of interest near the station.
