= Santuario Mártires de Cristo Rey light rail station =

Railway station in Guadalajara, Jalisco

Coordinates: 20.6138°N 103.3956°W

Santuario Mártires de Cristo Rey
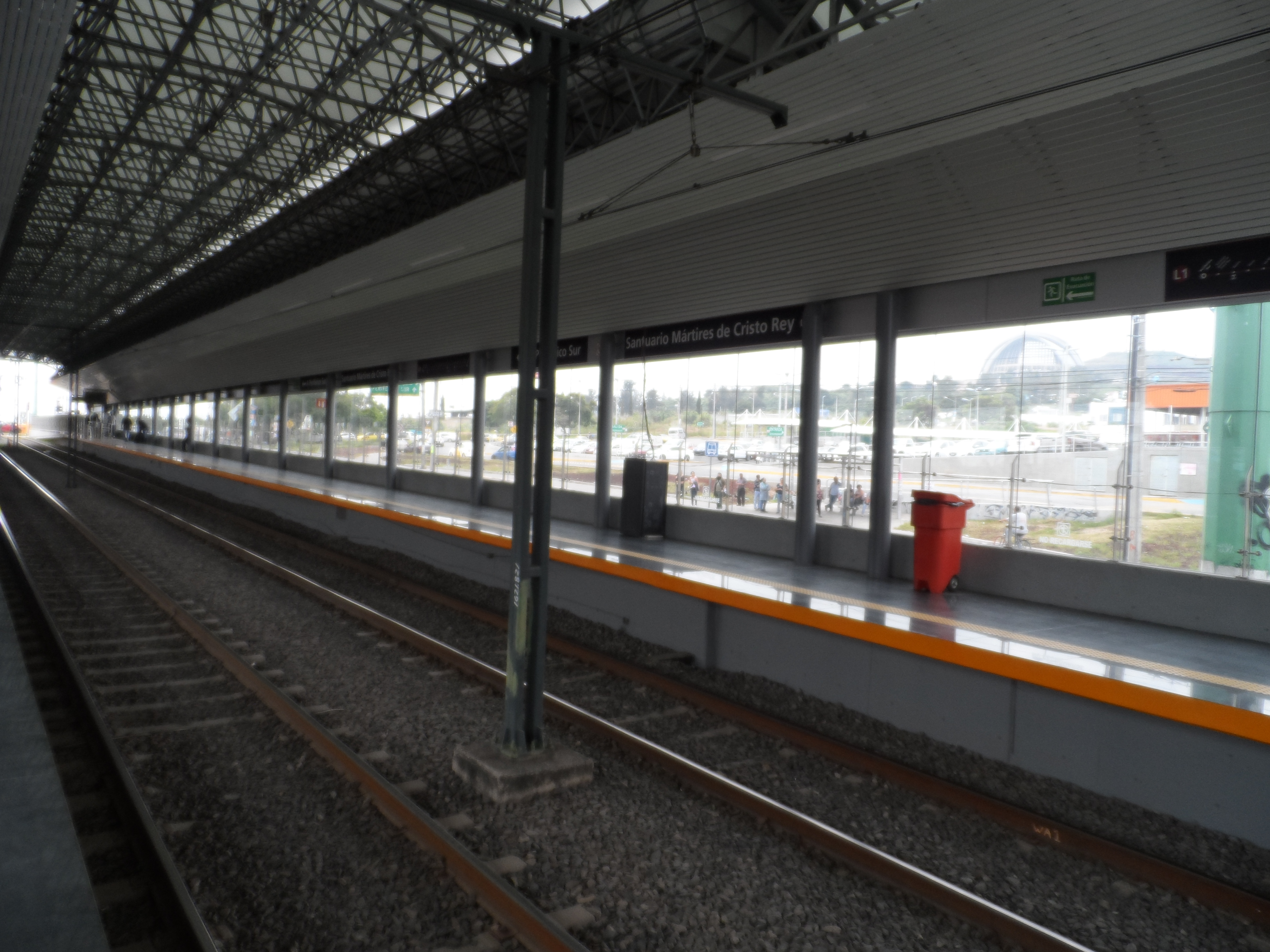
- Santuario Mártires de Cristo Rey light rail station

General information
- Location: Colón and Tesoro avenues Guadalajara; Jalisco, Mexico
- System: SITEUR light rail
- Operator: SITEUR
- Line: 1
- Platforms: 3
- Tracks: 2

Construction
- Structure type: Overground
- Cycle facilities: Yes
- Accessible: Yes

History
- Opened: 1 September 1989; 36 years ago (as Tesoro railway station); 15 November 2011; 14 years ago (renamed Santuario Mártires de Cristo Rey railway station)
- Former names: Tesoro light rail station

Services
Preceding station	Sistema de Tren Eléctrico Urbano	Following station
España towards Auditorio	Line 1	Periférico Sur Terminus
Location

Santuario Mártires de Cristo Rey (formerly Tesoro) is the nineteenth station from north to south, and the second in the opposite direction, of Line 1 of the Sistema de Tren Eléctrico Urbano in Guadalajara, Jalisco. It is also one of the stations that make up the southern overground section that runs along Avenida Cristóbal Colón.

It takes its name from the Santuario de los Mártires de Cristo Rey ("Sanctuary of the Martyrs") built on top of Cerro del Tesoro near the station. Its logo is a stylized image of the controversial temple with its monumental dome highlighted by a cross.

It serves the Nueva España, Balcones de Santa María and Fraccionamiento Cerro del Tesoro neighborhoods.

== History ==
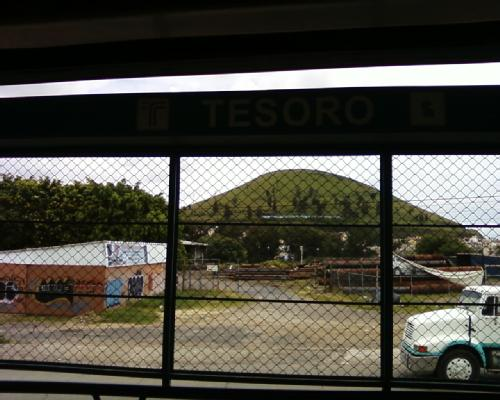
Tesoro light rail station before being renamed

The original name of the station was "Tesoro light rail station" due to its proximity to the intersection of Avenida del Tesoro, which leads to the homonymous hill. The name change was made by the Government of Jalisco in the six-year period 2007–2013, under the influence of the Archdiocese of Guadalajara, to encourage "religious tourism" to the sanctuary in honor of the Mexican Martyrs. Its original logo was the image of a chest with coins, representing a treasure.

== Points of interest ==
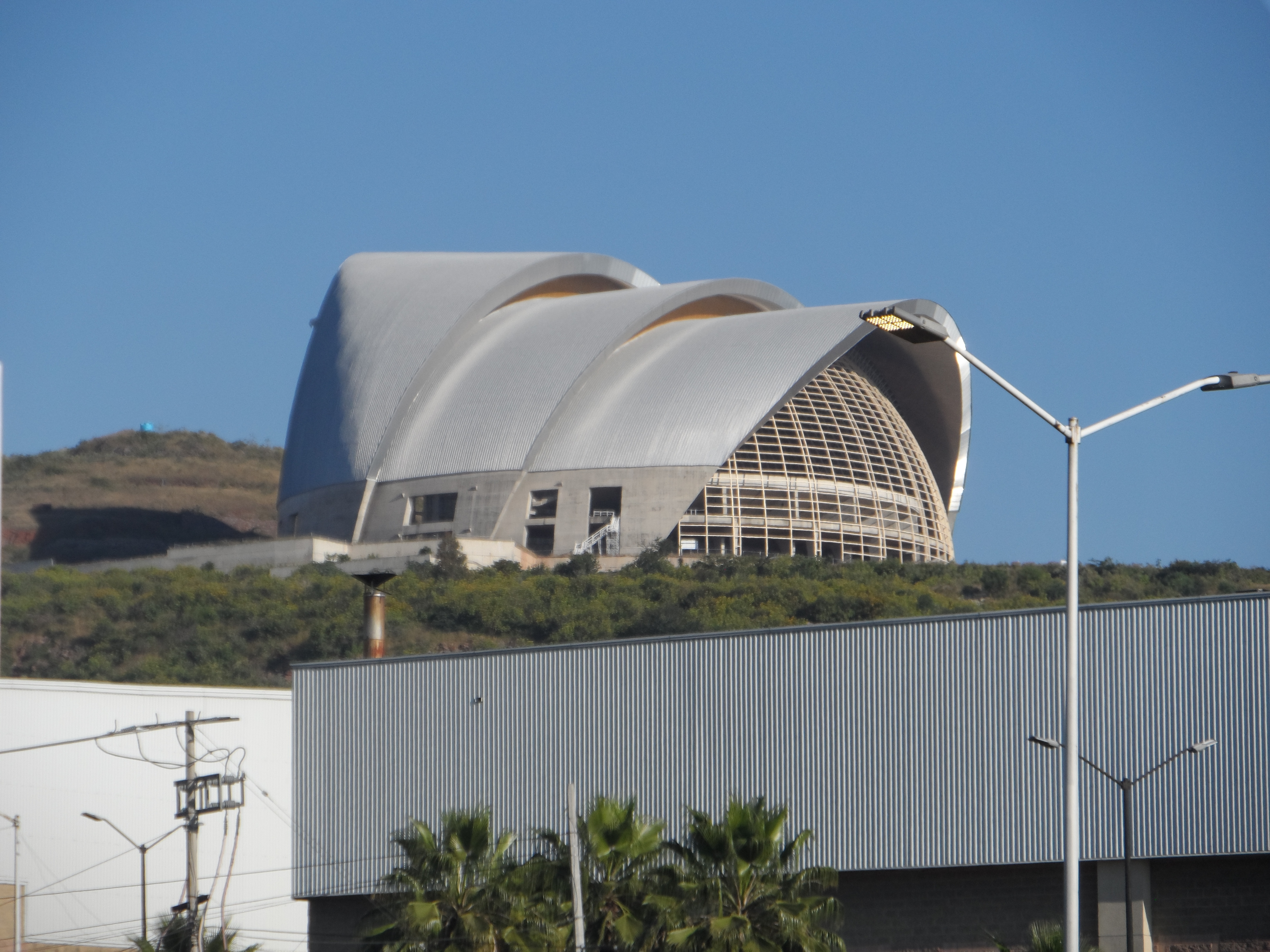
Santuario de los Mártires Mexicanos de Guadalajara, over the Cerro del Tesoro

- Santuario de los Mártires Mexicanos (under construction)
- Cerro del Tesoro, on the west side of Colón avenue
- Cerro de Santa María, on the east side of Colón avenue
