= TEG-15 =

Light rail vehicle

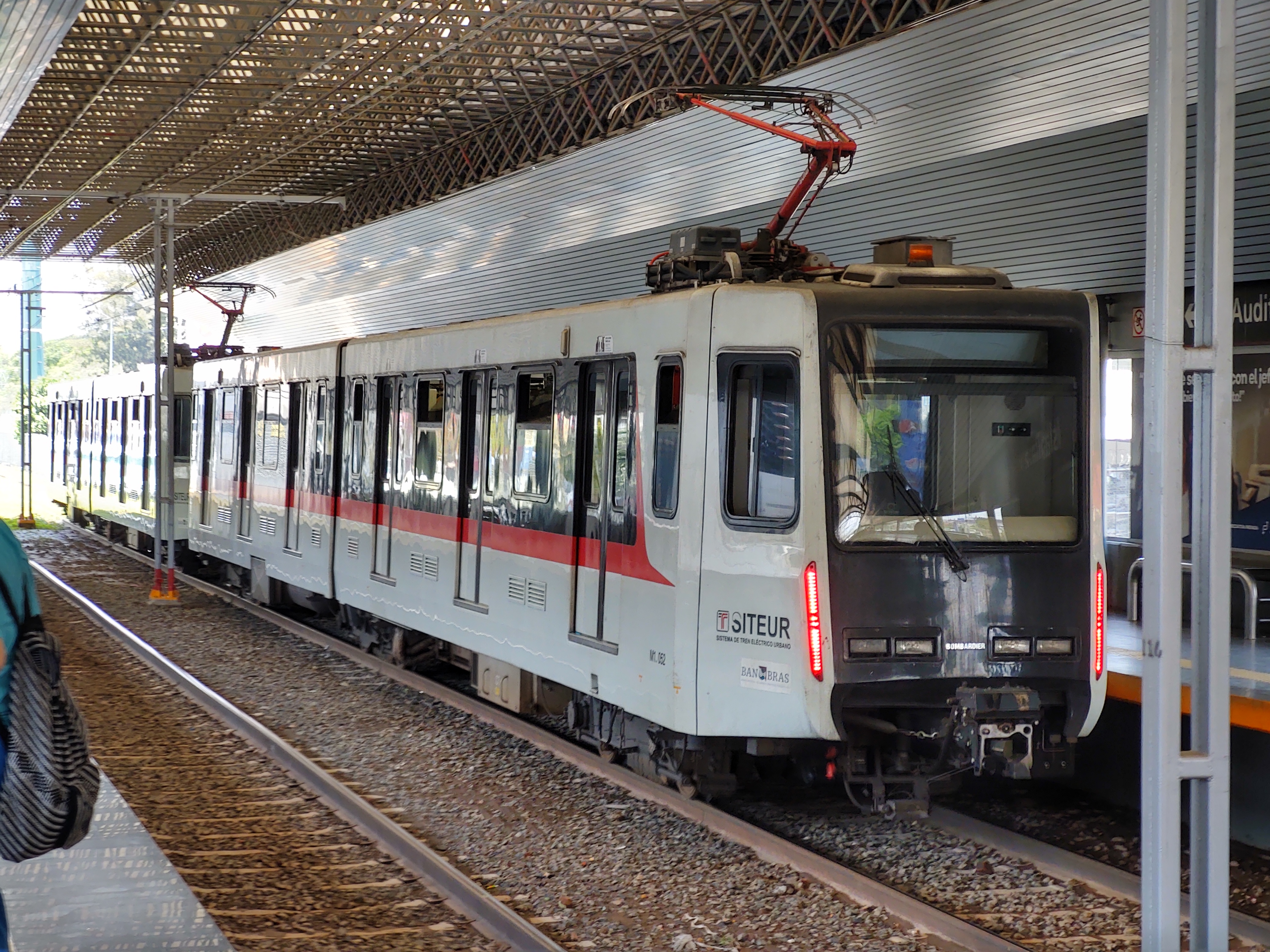
- A TEG-15 at the Isla Raza station for Line 1 of SITEUR
- Stock type: Electric multiple unit
- Manufacturer: Bombardier Transportation México
- Constructed: 2015–2017

Specifications
- Train length: 28 metres (92 ft)
- Width: 2.65 metres (8.7 ft)
- Height: 2.5 metres (8.2 ft)
- Maximum speed: 80 kilometres per hour (50 mph)
- Track gauge: 1,435 mm (4 ft 8 1/2 in)

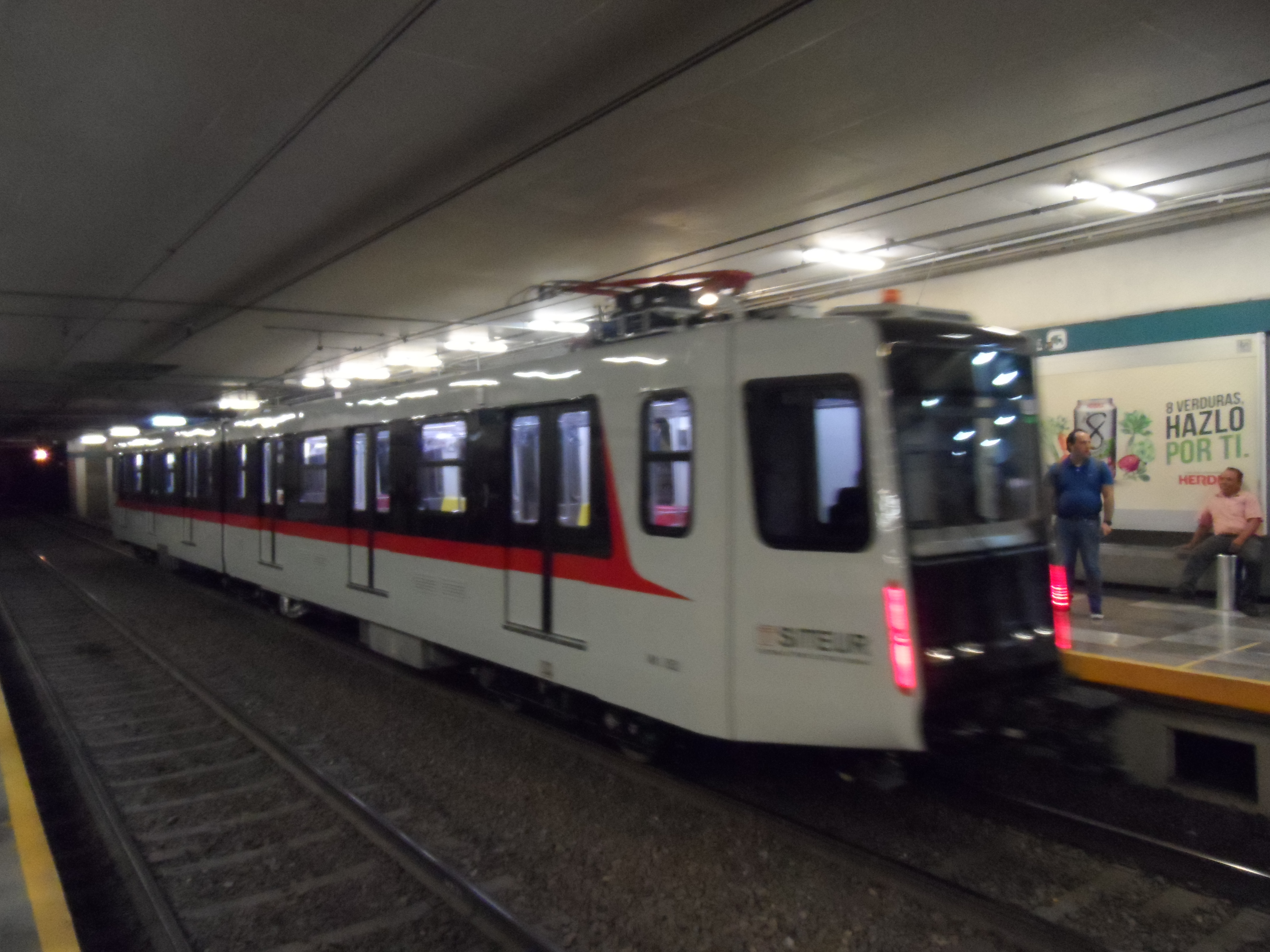

The TEG-15 is a model of light rail vehicle manufactured by Bombardier Transportation for the Sistema de Tren Eléctrico Urbano. Twelve other firms competed for the Guadalajara contract. The contract was awarded in late 2015, and was completed in approximately two years.

== Design ==
The vehicles are 29.56 m (96 ft 11 3/4 in) long, and designed with a top speed of 80 km/h (49.7 mph). The vehicles were designed with seats for 40 passengers, and a maximum capacity of 250 individuals.

== Operational history ==
The first two vehicle set was delivered in March 2017. The final of the twelve was delivered in early November 2017.
