= Juárez light rail station =

Juárez
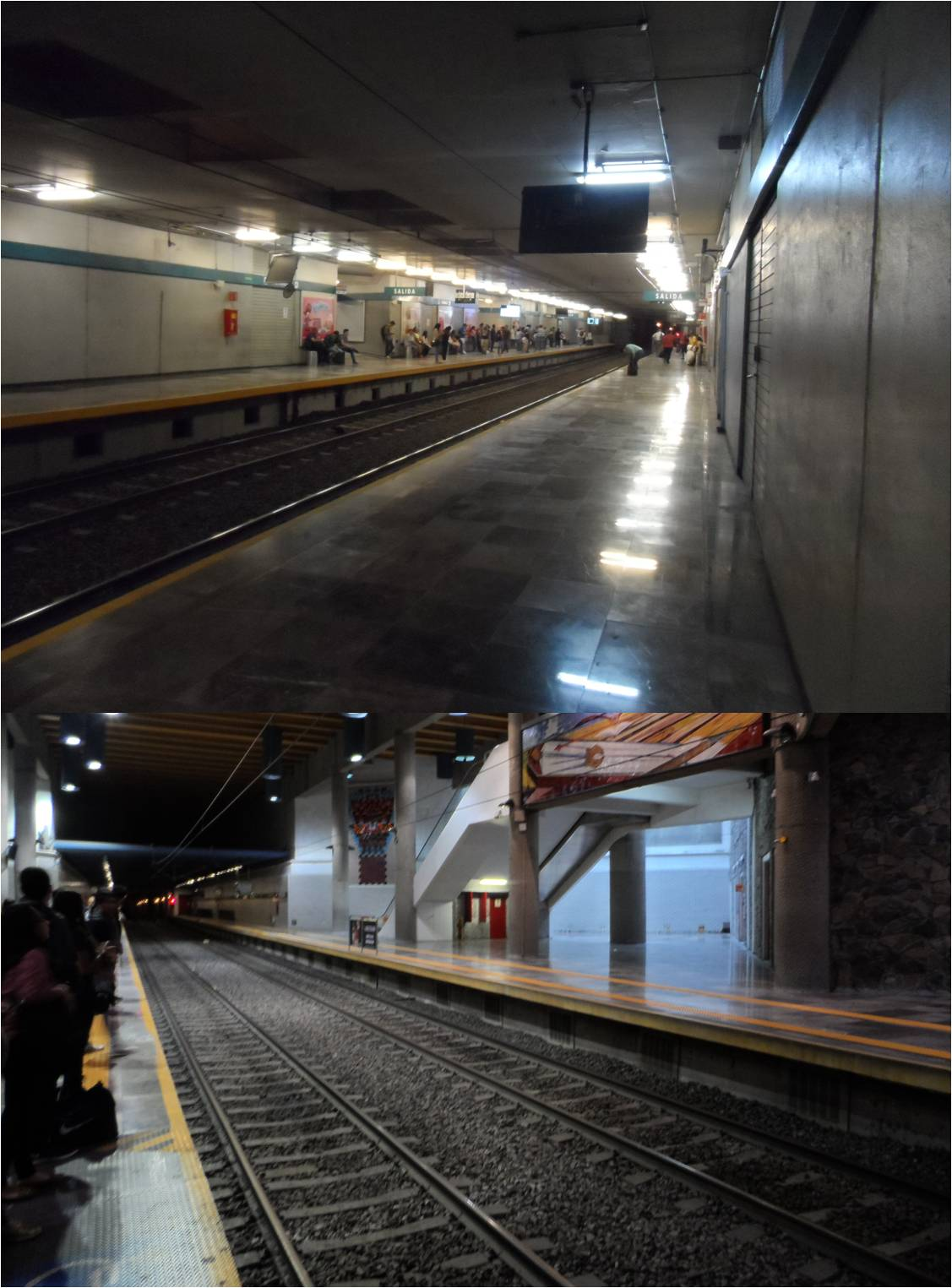
- Juárez SITEUR railway station

General information
- Location: Guadalajara; Jalisco, Mexico
- Coordinates: 20°40′29″N 103°21′17″W
- System: SITEUR light rail
- Lines: 1 and 2

Construction
- Structure type: Underground
- Platform levels: 2
- Cycle facilities: Yes
- Accessible: Yes

History
- Opened: Line 1:1976; 50 years ago (for trolleybuses); 1989; 37 years ago (for light rail); Line 2: 1994; 32 years ago

Services
Preceding station	Sistema de Tren Eléctrico Urbano	Following station
Refugio towards Auditorio	Line 1	Mexicaltzingo towards Periférico Sur
Terminus	Line 2	Plaza Universidad towards Tetlán
Location

Juarez is a station on both lines 1 and 2 of the Sistema de Tren Eléctrico Urbano in the Guadalajara Metropolitan Area, Mexico. It is located at the intersection of Del Federalismo Sur with Avenida Benito Juarez.

The Art Gallery of SITEUR (Sistema de Tren Eléctrico Urbano) is located here, exhibiting works by international artists. The station also hosts various cultural events, such as the book fair, lectures on the history of the neighborhoods of Guadalajara, storytelling, puppet shows, and plays for children, among other activities.

== Points of interest ==
- Parque de la Revolución
- Rectory of the University of Guadalajara
- Templo Expiatorio del Santísimo Sacramento
