= Periférico Norte light rail station =

Station of Line 1 of the Guadalajara light raíl system

Periférico Norte
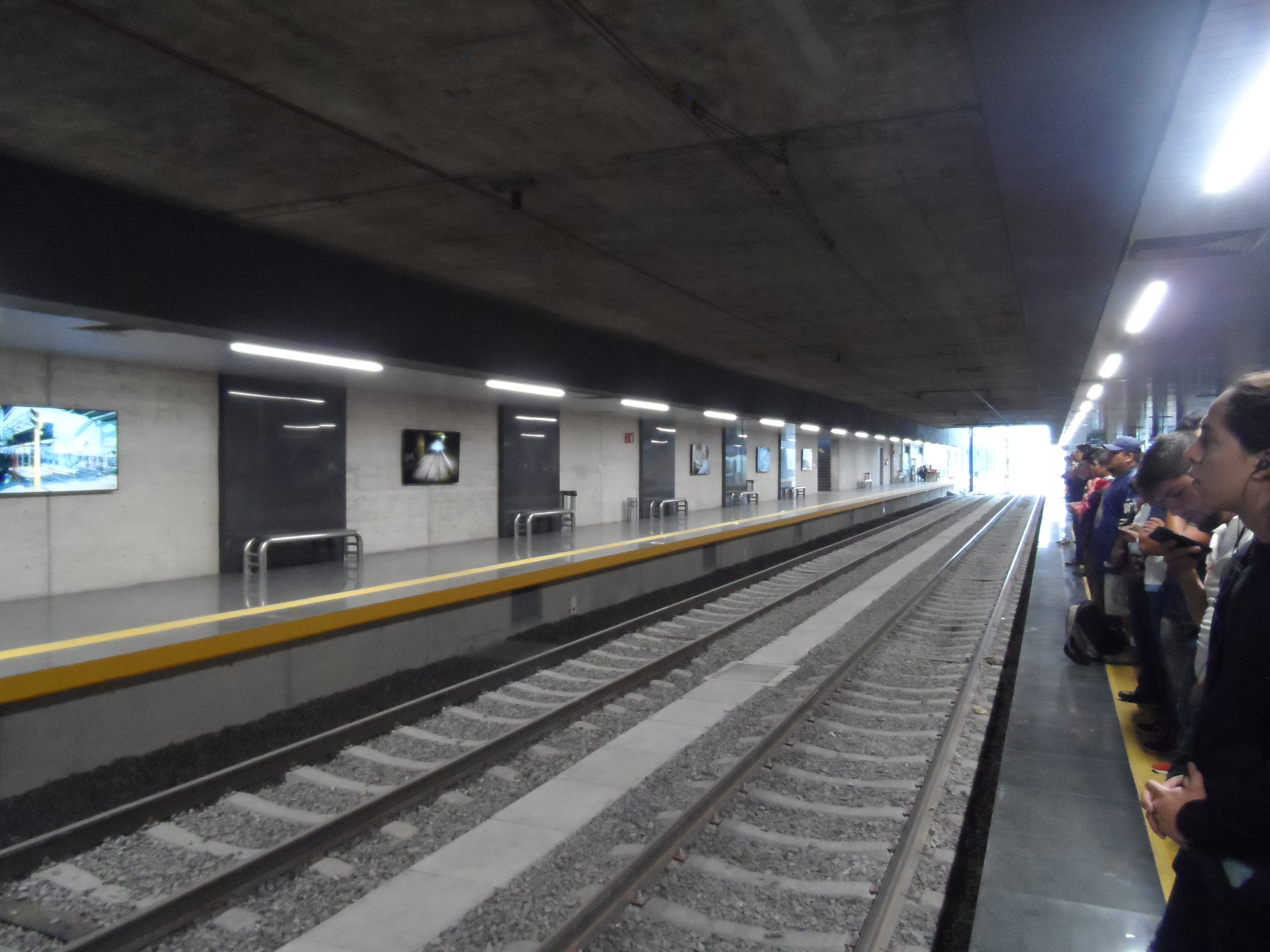
- Periférico Norte SITEUR railway station

General information
- Location: Guadalajara; Jalisco, Mexico
- Coordinates: 20°43′52″N 103°21′08″W
- System: SITEUR light rail
- Line: 1
- Tracks: 2

Construction
- Structure type: Trench
- Platform levels: 2
- Cycle facilities: Yes
- Accessible: Yes

History
- Opened: 1 September 1989; 36 years ago (overground station)
- Rebuilt: 16 September 2017; 8 years ago (underground station)

Services
Preceding station	Sistema de Tren Eléctrico Urbano	Following station
Auditorio Terminus	Line 1	Dermatológico towards Periférico Sur
Location

Periférico Norte is the second station of Line 1 of the Guadalajara light rail system from north to south, and the nineteenth in the opposite direction. This station is underground.

The station is under the intersection of the Calzada Federalismo with the North Peripheral Ring (Spanish: Anillo Periférico Norte), to which its name alludes. This station is located in a strategic area, since it connects with various bus routes that meet the demand of the municipalities of Zapopan, Guadalajara, Tonalá and Tlaquepaque.

Its logo represents a ring divided into two poles with the upper one highlighted, indicating that it is north.

== History ==
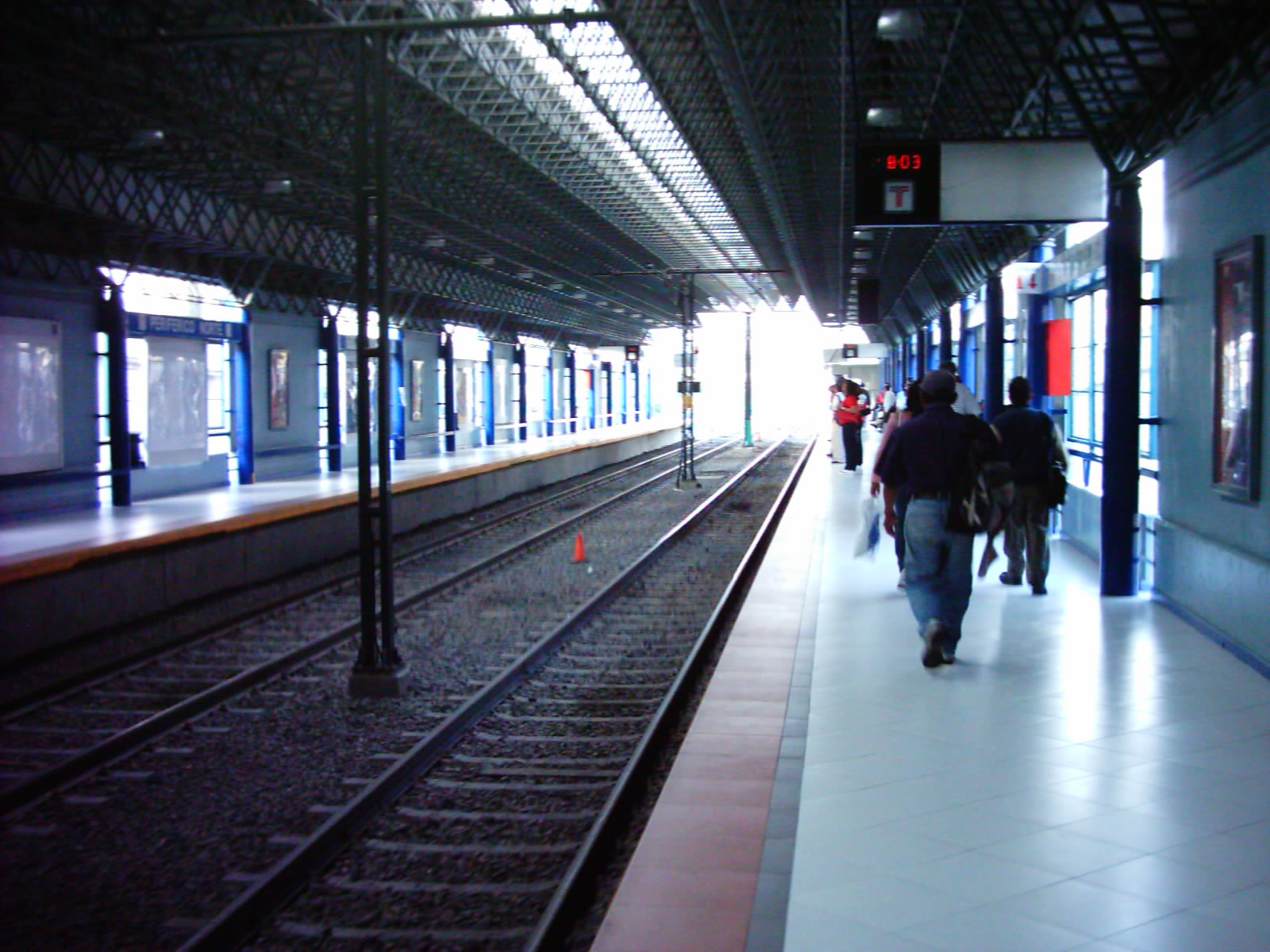
The Periferico Norte station before being demolished.

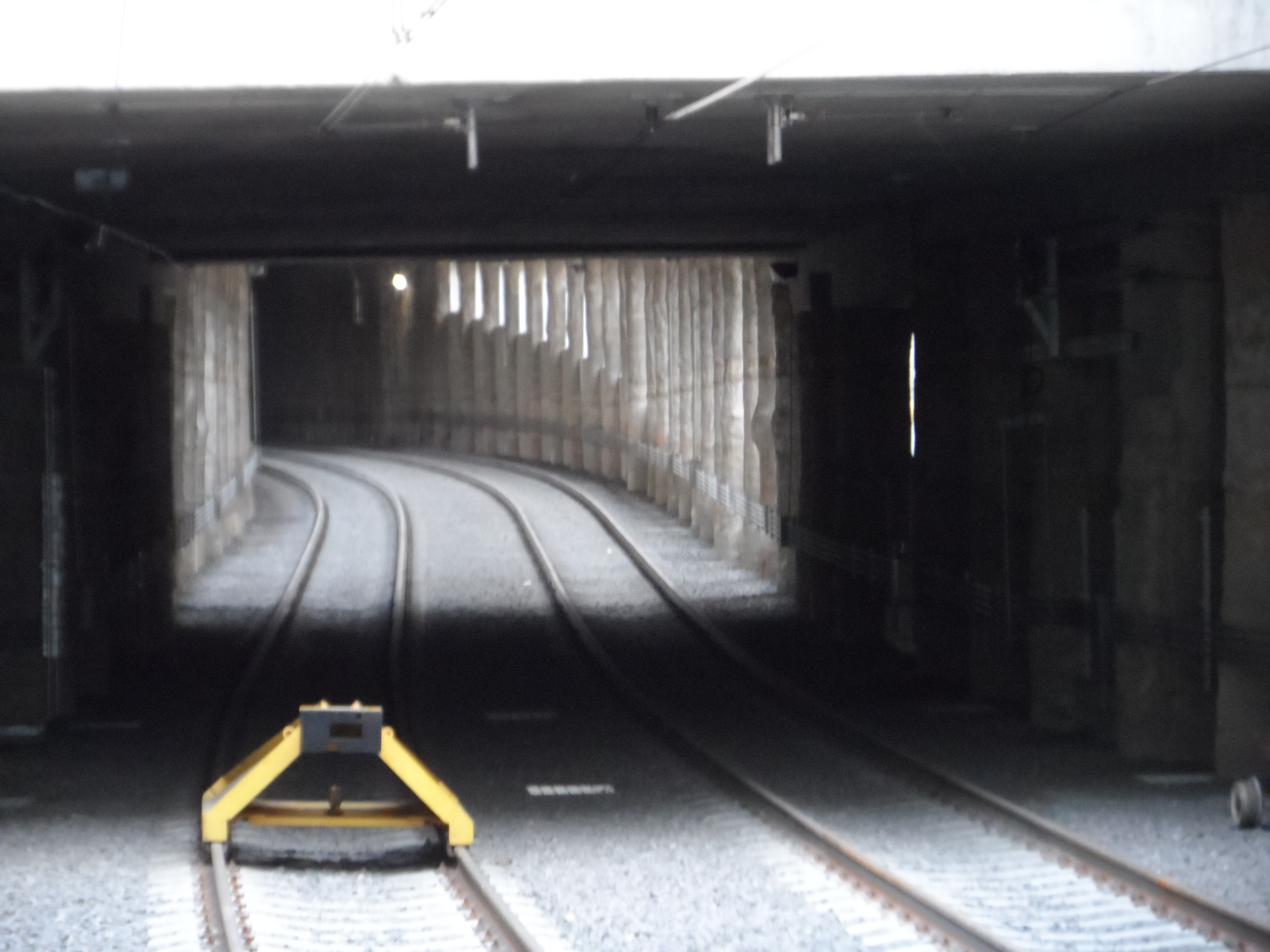
The first underground section of Line 1, between the Periférico Norte and Auditorio stations.

Originally the Periferico Norte station was overground, but when the Line 1 expansion works began in August 2014, the station was demolished to build a more modern one under the North Peripheral Ring, along with an underpass for cars that circulate on Calzada Federalismo. The new station was opened on 16 September 2017, and more than a year later, on 22 November 2018, the new terminal of Line 1 was inaugurated: the Auditorio station, located 1 km north from the Periferico Norte station.

== Accidents ==
On 26 January 2015 a collision between two trains was recorded when the driver of the vehicle T-06 was driving without due caution and care, since he had the distance and time to avoid the collision and did not brake in time. It was a mishap between trains caused by a communication error between the drivers and the dispatcher.

== Points of interest ==
- Benito Juárez Auditorium
- González Ortega Housing Unit.

== Transport routes nearby ==
- Periférico Norte station of Mi Macro Periférico
