= Line 2 (Sistema de Tren Eléctrico Urbano) =

Railway line in Guadalajara, Mexico

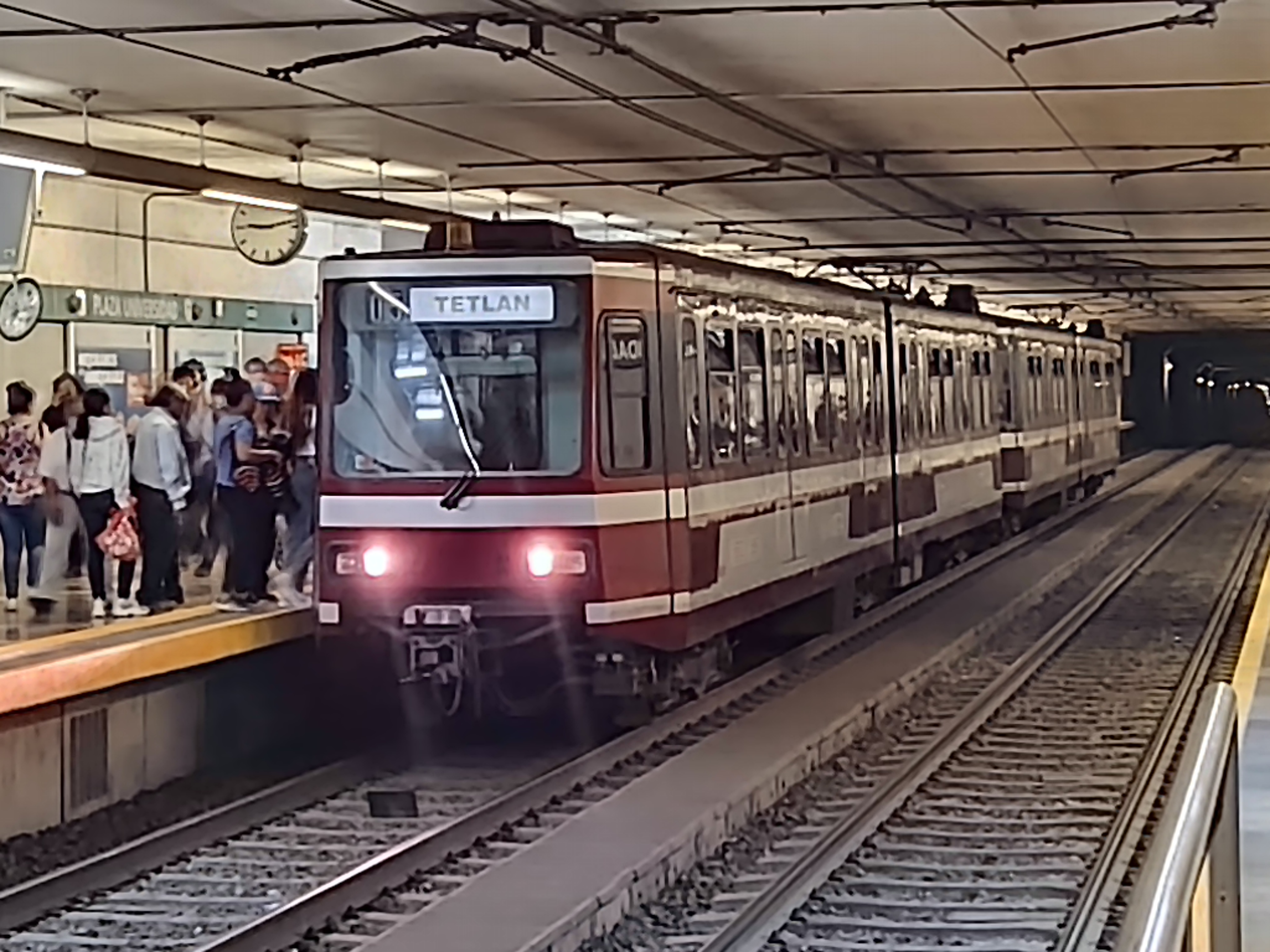
- Plaza Universidad station

Overview
- Owner: Jalisco Government
- Area served: Jalisco
- Locale: Guadalajara
- Transit type: Light rail
- Line number: 2
- Number of stations: 10
- Daily ridership: 240 000 (2016)
- Website: http://www.siteur.gob.mx/

Operation
- Began operation: 1 July 1994; 32 years ago
- Operator: SITEUR
- Rolling stock: TLG-88 (Concarril); TEG-90 (Bombardier and Siemens)
- Headway: 4 to 6 mins

Technical
- System length: 8.5 km (5.3 mi)
- Track gauge: 1,435 mm (4 ft 8 1/2 in) standard gauge
- Average speed: 30 km/h (18.64 mph)
- Top speed: 70 km/h (43.50 mph)
System map

Line 2 of the Guadalajara Urban Electric Train System is the second line built to optimise public transport by urban rail. It was constructed between January 1992 and June 1994. Its building cost was much higher than that of Line 1 because there was no existing infrastructure as was the case during Line 1's construction, and also because it involved the modification of drainage collectors in order to build new underground infrastructure.

Line 2
Last extension	July 1, 1994
Rolling stock	TLG-88, TEG-90
Platforms	150 m (492 ft 2 in)

The inauguration of this line took place on July 1, 1994, and was headed by the Governor of Jalisco Carlos Rivera Aceves and President Carlos Salinas de Gortari. Of the three existing lines, this is the shortest in the network and it is coloured green.

== Line stations ==
Logo	Name	Opened	Municipality	Transfer	Location	Coordinates
	Juárez	July 1, 1994	Guadalajara	Line 1 of the Guadalajara light rail system	Underground	20°40′29.62″N 103°21′18.53″W
	Plaza Universidad	July 1, 1994	Guadalajara	Line 3 of the Guadalajara light rail system	Underground	20°40′30.38″N 103°20′53.15″W
	San Juan de Dios	July 1, 1994	Guadalajara	Mi Macro Calzada	Underground	20°40′30.77″N 103°20′27.03″W
	Belisario Domínguez	July 1, 1994	Guadalajara	-	Underground	20°40′21.86″N 103°19′53.24″W
	Oblatos	July 1, 1994	Guadalajara	-	Underground	20°40′13.02″N 103°19′21″W
	Cristóbal de Oñate	July 1, 1994	Guadalajara	-	Underground	20°40′3.05″N 103°18′48.15″W
	San Andrés	July 1, 1994	Guadalajara	-	Underground	20°39′55.04″N 103°18′21.89″W
	San Jacinto	July 1, 1994	Guadalajara	-	Underground	20°39′49.98″N 103°17′50.2″W
	La Aurora	July 1, 1994	Guadalajara	-	Underground	20°39′44.89″N 103°17′7.96″W
	Tetlán	July 1, 1994	Guadalajara	-	Underground	20°39′35.23″N 103°16′33.49″W
