= Line 1 (Sistema de Tren Eléctrico Urbano) =

Guadalajara light rail line

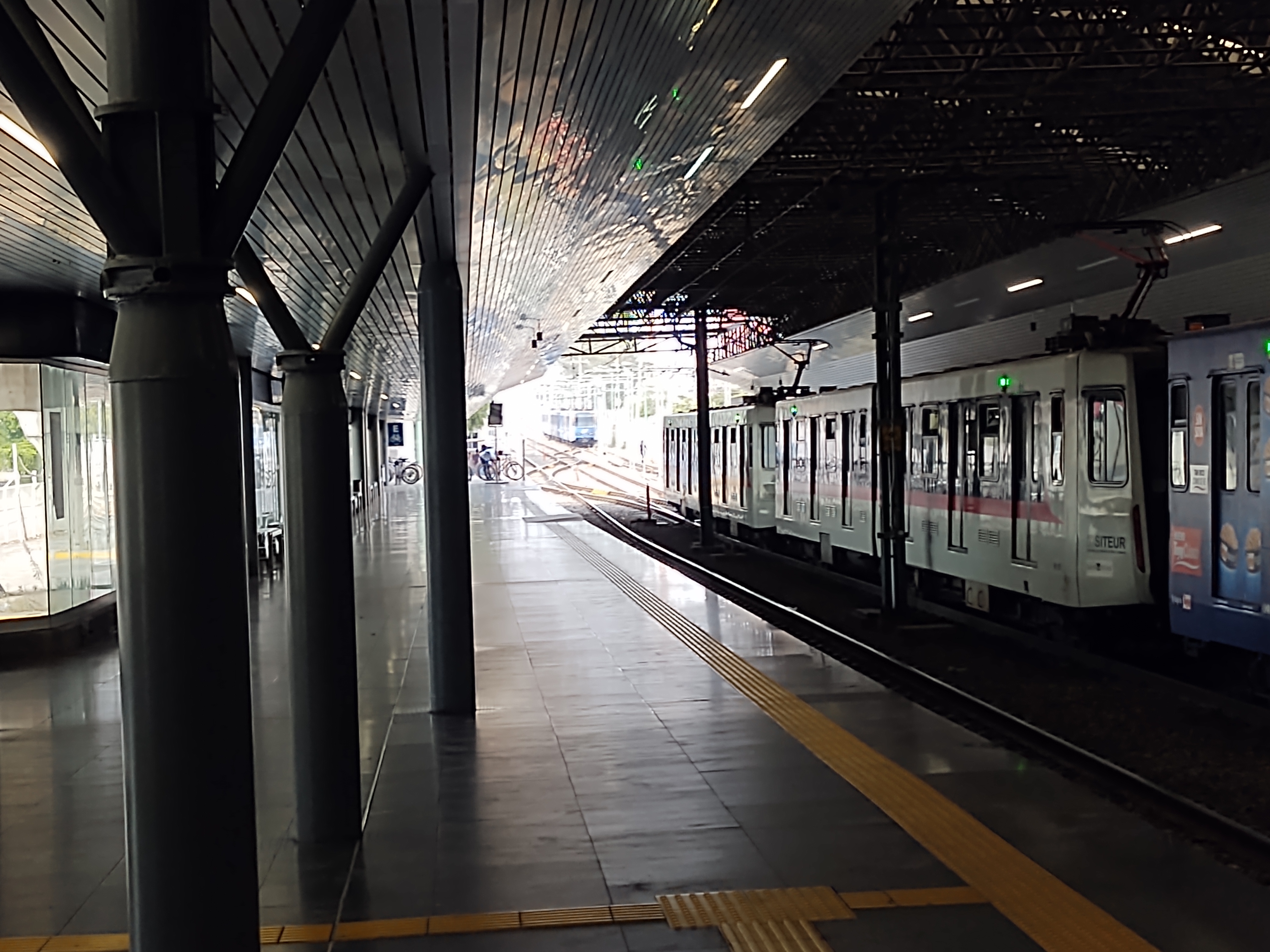
- Interior of the Periférico Sur station after its 2018 reconstruction

Overview
- Native name: Línea 1 del Tren Eléctrico Urbano de Guadalajara
- Area served: Guadalajara, Tlaquepaque and Zapopan
- Locale: Jalisco
- Transit type: Light rail
- Line number: 1
- Number of stations: 20
- Website: http://siteur.gob.mx

Operation
- Began operation: 1 September 1989; 37 years ago
- Operator: SITEUR
- Rolling stock: TEG-90 (Bombardier-Siemens); TEG-15 (Bombardier)
- Train length: Three carriages during peak hours; two during off-peak hours
- Headway: Monday to Saturday: 5 to 9 minutes Sundays and public holidays: 9 minutes

Technical
- System length: 16.5 km (10.3 mi)
- Track gauge: 1,435 mm (4 ft 8 1/2 in) standard gauge
- Average speed: 30 km/h (19 mph)
- Top speed: 70 km/h (43 mph)
System map

Line 1 of the Guadalajara Urban Electric Train System opened on 1 September 1989. It is the oldest line of the Sistema de Tren Eléctrico Urbano (SITEUR), or Urban Electric Train System in Guadalajara. It was previously coloured blue, but after the stations were remodeled between 2014 and 2018 it is now red.

Line 1
Last extension	November 22, 2018
Rolling stock	TEG-90, TEG-15
Platforms	90 m (295 ft 3 in)
Covered municipalities	Guadalajara, Zapopan, Tlaquepaque

The construction of this line's road infrastructure began in 1974 and finished in 1976, with the intention of implementing a metropolitan and railway public transportation system in Guadalajara. This did not happen, as federal resources were diverted, which led to the building of electric trolleybus lines instead.

In 1982 an overpass was built at the intersection of Avenida Colón with the Calzada Lázaro Cárdenas and was completed in 1984 (for the extension of the Guadalajara trolleybus) towards Avenida Miguel López de Legaspi, and its pre-construction began in 1988, extending it from peripheral to peripheral, and it was completed in February 1989, to later be inaugurated in September of that same year. The inauguration was headed by the then-governor of Jalisco, Guillermo Cosío Vidaurri, and by the former president of Mexico, Carlos Salinas de Gortari.

In August 2014 the extension of line 1 to the north began, where the current terminal is located: the Auditorio station, located 1 km (0.62 mi) from the Periférico Norte station; the new station was opened on November 23, 2018. Line 1 links the municipalities of Zapopan, Guadalajara and Tlaquepaque from north to south through the Calzada Federalismo/Avenida Cristóbal Colón.

== Line stations ==
Line 1 had 19 stations (12 on the surface in 2 sections, 6 underground and one in trench) when it first opened, but after the Auditorio station was added, the line now has 20 stations (11 on the surface in 2 sections, 8 underground in 2 sections and one in trench). The stations are described in the following table:

Logo	Name	Opening	Municipality	Transfers	Location	Coordinates
	Auditorio	November 22, 2018	Zapopan	–	Underground	20°44′17.01″N 103°20′58.45″W
	Periférico Norte	September 1st, 1989	Zapopan	Mi Macro Periférico	Underground/Trench	20°43′51.8″N 103°21′7.64″W
	Dermatológico	September 1st, 1989	Zapopan	–	Overground	20°43′15.33″N 103°21′11.97″W
	Atemajac	September 1st, 1989	Zapopan	–	Overground	20°42′57.79″N 103°21′15.75″W
	División del Norte	September 1st, 1989	Guadalajara	–	Underground	20°42′27.65″N 103°21′19.66″W
	Ávila Camacho	September 1st, 1989	Guadalajara	Line 3 of the Guadalajara light rail system	Underground	20°41′54.98″N 103°21′17.85″W
	Mezquitán	September 1st, 1989	Guadalajara	–	Underground	20°41′29.32″N 103°21′14.05″W
	Refugio	September 1st, 1989	Guadalajara	–	Underground	20°40′55.98″N 103°21′14.63″W
	Juárez	September 1st, 1989	Guadalajara	Line 2 of the Guadalajara light rail system	Underground	20°40′29.51″N 103°21′16.99″W
	Mexicaltzingo	September 1st, 1989	Guadalajara	–	Underground	20°40′0.92″N 103°21′19.29″W
	Washington	September 1st, 1989	Guadalajara	–	Underground	20°39′39.65″N 103°21′26.79″W
	Santa Filomena	September 1st, 1989	Guadalajara	–	Overground	20°39′15.48″N 103°21′49.1″W
	Unidad Deportiva	September 1st, 1989	Guadalajara	–	Overground	20°38′50.53″N 103°22′8.88″W
	Urdaneta	September 1st, 1989	Guadalajara	–	Overground	20°38′35.48″N 103°22′21.58″W
	18 de Marzo	September 1st, 1989	Guadalajara	–	Overground	20°38′17.51″N 103°22′36.8″W
	Isla Raza	September 1st, 1989	Guadalajara	–	Overground	20°37′58.15″N 103°22′49.93″W
	Patria	September 1st, 1989	Guadalajara	–	Overground	20°37′36.57″N 103°23′5.74″W
	España	September 1st, 1989	Guadalajara	–	Overground	20°37′17.17″N 103°23′21.61″W
	Santuario Mártires de Cristo Rey	September 1st, 1989	Guadalajara	–	Overground	20°36′49.55″N 103°23′44.36″W
	Periférico Sur	September 1st, 1989	Tlaquepaque	Mi Macro Periférico	Overground	20°36′26.36″N 103°24′3.24″W

== Future extensions and remodellings ==
Line 1 has been planned to extend to Arroyo Hondo in the north and Arroyo Seco in the south. All station platforms were extended to 90 metres (295 ft 3 in) to allow each train convoy to be extended to three cars instead of two.

== Accidents and incidents ==
On January 26, 2015, a collision between two trains was recorded when the driver of the vehicle T-06 was driving without due caution and care, since he had the distance and time to avoid the collision and did not brake in time. It was a mishap between trains caused by a communication error between the drivers and the dispatcher.

In March 2015, an elderly woman was run over next to the Santa Filomena station. Security footage exempted the driver of the unit involved from any responsibility.

On Friday, September 7, 2017, shortly after 11 in the morning, a truck collided with the perimeter fence of the northbound section of the railway between Patria and Isla Raza stations after the driver of the delivery truck lost control, claiming brake failure.

On Thursday, September 9, 2021, at the Refugio station around 10:00 in the morning, a blind man fell onto the tracks due to carelessness. The people waiting for the train tried to help him, but discovered he had died when they took him off the tracks.
