= Auditorio light rail station =

Coordinates: 20.738058°N 103.349569°W

Auditorio
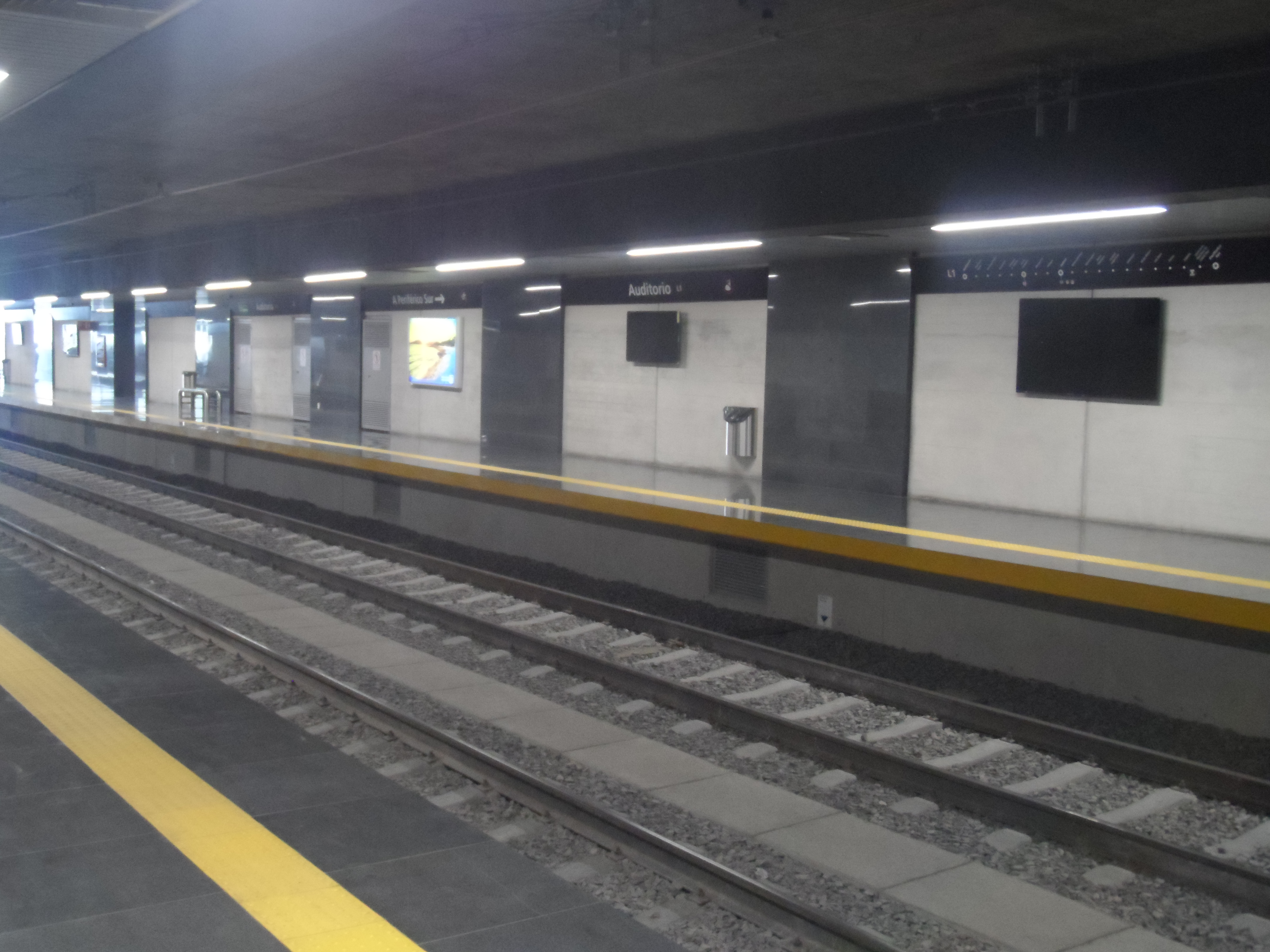
- Auditorio railway station

General information
- Location: Federalismo and Tratado de Tlatelolco; Zapopan; Jalisco, Mexico
- System: SITEUR light rail
- Operator: SITEUR
- Line: 1
- Platforms: 3
- Tracks: 2

Construction
- Structure type: Underground
- Cycle facilities: Yes
- Accessible: Yes

History
- Opened: November 12, 2018; 7 years ago

Services
Preceding station	Sistema de Tren Eléctrico Urbano	Following station
Terminus	Line 1	Periférico Norte towards Periférico Sur
Location

Auditorio is the first station of Line 1 of Guadalajara's light rail system from north to south, and the twentieth in the opposite direction. This station is underground.

The station is located at the intersection of Calzada Federalismo with Tratado of Tlatelolco street, in the municipality of Zapopan. Its construction was carried out together with that of a ramp that comes to the surface, which is used as a parking lot for trains and as a return to change from south-north to the opposite direction. This new station is the new terminus of Line 1 and is part of the renovation and expansion project for said line. The station was completed more than a year and a half ago and was inaugurated on November 22, 2018.

On November 26, 2018, there was a failure during the track change located forward of the station, so the station was closed to fix the track change, and it was reopened on November 28, 2018.

This station is located near the Arroyo Hondo and Tabachines neighborhoods, so it will serve to relieve a growing area of the city. The station's logo is a stylized image of the Benito Juárez Auditorium from which it takes its name and which is the venue for Guadalajara's Fiestas de Octubre.

== Points of interest ==
- Benito Juárez Auditorium (Fiestas de Octubre)
- Auditorio Municipal Market
- General Directorate of Public Safety, Civil Protection and Firefighters of Zapopan
- Green Cross Federalismo
- Freeway to Saltillo

== Gallery ==
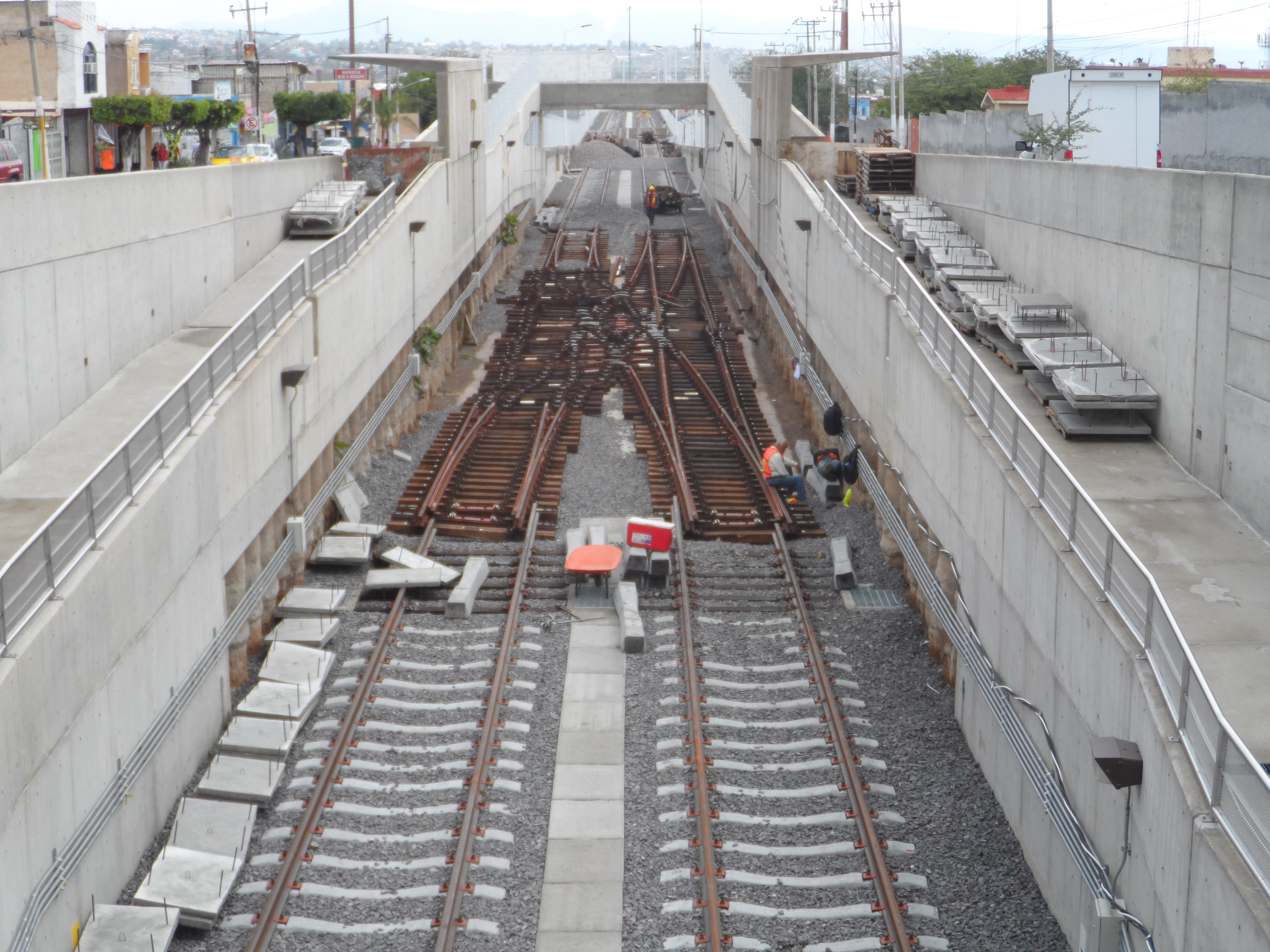
The change of track forward of the Auditorio station as of June 11, 2017.

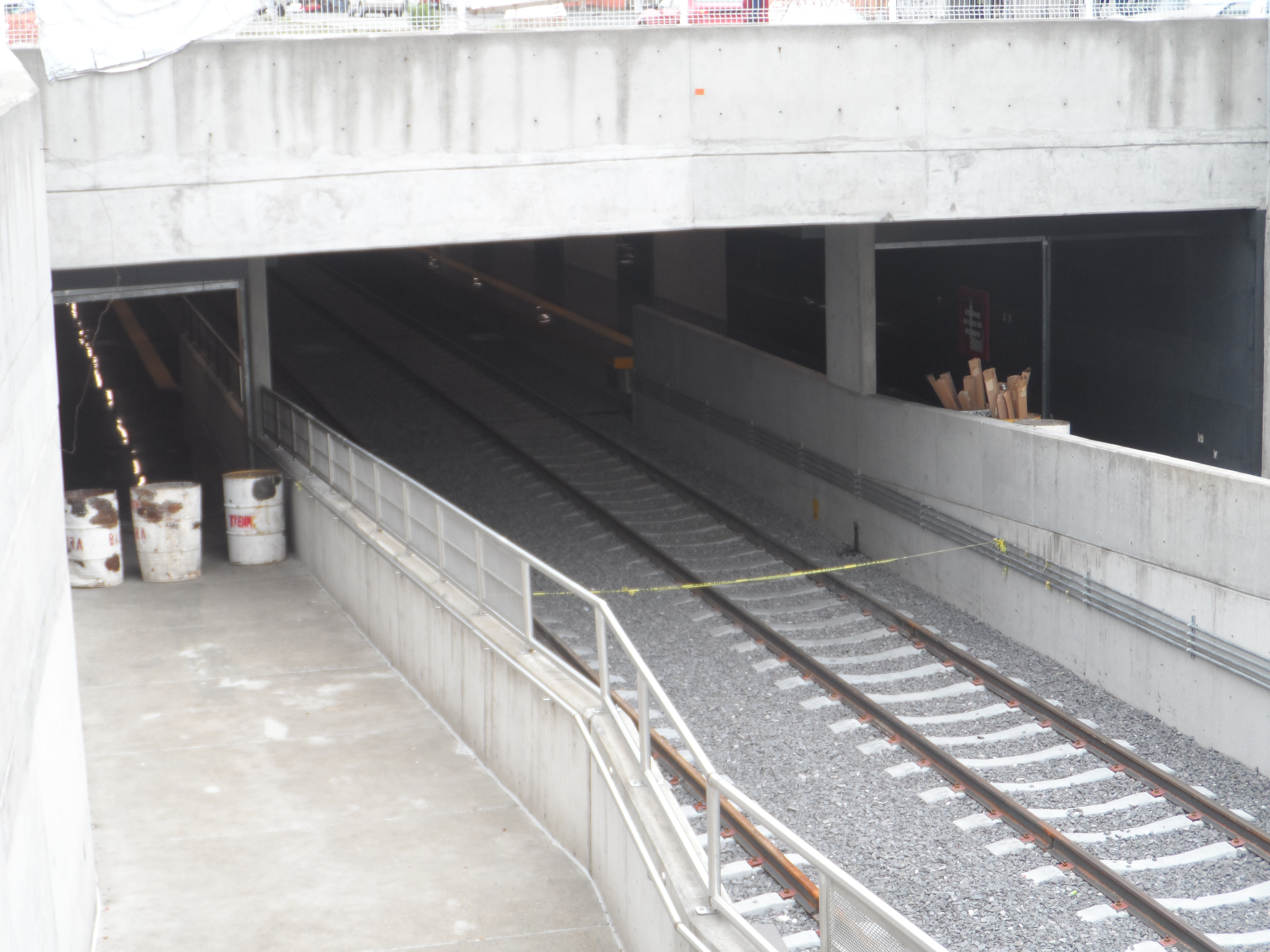
Auditorio station as of August 14, 2017.

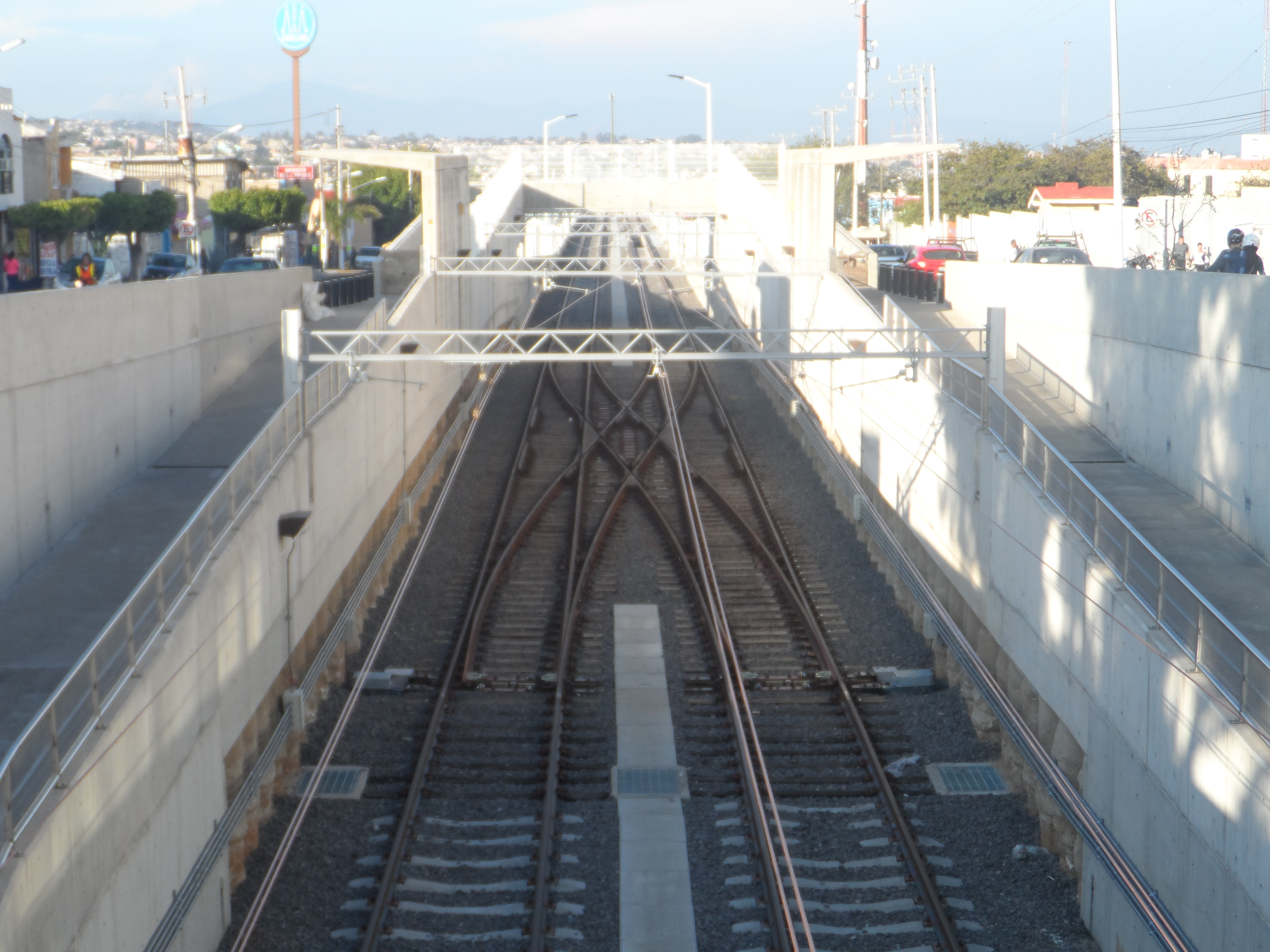
The north parking of Line 1, next to the Auditorio railway station.

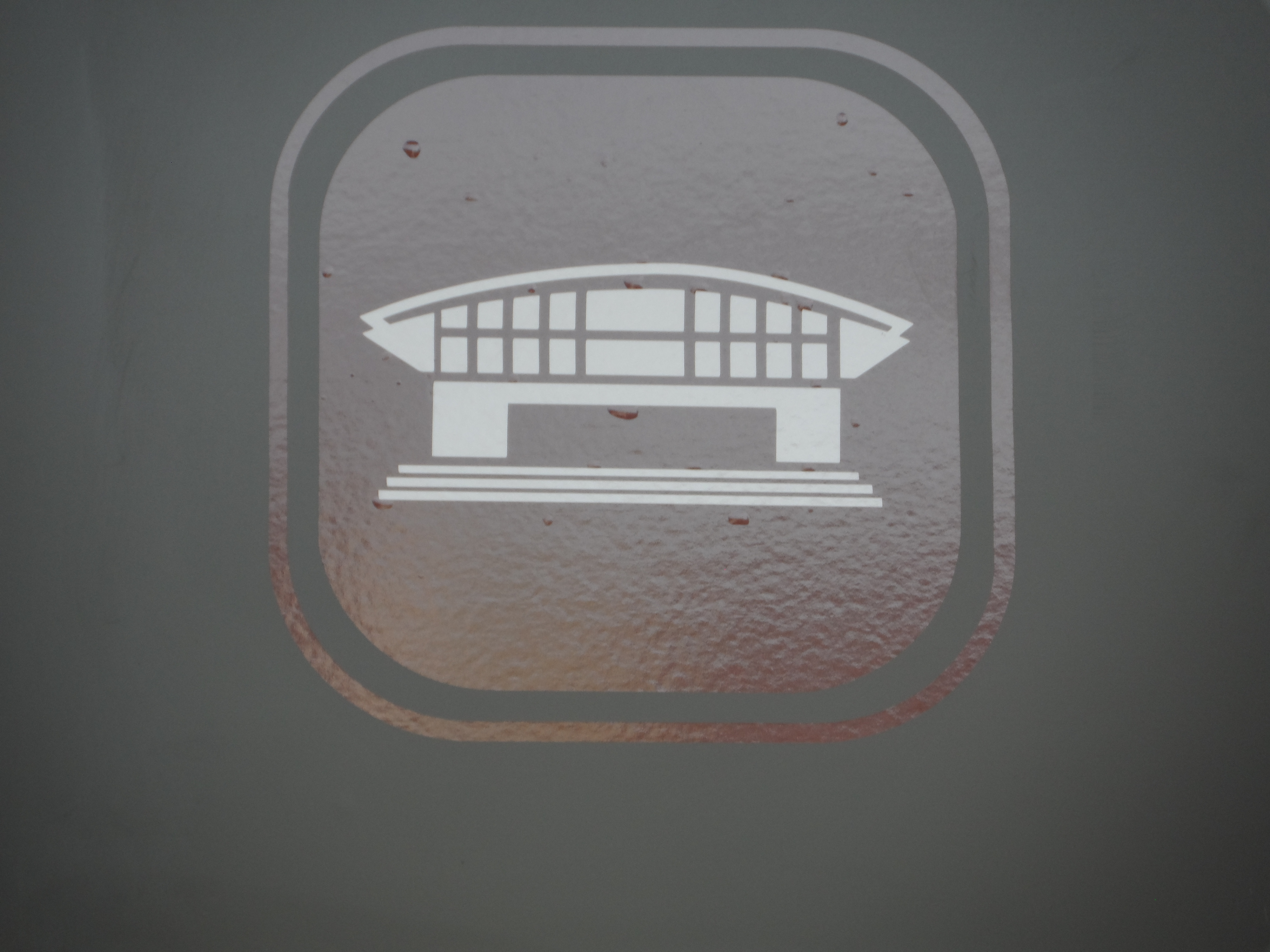
Logotype of the Auditorio railway station.
