= Trade =

Exchange of goods and services

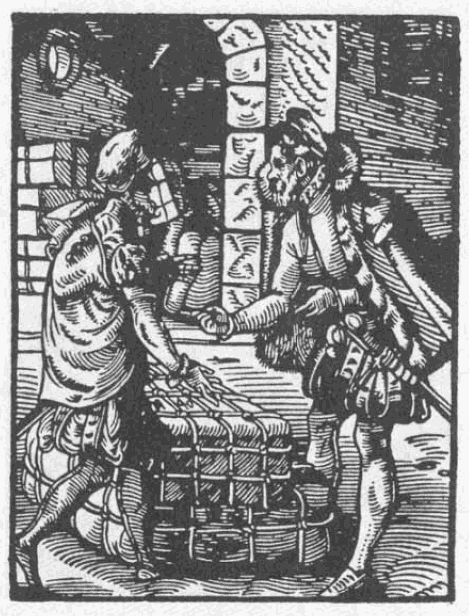
Two traders in 16th-century Germany

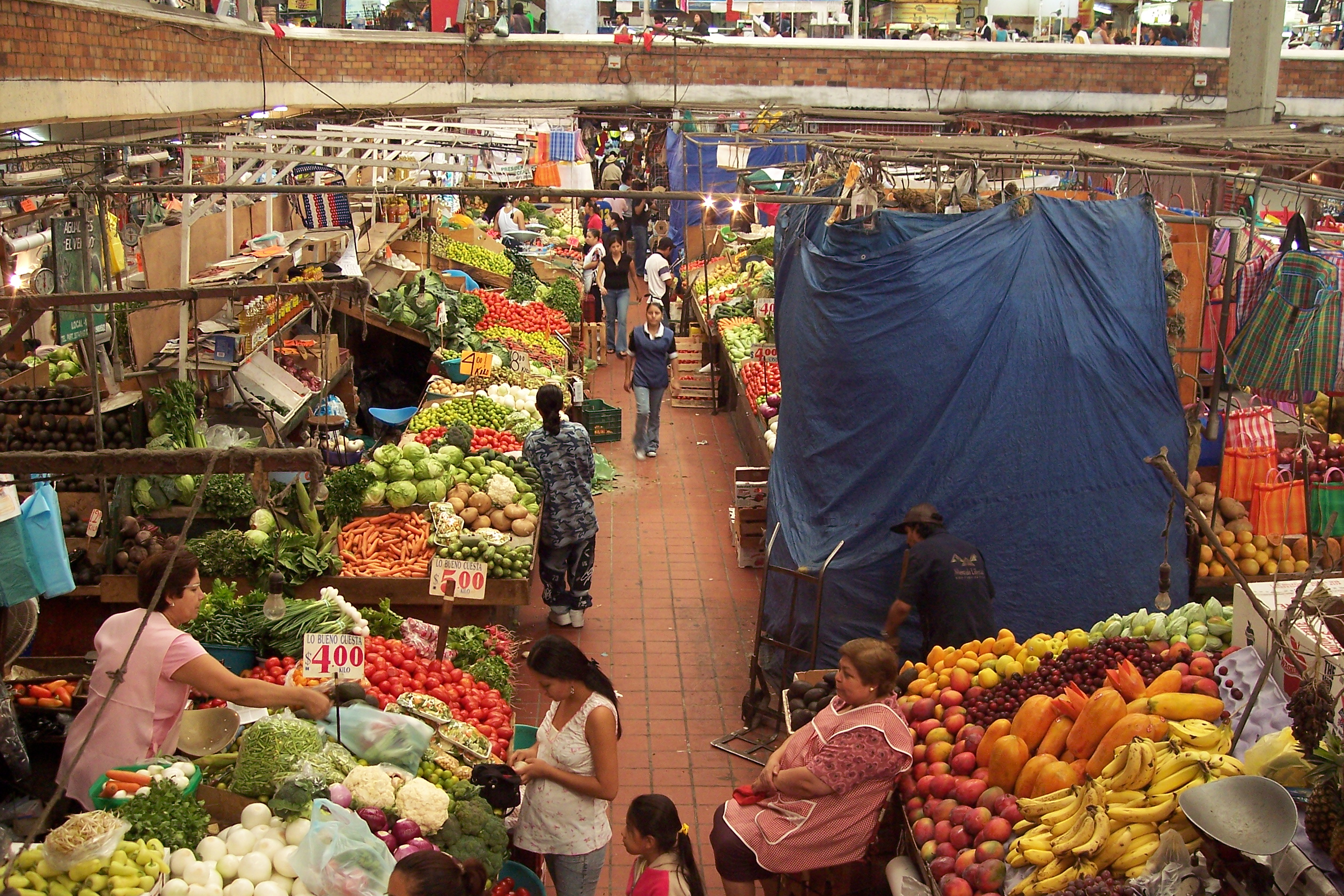
The San Juan de Dios Market in Guadalajara, Jalisco, Mexico

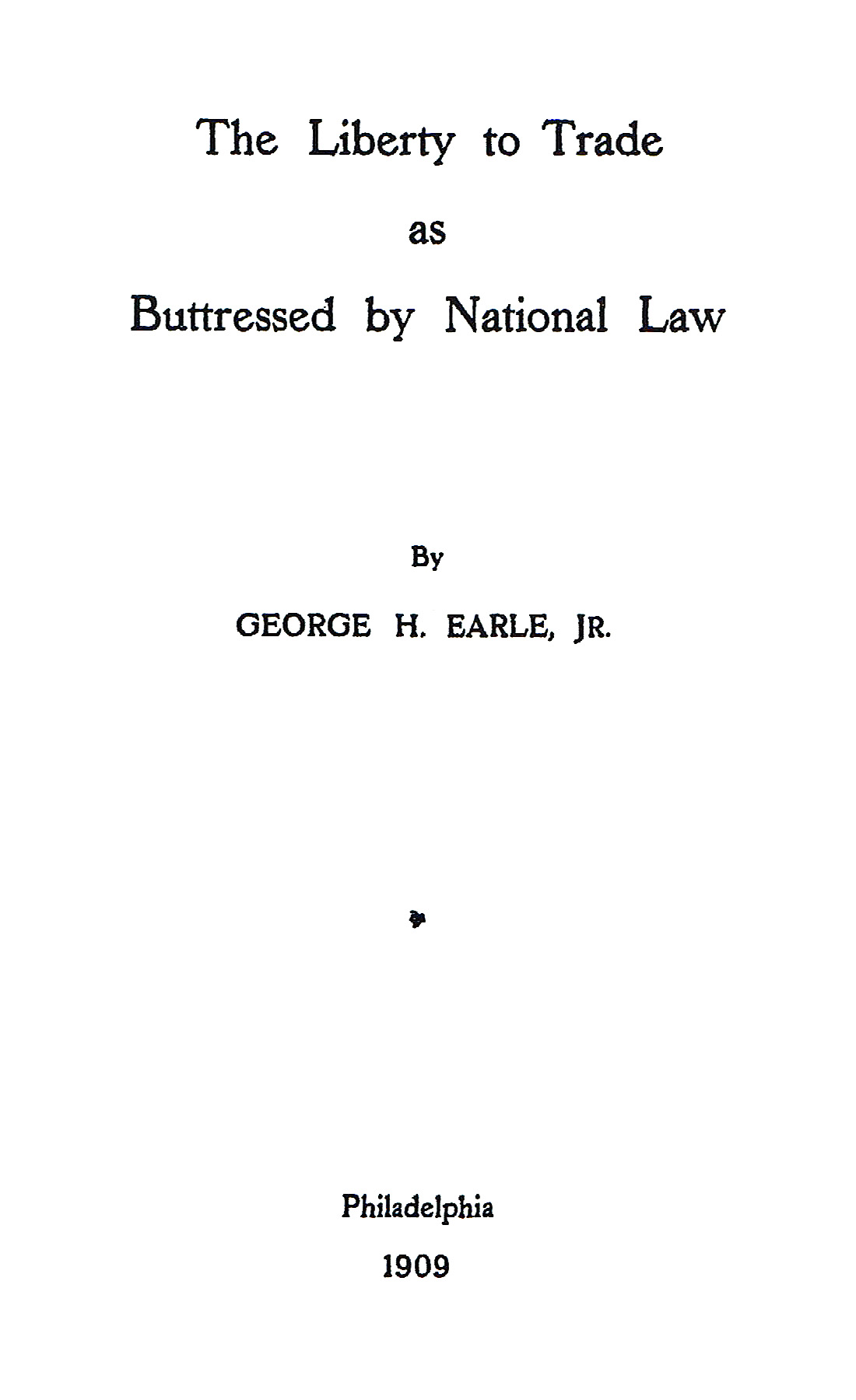
The Liberty to Trade as Buttressed by National Law (1909) by George Howard Earle, Jr.

Trade is the act by which people take something of value (such as products, resources, money) in exchange for something they give in value. It is pre-agreed upon and is considered a 'contract'. Lacking this, it is theft.

"Trade" involves the transfer of goods and services from one person or entity (seller) to another (buyer), in exchange for money for the person the goods or services were obtained from.

In one modern view, trade exists due to specialization and the division of labour, a predominant form of economic activity in which individuals and groups concentrate on a small aspect of production, but use their output in trade for other products and needs. Trade exists between regions because different regions may have a comparative advantage (perceived or real) in the production of some trade-able goods – including the production of scarce or limited natural resources elsewhere. For example, different regions' sizes may encourage mass production. In such circumstances, trading at market price between locations can benefit both locations. Different types of traders may specialize in trading different kinds of goods; for example, the spice trade and grain trade have both historically been important in the development of a global, international economy. Retail trade consists of the sale of goods or merchandise from a fixed location, online or by mail, in small or individual lots for direct consumption or use by the purchaser.

Historically, openness to free trade has substantially increased in some areas from 1815 until the outbreak of World War I in 1914. Trade openness increased again during the 1920s but collapsed (in particular in Europe and North America) during the Great Depression of the 1930s. Trade openness increased substantially again from the 1950s onward (albeit with a slowdown during the oil crisis of the 1970s). Economists and economic historians contend that current levels of trade openness are the highest they have ever been.

== Etymology ==
Trade is from Middle English trade ("path, course of conduct"), introduced into English by Hanseatic merchants, from Middle Low German trade ("track, course"), from Old Saxon trada ("spoor, track"), from Proto-Germanic *tradō ("track, way"), and cognate with Old English tredan ("to tread").

Commerce is derived from the Latin commercium, from cum "together" and merx, "merchandise."

== History ==
=== Prehistory ===
Trade originated from human communication in prehistoric times. Prehistoric peoples exchanged goods and services with each other in a gift economy before the innovation of modern-day currency. Recent research finds evidence that early humans developed trade networks for obsidian 15,000 years ago as well as ostrich egg shell beads 50,000 years ago.

In the Mediterranean region, the earliest contact between cultures involved members of the species Homo sapiens, principally using the Danube river, at a time beginning 35,000–30,000 BP.

The caduceus, traditionally associated with Mercury (the Roman patron-god of merchants), continues in use as a symbol of commerce.

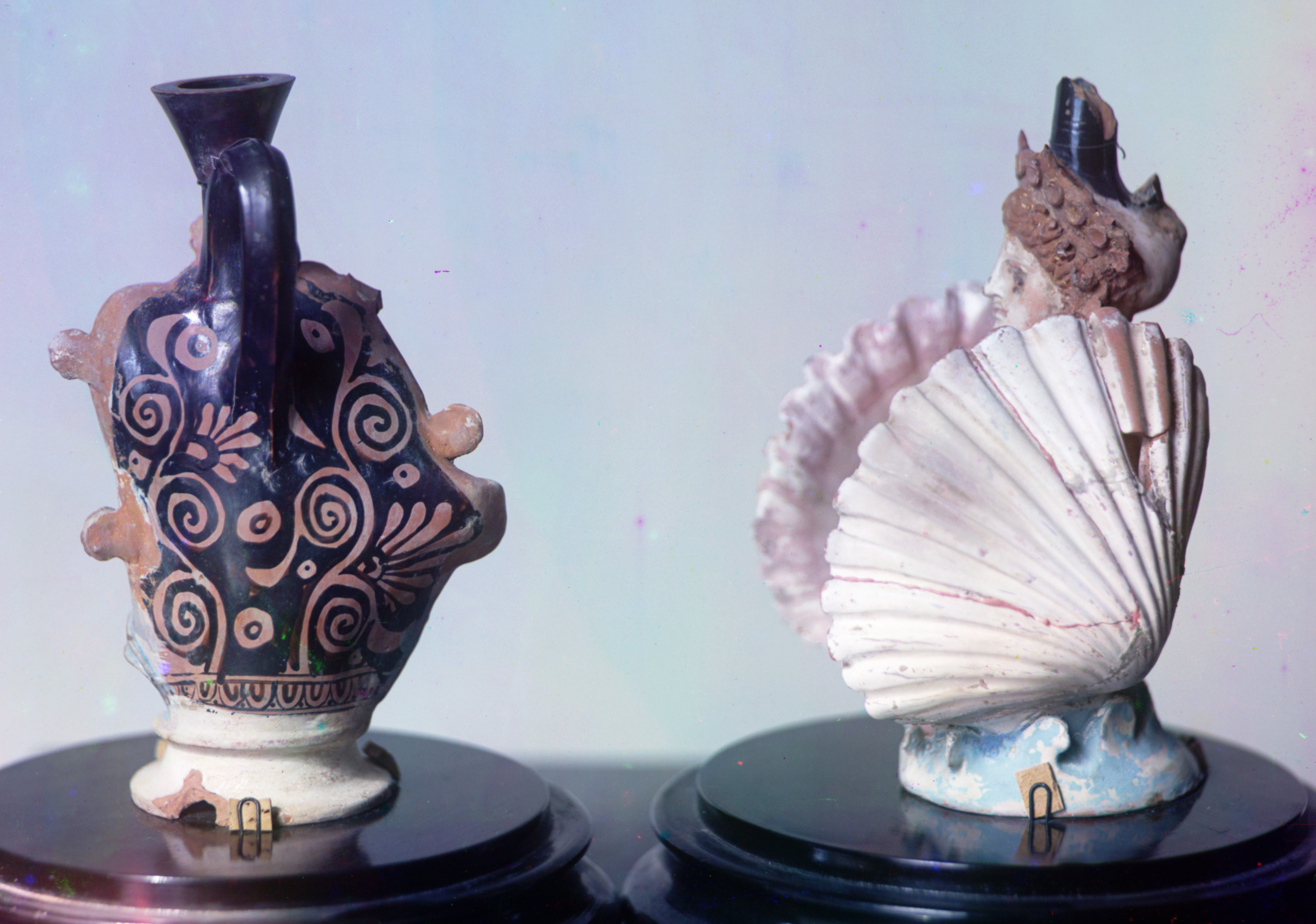
Ancient Etruscan "aryballoi" terracota vessels unearthed in the 1860s at Bolshaya Bliznitsa tumulus near Phanagoria, South Russia (formerly part of the Bosporan Kingdom of Cimmerian Bosporus, present-day Taman Peninsula); on exhibit at the Hermitage Museum in Saint Petersburg

There is evidence of the exchange of obsidian and flint during the Stone Age. Trade in obsidian is believed to have taken place in New Guinea from 17,000 BCE.

The earliest use of obsidian in the Near East dates to the Lower and Middle paleolithic.

— HIH Prince Mikasa no Miya Takahito

Robert Carr Bosanquet investigated trade in the Stone Age by excavations in 1901. The first clear archaeological evidence of trade in manufactured goods is found in south west Asia.

Archaeological evidence of obsidian use provides data on how this material was increasingly the preferred choice rather than chert from the late Mesolithic to Neolithic, requiring exchange as deposits of obsidian are rare in the Mediterranean region.

Obsidian provided the material to make cutting utensils or tools, although since other more easily obtainable materials were available, use was exclusive to the higher status of the tribe using "the rich man's flint". Obsidian has held its value relative to flint.

Early traders traded Obsidian at distances of 900 kilometres within the Mediterranean region.

Trade in the Mediterranean during the Neolithic of Europe was greatest in this material. Networks were in existence at around 12,000 BCE Anatolia was the source primarily for trade with the Levant, Iran and Egypt according to Zarins study of 1990. Melos and Lipari sources produced among the most widespread trading in the Mediterranean region as known to archaeology.

The Sari-i-Sang mine in the mountains of Afghanistan was the largest source for trade of lapis lazuli. The material was most largely traded during the Kassite period of Babylonia beginning 1595 BCE.

=== Ancient history ===
==== Mediterranean and Near East ====
Ebla was a prominent trading-center during the third millennium BCE, with a network reaching into Anatolia and north Mesopotamia.

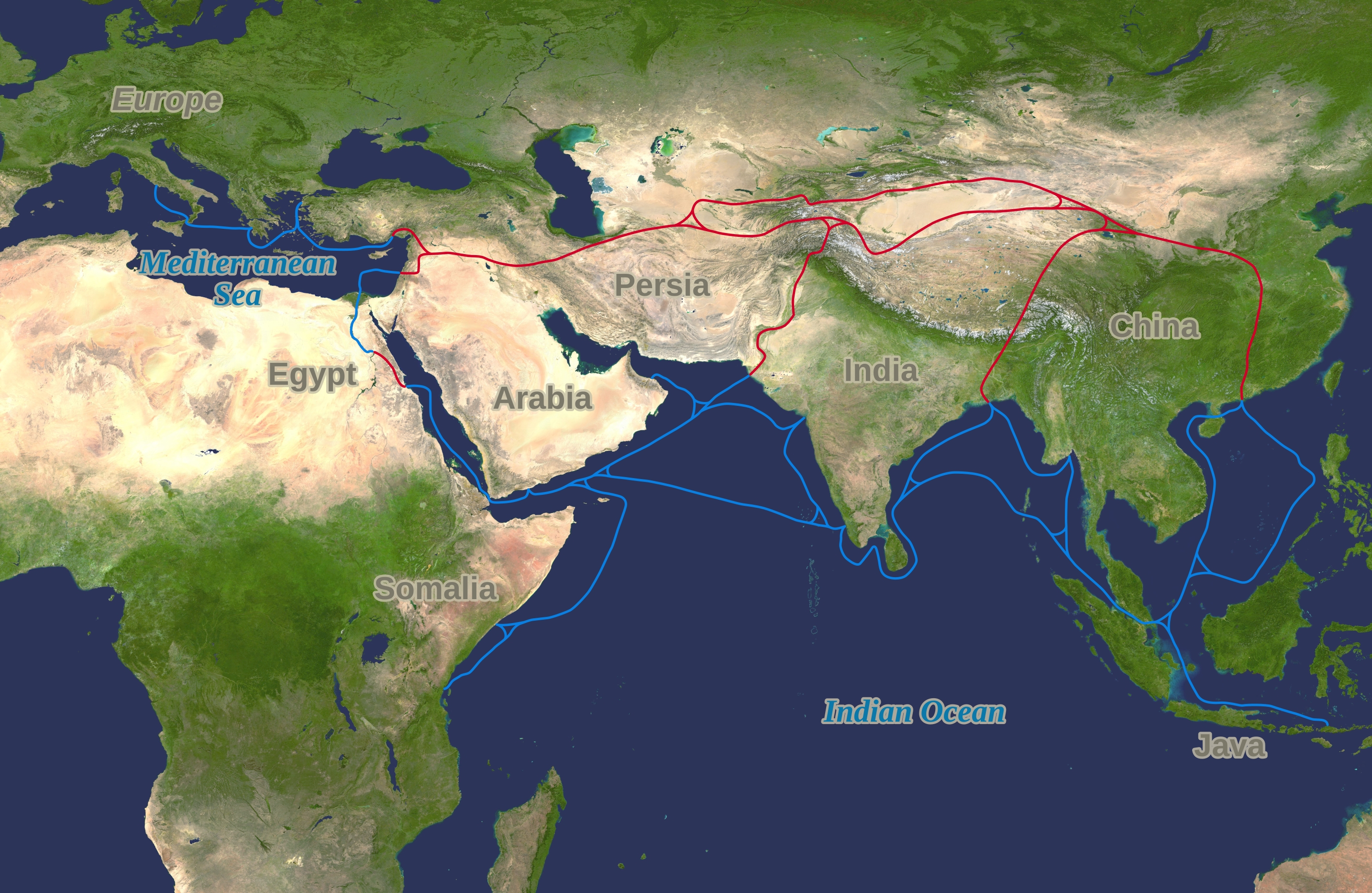
A map of the Silk Road trade route between Europe and Asia

Materials used for making jewelry were traded with Egypt from 3000 BCE. Long-range trade routes first appeared in the 3rd millennium BCE, when Sumerians in Mesopotamia traded with the Harappan civilization of the Indus Valley. The Phoenicians were noted maritime traders, traveling across the Mediterranean Sea and as far north as Britain for sources of tin to manufacture bronze. For this purpose they established trading colonies — which the Greeks called emporia. Along the coasts of the Mediterranean, researchers have found a positive relationship between how well-connected a coastal location was and the local prevalence of archaeological sites from the Iron Age. This suggests that a location's trade potential was an important determinant of human settlements.

From the beginning of Greek civilization until the fall of the Roman Empire in the 5th century CE, a financially lucrative trade brought valuable spice to Europe from the far east, including India and China. Roman commerce allowed its empire to flourish and endure, notable by importing grain to Italy from Sicily and from Egypt. The latter Roman Republic and the Pax Romana of the Roman empire produced a stable and secure transportation-network that enabled the shipment of trade goods without fear of significant piracy, as Rome had become the sole effective sea-power in the Mediterranean with the conquest of Egypt and the near east.

In ancient Greece Hermes was the god of trade (commerce) and weights and measures. In ancient Rome, Mercurius was the god of merchants, whose festival was celebrated by traders on the 25th day of the fifth month. The concept of free trade was an antithesis to the will and economic direction of the sovereigns of the ancient Greek states. Free trade between states was stifled by the need for strict internal controls (via taxation) to maintain security within the treasury of the sovereign, which nevertheless enabled the maintenance of a modicum of civility within the structures of functional community life.

The fall of the Roman empire and the succeeding Dark Ages brought instability to Western Europe and a near-collapse of the trade network in the western world. Trade, however, continued to flourish among the kingdoms of Africa, the Middle East, India, China, and Southeast Asia. Some trade did occur in the west. For instance, Radhanites were a medieval guild or group (the precise meaning of the word is lost to history) of Jewish merchants who traded between the Christians in Europe and the Muslims of the Near East.

==== Indo-Pacific ====
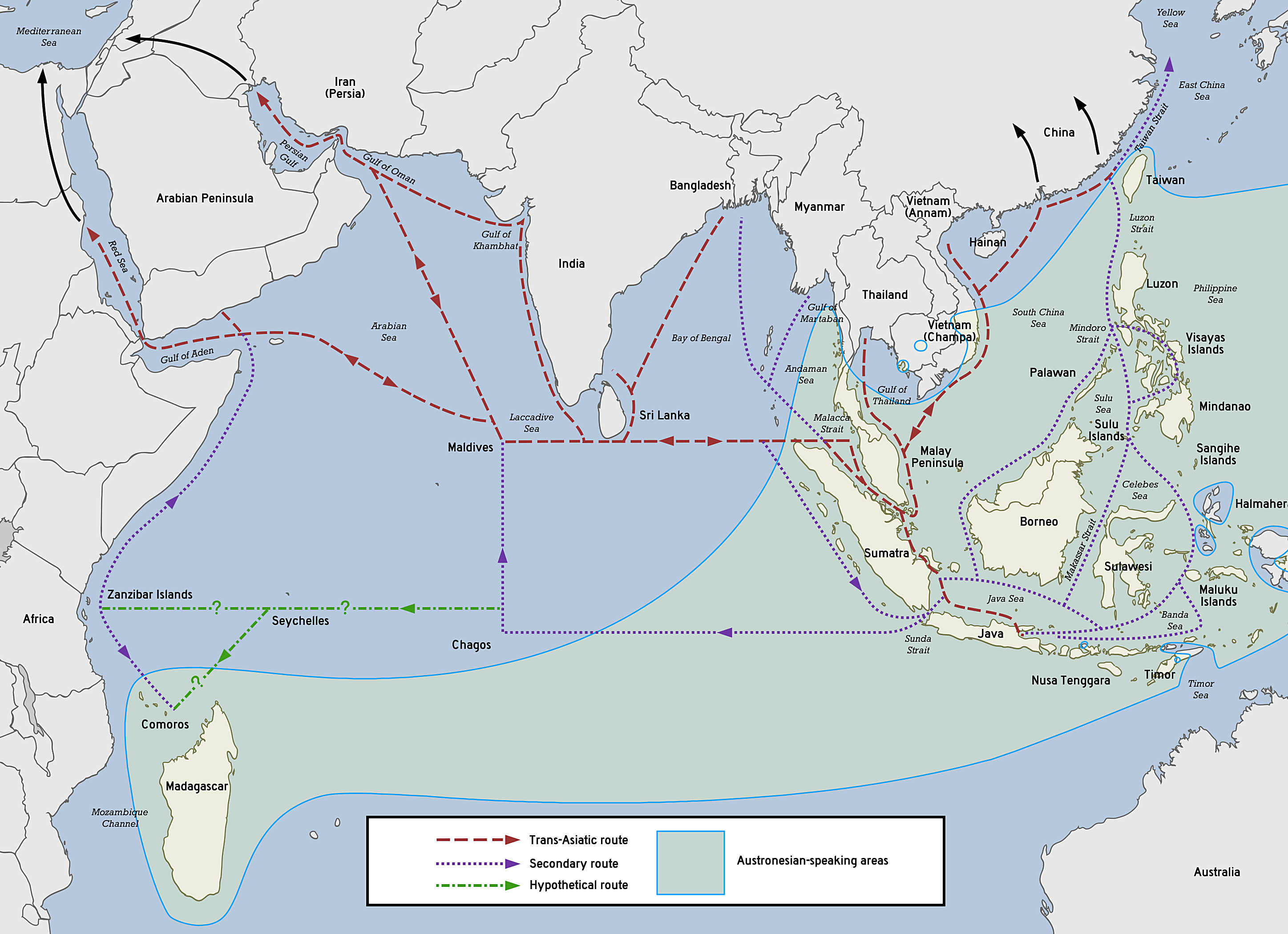
Austronesian proto-historic and historic maritime trade network in the Indian Ocean

The first true maritime trade network in the Indian Ocean was by the Austronesian peoples of Island Southeast Asia. Initiated by the indigenous peoples of Taiwan and the Philippines, the Maritime Jade Road was an extensive trading network connecting multiple areas in Southeast and East Asia. Its primary products were made of jade mined from Taiwan by Taiwanese indigenous peoples and processed mostly in the Philippines by indigenous Filipinos, especially in Batanes, Luzon, and Palawan. Some were also processed in Vietnam, while the peoples of Malaysia, Brunei, Singapore, Thailand, Indonesia, and Cambodia also participated in the massive trading network. The maritime road is one of the most extensive sea-based trade networks of a single geological material in the prehistoric world. It was in existence for at least 3,000 years, where its peak production was from 2000 BCE to 500 CE, older than the Silk Road in mainland Eurasia and the later Maritime Silk Road. The Maritime Jade Road began to wane during its final centuries from 500 CE until 1000 CE. The entire period of the network was a golden age for the diverse societies of the region.

Sea-faring Southeast Asians also established trade routes with Southern India and Sri Lanka as early as 1500 BC, ushering an exchange of material culture (like catamarans, outrigger boats, sewn-plank boats, and paan) and cultigens (like coconuts, sandalwood, bananas, and sugarcane); as well as connecting the material cultures of India and China. Indonesians, in particular were trading in spices (mainly cinnamon and cassia) with East Africa using catamaran and outrigger boats and sailing with the help of the Westerlies in the Indian Ocean. This trade network expanded to reach as far as Africa and the Arabian Peninsula, resulting in the Austronesian colonization of Madagascar by the first half of the first millennium AD. It continued up to historic times, later becoming the Maritime Silk Road.

==== Mesoamerica ====
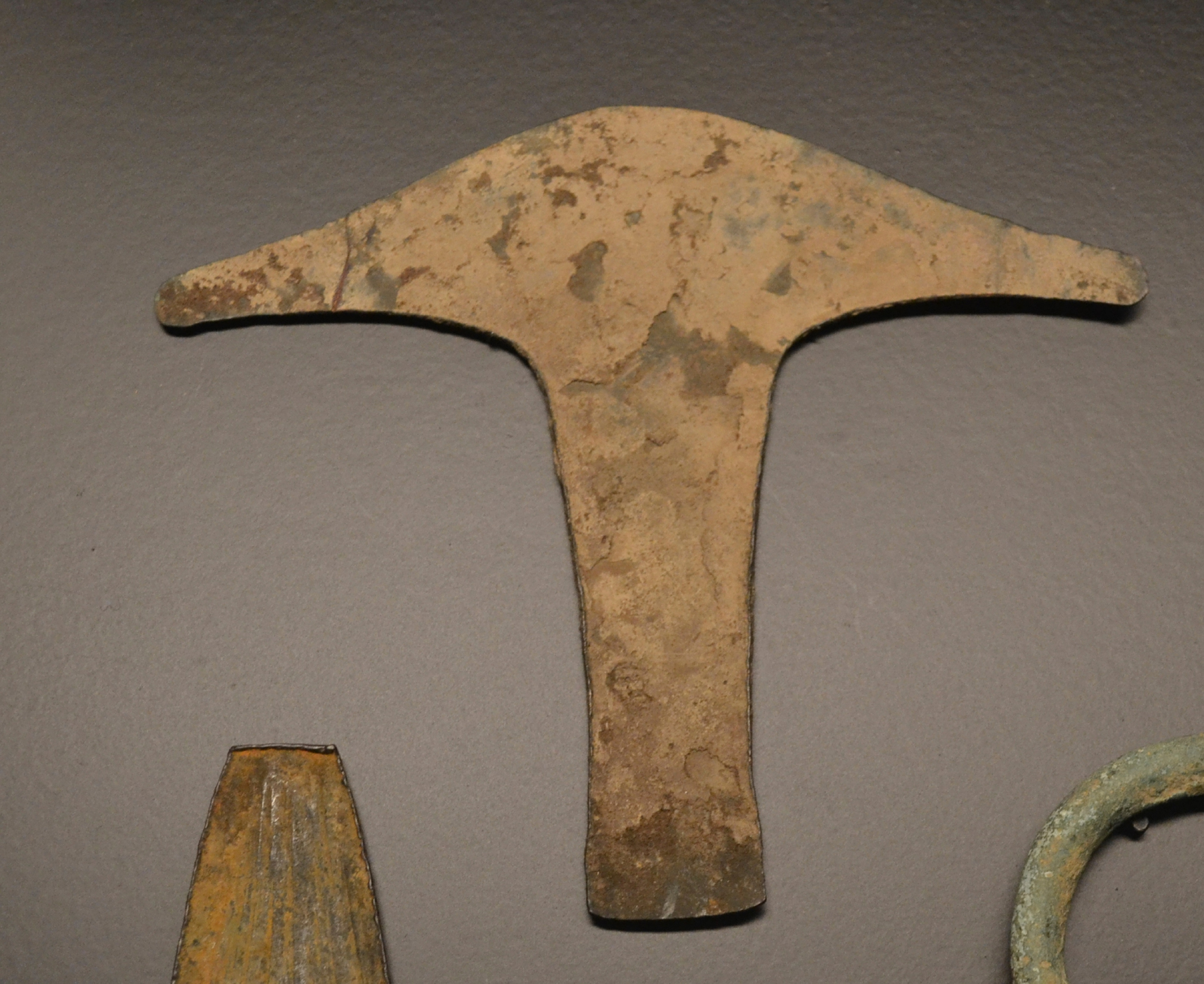
Tajadero or axe money used as currency in Mesoamerica. It had a fixed worth of 8,000 cacao seeds, which were also used as currency.

The emergence of exchange networks in the Pre-Columbian societies of and near to Mexico are known to have occurred within recent years before and after 1500 BCE.

Trade networks reached north to Oasisamerica. There is evidence of established maritime trade with the cultures of northwestern South America and the Caribbean.

=== Middle Ages ===
Western Europe established a complex and expansive trade network with cargo ships being the main carrier of goods; cogs and hulks are two examples of such cargo ships. Many ports would develop their own extensive trade networks. The English port city of Bristol traded with peoples from Iceland, all along the western coast of France, and south to present-day Spain.

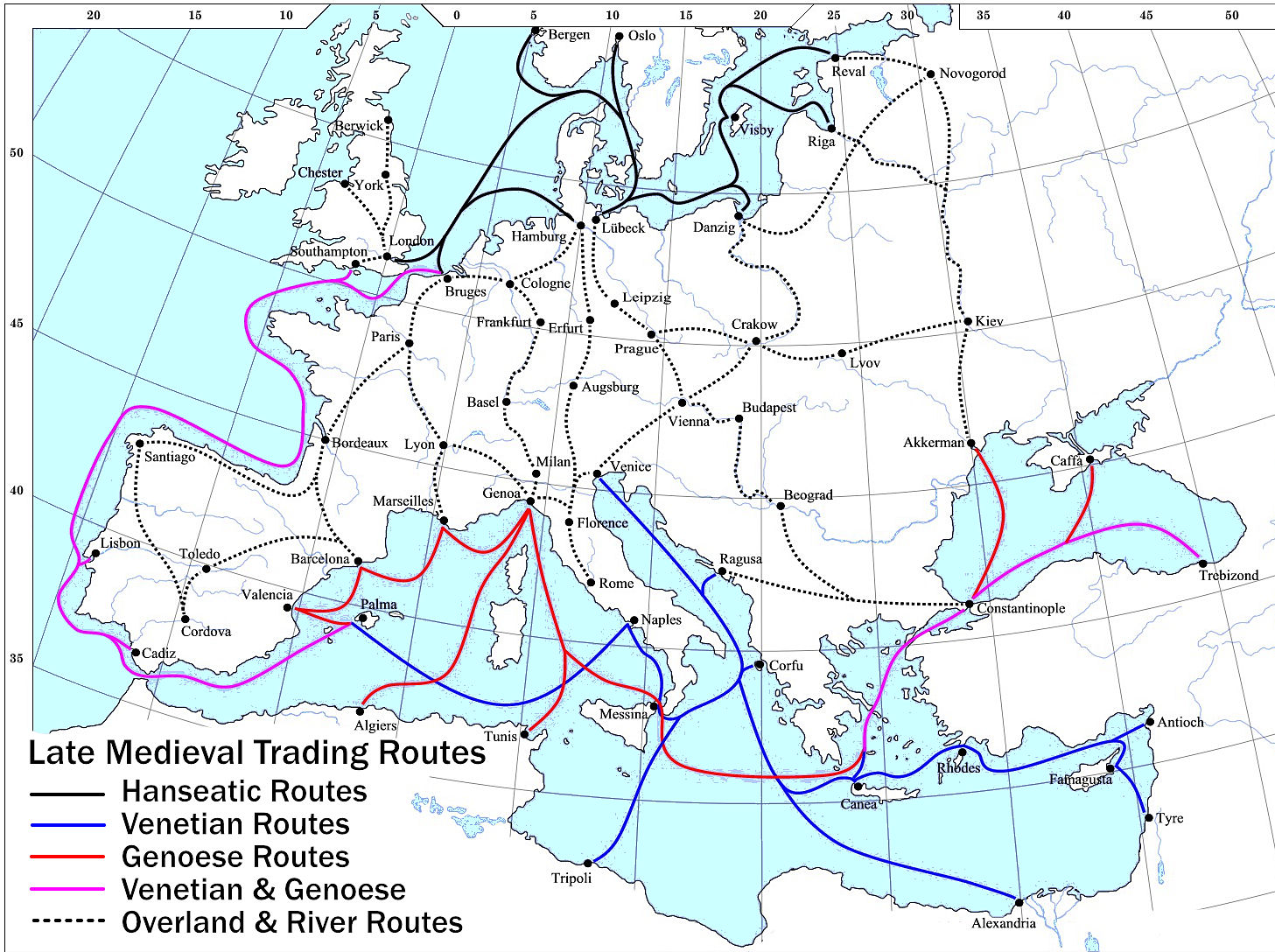
A map showing the main trade routes for goods within late-medieval Europe

During the Middle Ages, Central Asia was the economic center of the world.

From the Middle Ages, the maritime republics, in particular Venice, Pisa and Genoa, played a key role in trade in the Mediterranean. From the 11th to the late-15th centuries, the Venetian Republic and the Republic of Genoa were major trade-centers. They dominated trade in the Mediterranean and the Black Sea, maintaining a trading monopoly between Europe and the Near East for centuries.

=== The Age of Sail and the Industrial Revolution ===
From 1070 onward, kingdoms in West Africa became significant members of global trade. This came initially through the movement of gold and other resources sent out by Muslim traders on the Trans-Saharan trading network. Beginning in the 16th century, European merchants would purchase gold, spices, cloth, timber and slaves from West African states as part of the triangular trade. This was often in exchange for cloth, iron, or cowrie shells which were used locally as currency.

Founded in 1352, the Bengal Sultanate was a major trading nation in the world and often referred to by Europeans as the wealthiest country with which to trade.

In the 16th and 17th centuries, the Portuguese gained an economic advantage in the Kingdom of Kongo due to different philosophies of trade. Whereas Portuguese traders concentrated on the accumulation of capital, in Kongo spiritual meaning was attached to many objects of trade. According to economic historian Toby Green, in Kongo "giving more than receiving was a symbol of spiritual and political power and privilege."

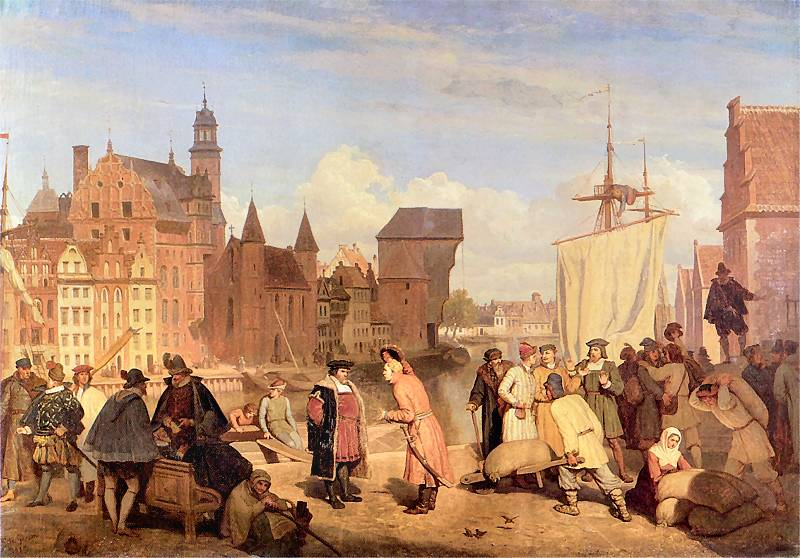
Danzig in the 17th century, a port of the Hanseatic League

=== 19th century ===
John Stuart Mill proved that a country with monopoly pricing power on the international market could manipulate the terms of trade through maintaining tariffs, and that the response to this might be reciprocity in trade policy. Ricardo and others had suggested this earlier. This was taken as evidence against the universal doctrine of free trade, as it was believed that more of the economic surplus of trade would accrue to a country following reciprocal, rather than completely free, trade policies. This was followed within a few years by the infant industry scenario developed by Mill promoting the theory that the government had the duty to protect young industries, although only for a time necessary for them to develop full capacity. This became the policy in many countries attempting to industrialize and out-compete English exporters. Milton Friedman later continued this vein of thought, showing that in a few circumstances tariffs might be beneficial to the host country; but never for the world at large.

=== 20th century ===
The lack of free trade was considered by many as a principal cause of the depression causing stagnation and inflation. Only during World War II did the recession end in the United States. Also during the war, in 1944, 44 countries signed the Bretton Woods Agreement, intended to prevent national trade barriers, to avoid depressions. It set up rules and institutions to regulate the international political economy: the International Monetary Fund and the International Bank for Reconstruction and Development (later divided into the World Bank $ Bank for International Settlements). These organizations became operational in 1946 after enough countries ratified the agreement. In 1947, 23 countries agreed to the General Agreement on Tariffs and Trade to promote free trade.

The European Union became the world's largest exporter of manufactured goods and services, the biggest export market for around 80 countries.

=== 21st century ===
Today, trade is merely a subset within a complex system of companies which try to maximize their profits by offering products and services to the market (which consists both of individuals and other companies) at the lowest production cost. A system of international trade has helped to develop the world economy but, in combination with bilateral or multilateral agreements to lower tariffs or to achieve free trade, has sometimes harmed third-world markets for local products.

=== Free trade ===
Free trade is a policy by which a government does not discriminate against imports or exports by applying tariffs or subsidies. This policy is also known as laissez-faire policy. This kind of policy does not necessarily imply a country will then abandon all control and taxation of imports and exports.

Free trade advanced further in the late 20th century and early 2000s:

- 1992 European Union lifted barriers to internal trade in goods and labour.
- 1 January 1994 the North American Free Trade Agreement (NAFTA) took effect.
- 1994 The GATT Marrakech Agreement specified formation of the WTO.
- 1 January 1995 World Trade Organization was created to facilitate free trade, by mandating mutual most favored nation trading status between all signatories.
- EC was transformed into the European Union, which accomplished the Economic and Monetary Union (EMU) in 2002, through introducing the Euro, and creating this way a real single market between 13 member states as of 1 January 2007.
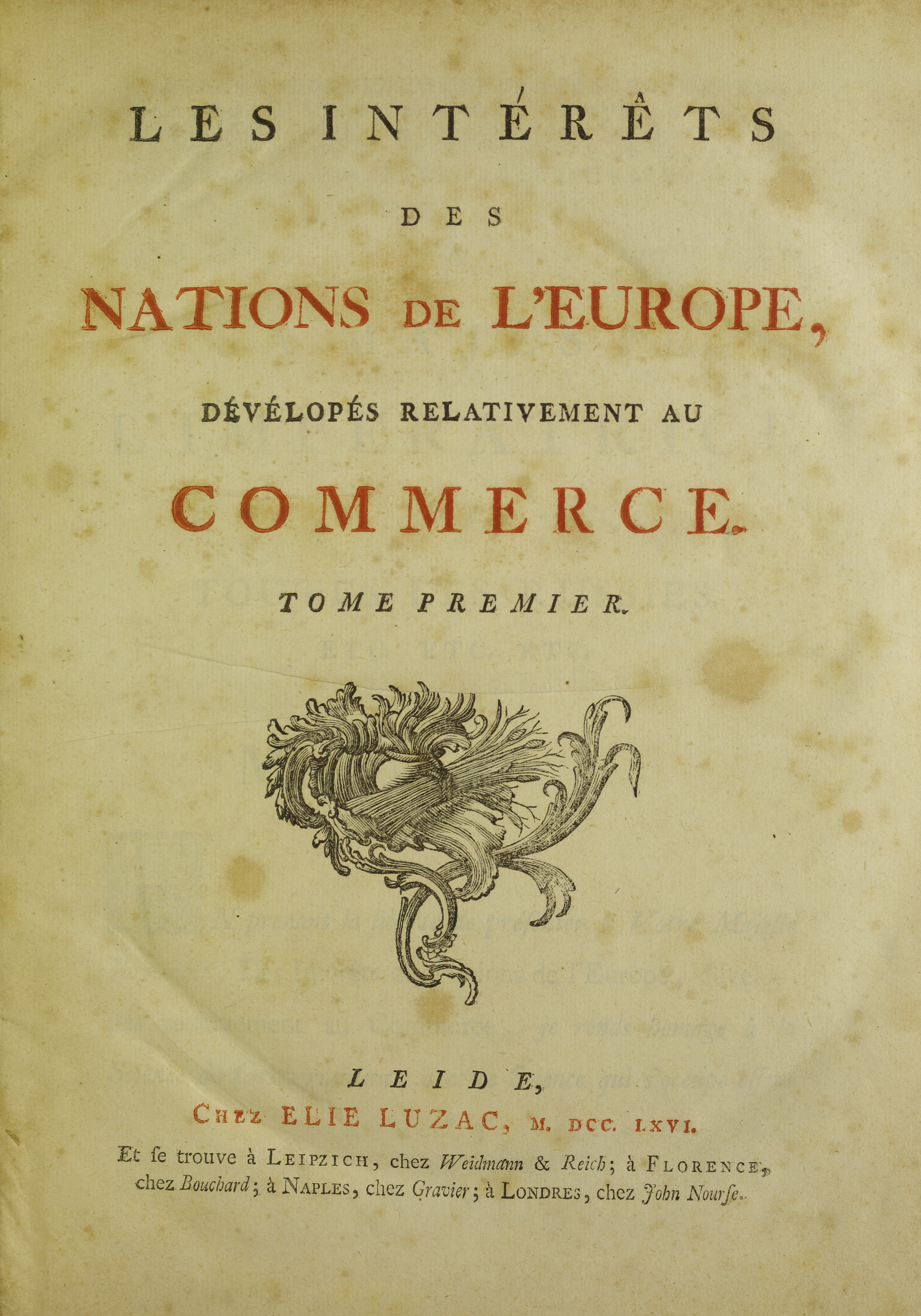
- Intérêts des nations de l'Europe, dévélopés relativement au commerce (1766)
  2005, the Central American Free Trade Agreement was signed; It includes the United States and the Dominican Republic.

== Perspectives ==
=== Protectionism ===
Protectionism is the policy of restraining and discouraging trade between states and contrasts with the policy of free trade. This policy often takes the form of tariffs and restrictive quotas. Protectionist policies were particularly prevalent in the 1930s, between the Great Depression and the onset of World War II.

=== Religion ===
Islamic teachings encourage trading.

Judeao-Christian teachings do not prohibit trade. They do prohibit fraud and dishonest measures.

=== Development of money ===
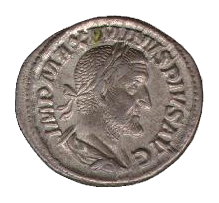
A Roman denarius

The first instances of money were objects with intrinsic value. This is called commodity money and includes any commonly available commodity that has intrinsic value; historical examples include pigs, rare seashells, whale's teeth, and (often) cattle. In medieval Iraq, bread was used as an early form of money. In the Aztec Empire, under the rule of Montezuma cocoa beans became legitimate currency.

Currency was introduced as standardised money to facilitate a wider exchange of goods and services. This first stage of currency, where metals were used to represent stored value, and symbols to represent commodities, formed the basis of trade in the Fertile Crescent for over 1500 years.

Numismatists have examples of coins from the earliest large-scale societies, although these were initially unmarked lumps of precious metal.

== Trends ==
=== Doha rounds ===
The Doha round of World Trade Organization negotiations aimed to lower barriers to trade around the world, with a focus on making trade more fair for developing countries. Talks have been hung over a divide between the rich developed countries, represented by the G20, and the major developing countries. Agricultural subsidies are the most significant issue upon which agreement has been the hardest to negotiate. By contrast, there was much agreement on trade facilitation and capacity building. The Doha round began in Doha, Qatar.

=== China ===
Beginning around 1978, the government of the People's Republic of China (PRC) began the reform and opening up. In contrast to the previous Soviet-style centrally planned economy, the new measures progressively relaxed restrictions on farming, agricultural distribution and, several years later, urban enterprises and labor. The more market-oriented approach reduced inefficiencies and stimulated private investment, particularly by farmers, which led to increased productivity and output. One feature was the establishment of four (later five) Special Economic Zones located along the South-east coast.

The reforms proved spectacularly successful in terms of increased output, variety, quality, price and demand. In real terms, the economy doubled in size between 1978 and 1986, doubled again by 1994, and again by 2003. On a real per capita basis, doubling from the 1978 base took place in 1987, 1996 and 2006. By 2008, the economy was 16.7 times the size it was in 1978, and 12.1 times its previous per capita levels. International trade progressed even more rapidly, doubling on average every 4.5 years. Total two-way trade in January 1998 exceeded that for all of 1978; in the first quarter of 2009, trade exceeded the full-year 1998 level. In 2008, China's two-way trade totaled US$2.56 trillion.

In 1991 China joined the Asia-Pacific Economic Cooperation group, a trade-promotion forum. In 2001, it also joined the World Trade Organization.

== International trade ==
Empirical evidence for the success of trade can be seen in the contrast between countries such as South Korea, which adopted a policy of export-oriented industrialization, and India, which historically had a more closed policy. South Korea has done much better by economic criteria than India over the past fifty years, though its success also has to do with effective state institutions.

=== Trade sanctions ===
Trade sanctions against a specific country are sometimes imposed, in order to punish that country for some action. An embargo, a severe form of externally imposed isolation, is a blockade of all trade by one country on another. For example, the United States has had an embargo against Cuba for over 60 years. Embargoes are usually on a temporary basis. For example, Armenia put a temporary embargo on Turkish products and bans any imports from Turkey on 31 December 2020. The situation is prompted by food security concerns given Turkey's hostile attitude towards Armenia.

=== Fair trade ===
The "fair trade" movement, also known as the "trade justice" movement, promotes the use of labour, environmental and social standards for the production of goods, particularly those exported from the Third and Second Worlds to the First World. Such ideas have also sparked a debate on whether trade itself should be codified as a human right.

Importing firms voluntarily adhere to fair trade standards or governments may enforce them through a combination of employment and commercial law. Proposed and practiced fair trade policies vary widely, ranging from the common prohibition of goods made using slave labour to minimum price support schemes such as those for coffee in the 1980s. Non-governmental organizations also play a role in promoting fair trade standards by serving as independent monitors of compliance with labeling requirements.

== See also ==
- Commerce
- Business
- Economics

== Bibliography ==
- Beckwith, Christopher I (2011) [2009]. Empires of the Silk Road: A History of Central Eurasia from the Bronze Age to the Present. Princeton: University Press. ISBN 978-0-691-15034-5.
- Bernstein, William J. (2008). A Splendid Exchange: How Trade Shaped the World. New York: Grove Press. ISBN 978-0-8021-4416-4.
- Davies, Glyn (2002) [1995]. Ideas: A History of Money from Ancient Times to the Present Day. Cardiff, Wales: University of Wales Press. ISBN 978-0-7083-1773-0. Archived from the original on 23 February 2007.
- Nomani, Farhad; Rahnema, Ali (1994). Islamic Economic Systems. New Jersey: Zed Books. ISBN 978-1-85649-058-0.
- Paine, Lincoln (2013). The Sea and Civilisation: a Maritime History of the World. Atlantic. (Covers sea-trading over the whole world from ancient times),
- Rössner, Philipp, Economy / Trade, EGO – European History Online, Mainz, Germany: Institute of European History, 2017, retrieved: 8 March 2021 (pdf).
- Watson, Peter (2005). Ideas: A History of Thought and Invention from Fire to Freud. New York: HarperCollins Publishers. ISBN 978-0-06-621064-3.
