= Mi Macro Calzada =

Bus route in Guadalajara, Mexico

Mi Macro Calzada

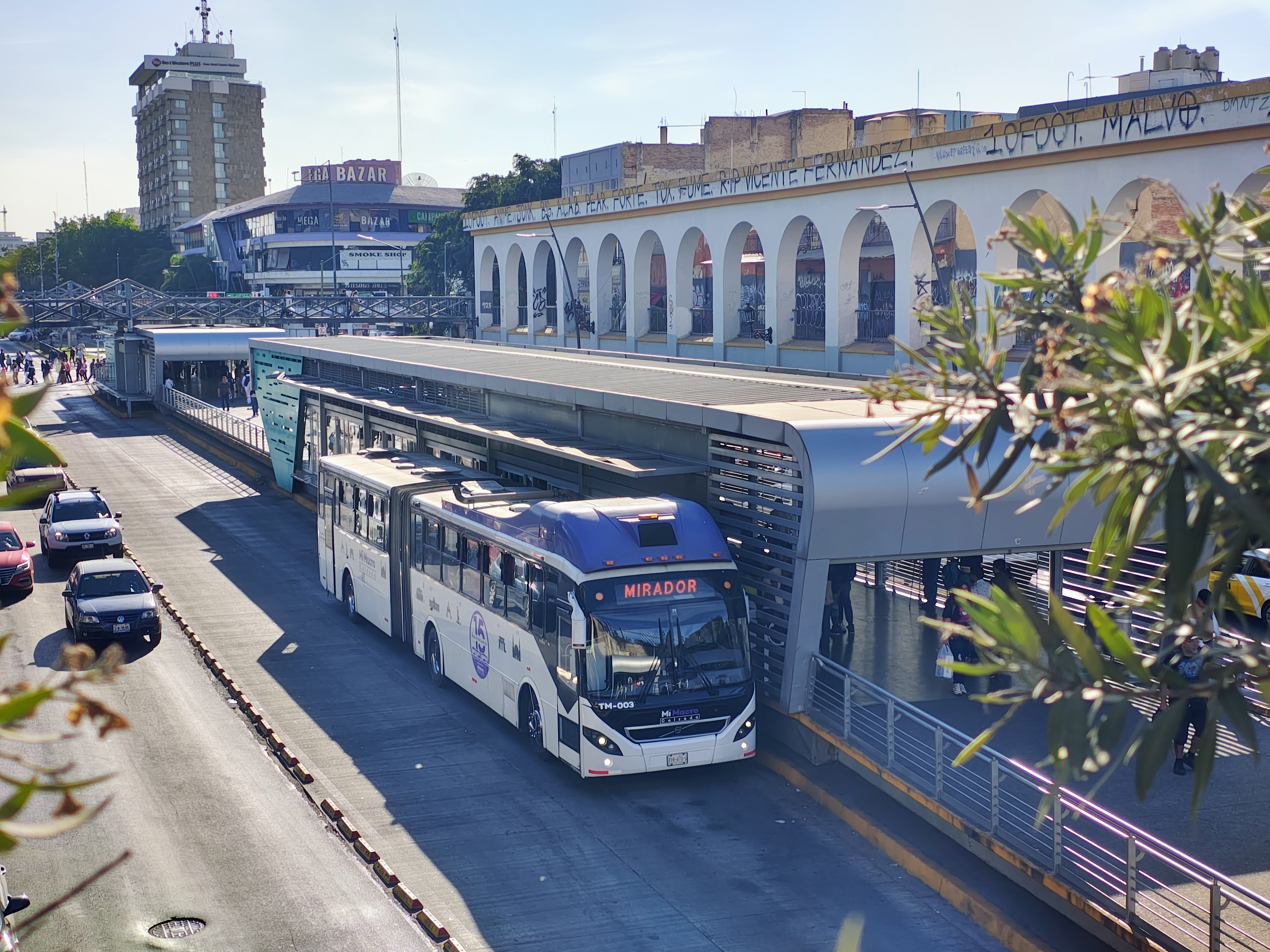

Overview
- Owner: Jalisco Government
- Area served: Guadalajara, Tlaquepaque and Zapopan
- Locale: Guadalajara
- Transit type: Bus rapid transit
- Line number: Parador, Express, 3 complementaries and 17 feeder routes
- Number of stations: 27
- Daily ridership: 132 000
- Website: Mi Macro (SITEUR)

Operation
- Began operation: March 10, 2009; 17 years ago
- Operators: Operadora Macrobús, Alianza de Camioneros de Jalisco A.C.
- Number of vehicles: 41 Volvo and 4 DINA
- Headway: 4 to 6 mins.

Technical
- System length: 16.6 kilometres (10.3 mi)
- Track gauge: 2.324 m
- Average speed: 55 km/h (34.18 mph)
- Top speed: 80 km/h (49.71 mph)
System map

Mi Macro Calzada is the first line of the Guadalajara Macrobús. It runs along 16.6 km (10.3 mi) on the Independencia roadway and the Gobernador Curiel Avenue from the southern terminus, Fray Angélico, north to Mirador, with a total of 27 stations. The line has connections with line 2 and line 3 of the light rail at the San Juan de Dios and Bicentenario stations, respectively, and with the second BRT line, Mi Macro Periférico, at the Independencia Norte station. In the near future, it will also have a connection with line 4 at the Fray Angélico station.

Its main stations, not including the terminals, are:

- San Juan de Dios, which has a connection with the line 2 of the light rail and with the Guadalajara trolleybus (line 3 of Sitren).
- Bicentenario, which has a connection with the Independencia station of the line 3 of the light rail.
- Independencia Norte, which has a connection with the second BRT line, Mi Macro Periférico.

== History ==
Construction of this line began in April 2008 and was completed in a record time of one year on March 10, 2009. With this, Guadalajara got its first BRT route, and it was the first in Mexico to implement passing lanes, as well as an Express service.

Starting February 25, 2012, televisors were installed on most units of the system. Between 2021 and 2022, the fleet of the line was entirely renewed.

== Fleet ==
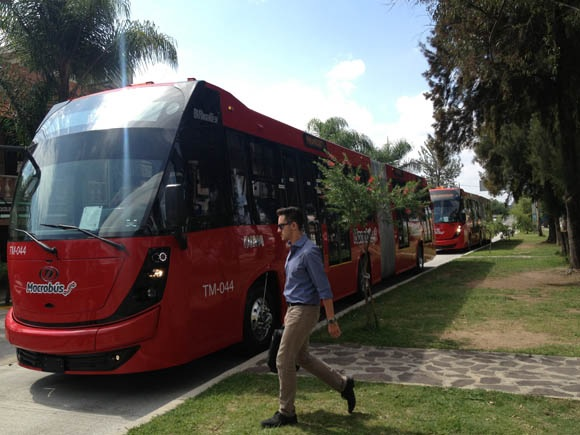
New units on the system.

The Mi Macro Calzada fleet is composed of high-floor articulated buses of the Volvo brand, very similar to those used by the Metrobús BRT system from Mexico City. Initially, the first line operated with 41 buses of the Volvo 7300BRT model. On September 17, 2014, four new units were acquired, this time the DINA Brighter model; these new units were red, taller, more silent, equipped with CCTV, and had a higher user capacity.

The Mi Macro Calzada fleet thus currently comprises 45 articulated buses.

Between 2021 and 2022 the units of the system were updated with a new "coat of paint" to blend with the new image of the Macrobús system, now simply known as "Mi Macro".

== Impact and number of passengers ==
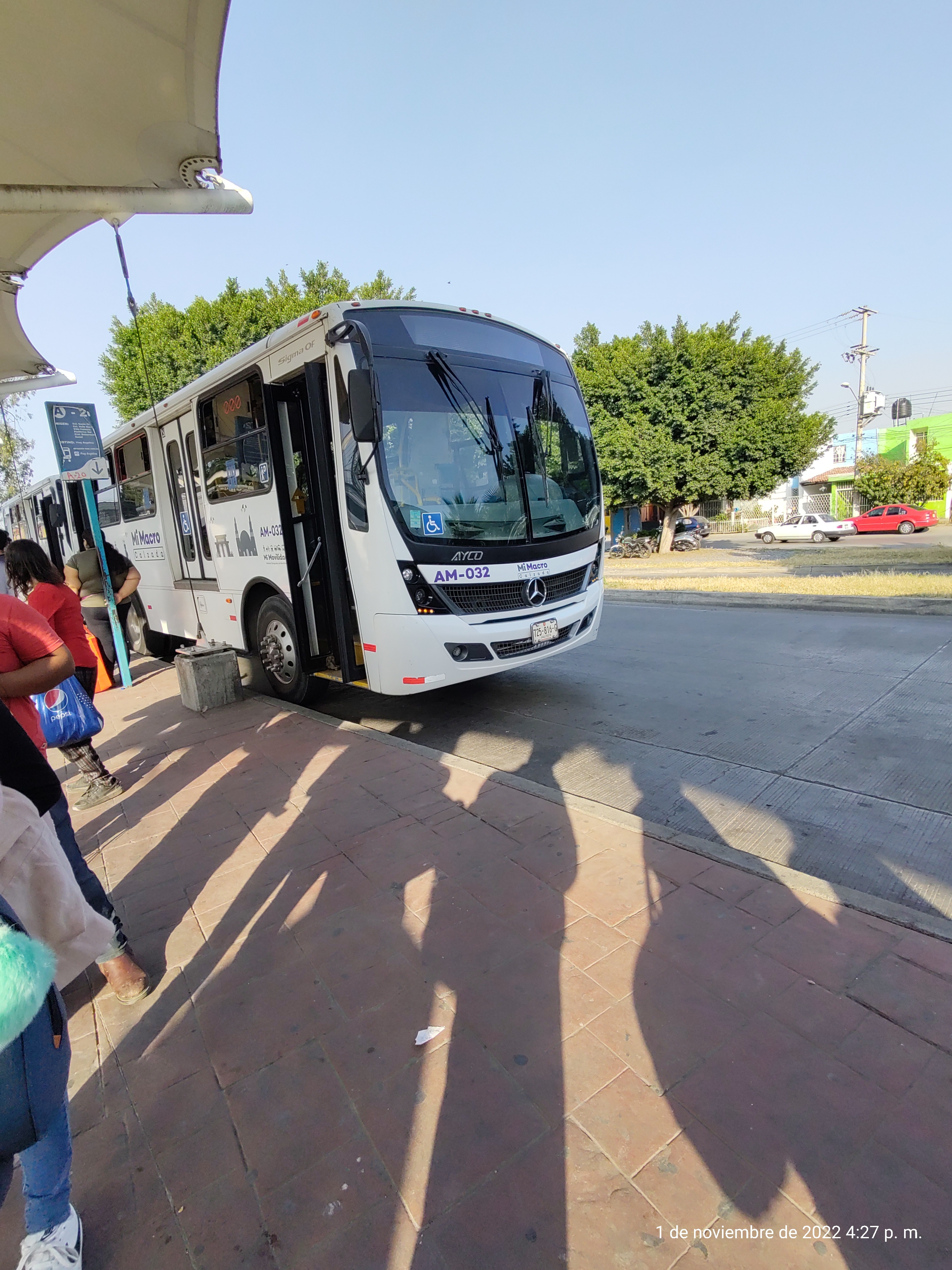
Feeder bus of the Mi Macro Calzada at the Fray Angélico station.

In February 2008, there were 130 bus routes that moved through Independencia roadway and Gobernador Curiel Avenue, serviced by more than 2000 buses. Mi Macro Calzada replaced all the conventional buses along the route. Many routes were erased, while others were modified to cross by the BRT route and serve as feeder buses.

Due to the route of Mi Macro Calzada, numerous public transport routes were rerouted. Among these were routes 142, 142 A, 258 D, 110, 110 A, 207, and 13; they were rerouted away from Independencia roadway and Gobernador Curiel Avenue. Additionally, the 62 D route was eliminated. Currently, the only route that provides service on most of the route of the BRT is the 62 route from Transporte Vanguardista de Occidente, which causes traffic even though it helps to decongest the BRT.

Mi Macro Calzada moves 102 000 daily passengers.

== Routes ==
=== Line 1: Parador Service ===
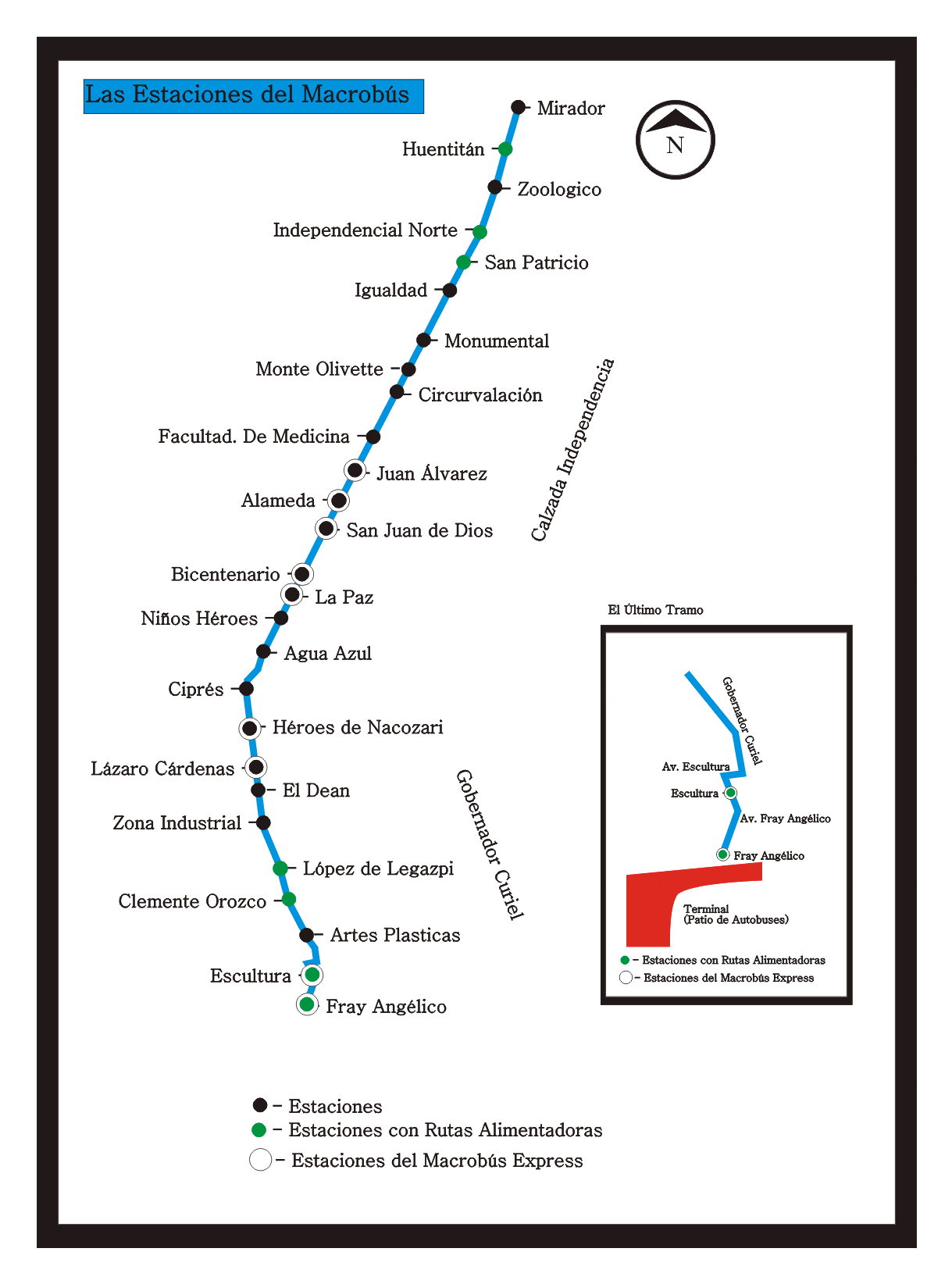
Map of the Mi Macro Calzada system.

Mi Macro Calzada stations: Parador Service

Mirador | Huentitán | Zoológico | Independencia Norte | San Patricio | Igualdad | Monumental | Monte Olivete | Circunvalación | Ciencias de la Salud | Juan Álvarez | Alameda | San Juan de Dios | Bicentenario | La Paz | Niños Héroes | Agua Azul | Ciprés | Héroes de Nacozari | Lázaro Cárdenas | El Deán | Zona Industrial | López de Legazpi | Clemente Orozco | Artes Plásticas | Esculturas | Fray Angélico

The stations with the logo have Express service.

=== Line 1: Express Service ===

The Express service of Mi Macro Calzada was made with the objective of providing a faster service to its users. It operates providing service only in 12 of the 27 stations. Since September 17, 2014, the service was extended until the Mirador station, spanning 5 more stations, which are: Clemente Orozco, Circunvalación, San Patricio, Independencia Norte and Mirador; the objective being to offload the Parador Service during peak hours, as well as reducing the travel time almost in half.

It is worth noting that the Express service provides a special service in the Monumental station, located on Independencia Norte roadway, between Fidel Velázquez and Monte Carmelo streets, the days when there's a game in the Jalisco stadium after 18:00.

Express stations of Mi Macro Calzada: 3rd generation (current)

Mirador | Independencia Norte | San Patricio | Circunvalación | Juan Álvarez | San Juan de Dios | Bicentenario | Niños Héroes | Lázaro Cárdenas | Clemente Orozco | Esculturas | Fray Angélico

Before September 17, 2014, there were only 7 express stations.

Express stations of Mi Macro Calzada: 2nd generation

Juan Álvarez | San Juan de Dios | Bicentenario | Niños Héroes | Lázaro Cárdenas | Esculturas | Fray Angélico

Originally there were only 9 express stations. The Alameda, La Paz and Héroes de Nacozari stations were included in this generation.

Like in this example:

Express stations of Mi Macro Calzada: 1st generation

Juan Álvarez | Alameda | San Juan de Dios | Bicentenario | La Paz | Héroes de Nacozari | Lázaro Cárdenas | Esculturas | Fray Angélico

The Niños Héroes station did not provide this service; nevertheless, the route was modified to include it, reducing the stops and travel time for the users of this station.

=== Feeder routes ===
Routes
Ruta	Start	End
A03	San Patricio station	Santa Elena de la Cruz
A05	Independencia Norte station	Barranca de Huentitán
A06	Esculturas station	La Arenera colony
A07	Esculturas station	Cerro del Cuatro colony
A08	Esculturas station	Quintas del Valle neighbourhood
A09	Esculturas station	El Carmen colony
A10	Esculturas station	La Guadalupana colony
A13	Clemente Orozco station	1 de Mayo colony
A15	Fray Angélico station	Artesanos colony
A16	Independencia Norte station	Panorámica de Huentitán
A17	Esculturas station	El Refugio colony
A18	Fray Angélico station	Paseos del Prado neighbourhood
A19	Fray Angélico station	Chulavista
A20	Fray Angélico station	Hacienda Santa Fe
A21	Fray Angélico station	Chulavista

According to INEGI data, Mi Macro Calzada operates with 40 units on working days and with 26 on weekends. In 2017 the units travelled 4,151,560 kilometres (2,579,660 miles), that is, an average of 346,000 kilometres (215,000 miles) per month; and that same year they moved 38 333 585 passengers (of which 18% paid with discount or courtesy), 3.2 millions per month on average.

Year	Travelled kilometres	Passengers	Full price passengers	Full price passengers percentage	Income
2011	3 786 208	22 168 372	15 838 871	71.45 %	172 287 000
2012	3 584 979	22 484 658	15 819 072	70.35 %	178 057 000
2013	3 638 933	28 509 712	22 098 580	77.51 %	180 181 000
2014	3 261 212	30 531 011	23 766 957	77.85 %	208 928 000
2015	3 650 392	32 570 126	26 021 551	79.89 %	225 775 000
2016	3 944 556	35 523 663	28 607 221	80.53 %	234 643 000
2017	4 151 560	38 333 585	31 287 959	81.62 %	246 190 000

== See also ==
- Mi Macro Periférico
- Guadalajara Macrobús
- Line 2 of the Guadalajara light rail system
- Line 3 of the Guadalajara light rail system
- Line 4 of the Guadalajara light rail system
- Guadalajara light rail system
- Bus rapid transit
