= Mi Macro Periférico =

Bus rapid transit line in Mexico

Mi Macro Periférico

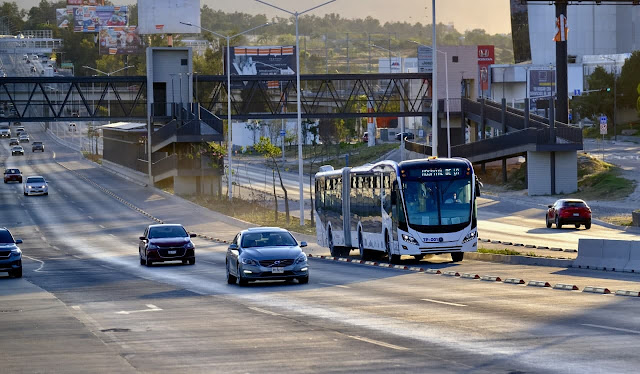

Overview
- Owner: Jalisco Government
- Area served: Guadalajara, Tlaquepaque, Zapopan, Tonalá and Tlajomulco
- Locale: Jalisco
- Transit type: Bus rapid transit
- Line number: 2
- Number of stations: 42
- Website: Mi Macro Periférico

Operation
- Began operation: January 31, 2022; 4 years ago
- Operators: Peribús Metropolitano; Alianza de Camioneros de Jalisco
- Character: The line runs over the Periférico ring, so there are almost no semaphores, making the line run efficiently, even at peak hours
- Headway: 3 to 6 mins.

Technical
- System length: 41.6 km (25.8 mi)
- Track gauge: 2.324 m
- Average speed: 55 km/h (34.18 mph)
- Top speed: 80 km/h (49.71 mph)
System map

Mi Macro Periférico is the second BRT line in the Guadalajara metropolitan area. It runs on 41.6 kilometres (25.8 mi) along the Anillo Periférico Manuel Gómez Morin from its crossing with the Artesanos Avenue until the Solidaridad Iberoamericana Avenue, commonly known as Carretera a Chapala (Road to Chapala). It has a total of 42 stations between Carretera a Chapala and Barranca de Huentitán. The line has connections with line 1 and line 3 of the Guadalajara light rail system, lines 1 and 4 of SITREN and Mi Macro Calzada.

Its main stations are: "Independencia Norte", which connects with the first BRT line, "Mi Macro Calzada", "Periférico Norte", which connects with Line 1 of the light rail and Mi Transporte Eléctrico, "Periférico Belenes", which connects with Line 3 of the light rail, "Vallarta", which connects with Line 1 and 1B of SITREN, and "Periférico Sur", which connects again with Line 1 of the light rail.

== History ==
In 2013 the government of Aristóteles Sandoval presented the proposal of retaking the BRT project in Guadalajara with the Peribús, a line of articulated buses that would run along the Anillo Periférico, from Carretera a Chapala until the Tonalá Centre with a route of around 70 kilometres (43 mi). The idea entered planning stage, and in 2015 it was formalised, stating that it would have 97 stations on which around 182 buses, 12 metres long, would service. It was expected to have a demand of 170,000 daily passengers, the operation would be joint between SITEUR and the Alianza de Camioneros de Jalisco.

The complexity of the project caused the construction and operation plans to be delayed, and in 2016 it was speculated that the project would not be taken further during Sandoval's administration due to a lack of budget. That same year the initial project was cut, by tracing a route between the Belisario Domínguez Avenue and Carretera a Chapala, thus the project only got as far as 41.5 kilometres (25.8 mi) instead of the initial 70 km (43 mi). Even then, Sandoval's intention stood, assuring that it would move 370 thousand daily passengers. Due to budget, construction, and infrastructure issues, the project was paralysed.

In February 2019 the state government, headed by Enrique Alfaro Ramírez, inserted in the state budget an entry for 200 million pesos to begin the repaving works of Periférico with the objective to retake the works of the Peribús, using as a base the 41.5 kilometres trace proposed in 2016. In November 2019, the works for the first stage of the transport system started, which by the time got renamed to Mi Macro Periférico, said project was inaugurated on 30 January 2022, by the state governor. The system has connections with the lines 1 and 3 of the light rail, the line 1 of Mi Macro and the lines 1, 1B and 4 of SITREN.

== Routes ==
To decongest the main trunk (T01) two more trunks were made, the second trunk (T02) departs from the northern terminal (Barranca de Huentitán) until Chapalita Inn, the third trunk (T03) departs from the former station until the southern terminal (Carretera a Chapala). The line also has three complementary routes, which enter the stations and on certain sections leave the confined lane to service on nearby colonies as normal buses. Thanks to the trunks and complementaries system, the system is able to handle a minimum headway of 3 minutes, as mentioned by the head of SITEUR. This line will not have an Express service like the first line.

=== Trunk 01 ===
Trunk 01 stations
Las Pintas | Artesanos | Adolf Horn | Toluquilla | 8 de Julio | San Sebastianito | Periférico Sur | Terminal Sur de Autobuses | ITESO | López Mateos | Agrícola | El Briseño | Mariano Otero | Miramar | Felipe Ruvalcaba | El Colli | Chapalita Inn | Parque Metropolitano | Ciudad Granja | Ciudad Judicial | Estadio Chivas | Vallarta | San Juan de Ocotán | 5 de Mayo | Acueducto | Santa Margarita | La Tuzanía | Periférico Belenes | San Isidro | Centro Cultural Universitario | Constitución | Tabachines | La Cantera | Periférico Norte | El Batán | La Experiencia | Rancho Nuevo | Lomas del Paraíso | Independencia Norte | Zoológico Guadalajara | Barranca de Huentitán

=== Trunk 02 ===
Trunk 02 stations
Zoológico Guadalajara | Independencia Norte | Lomas del Paraíso | Rancho Nuevo | La Experiencia | El Batán | Periférico Norte | La Cantera | Tabachines | Constitución | Centro Cultural Universitario | San Isidro | Periférico Belenes | La Tuzanía | Santa Margarita | Acueducto | 5 de Mayo | San Juan de Ocotán | Vallarta | Estadio Chivas Ciudad Judicial | Ciudad Granja | Parque Metropolitano

=== Trunk 03 ===
Trunk 03 stations
Las Pintas | Artesanos | Adolf Horn | Toluquilla | 8 de Julio | San Sebastianito | Periférico Sur | Terminal Sur de Autobuses | ITESO | López Mateos | Agrícola | El Briseño | Mariano Otero | Miramar | Felipe Ruvalcaba | El Colli | Chapalita Inn

=== Complementaries ===
For the complementary routes dual-units are used, just like those that currently run in the Express route of Mi Macro Calzada. This is to allow transfers from street-level to station-level and vice versa without leaving the unit and without needing to pay again.

Complementary routes
Route	Start	End	Previous route name
MP-C01	Carretera a Chapala	La Cantera	380 (currently T19)
MP-C02	Barranca de Huentitán	San Juan de Ocotán	380-A (currently T19-C01)
MP-C03	Chapalita Inn	Central de Autobuses railway station	619 White (currently T19-C07)

=== Feeder routes ===
Feeders
Route	Start	End	Previous route name
A01	Barranca de Huentitán	Alfredo Barba colony	78 (currently T19-C04)
A02	Barranca de Huentitán	San Pedrito colony	78-C (currently T19-C03)
A03	Centro Cultural Universitario	Acueducto	320-A (currently C68)
A04	Estación Periférico Sur	Lomas de San Agustín colony	619 Blue (currently T19-C06)
A05-1	Estación Periférico Sur	Chulavista (via Adolf Horn)	619 Red (currently T19-C07)
A05-2	Estación Periférico Sur	Chulavista (via López Mateos)	619 Red (currently T19-C07)
A06	Barranca de Huentitán	Basilio Badillo colony	368 (currently T19-C05)
A07	Barranca de Huentitán	Old Guadalajara Central Bus station	320 (currently C68)

The route C98 of Mi Transporte Eléctrico also functions as a feeder route of Mi Macro Periférico, since, like the other feeder routes, when boarding from/to route the payment system also makes a 50% discount. This route runs all over the north, east, and new east Anillo Periférico, with two destinations: the University Centre of Tonalá, in the municipality of the same name, and the Guadalajara International Airport, located on Carretera a Chapala in the municipality of Tlajomulco de Zúñiga.

Mi Transporte Eléctrico
Route	Start	End	End	Previous route name
C98	Periférico Norte railway station	Via 1: University Centre of Tonalá	Via 2: Guadalajara International Airport	368 CUT

== See also ==
- Mi Macro Calzada
- Guadalajara Macrobús
- Line 1 of the Guadalajara light rail system
- Line 3 of the Guadalajara light rail system
- Guadalajara light rail system
- Bus rapid transit
