= Guadalajara Mi Macro =

Bus rapid transit (BRT) system in Guadalajara, Jalisco, Mexico

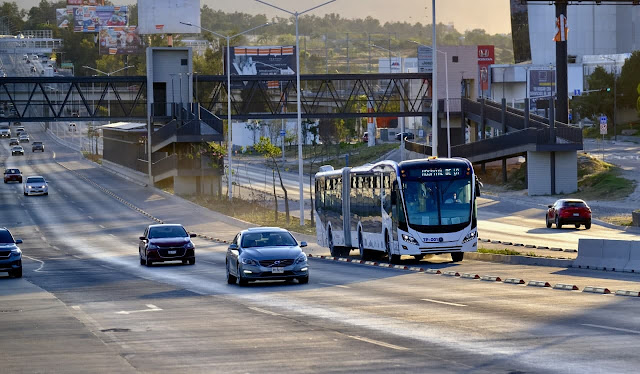
- Mi Macro Periférico unit circulating in the exclusive lane
- Founded: March 10, 2009
- Locale: Guadalajara, Jalisco
- Service type: bus rapid transit
- Routes: 3
- Stops: 77 total: 27 on Calzada line; 42 on Periférico line and 9 on Aeropuerto line.
- Stations: 31
- Fuel type: diesel
- Operator: Alianza de Camioneros de Jalisco, Peribús Metropolitano
- Website: Mi Macro on the SITEUR website (Spanish)
System map

The Guadalajara Mi Macro (formerly Macrobús) is a bus rapid transit (BRT) system in Guadalajara, Jalisco, Mexico. The initiation of work on the system was announced by Jalisco Governor Emilio González Márquez on February 29, 2008. The system was launched on March 10, 2009 by him and Mexican President Felipe Calderón Hinojosa.

== Lines ==
The first line runs 16.6 km (10.3 mi) along Calzada Independencia and Gobernador Curiel avenues with a total of 27 stations, including two terminals: Mirador (northern terminus, in Guadalajara) and Fray Angélico (southern terminus, in Tlaquepaque). The line intersects the LRT's Line 2 at San Juan de Dios station. After the LRT Line 3 was completed in 2016, a second transfer point was created at the station immediately south, Bicentenario (BRT) / Independencia (LRT-3).

The first line has been renamed Mi Macro Calzada to distinguish it from the second BRT line running along the Anillo Periférico Manuel Gómez Morin ring road, which opened in 2022. The second line is named Mi Macro Periférico and includes 42 stations over a 41.5 km (25.8 mi) route. The Periférico line, formerly nicknamed Peribús, was initially projected to serve 364,000 daily riders; it was first funded in January 2017 from Fondo Nacional de Infraestructura (Fonadin, the National Infrastructure Fund) with a grant of 660.8 million pesos, subsidizing a larger contribution from the Jalisco state government. Work on the Periférico line began in November 2019, and was projected to complete in 2021.

The third line is named Mi Macro Aeropuerto or Mi Macro Línea 5 and includes 31 stations over a 32 km (20 mi) route. It was opened in June 2026 to connect Guadalajara International Airport with various points in the city.

=== Calzada ===
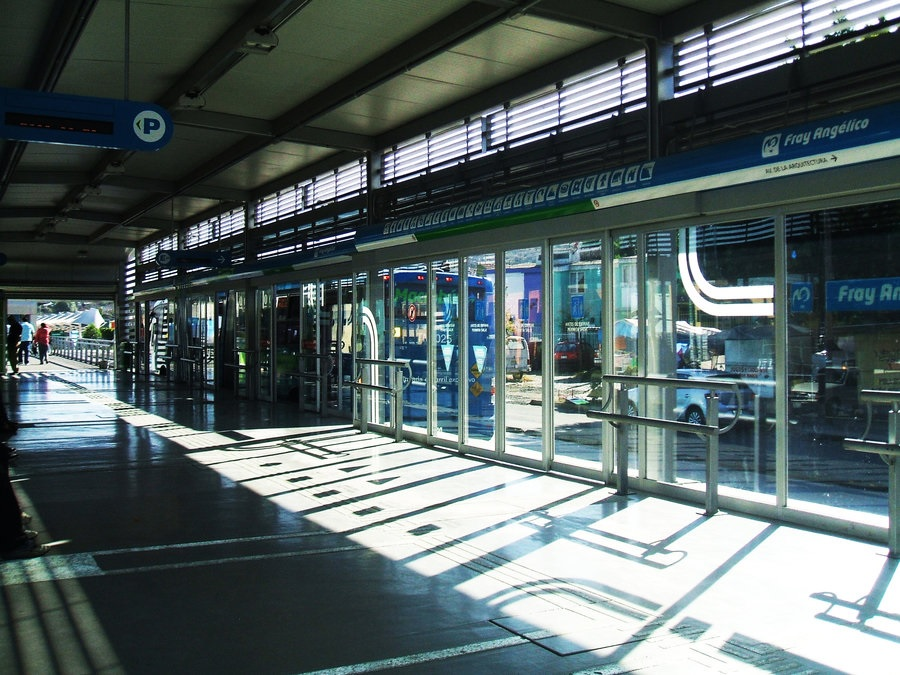
Interior of Fray Angélico station, southern terminus of the Calzada line

The stations on the Calzada line (from north to south) are:

1. Mirador (Express)
2. Huentitán
3. Zoológico
4. Independencia Norte (Express)
5. San Patricio (Express)
6. Igualdad
7. Monumental
8. Monte Olivette
9. Circunvalación (Express)
10. Ciencias de la Salud
11. Juan Álvarez (Express)
12. Alameda
13. San Juan de Dios (Express; transfer to LRT Line 2)
14. Bicentenario (Express; transfer to LRT Line 3)
15. La Paz
16. Niños Héroes (Express)
17. Agua Azul
18. Ciprés
19. Héroes de Nacozari
20. Lázaro Cárdenas (Express)
21. El Deán
22. Zona Industrial
23. López de Legazpi
24. Clemente Orozco (Express)
25. Artes Plasticas
26. Escultura (Express)
27. Fray Angélico (Express)

Regular service takes approximately 46 minutes each way and operates from 5:00 AM to 11:00 PM. Limited-stop service (38 minutes each way) operates from 5:00 AM to 9:00 PM, connecting the stations noted as "Express" above. Typical headways are 8 minutes, with 5 minute headways during rush hours.

=== Periférico ===
The stations on the Periférico line (counterclockwise) are:

1. Barranca de Huentitán
2. Zoológico Guadalajara
3. Independencia Norte (transfer to BRT Calzada)
4. Lomas del Paraíso
5. Rancho Nuevo
6. La Experiencia
7. El Batán
8. Periférico Norte (transfer to LRT Line 1)
9. La Cantera
10. Tabachines
11. Constitución
12. Centro Cultural Universitario
13. San Isidro
14. Periférico Belenes (transfer to LRT Line 3)
15. Tuzanía
16. Santa Margarita
17. Acueducto
18. 5 de Mayo
19. San Juan de Ocotán
20. Vallarta (transfer to SiTren L1)
21. Estadio Chivas
22. Ciudad Judicial
23. Ciudad Granja
24. Parque Metropolitano
25. Chapalita Inn
26. El Colli
27. Felipe Ruvalcaba
28. Miramar
29. Mariano Otero
30. El Briseño
31. Agrícola
32. López Mateos
33. ITESO
34. Terminal Sur de Autobuses
35. Periférico Sur (transfer to LRT Line 1)
36. San Sebastianito
37. 8 de Julio
38. Toluquilla
39. Adolf Horn
40. Jalisco 200 Años (transfer to LRT Line 4)
41. Artesanos
42. Las Pintas
43. Carretera a Chapala

Under the original plan, there were 53 stations served by a fleet of 105 18 m (59 ft) (nominal length) articulated buses.

=== Aeropuerto ===
The stations on the Aeropuerto line are:

1. Chapalita Inn
2. El Colli
3. Felipe Ruvalcaba
4. Miramar
5. Mariano Otero
6. El Briseño
7. Agrícola
8. López Mateos
9. ITESO
10. Terminal Sur de Autobuses
11. Periférico Sur (transfer to LRT Line 1)
12. San Sebastianito
13. 8 de Julio
14. Toluquilla
15. Adolf Horn
16. Jalisco 200 Años (transfer to LRT Line 4)
17. Artesanos
18. Las Pintas
19. Carretera a Chapala
20. Las Liebres
21. Parque Montenegro
22. Las Torres
23. Las Pintitas
24. La Gigantera
25. La Piedrera
26. San José del Quince
27. Aeropuerto

In addition, there are three additional lines, two run along the Aeropuerto–Carretera a Chapala–Agua Azul–Expo Guadalajara route and another runs by the route Aeropuerto–Carretera a Chapala–Chapalita Inn–Estadio Chivas–Tabachines, all routes are served by a fleet of 41 buses.

=== Proposed expansion ===
In 2009, additional lines were planned and scheduled to open in 2010, soon after the opening of Macrobús Line 1. These included:

- Macrobús Line 2 would run along Avenida Ávila Camacho and Calzada Revolución from Doctor Ángel Leaño in Zapopan to the new central bus terminal in Tlaquepaque. This route was later used for LRT Line 3.
- Macrobús Line 3 would run along Calzada del Obrero (Fed. 15) and Calzada Jesús González Gallo (Fed. 23) from Juan Pablo and Periferico to Glorieta El Álamo in Tlaquepaque. This line will eventually be extended to the Guadalajara International Airport in Tlajomulco along Fed. 44.

Instituto de Políticas para el Transporte y el Desarrollo (ITDP) proposed an expansion of the Macrobús system with six new lines to a total of 135.4 km (84.1 mi) in addition to the Calzada line. The first of the proposed lines was a 36.3 km (22.6 mi) subset of the present Periférico line. Other proposed lines were largely laid out along radial spokes and included:

- Lázaro Cárdenas: serving 129,000 daily passengers on a 23.1 km (14.4 mi) similar to the earlier proposed Line 3 along Fed. 15 and Fed. 23
- Lopez Mateos: 54,000 passengers, 13.6 km (8.5 mi)
- 8 de Julio: 88,000 passengers, 23.5 km (14.6 mi), parallel to the southern half of LRT Line 1
- Vallarta: 38,000 passengers, 25.4 km (15.8 mi), acting as a western extension to LRT Line 2
- Gallo y Michel: 24,000 passengers, 13.5 km (8.4 mi)

== Fleet ==
Mi Macro fleet
Fleet Nos.	Years	Mfr.	Model	Image	Length	Notes
TM-001— TM-041	2008–present	Volvo	7300 BRT		18 m 59 ft	Initial procurement for 41 buses to inaugurate Macrobús Line 1 (Mi Macro Calzada).
TM-042— TM-045	2014–present	DINA S.A.	BRighTer		18.145 m 59.53 ft	4 supplemental buses for Mi Macro Calzada.
	2021–present	Mercedes / Busscar	O 500 MA 2836		18.2 m 60 ft	37 buses for Periférico Line.

The initial Macrobús fleet included 41 blue articulated Volvo 7300 BRT buses, which are built on the Volvo B12M chassis and compliant with the Euro IV emissions standard. Mexico City also uses Volvo 7300 BRT buses for the Metrobús BRT system, but the Mexico City Volvo 7300 BRT buses are 25 m long (82 ft) bi-articulated buses, while the Guadalajara BRT system uses 18 m long (59 ft) single-articulated buses. 27 of the 41 were refurbished by July 2021 to extend their life by five years.

In 2014, Guadalajara added four red articulated DINA S.A. Brighter (stylized as BRighTer to emphasize its use in BRT systems) buses to the Macro Calzada fleet. The newer DINA buses are compliant with the stricter Euro V emissions standard, and are equipped with a Cummins ISM 10.8L six-cylinder engine and a six-speed Allison Transmission. Neither the Volvo nor DINA buses are equipped with air conditioning.

For the Periférico Line, Mi Macro will use 37 articulated buses built on the Mercedes-Benz O 500 MA 2836 chassis, bodied by Busscar. The O 500 MA 2836 is also compliant with the Euro V emissions standard and is equipped with a six-cylinder OM 457 diesel engine.

== Impact and ridership ==
As of February 2008, there were 130 bus routes running along Calzada Independencia and Gobernador Curiel, serviced by more than 2,000 buses. The goal of the BRT was to replace all non-BRT buses along the route, with many routes eliminated altogether and others altered so as to cross the BRT route and serve as feeder buses. It was expected that, upon the initial route's launch, the BRT system would achieve a daily ridership of over 174,000 passengers.
