= Alejandro Zohn =

Mexican architect (1930–2000)

- Alexander Zohn Rosenthal
- Born: Alexander Zohn Rosenthal; August 8, 1930; Vienna, Austria
- Died: August 4, 2000 (aged 69); Guadalajara, Mexico
- Resting place: Recinto de la Paz, Guadalajara
- Citizenship: Austria, Mexico (from 1975)
- Education: University of Guadalajara
- Known for: Architecture
- Notable work: Mercado Libertad (San Juan de Dios Market), Auditorio Municipal de Guadalajara, Plaza del Sol
- Style: Modernist architecture
- Movement: Modernism
- Spouse: Celia Muldoon (m. 1960)
- Parent(s): Jakob Hersch Zohn Wurn (father), Haica Rosenthal Eisenstein (mother)
- Awards: Premio Jalisco; 1957; Premio Jalisco (state government); 2000

Alejandro Zohn Rosenthal (born Alexander Zohn; 8 August 1930 – 4 August 2000) was a Mexican architect of Jewish origin. His works are renowned for the contributions to modern architecture in Mexico, particularly in Guadalajara where his works such as the San Juan de Dios Market have left a lasting impact on Mexico's modernist architecture.

== Early life and education ==
Zohn was born in Vienna, Austria to an Austrian-Jewish family. Zohn's parents, Haica Rosenthal Eisenstein was a pharmaceutical chemist and professor. His father, Jakob Hersch Zohn Wurn an accountant and businessman. Following Austria's annexation by Nazi Germany, his family fled to Mexico in 1939 after his father was released from the Dachau concentration camp. They settled in San Pedro Tlaquepaque, Jalisco.

He completed his primary and secondary education at Colegio Cervantes in Guadalajara before enrolling in the University of Guadalajara's Faculty of Engineering. Drawn by his interest in classical music, aesthetics, and design, he transferred to the School of Architecture in 1950. He earned his civil engineering degree in 1955 with a thesis on the Mercado Libertad, and later obtained his architecture degree in 1962 with the thesis "The Architecture of Reinforced Concrete."

== Career ==
Zohn began teaching at the University of Guadalajara in 1956, but resigned in 1963 following student protests over his rigorous academic approach. He maintained strong ties with the university throughout his life.

In addition to his teaching career, he co-founded Arquitac (Arquitectura, Asociación Civil) in 1961, and later conducted extensive research on affordable housing solutions across various cities in Mexico. His contributions earned him a position as an honorary member of the Academia Nacional de Arquitectura in 1980 and membership in Mexico's Sistema Nacional de Creadores Artísticos in 1994.

Zohn also lectured internationally, with engagements in the U.S., Colombia, Chile, Austria, Hungary, and the Czech Republic. In 2000, his work was featured in a retrospective exhibition at the Instituto Cultural Cabañas.

== Architectural works ==
Some of Zohn's most notable architectural projects include:

- Mercado Libertad (San Juan de Dios Market), Guadalajara (1953–1958)
- Auditorio Municipal de Guadalajara (1957)
- Unidad Deportiva La Federacha, Guadalajara (1967)
- Plaza del Sol, Guadalajara (1969)
- Unidad Habitacional Culhuacán, Mexico City (1975–1977)
- Remodelación del Centro Cultural El Refugio, San Pedro Tlaquepaque (1984)
- Mexican Heritage Center and Gardens, San José, California (1995)

== Awards and honors ==
Zohn received numerous awards and recognitions, including:

- Premio Jalisco for the Mercado Libertad project (1957)
- Gran Premio de la IV Bienal in Sofia, Bulgaria (1991)
- Honoris Causa from the Colegio de Arquitectos de Jalisco (1991)
- Homenaje ARPA-FIL at the Guadalajara International Book Fair (1999)
- Premio Jalisco from the state government (2000)
- In 2007, Mercado Libertad was declared a National Artistic Monument

== Personal life ==
Zohn married Celia Muldoon in 1960 and obtained Mexican citizenship in 1975. He died on August 4, 2000, in Guadalajara, where he was laid to rest at the Recinto de la Paz.
