= Line 4 (Sistema de Tren Eléctrico Urbano) =

Light rail line of Guadalajara, Mexico

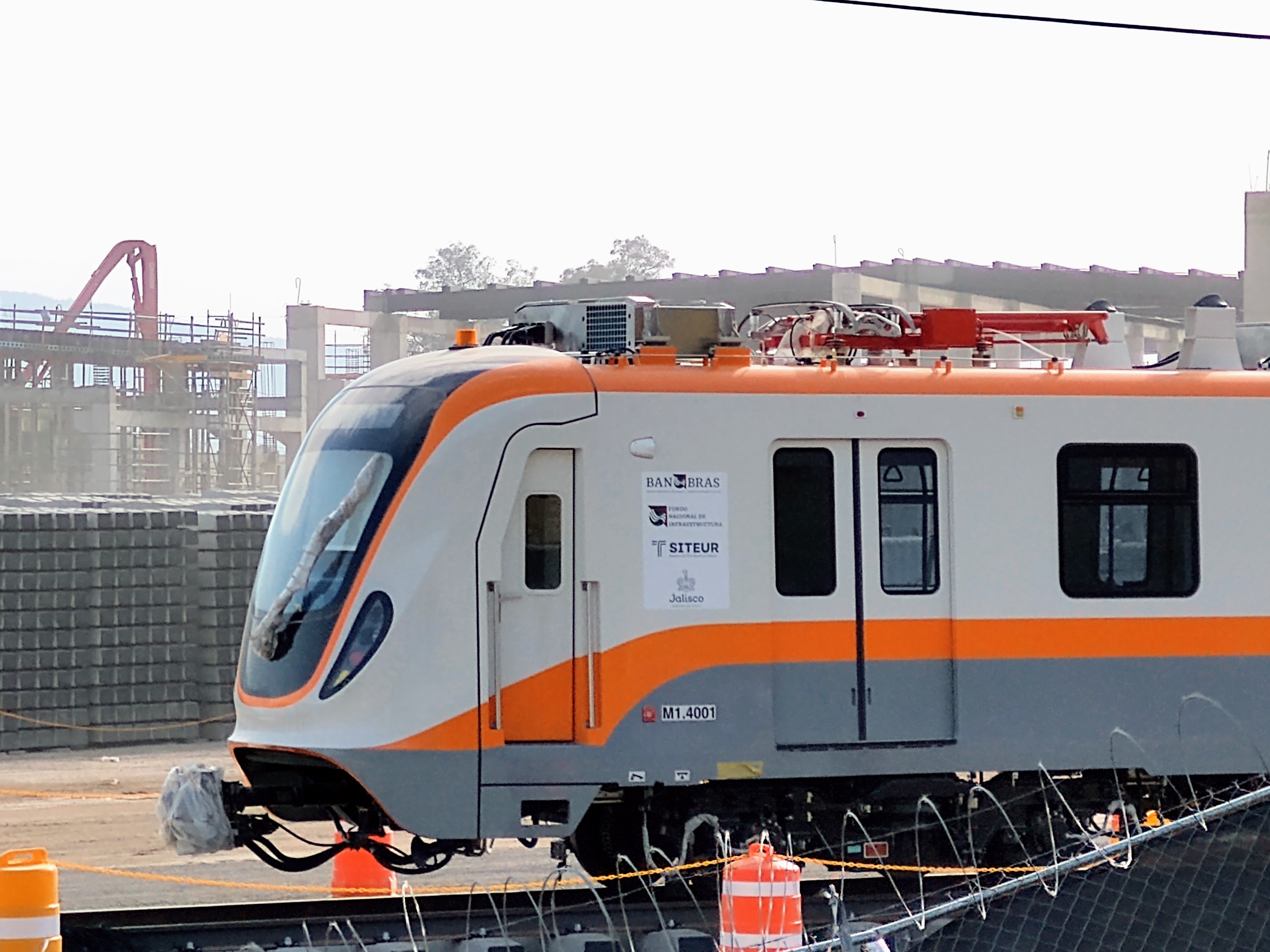
- Train 4001 at the Line 4 yard.

Overview
- Native name: Línea 4 del Tren Eléctrico Urbano de Guadalajara
- Area served: Guadalajara, Tlaquepaque and Tlajomulco
- Locale: Jalisco, Mexico
- Transit type: Light rail
- Line number: 4
- Number of stations: 8
- Website: linea4.jalisco.gob.mx

Operation
- Began operation: December 15, 2025
- Operator: Sistema de Tren Eléctrico Urbano
- Rolling stock: TEG-23
- Headway: 7 minutes (estimated)

Technical
- System length: 21.7 km (13.5 mi)
- Track gauge: 1,435 mm (4 ft 8 1/2 in) standard gauge
- Average speed: 30 km/h (20 mph)
- Top speed: 70 km/h (45 mph)

Line 4 of the Guadalajara Urban Electric Train System (SITEUR) is the fourth public transport railway line in the Guadalajara Metropolitan Area (Mexico), and currently its newest. The line is 21.2 km (13.2 mi) long and runs from the Las Juntas station in central Tlaquepaque to the center of Tlajomulco de Zúñiga at Tlajomulco Centro station.

It is estimated that the number of daily passengers will be 106,000 passengers, and construction will cost 9.137 billion Mexican pesos (approximately 460 million U.S. Dollars). On December 15, 2025, Line 4 was inaugurated. The line is marked orange on system maps.

== History ==
=== Original Line 3 project ===
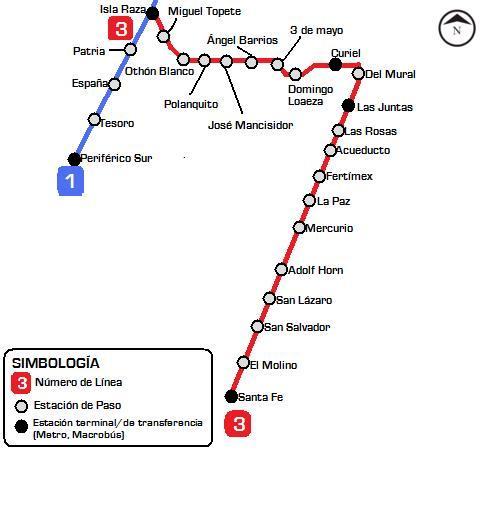
Map of Line 3 proposed by Alfaro and discarded by the local congress in 2009.

In 2009, then-mayor of Tlajomulco, Enrique Alfaro Ramírez, proposed a project for a third line of the Guadalajara light rail to the Jalisco State Congress, however it was rejected by a partisan majority.

The project would have entailed the construction of a completely overground line, which would have run entirely within the southern region of the Guadalajara metropolitan area. Its route would have begun at the Isla Raza station of Line 1, running south over 56th and Miguel Topete Street until Patria Sur Avenue, where it would turn east onto Juan Luis Covarrubias Aqueduct Street, merge onto Patria Avenue at the 5 de Mayo colonia, and turn south onto the existing Ferromex Guadalajara-Manzanillo trackage which would extend into the Hacienda Santa Fe colonia in the municipality of Tlajomulco.

The project was intended to benefit more than 700,000 people in the region, as the zones where the line would have operated in suffered from a lack of public transportation. Nevertheless, the Line 3 project had already been contemplated by the Secretariat of Communications and Transportation, with a similar route to that suggested in 2009.

=== Current project ===
After many years of proposals that aimed to connect Tlajomulco with the rest of the Guadalajara metropolitan area via rail, both then-presidential candidate Andrés Manuel López Obrador, and then-gubernatorial candidate Enrique Alfaro Ramírez, spoke independently in their 2018 campaigns about the construction of a forth line of the electric train system towards the Tlajomulco Centre. After both candidates were elected, a spokesman for López Obrador announced the Isla Raza-Santa Fe project, a route that had been proposed and analyzed during the governorship of Emilio González Márquez.

López Obrador and Alfaro discussed and agreed to resume this project, once more studies about the route to be built were made and some adjustments were considered. The announcement of this work caused mixed reactions among businessmen; the Council of Industrial Chambers of Jalisco presented negative to the project, while the Chamber of the Building Industry of Jalisco announced their support.

In 2020, some doubts arose about President López Obrador’s backing of the project he signed with Jalisco governor Enrique Alfaro Ramírez in July 2019; public doubt faded when, during his speech for the opening of Line 3 on September 12th, 2020, President López Obrador said that he endorsed the promise that he made to build Line 4. Preliminary works for the new line was planned to start in October of that same year.

Construction was planned to start at the end of October 2021, but works did not start until 2022. Preliminary works began on May 6, 2022, and construction was formally started on May 22, 2022, in an inaugural event hosting Governor Alfaro, the municipal presidents of the Guadalajara metropolitan area and some special guests. Construction had been planned to finish in March 2024, . In early May 2025, the Jalisco state government announced that 89% of all work was done for the line. On November 6, 2025, Jalisco Governor Pablo Lemus announced that the line would open on December 15, 2025.

On December 15, 2025, Line 4 was inaugurated into service with the SITEUR network. Service on the line was free for the remainder of 2025, before revenue service began on January 1, 2026. The line exceeded ridership expectations, with the first month of service handling over 820,000 riders by January 15.

== Characteristics ==
Line 4 has a length of 21.2 km (13.2 mi) and a travel time of around 35 min. It runs mainly north-south, from the Miravalle colonia of Tlaquepaque to the Hacienda Agave colonia of Tlajomulco de Zuniga. Its northern terminus is the Las Juntas station, a multimodal transfer center (CETRAM) which connects it with the Fray Angelico station, the southern terminus of the Mi Macro Caldaza bus line. Its southern terminus is at Tlajomulco Centro station, near the geographic center of Tlajomulco and further up north of the existing former Mexican Central Railway train station.

A TEG-23 bound for the northern terminus of Las Juntas pulling into El Cuervo station in 2026

The line principally runs on the existing Ferromex Guadalajara-Manzanillo railway right-of-way, and is triple-tracked along its entire span, with the two westernmost tracks being equipped with overhead lines dedicated to Line 4 and the easternmost track being dedicated to Ferromex freight service. All stations on the line are island platforms placed between the Line 4 tracks.

The line is physically disconnected from the rest of the SITEUR light rail system; it is joined to the rest of Guadalajara’s public transport system by the SITREN Line 6 Mi Macro Caldaza bus line at the Las Juntas/Fray Angélico station, and both the Line 7 Mi Macro Periférico and Line 5 Mi Macro Aeropuerto bus lines at the Jalisco 200 Años station.

=== Stations ===
- Las Juntas 20°36′28.67″N 103°20′26.77″W
- Jalisco 200 Años 20°34′33.56″N 103°21′18.79″W
- Real del Valle 20°33′32.004″N 103°21′57.27″W
- Concepción del Valle 20°31′37.7″N 103°23′5.78″W
- El Cuervo 20°30′27.46″N 103°23′36.27″W
- Lomas del Sur 20°29′8.33″N 103°24′18.14″W
- CUTLAJO 20°28′8.25″N 103°24′54.79″W
- Tlajomulco Centro 20°27′59.47″N 103°26′22.34″W

== Gallery ==
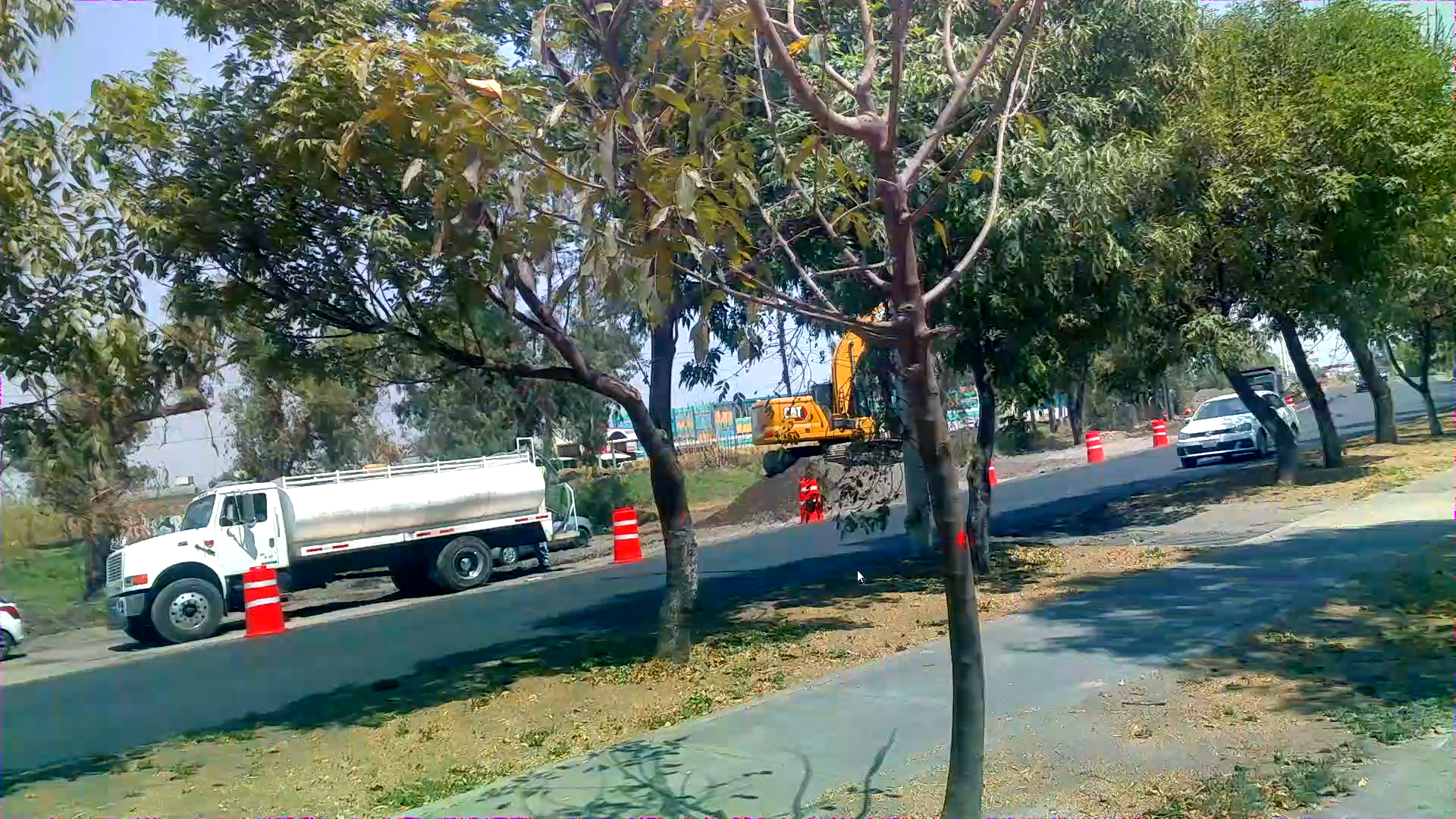
Extension from 3 to 4 lanes on the Adolf Horn crossing with the railway tracks as part of the construction of an overpass under which the electric train will pass.

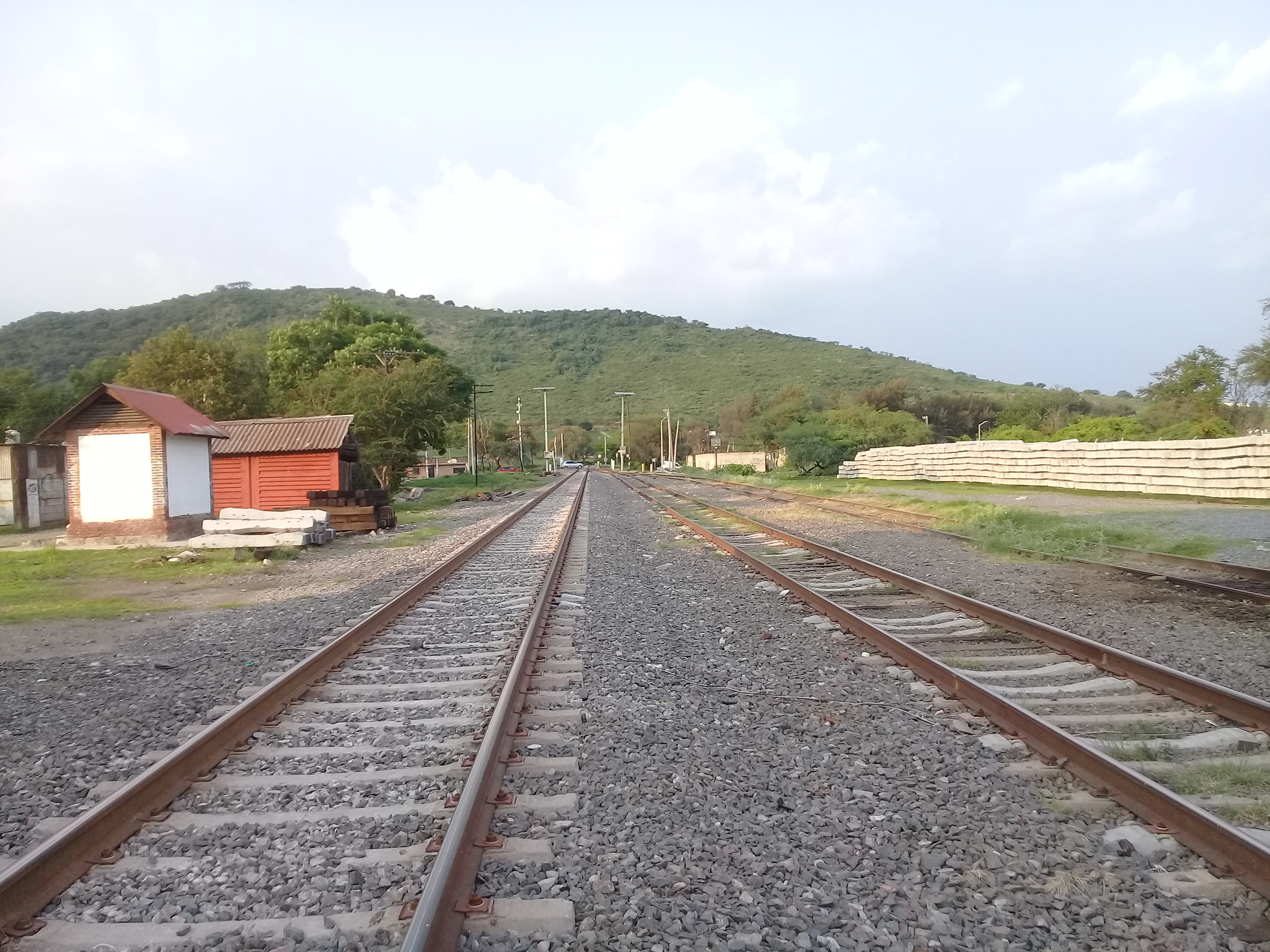
Tracks near the Tlajomulco railway station, the southern terminus of Line 4

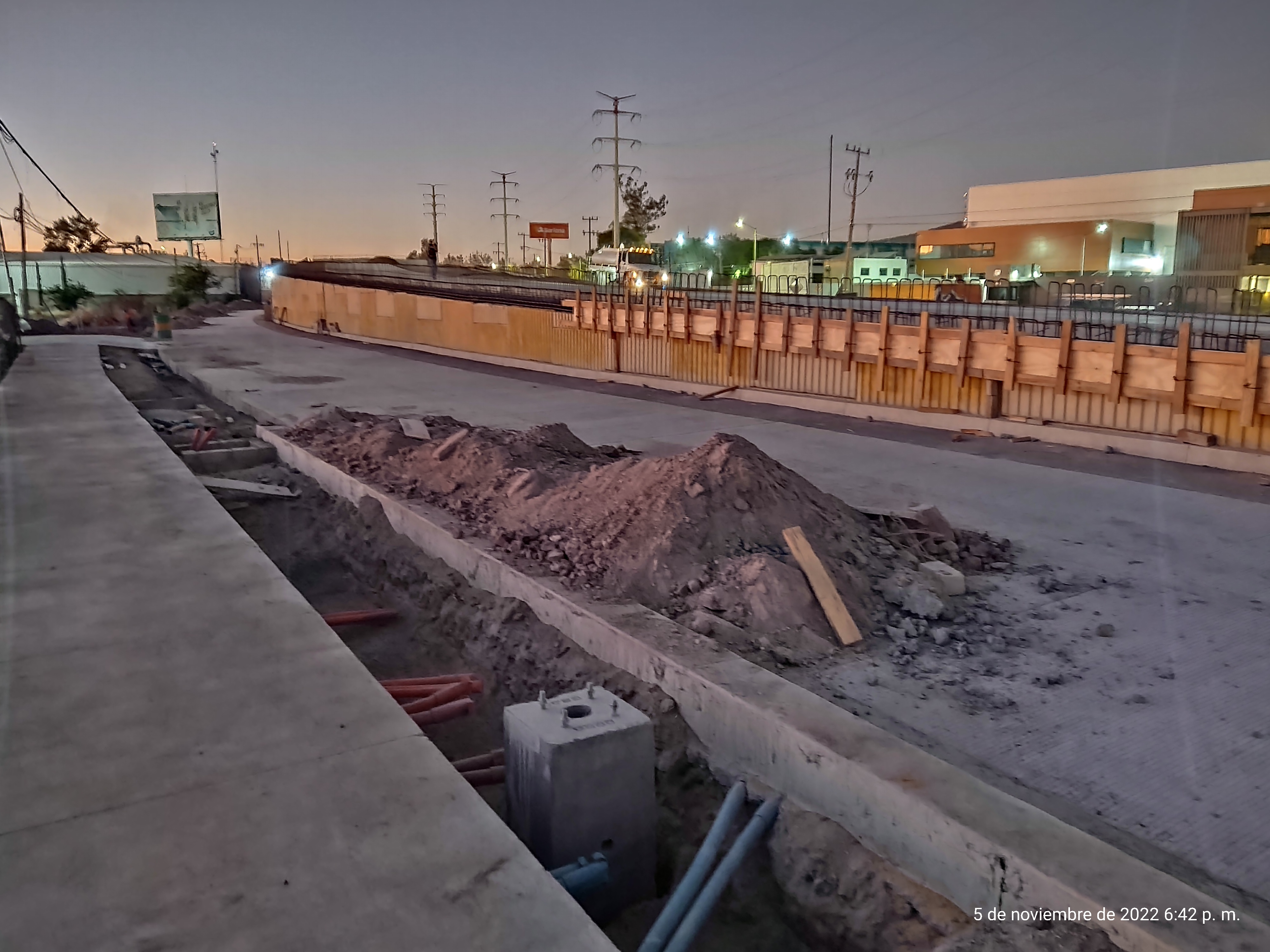
South ramp of the Adolf Horn node in November 2022, first building stage of Line 4.

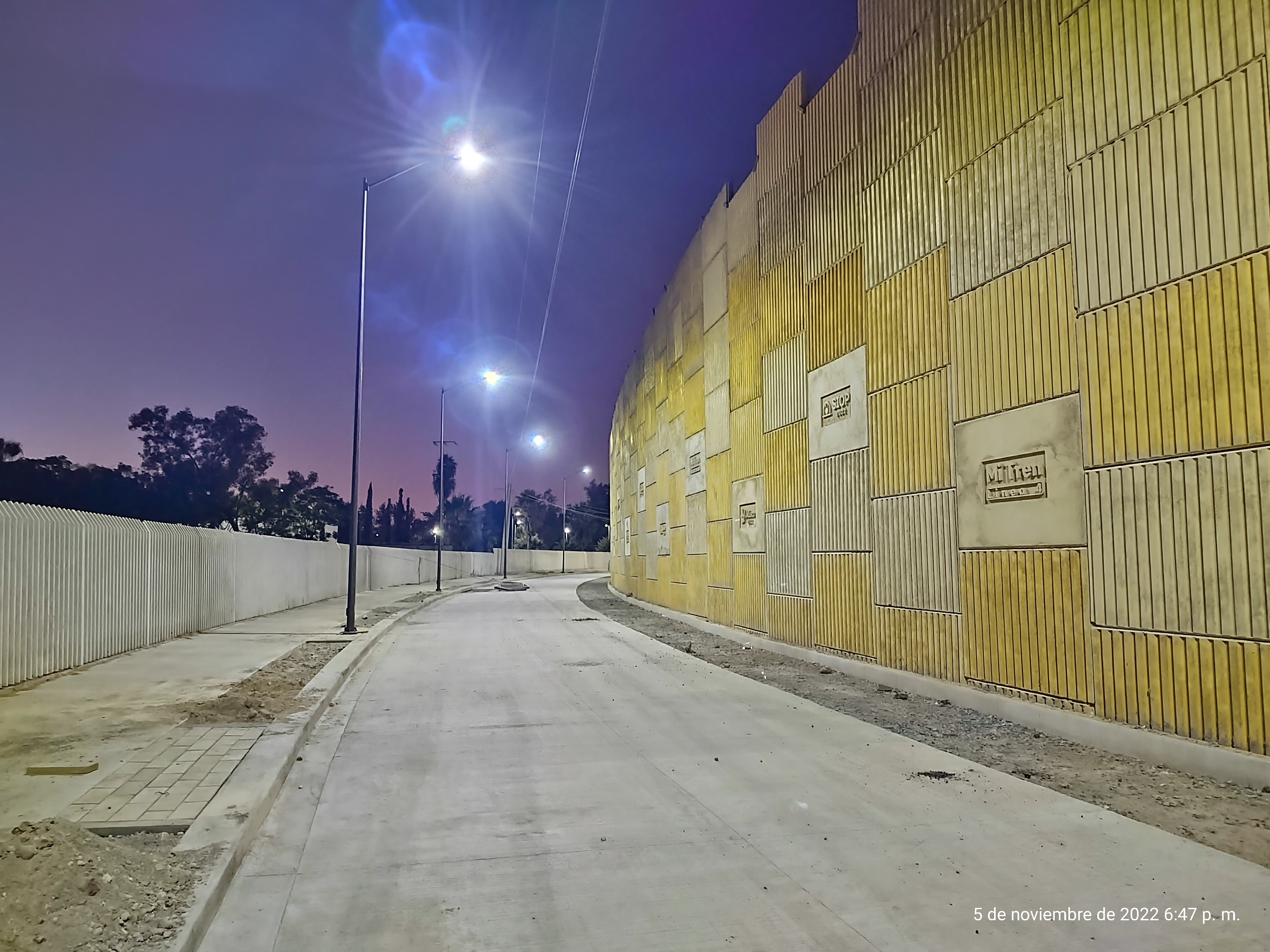
Return of the Adolf Horn node in November 2022.

== See also ==
- Mi Macro Calzada
- Mi Macro Periférico
