= San Juan de Dios Market =

Mexican city market

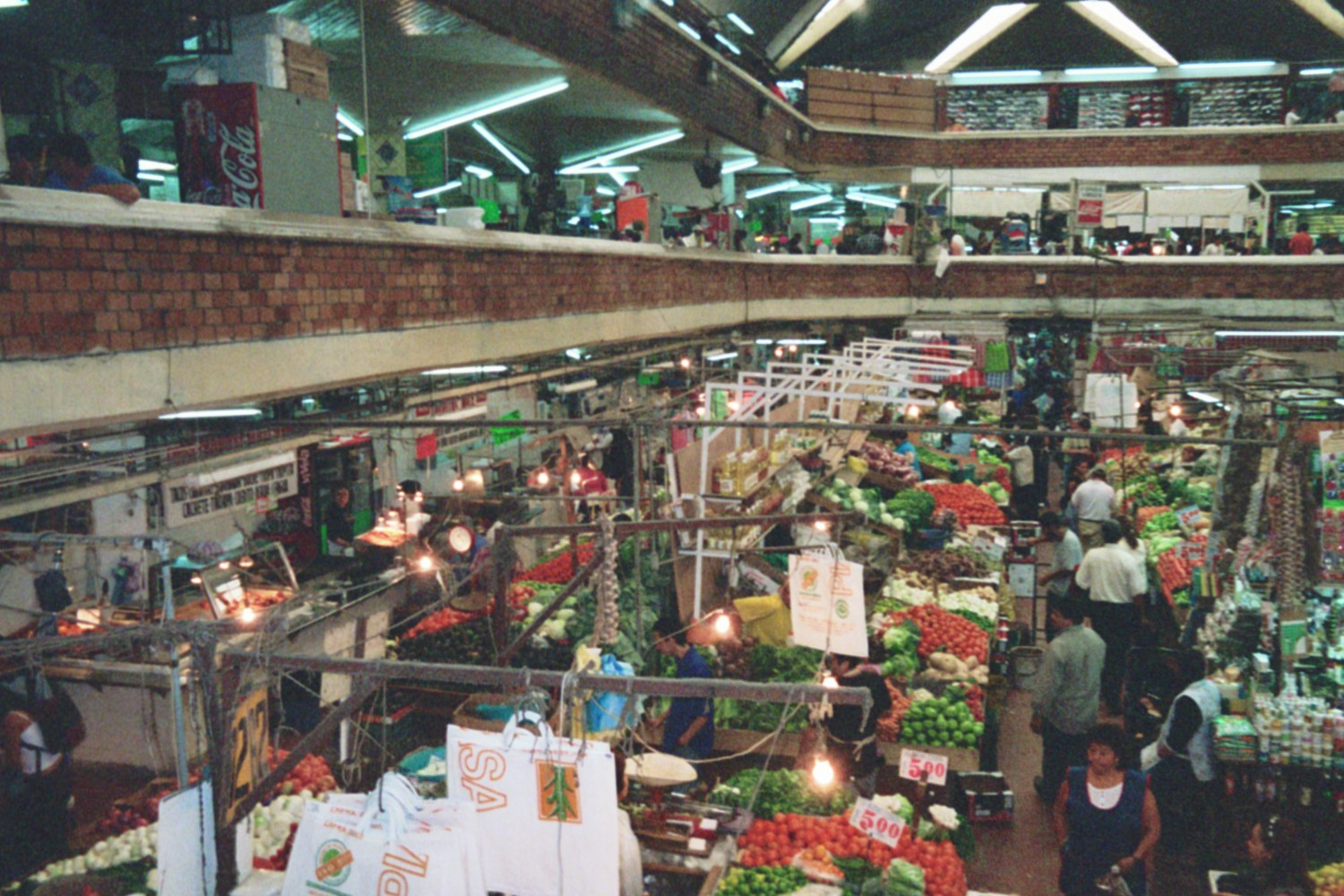
- Stalls in Juan de Dios Market
- Location: Avenida Javier Mina 47; Guadalajara, Jalisco, Mexico; 20°40′32″N 103°20′24″W
- Opening date: December 30, 1958; 67 years ago
- Architect: Alejandro Zohn
- Environment: Indoor
- Days normally open: Daily
- Total retail floor area: 40,000 m^{2} (430,000 ft^{2})
- Interactive map of San Juan de Dios Market

Mercado Libertad, better known as Mercado San Juan de Dios (San Juan de Dios Market) is located in the city of Guadalajara, Jalisco, Mexico. It is the largest indoor market in Latin America with an area of 40,000 m^{2} (430,000 ft^{2}).

== Description and history ==
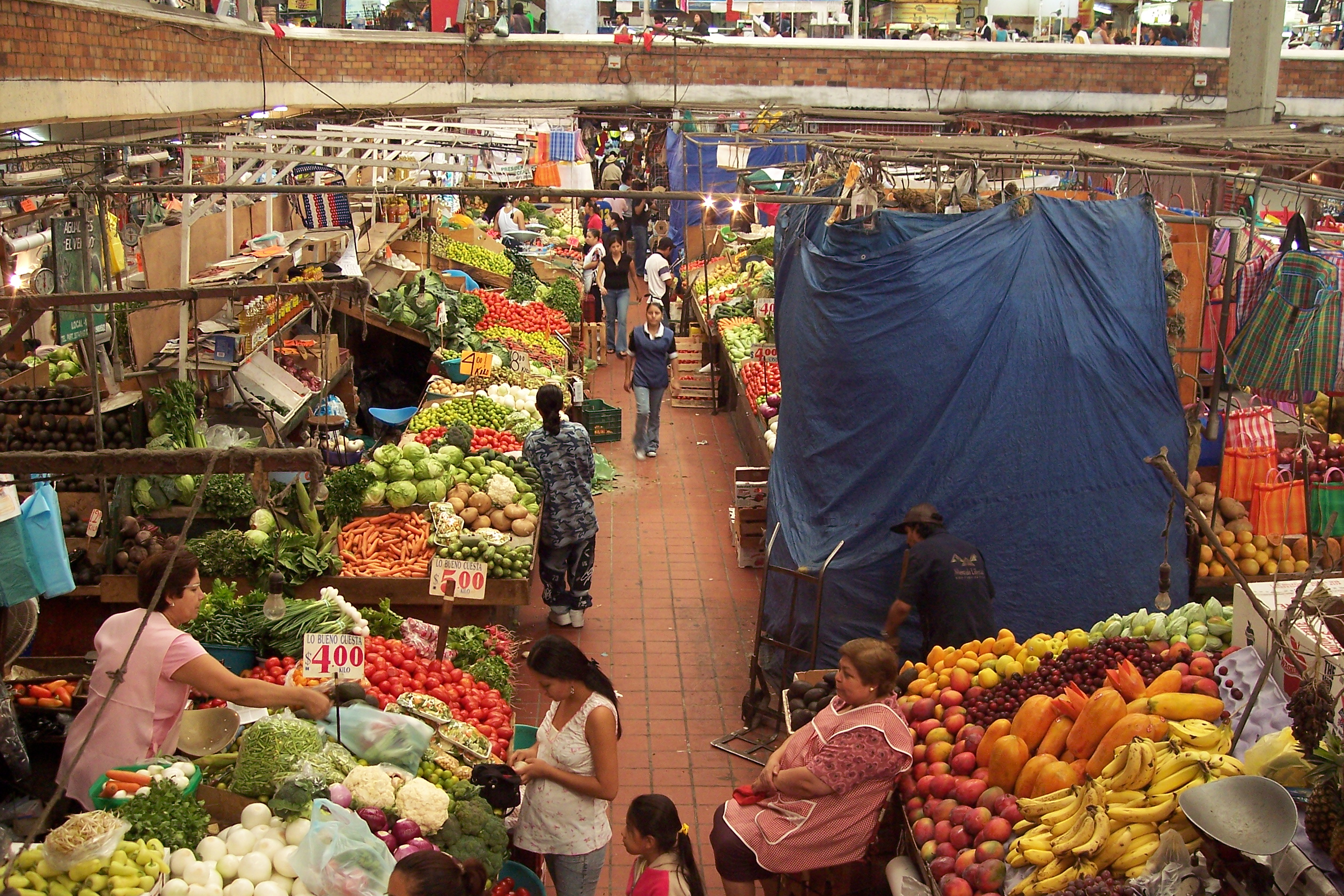
Grocery stalls

Most vendors in the market allow haggling, and many articles can be found at discounted prices. The market was inaugurated on December 30, 1958 and was designed by the architect Alejandro Zohn.

There are approximately 2,980 posts in the market, selling clothing, eyeglasses, shoes, movies, video games, CDs, electrical goods, and many other types of items. The lower level includes stands selling typical foods of Guadalajara, such as tortas ahogadas (sandwiches 'drowned' in sauce), perhaps the most typical dish from Jalisco, as well as tacos, pozole, and other foods.

The market has three levels and two parking lots. The first level has a section that includes stalls selling typical groceries and sweets as well as an area of stalls selling crafts. The second level includes small restaurants and food stalls selling typical Mexican dishes. The third level, the most recent addition, includes stalls selling imported goods, clothes, electronics, music, movies, computer equipment, paint, shoes, etc.

The market is open every day of the year and is visited by residents and tourists largely attracted by the craft stalls. The market was laid out so as to have each floor have a theme, i.e. a floor for jewelry, candy, crafts, huaraches, etc. and another just for food, and a third for imported goods.
