= Verdaguer station =

Metro station in Barcelona, Spain

Verdaguer
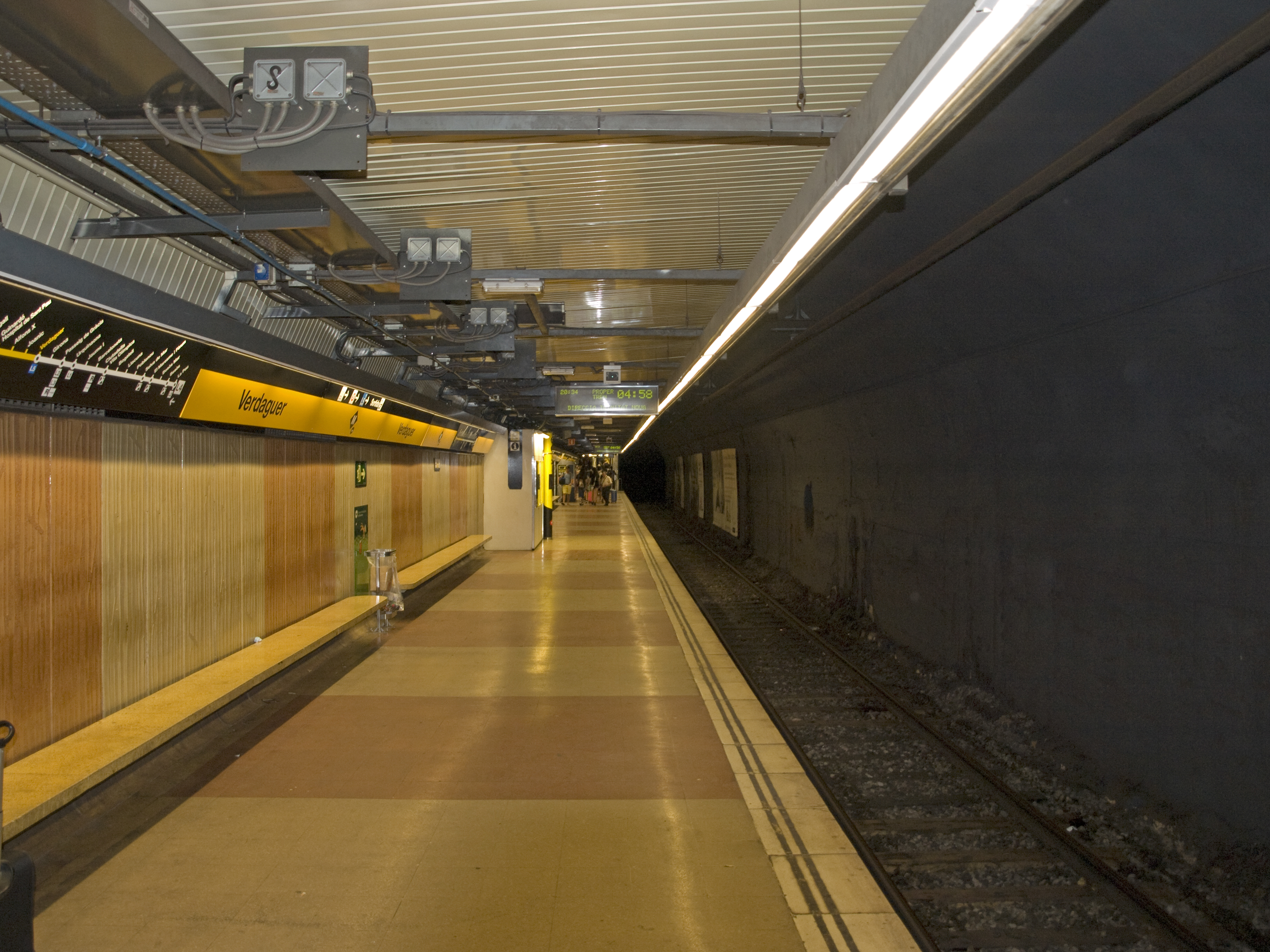
- Northbound platform on Line 4

General information
- Location: Barcelona (Eixample)
- Coordinates: 41°23′59″N 2°10′6″E
- System: Barcelona Metro rapid transit station Trambesòs tram stop
- Operator: Transports Metropolitans de Barcelona; TramMet

Other information
- Fare zone: 1 (ATM)

History
- Opened: 1970 (Line 5); 1973 (Line 4); 2024 (Tram)

Services
Preceding station	Metro	Following station
Joanic towards Trinitat Nova	L4	Girona towards La Pau
Preceding station	Metro	Following station
Diagonal towards Cornellà Centre	L5	Sagrada Família towards Vall d'Hebron
Location
- Location within Barcelona

Verdaguer (Catalan pronunciation: [bərdəˈɣe]) is a station in the Barcelona metro network located near Plaça de Mossèn Jacint Verdaguer, in the Eixample district. It is an important interchange station between Line 4 and Line 5.

Since 2024, Verdaguer is also a Tram stop. It was opened as part of the tram network's Diagonal extension and is served by line T4. It is the line's current terminus.

== Location ==
The station is located in the vicinity of the Plaça de Mossèn Jacint Verdaguer, in the Dreta de l'Eixample neighborhood of the Eixample district. The square, named after Catalan poet Jacint Verdaguer is found at the intersection of two major streets, Avinguda Diagonal and Passeig de Sant Joan.

The Line 4 platforms are located underground below Passeig de Sant Joan, between the streets of Provença and Rosselló. The station has an access in the middle of Passeig de Sant Joan. An underground transfer corridor allows connection to the Line 5 station.

The Line 5 platforms are located underground below Carrer de Provença, between the streets of Girona and Bailén. The station has two lobbies and three different accesses. The eastern lobby features one access at the intersection of Bailén and Provença and the connection corridor to Line 4. The western lobby features two accesses in Carrer de Girona, one of them at the intersection with Avinguda Diagonal.

The Tram stop is located in Avinguda Diagonal, between the streets of Girona and Bailén. The platforms are a short walk away from the Line 5 access in Avinguda Diagonal.

== History ==
The station initially opened as part of Line 5 in 1970 (56 years ago), as the line's section between Diagonal and Sagrera became operational.

The Line 4 station opened in 1973 (53 years ago) as the line opened between Joanic and Jaume I.

The station was initially known as General Mola, the name of the Passeig de Sant Joan during the Francoist dictatorship. The name was changed to the current Verdaguer in 1982.

In November 2024, the Tram stop was opened as part of the tram network's expansion along Avinguda Diagonal. It is the current terminus of the Trambesòs T4 line, as works to extend the line to Francesc Macià are expected to begin in the coming years.

Verdaguer is one of the last remaining stations in the Barcelona Metro network that isn't fully accessible to persons with reduced mobility. In 2025, works began to install elevators and make the station fully accessible.

== Gallery ==
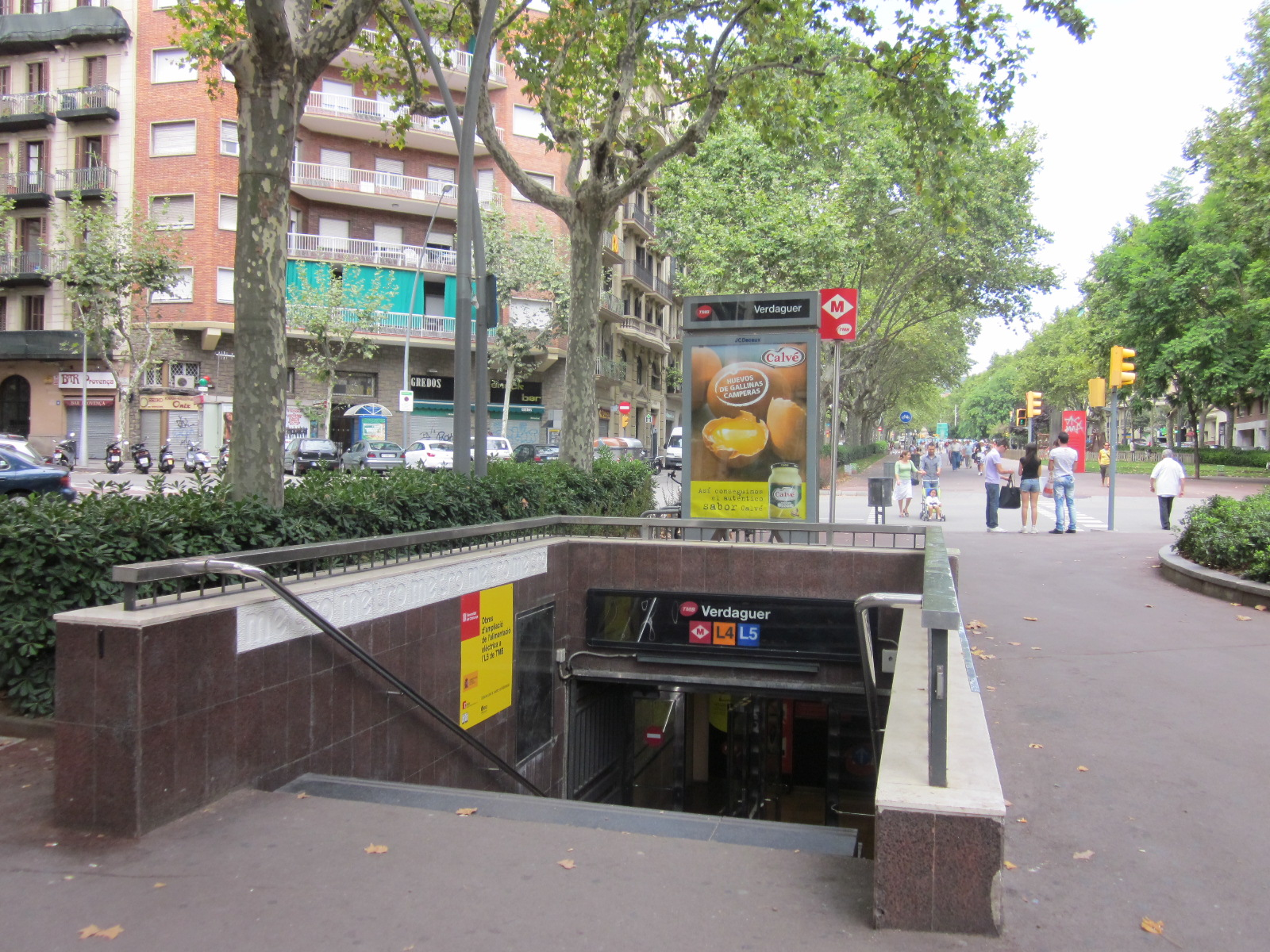
The Line 4 access in Passeig de Sant Joan

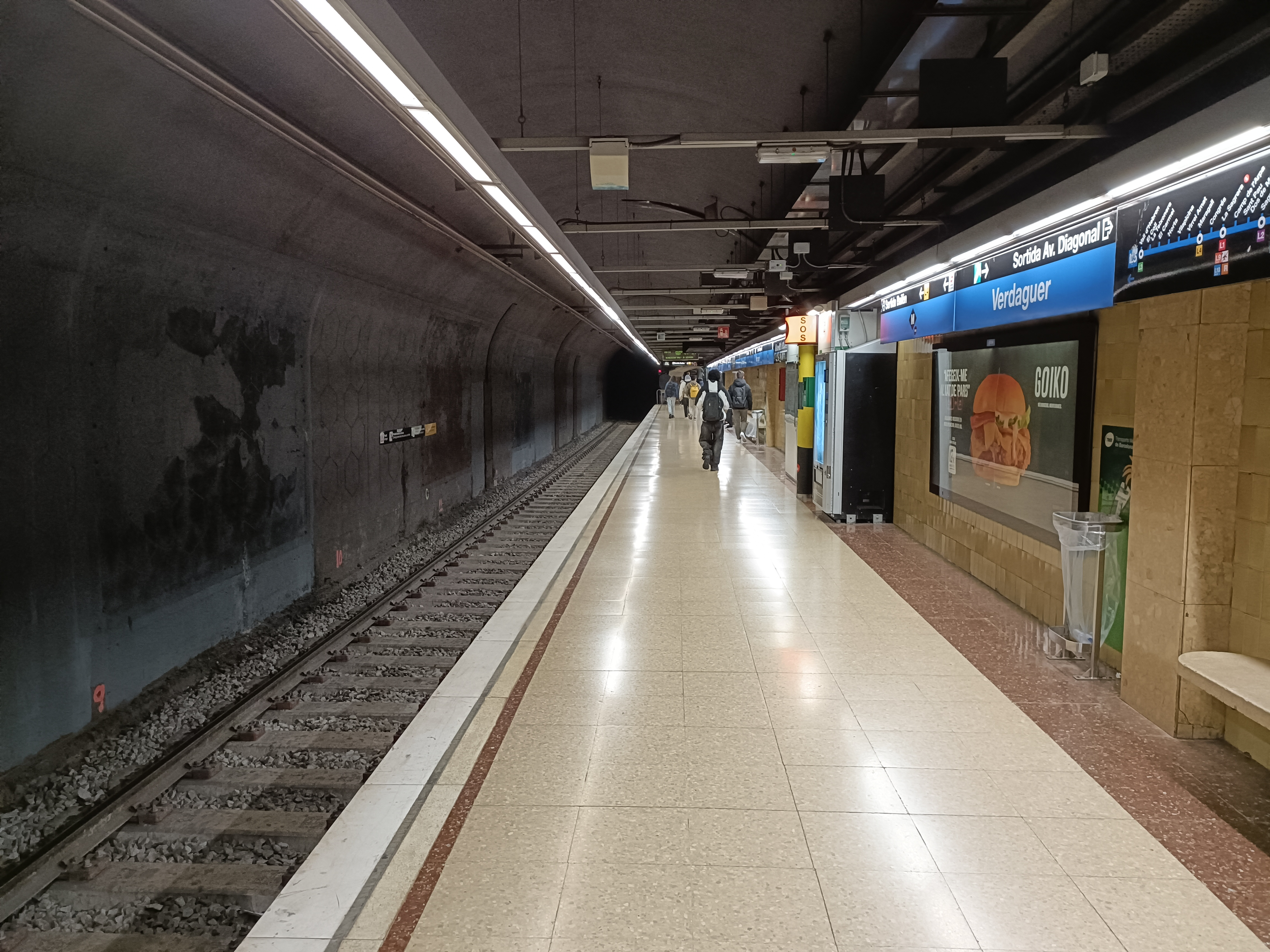
One of Line 5's platforms

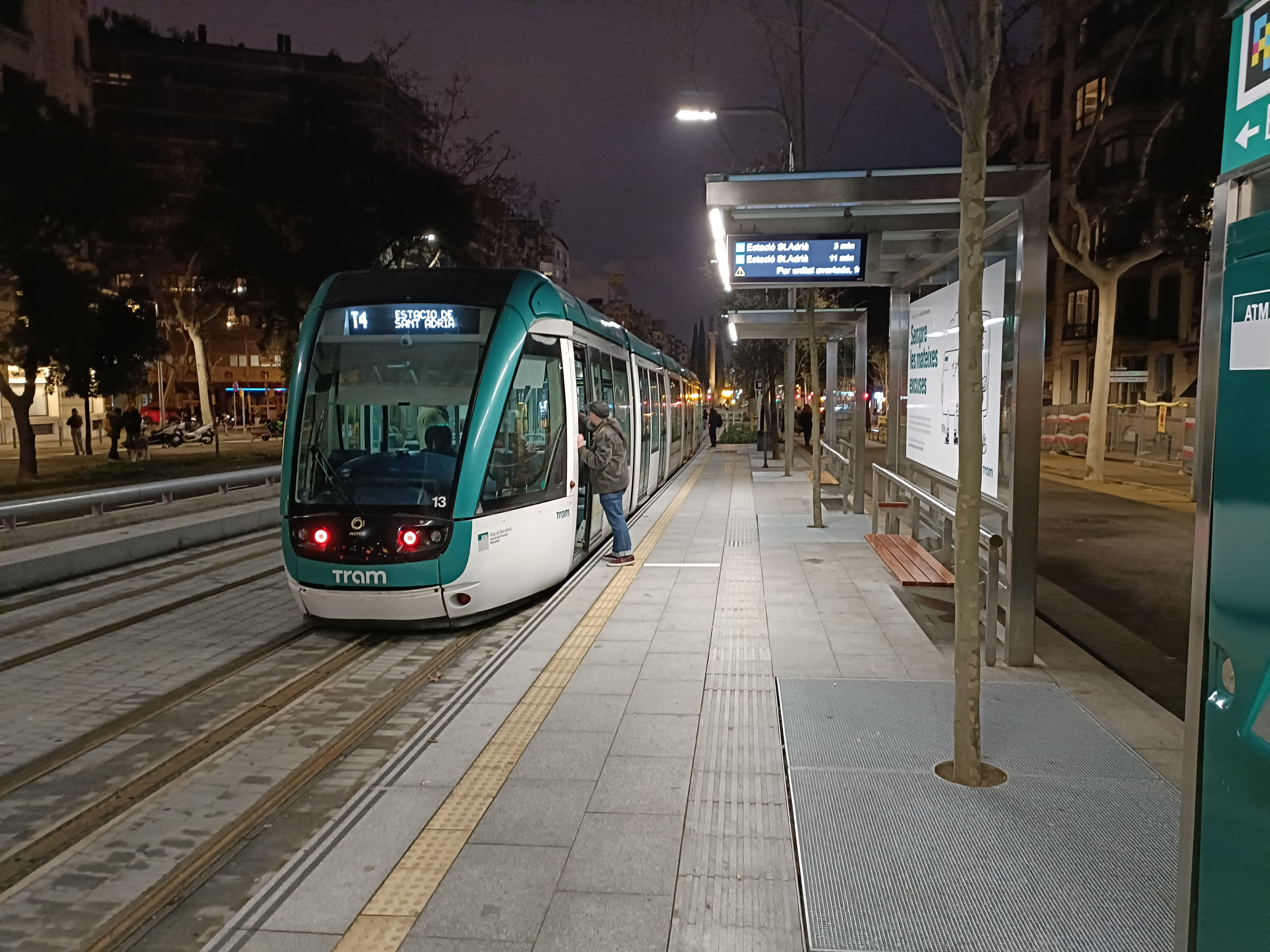
The current Trambesòs platform

== Services ==
Preceding station	Metro	Following station
Joanic towards Trinitat Nova	L4	Girona towards La Pau
Diagonal towards Cornellà Centre	L5	Sagrada Família towards Vall d'Hebron

== See also ==
- List of Barcelona Metro stations
