= Carrer d'Aragó, Barcelona =

Street in Barcelona, Catalonia, Spain

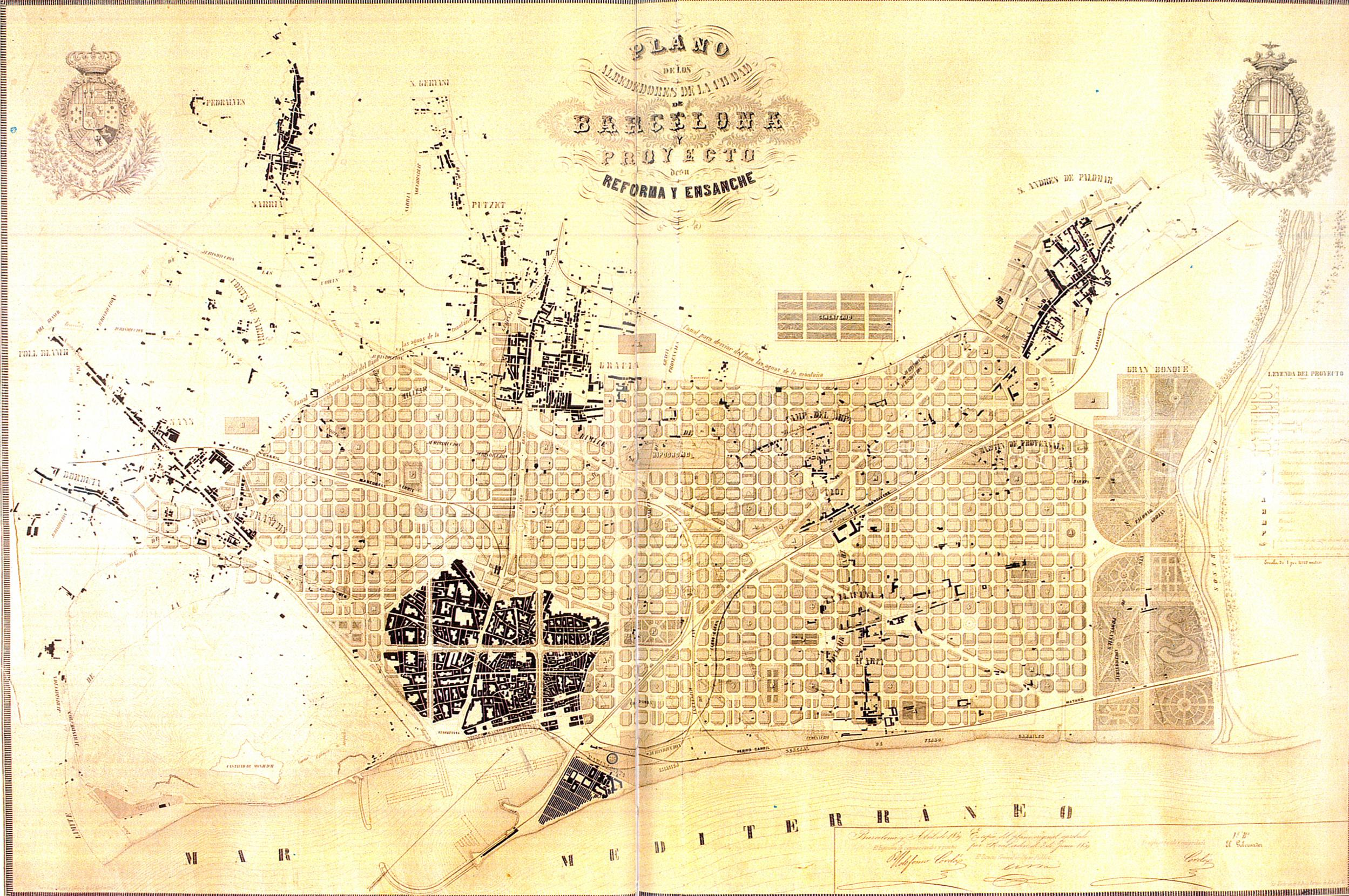
Original Eixample plan, 1859, drawn by Ildefons Cerdà i Sunyer.

Carrer d'Aragó is a major thoroughfare in Barcelona, one of the widest and busiest roads of the districts it cuts through, especially Eixample but also Sant Martí. Its creation was passed in 1863, and was part of Ildefons Cerdà's urban plan, appearing as L Street in 1867, even though that name was never approved. Instead, another name, a reference to the Crown of Aragon, was proposed in 1863 by Víctor Balaguer, who was commissioned by the city council to rename all the streets in the area. Its Spanish-language rendition, Calle de Aragón, was the official designation back then. It starts in Carrer de Tarragona and it becomes Rambla de Guipúscoa at the intersection with Carrer de Lope de Vega.

== Notable buildings ==
- Església de la Concepció. A Gothic church dating from the 13th to the 15th century originally located in Via Laietana (district of Ciutat Vella) and moved to Carrer d'Aragó in several stages from 1869 to 1879.
- Mercat de la Concepció - Eixample's oldest market, built on 1888 by Antoni Rovira i Trias.
- Eixample district council see, built in 1893 by Pere Falqués Urpí.

== Transport ==
=== Railway ===
From the 1930s to the 1950s, the street was crossed by trains on open-air railtracks. Nowadays there's an open railway station between the intersection of Aragó with Avinguda Meridiana and the one with Carrer del Clot called El Clot-Aragó.

=== Metro ===
On one hand, line L3 of the Barcelona Metro has two stations in different areas of Eixample: one is at the very beginning of the street, by Carrer de Tarragona, called Tarragona. The second one is Passeig de Gràcia, under the street of the same name. Its original name, however, was Aragón, and was a separate station in the metro network.

On the other hand, the eastern part of Carrer d'Aragó is the passageway though which L2 runs. Its stations include Clot, interconnected with El Clot-Aragó railway station, served by L1 and L2, and the L2-only stations Bac de Roda, Sant Martí and, if counting Rambla de Guipúscoa as part of the same road, also La Pau.

== See also ==
- List of streets and squares in Eixample, Barcelona
- List of streets and squares in Sant Martí, Barcelona
- Illa de la Discòrdia
- Rambla d'Aragó, Lleida
