= Girona station (Barcelona) =

Metro station in Barcelona, Spain

Coordinates: 41.3947°N 2.17111°E

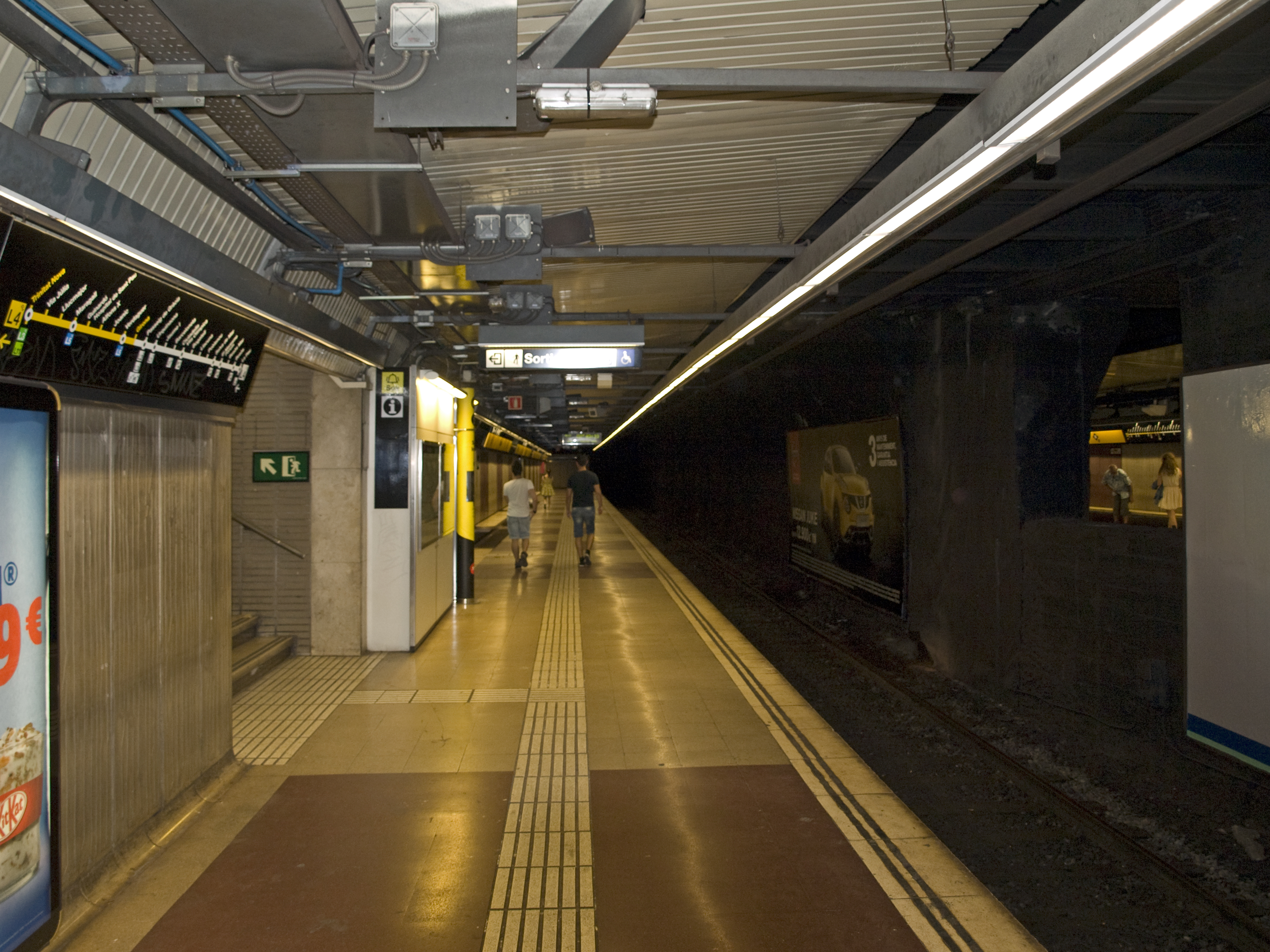
Platform at the station.

Girona (Catalan pronunciation: [ʒiˈɾonə]) is a Barcelona Metro station located in Carrer de Girona, underneath Carrer del Consell de Cent between Carrer del Bruc and Carrer de Bailèn, in Dreta de l'Eixample, part of the Eixample district of Barcelona, Catalonia, Spain. It is served by L4 (yellow line). The station was inaugurated in 1973 (53 years ago) along with the other stations from Urquinaona to Joanic.

== Services ==
Preceding station	Metro	Following station
Terminus	L4	Passeig de Gràcia towards La Pau

== See also ==
- List of Barcelona Metro stations
