= Barcelona Tourist Bus =

Tourist bus service

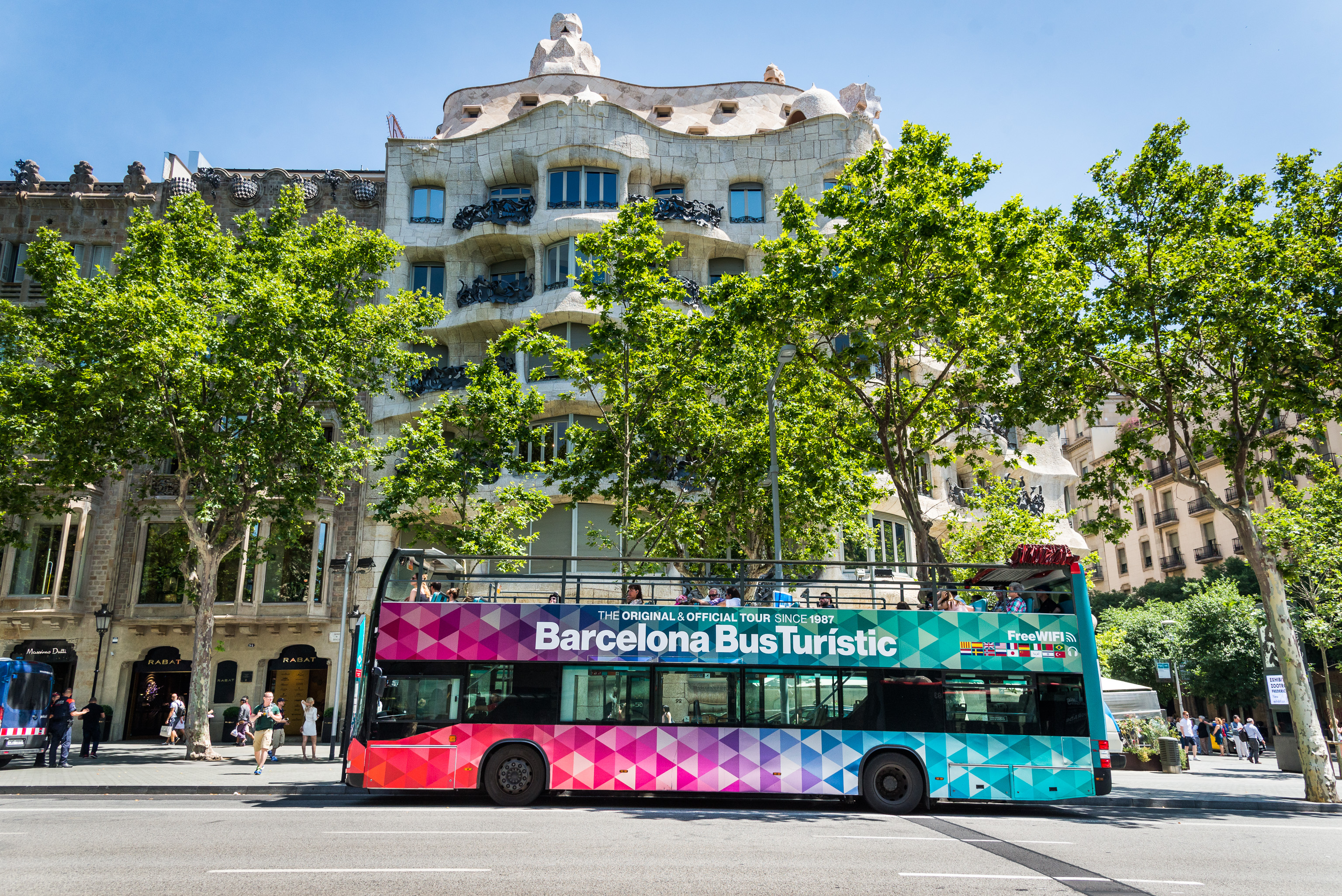
Barcelona Bus Turístic (Hop on hop off)

Barcelona Bús Turístic is a tourist bus service in the city of Barcelona, which in 2012 had 3 routes and a fleet of 74 buses. It is managed by the consortium of Turisme de Barcelona and TMB.

== History ==
The history of Barcelona's touristic bus began in the 1920s to the 1930s, when the bus company Roca and two other companies presented a new project to create a new touristic bus in the city. It is not until 1929, on the occasion of the World's Fair of 1929, that the General Company of Buses (CGA) and the National Tourist Board create two lines of tourist buses that originate in Barcelona, one that is said Interior Circuit and the other Great Circuit of Luxe that worked throughout the year of the exhibition. Soon the buses that served in this line were destined to the line MO Barcelona - Mollet (now exploited by Sagalés).

On June 25, 1987, again, 58 years later, under the name of "line 100 Discover Barcelona", only for the summer season. The first circulations were with two Pegaso Monotral 6038 buses, 6226 and 6042, equipped with air conditioning.

In 1992 the current brand was born, Barcelona Bus Turístic. The number of passengers and the fleet of buses progressively increases, which from 1996 would incorporate two-story vehicles.

It is in 1997, when the Tourist Bus was 10 years old since its birth, that many new features appeared: on March 22 it was put into operation, changing completely with new buses, and the ticket was created which served for two days. A year later, in 1998, a second line would open, the 101. Since then there were 2 lines: the L100, also called the South and the L101, the North. Shortly afterwards, in 2000, the period of service was extended throughout the year.

In 2002, to commemorate Year Gaudí, the Barcelona Bus Turístic adopted the name of Bus Gaudí.

In 2004, on the occasion of the Universal Forum of Cultures, a new line was created, the green route, which has gradually consolidated to date. In 2012, for example, it ran between March 30 and November 4.

In 2007, an audio guide was included on board for users, available in 10 languages: Catalan, Spanish, English, French, Italian, German, Russian, Japanese, Chinese and Portuguese.

== Routes ==
- Red Route: Sants railway station - Creu Coberta - Plaça d'Espanya - CaixaForum Barcelona - Poble Espanyol - MNAC - Anella Olímpica - Fundació Joan Miró - Montjuïc Cable Car - Miramar - Colom / Marítime Museum of Barcelona - Port Vell - Museu d 'History of Catalonia - Olympic Port - Bogatell Beach / Poblenou Cemetery - Parc de la Ciutadella / Zoo Barcelona - Pla de Palau - Gothic Quarter - Plaça de Catalunya - Casa Batlló / Fundació Antoni Tàpies - Passeig de Gràcia / La Pedrera - Francesc Macià / Diagonal.
- Blue Route: Monastery of Pedralbes - Palau Reial / Pavellons Güell- Futbol Club Barcelona - Francesc Macià / Diagonal - Eixample - MACBA / CCCB - Plaça de Catalunya - Casa Batlló / Fundació Tàpies - Passeig de Gràcia / La Pedrera - Sagrada Família - Gràcia - Park Güell / Tibidabo - Sarrià
- Green Route: Forum - Olympic Port - Bogatell Beach / Poblenou Cemetery - Poblenou - Diagonal Mar Park.

== Users ==
Evolution of total users over the 25 years of existence

| 1987 | 1988 | 1989 | 1990 | 1991 | 1992 | 1993 | 1994 | 1995 | 1996 |
| 11.357 | 10.223 | 21.832 | 23.754 | 66.016 | 86.145 | 10.1400 | 123.800 | 131.600 | 193.467 |
| 1997 | 1998 | 1999 | 2000 | 2001 | 2002 | 2003 | 2004 | 2005 | 2006 |
| 429.628 | 452.232 | 553.508 | 873.611 | 983.302 | 1.150.621 | 1.258.490 | 1.474.954 | 1.654.145 | 1.881.125 |
| 2007 | 2008 | 2009 | 2010 | 2011 | 2012 | 2013 | 2014 | 2015 | 2016 |
| 2.181.599 | 2.076.785 | 1.913.419 | 1.925.226 | 2.125.960 | 1.946.907 | 1.994.345 | | | |
