= Urquinaona station =

Metro station in Barcelona, Spain

Urquinaona
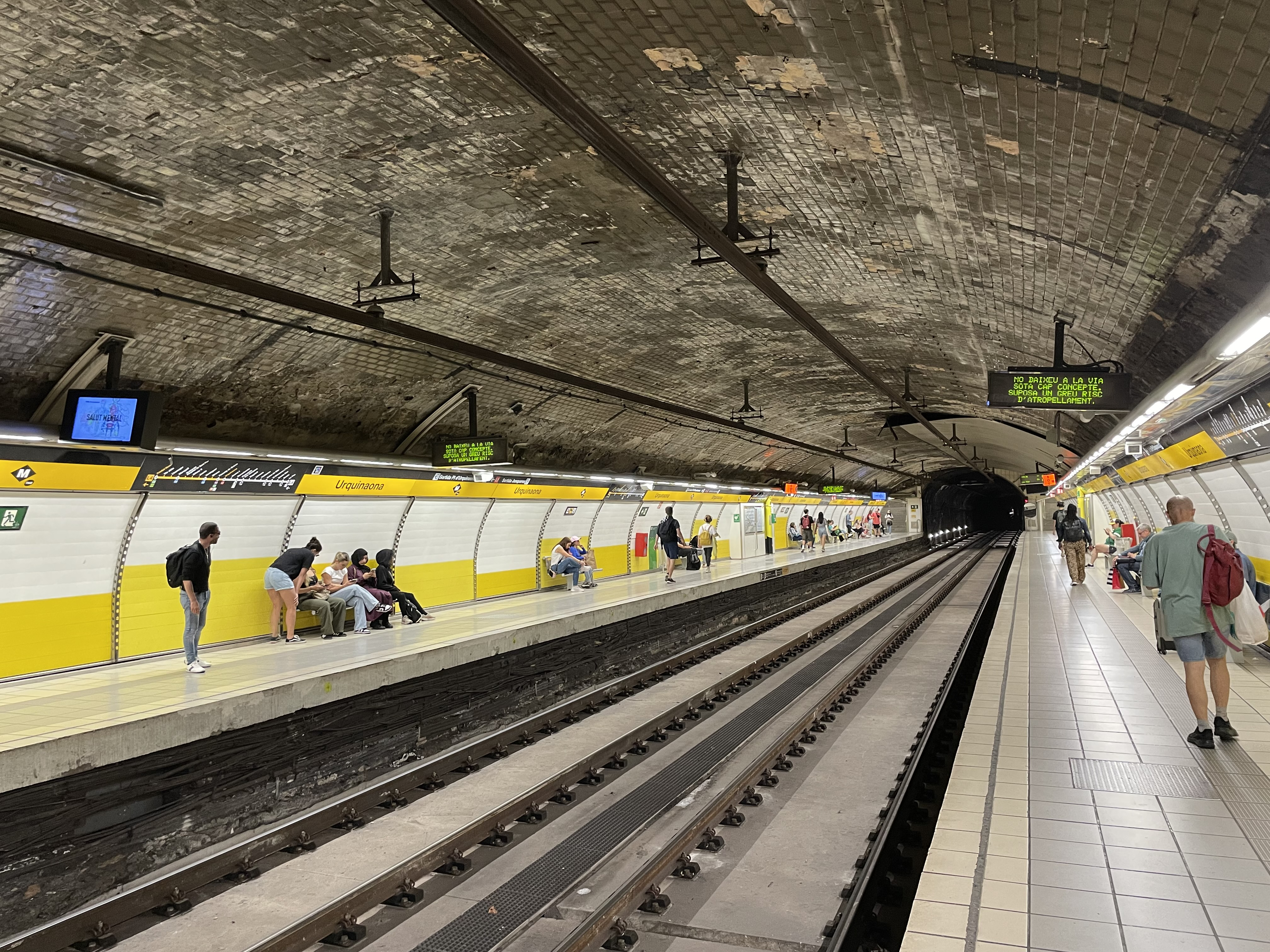
- L4 platforms

General information
- Location: Barcelona
- Coordinates: 41°23′21″N 2°10′24″E
- System: Barcelona Metro rapid transit station
- Owner: Transports Metropolitans de Barcelona

Construction
- Structure type: Underground

Other information
- Fare zone: 1 (ATM)

History
- Opened: 1926; 100 years ago

Services
Preceding station	Metro	Following station
Catalunya towards Hospital de Bellvitge	L1	Arc de Triomf towards Fondo
Passeig de Gràcia towards Trinitat Nova	L4	Jaume I towards La Pau
Location
- Location within Barcelona Location within Spain

Urquinaona (Catalan pronunciation: [urkinəˈonə]) is a station in the Barcelona Metro network, served by TMB lines L1 and L4. One of the metro stations in the city centre, and one of the busiest, it is located underneath Ronda de Sant Pere and Via Laietana, next to Plaça Urquinaona - after which it is named - in the Eixample. It can be accessed from Plaça Urquinaona and Via Laietana. In 2024, it was the ninth most used station on the network with over 8 million travellers.

The part of the station serving line L4 was opened in 1926 as part of what was then line 3, as a part of the stretch between Passeig de Gràcia and Jaume I. The stretch was later extended to Barceloneta, and in 1973 was made a part of L4. The line L1 platforms were opened in 1932, as a part of the section between Catalunya and Arc de Triomf section.

The L1 platforms are oriented from west to east and located under Ronda de Sant Pere. They have three vestibules, two at the eastern side (Plaça Urquinaona) and one at the western side. The transfer to L4 is made through the eastern vestibule, which also serves as the northern vestibule of the L4 platforms. At the lower track level, there are two side platforms approximately 100 metres (330 ft) long each. The tracks served by these platforms are separated from each other by the through tracks of the ADIF line linking Plaça de Catalunya and Arc de Triomf stations, although these are hidden from the platforms by intermediate walls.

The L4 platforms are oriented from north to south and located in the meridional direction (north-south). They have vestibules at both ends, the northern one leading to Plaça Urquinaona and the southern one to Via Laietana. The station has two side platforms, each of them 97 metres (318 ft) long.

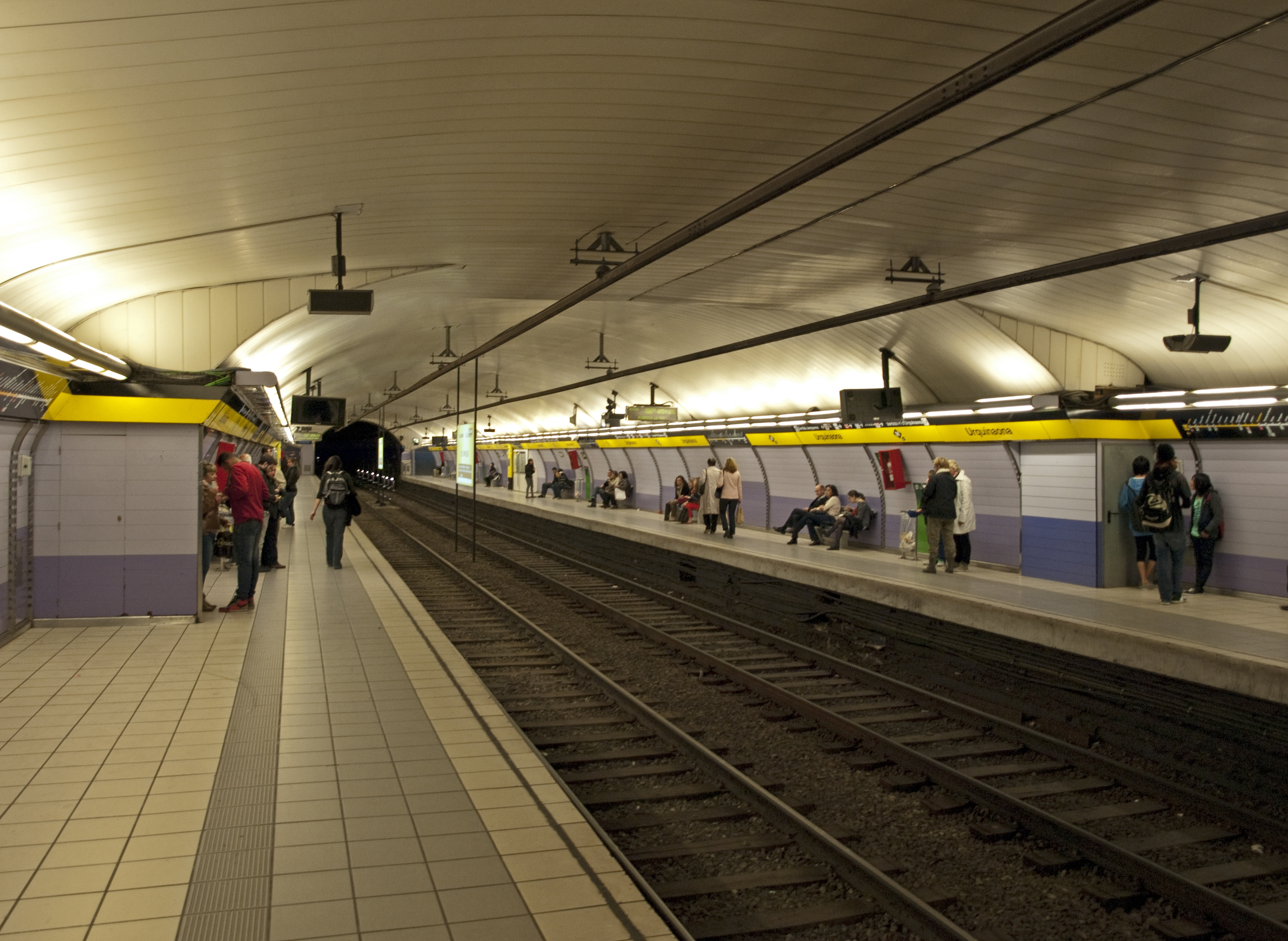
Panorama of L4 platforms

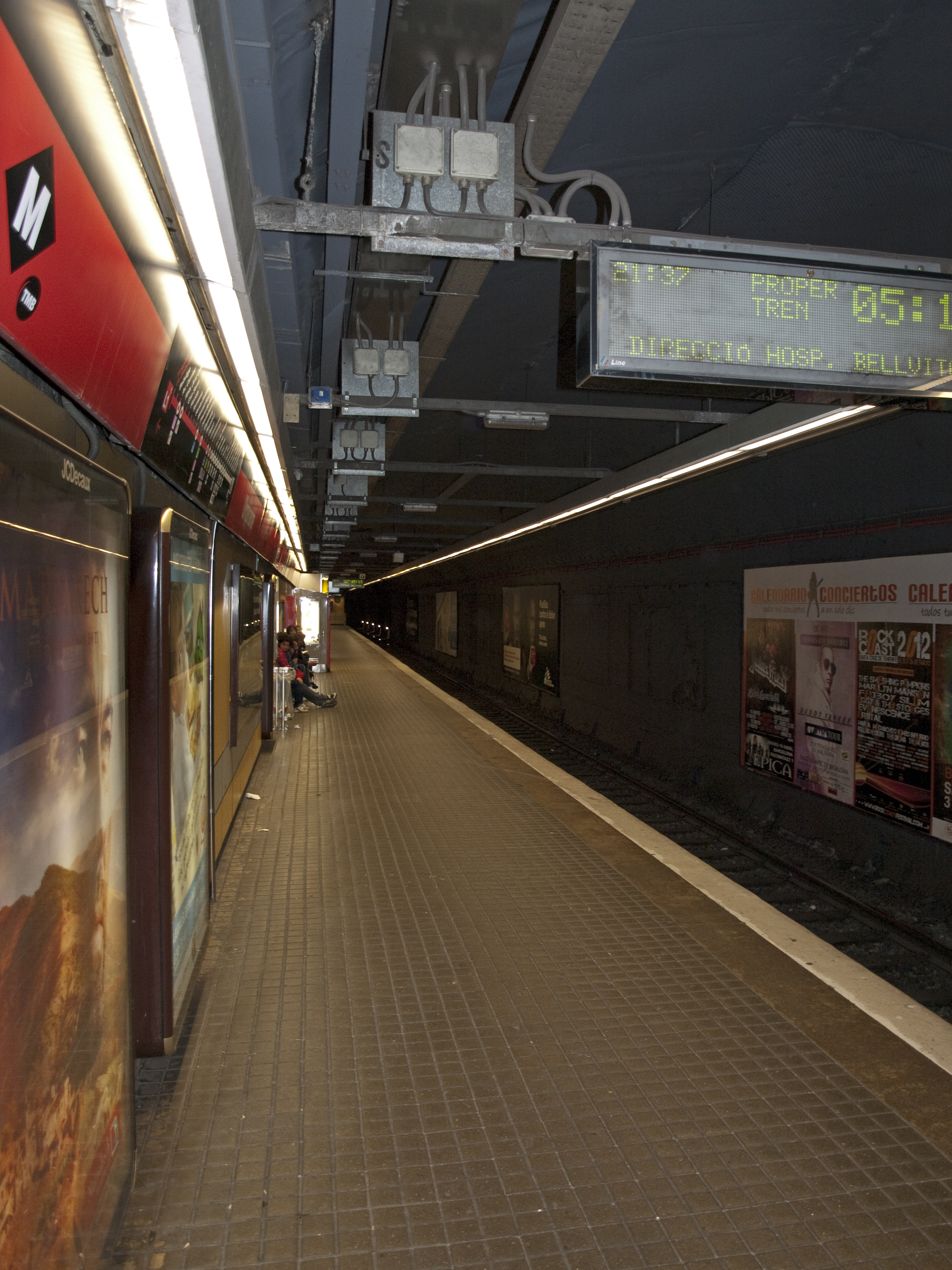
Westbound L1 platform

== See also ==
- List of Barcelona Metro stations
