= Barcelona Metro line VI =

The line VI of the Barcelona Metro network was an ambitious 1965 project for a proposed underground railway line in the city of Barcelona. The line would have stretched from the Zona Franca towards Plaça de Francesc Macià (then known as Calvo Sotelo), and from there into Travessera de Gràcia, Glòries, the Besòs River area, northern Badalona, and Montigalà in Santa Coloma de Gramenet. This very costly project was progressively abandoned: first, in 1984, by shortening the line. Later, in 1996, a new plan was devised for the city's public transport infrastructures. In 2001 yet another plan (PDI) was put forward, discarding the line, and proposing other transport projects instead.

The different projects devised by Francoist Spain during the 1960s were very ambitious. Plaça de Francesc Macià was in contemporaneous plans an important transport hub with other (later discontinued) projected metro lines. As of 2009, both the 22@ and Francesc Macià areas have no metro service, but the projected extension of line L8 and the construction of L9 and L10 follow it very closely.

== See also ==
- Desarrollismo
- List of Barcelona Metro stations
- List of proposed Barcelona Metro lines
