= Plaça de Mossèn Jacint Verdaguer, Barcelona =

Square in Barcelona

Coordinates: 41.399139°N 2.16992°E

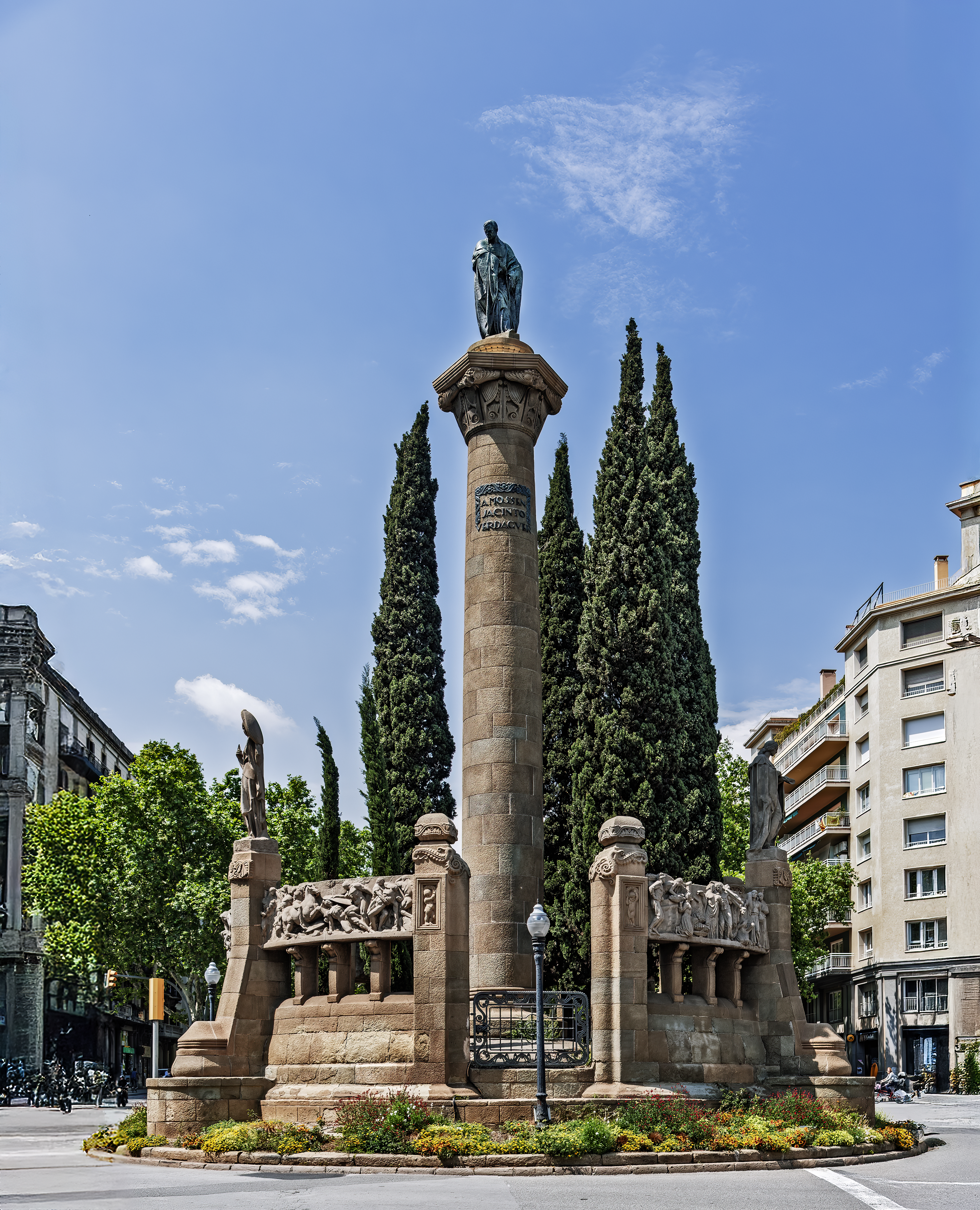
Jacint Verdaguer monument on the square

Plaça de Mossèn Jacint Verdaguer (Catalan pronunciation: [ˈplasə ðə muˈsɛɲ ʒəˈsim bərdəˈɣe]; colloquially Plaça Verdaguer or simply Verdaguer) is a square in the Eixample district of Barcelona, Catalonia, Spain. It lies in the intersection between Avinguda Diagonal, the city's main avenue, and Passeig de Sant Joan, in Dreta de l'Eixample, not far from the Sagrada Família.

It is named after the 19th century Catalan-language epic poet Jacint Verdaguer, and is crowned by a noucentista monument made in 1912 by Joan Borrell of Verdaguer on top of a column and monumental construction designed by the architect Josep Maria Pericàs with Borrell's allegories of poetry. The bas-reliefs around the monument, featuring scenes from Verdaguer's works, particularly L'Atlàntida, were sculpted by the brothers Llucià and Miquel Oslé. The current Catalan name of the square was approved in 1980, merely changing it from the Spanish version: Jacinto Verdaguer.

== Barcelona Metro ==
The Barcelona Metro station Verdaguer is immediately next to the square, and is served by lines L4 and L5.

== See also ==
- List of streets and squares in Eixample, Barcelona
- Urban planning of Barcelona
