= Barcelona Metro Diagonal line =

The Diagonal line of the Barcelona Metro network was a proposed underground railway service in the Spanish city of Barcelona. The proposal was made by Transports Metropolitans de Barcelona (TMB) between 1989 and 1992. It would have been a line crossing the city's most important avenue, Avinguda Diagonal, from southwest to northeast, through central Barcelona. However, the project was finally abandoned.

As of 2009 the current project to link the two main modern tram systems (Trambaix and Trambesòs) through Avinguda Diagonal may be considered its successor, even though the exact location of the stations and the nature of the tram system to be used have not been finalized.

== Stations never built ==
Many of the stations numbered in this project would have been connection stations with other than existing or projected metro services, although a number of these stations were never built as such and are only part of this project. Also, other stations became instead part of the tram networks. These are:

- Econòmiques - A Line 9 station will be roughly in the same location.
- Pius XII - Currently a Trambaix station.
- Numància - Currently a Trambaix station.
- Ganduxer -
- Francesc Macià - Currently a Trambaix terminus station. It will become part of Line 8, and was part of the project called line VI-
- Muntaner
- Balmes
- Llúria
- Nàpols
- Bilbao
- Pere IV - Currently a Trambesòs station.
- Josep Pla

== See also ==
- List of proposed Barcelona Metro lines
- Disused Barcelona Metro stations
