= La Verneda i la Pau =

Coordinates: 41°25′48.64″N 2°12′35.57″E

- Neighbourhood of Barcelona
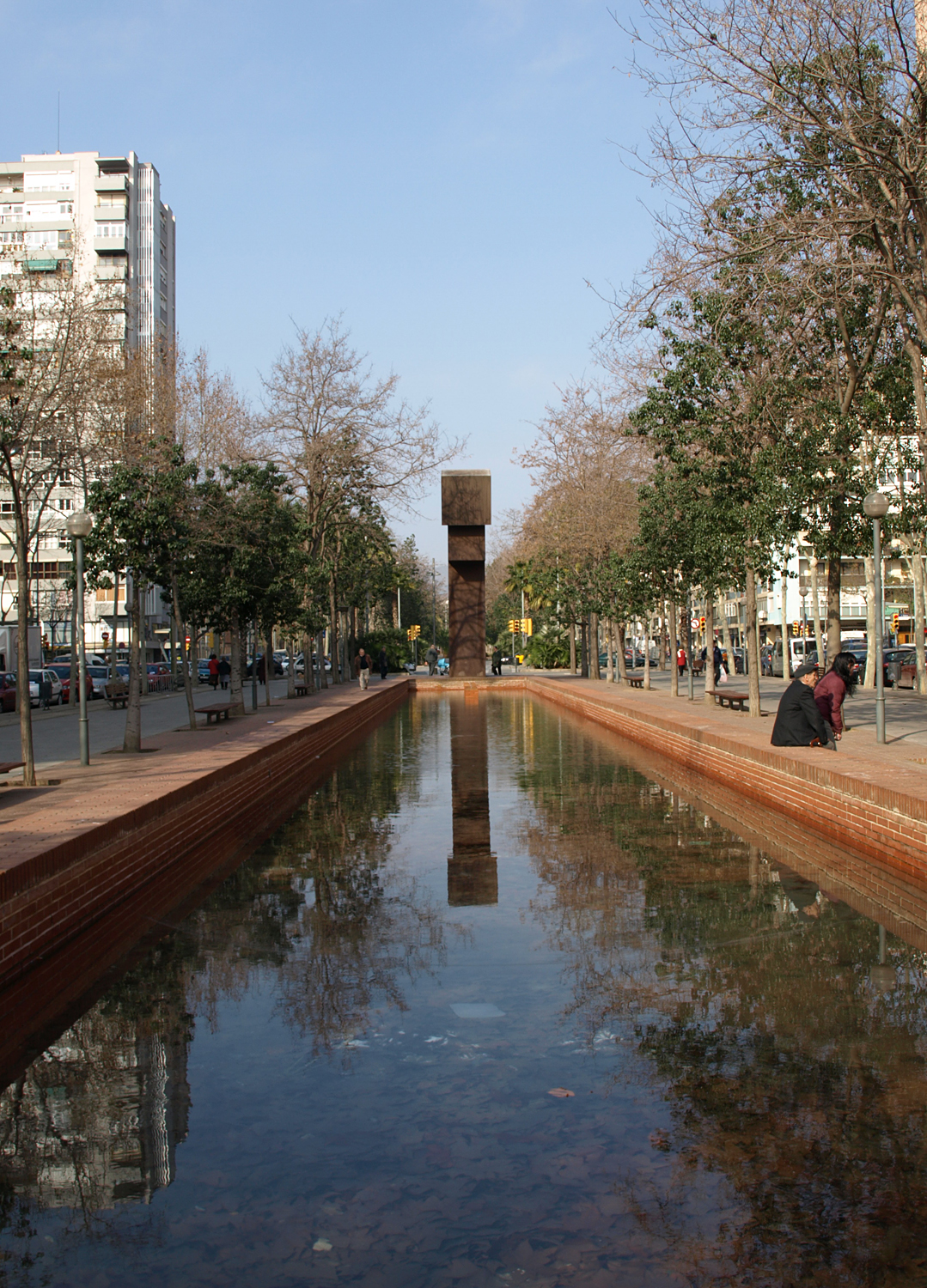
- View of El llarg viatge by Francesc Torres i Monsó, along the Rambla de Prim
- Interactive map of La Verneda i la Pau
- Country: Spain
- Autonomous Community: Catalonia
- Province: Barcelona
- Comarca: Barcelonès
- Municipality: Barcelona
- District: Sant Martí

Area
  - Total: 1.114 km^{2} (0.430 sq mi)
- Elevation: 12 m (39 ft)

Population
  - Total: 29,250
  - Density: 26,260/km^{2} (68,000/sq mi)

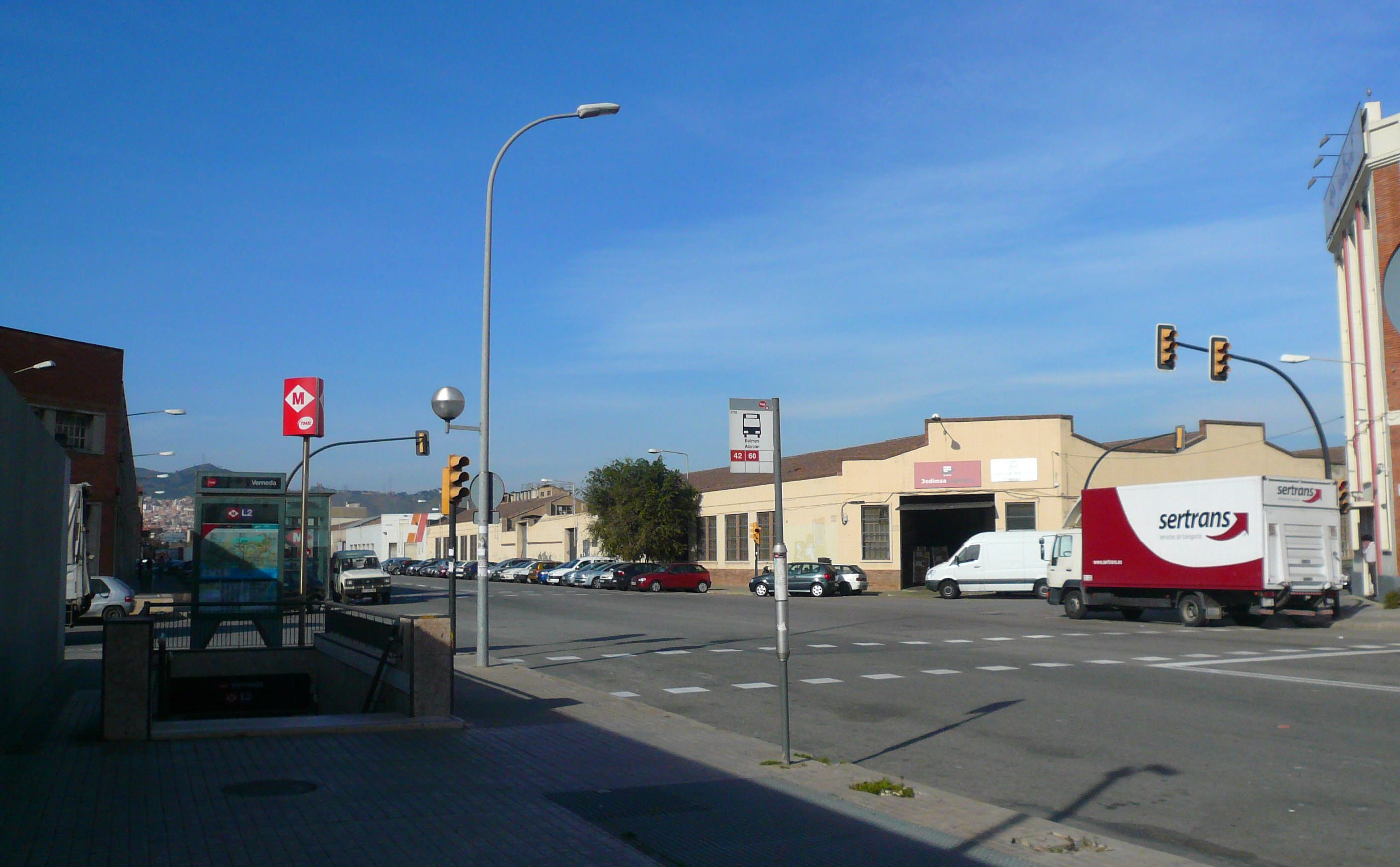
Verneda station of Barcelona metro, which is very close to the La Verneda neighborhood.

La Verneda i la Pau (Catalan pronunciation: [lə βərˈnɛðəj lə ˈpaw]) is the northernmost neighborhood of the Sant Martí district of Barcelona, Catalonia (Spain). It borders the neighboring municipality of Sant Adrià de Besòs.

Until the 1950s, most of its area was occupied by fields with some masies (such as Can Planas, Ca l'Arnó, Can Riera or Can Cadena) spread over it.

Like most of Barcelona's suburbs, such as L'Hospitalet de Llobregat, Badalona, Santa Coloma de Gramenet or Sant Adrià de Besòs, La Verneda also saw a dramatic population increase during the following years (specially in the 1960s), resulting in a rapid construction of significantly high buildings and a lack of basic services. The latter situation was partially reversed during the following decades due to continued demanding from residents associations.

There is only one metro station located inside the neighborhood limits, La Pau, but there are also some nearby stations frequently used by La Verneda inhabitants, such as Sant Martí, Besòs and Verneda (though the latter is located not only outside La Verneda neighborhood but also in another municipality: Sant Adrià de Besòs).
