= Jaume I station =

Metro station in Barcelona, Spain

Coordinates: 41°23′2″N 2°10′44″E

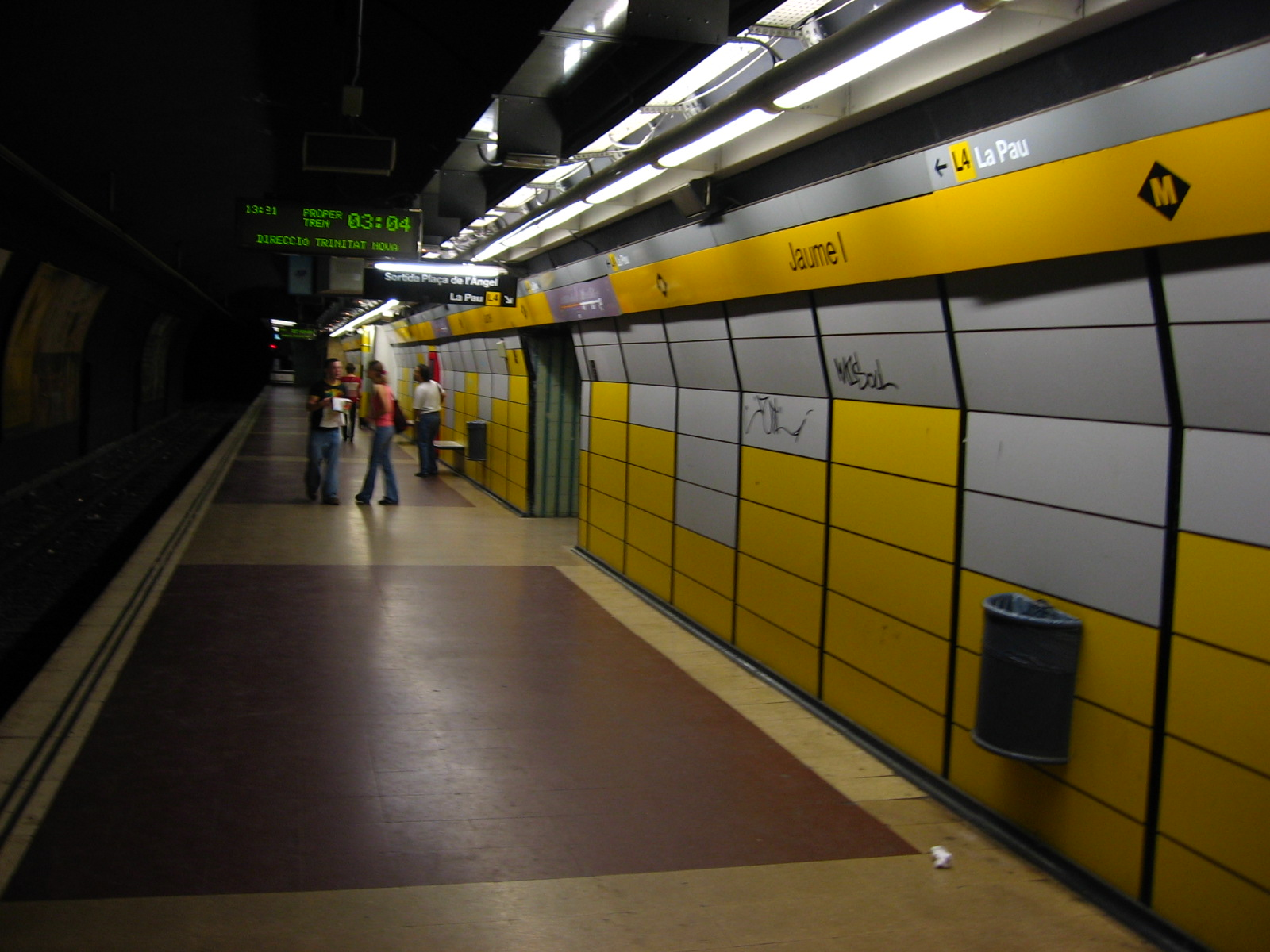
Trinitat Nova platform of Jaume I metro station

Jaume I (Catalan pronunciation: [ˈʒawmə pɾiˈme]) is a station in the Barcelona Metro network, located under Via Laietana, an important avenue in Ciutat Vella, right between Plaça de Ramon Berenguer el Gran and Plaça d'Emili Vilanova. It can be accessed from Plaça de l'Àngel and Carrer d'Argenteria, on the other side of Via Laietana.

The station serves Transports Metropolitans de Barcelona-operated L4. It began in 1926 (100 years ago) as part of the L3 service; later, a section of the L3 became the L4. The other L3 stations (Correos and Banco) that were located in Via Laietana are now closed.

Atypical of downtown Barcelona metro stations, its two platforms are on the same level, and divide the station into two parts. Each platform is 94 m (308 ft) long.

On December 28, 2018, the station became accessible for wheelchair users.

== Services ==
Preceding station	Metro	Following station
Urquinaona towards Trinitat Nova	L4	Barceloneta towards La Pau

== See also ==
- James I of Aragon, its namesake.
- List of Barcelona Metro stations
- List of disused Barcelona Metro stations
