= Travessera de Gràcia =

Coordinates: 41°24′08″N 2°09′34″E

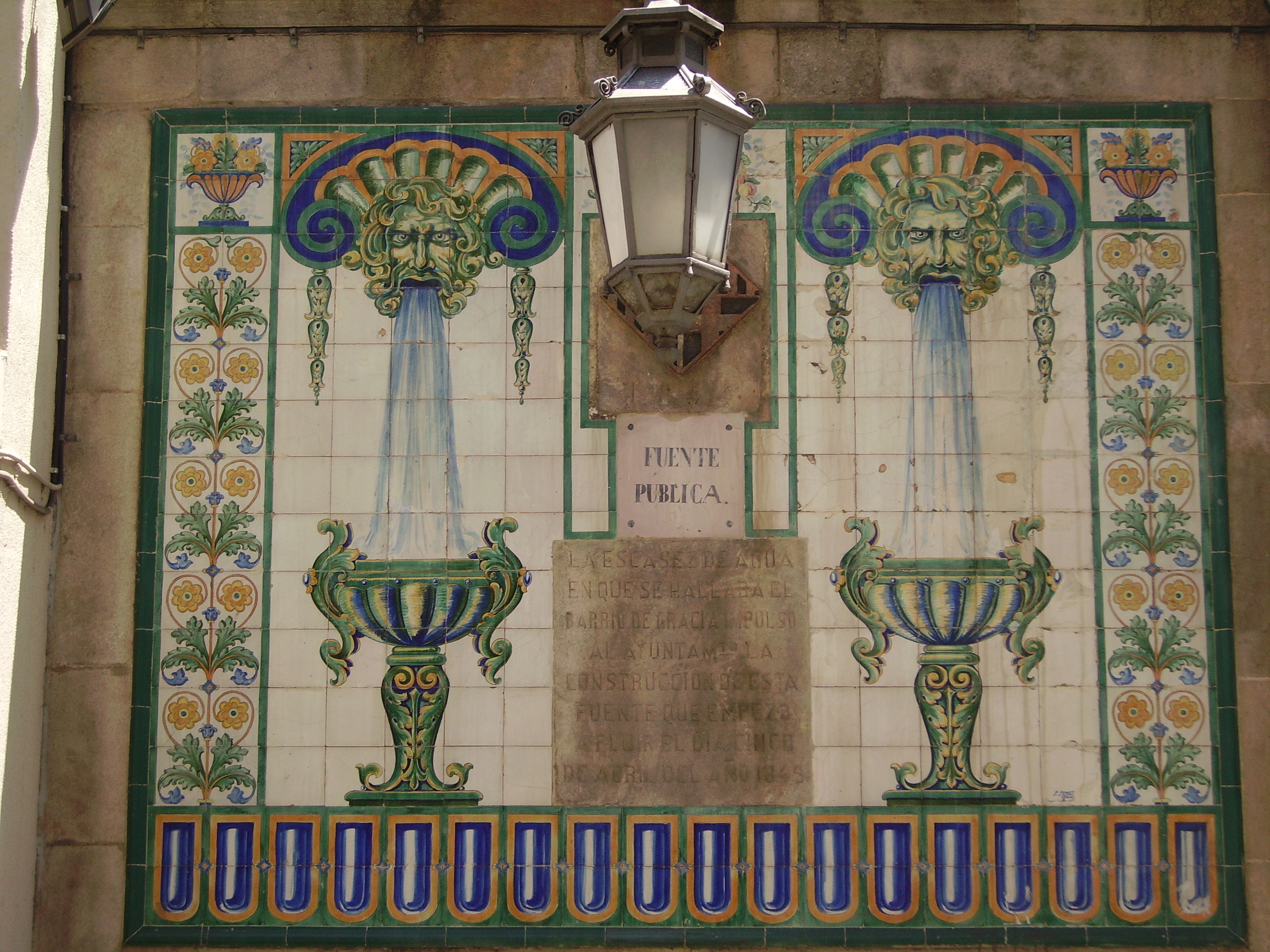
Tiles on a fountain in Travessera de Gràcia.

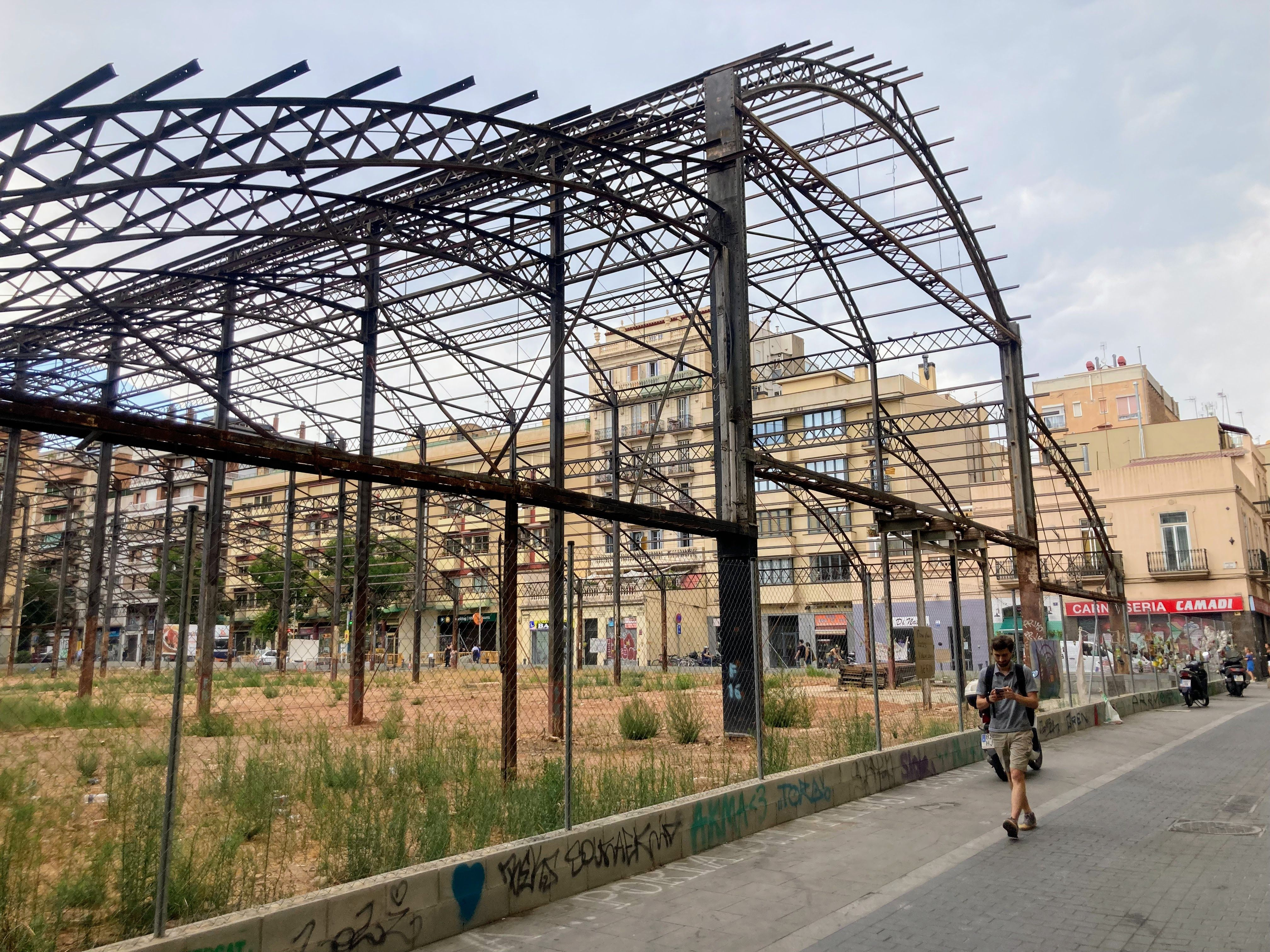
Mercat de l'abaceria Central

Travessera de Gràcia is a street in Barcelona named after Gràcia, a district it crosses, even though it also spans two other districts. It starts in Plaça de Francesc Macià in Sarrià-Sant Gervasi and ends in Carrer de Cartagena in Horta-Guinardó, where one of the landmarks of the city, the Hospital de Sant Pau stands. Its central part follows the outline of a medieval road, Via Francisca, documented in 1057. Its current name was approved in 1932. Before 1867, it was known as Travesera, with the older spelling and no reference to the neighbourhood, since Gràcia was an independent village. The street's other names include Orden and Solar. One of the main markets of the city in its heyday was also on this street: Mercat de l'Abaceria Central, which opened in 1892.

In Travessera de Gràcia number 9 are the headquarters of perfume and fashion company Puig.

== Transport ==
- Gràcia station, on FGC and Barcelona Metro networks, on Plaça de Gal·la Placídia.
- The part of the street in Vila de Gràcia near Mercat de l'Abaceria is best accessed from Barcelona Metro station Joanic.
- The Trambaix station Francesc Macià is on one end of the street. A Barcelona Metro station called Hospital de Sant Pau is near the opposite end.

== See also ==
- List of streets and squares in Gràcia
