= Francesc Macià station =

Tram station in Barcelona, Spain

Coordinates: 41.3922°N 2.1432°E

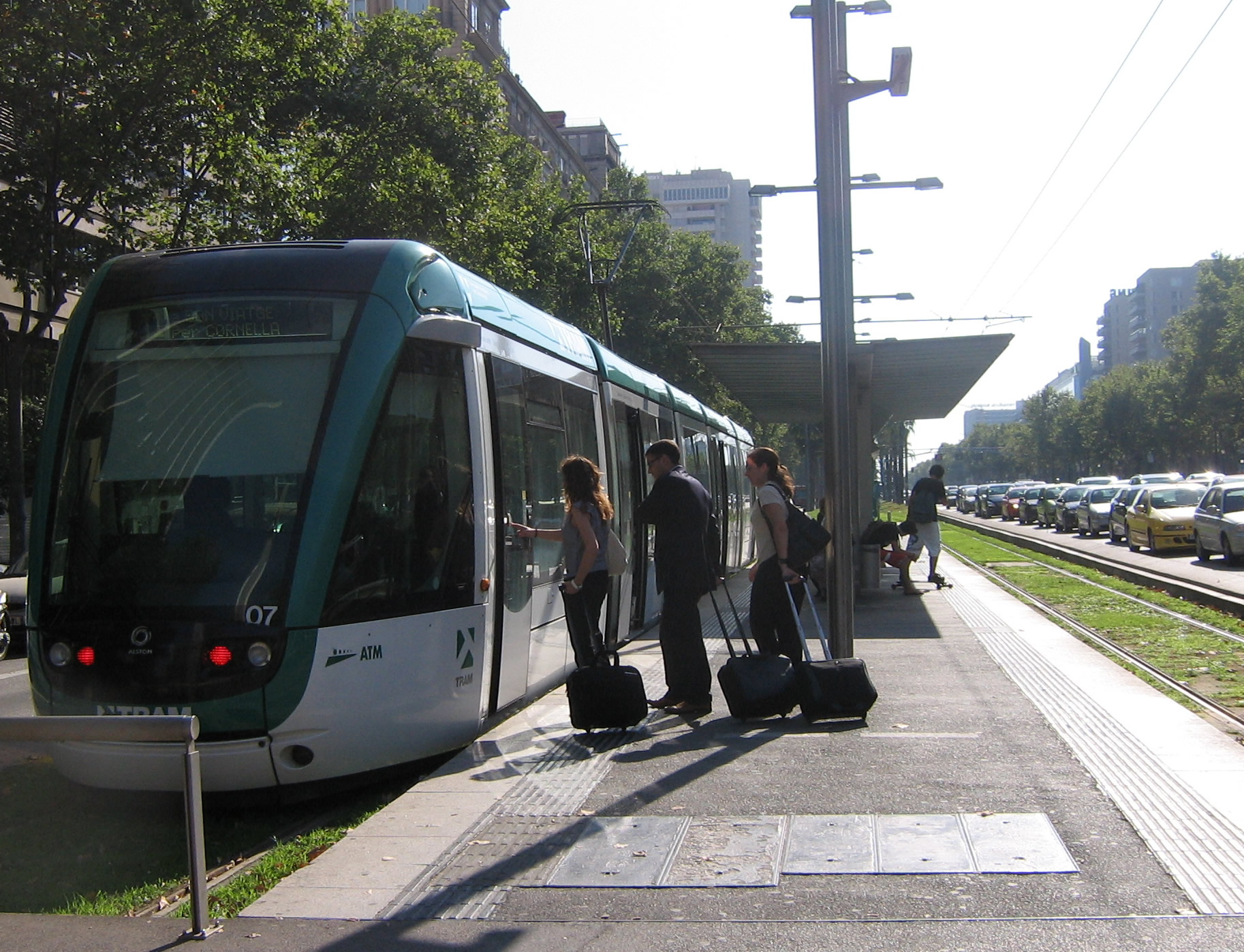
Francesc Macià station

Francesc Macià (Catalan pronunciation: [fɾənˈsɛzɡ məsiˈa]) is a Trambaix station and a projected metro station located in the Plaça de Francesc Macià, Barcelona, crossed by the Avinguda Diagonal, in the Sarrià-Sant Gervasi district. This stop is the terminal for the three Trambaix routes (T1, T2 and T3).

Also it is planned to be a Barcelona Metro station, which is due to be served by Ferrocarrils de la Generalitat de Catalunya (FGC) L8, as part of the station's enlargement towards Gràcia. It would be located on the Plaça de Francesc Macià, in the district of Sarrià-Sant Gervasi. Since this area is one of the few left without a direct metro connection after the completion of L9 and L10, it has been demanded by the neighbours and has featured in some of the ambitious proposals for transportation in the city since the 1960s. Namely in the projects for a line VI and for a Diagonal line.

The current project to extend Line 8 of the Barcelona Metro will provide an interchange with the Trambaix tram system, as an intermediate station in a route connecting Plaça d'Espanya to the Gràcia station of the Barcelona-Vallès line.

== Rail services ==
Preceding station	TRAM	Following station
L'Illa towards Bon Viatge	T1	Terminus
L'Illa towards Llevant-Les Planes	T2	Terminus
L'Illa towards Sant Feliu – Consell Comarcal	T3	Terminus

== See also ==
- Trambaix
- Plaça de Francesc Macià, Barcelona
- Avinguda Diagonal
- Barcelona Metro line 8
