= Avinguda de Josep Tarradellas, Barcelona =

Coordinates: 41.3863°N 2.1427°E

Avinguda de Josep Tarradellas, often known as just Avinguda Tarradellas, is an avenue in Barcelona, Spain. Most of it is in the Les Corts district of the city, while the rest acts as the border of two other districts: Sants-Montjuïc and Eixample. It starts at Plaça dels Països Catalans, by Barcelona Sants railway station, and ends at Plaça de Francesc Macià.

It's named after Josep Tarradellas, the first president of the Generalitat de Catalunya in office after the Spanish transition to democracy. It was named Avinguda Infanta Carlota until 1988, after Carlota Joaquina of Spain.

== Transportation ==
The Barcelona Metro station Sants Estació is the best way to access the part of the street closer to the railway station. For the upper end of the avenue Trambaix station Francesc Macià is the best option, as well as a number of bus routes.

== See also ==
- List of streets in Eixample
