= Bac de Roda Bridge =

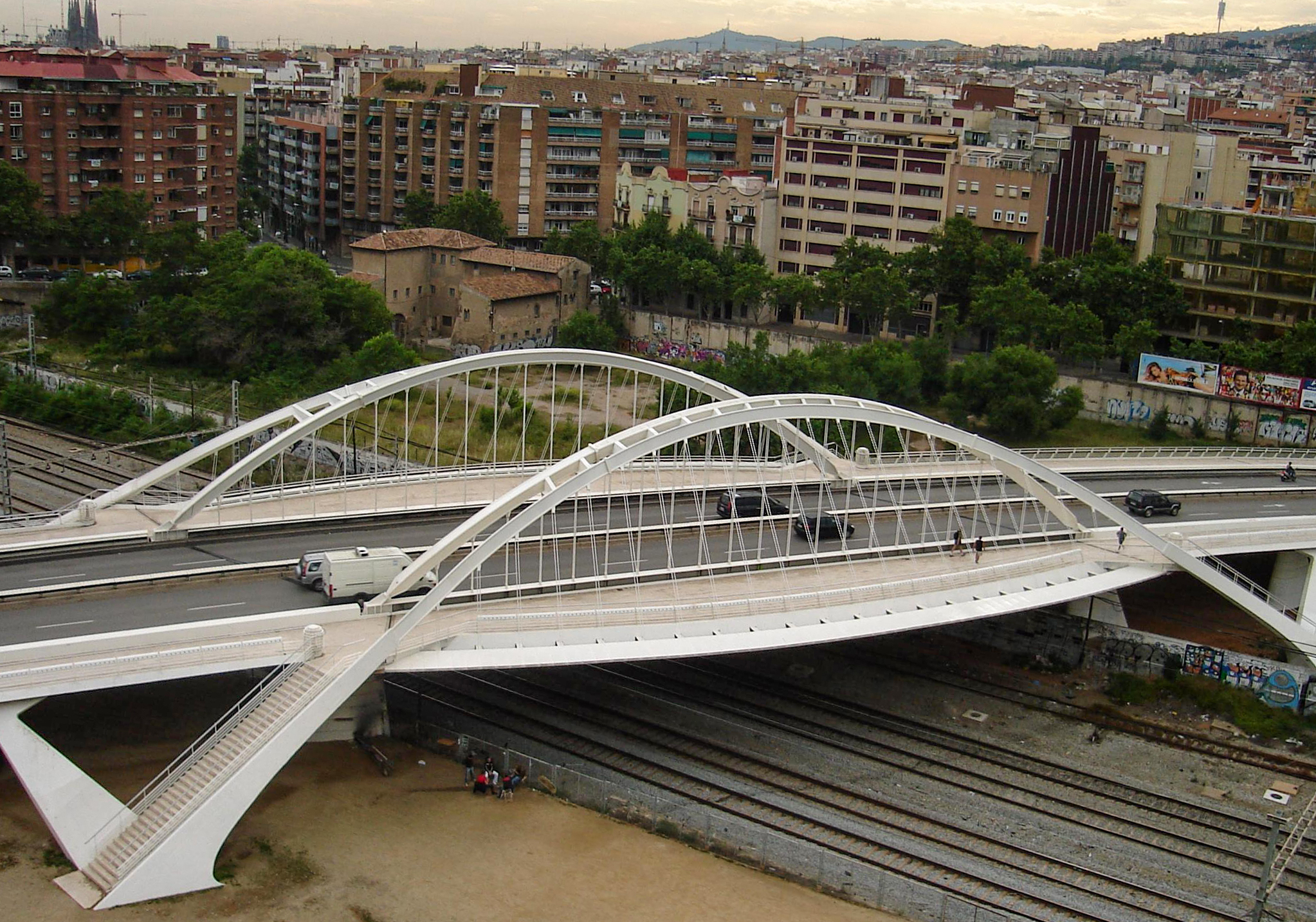
- The Bac de Roda Bridge
- Coordinates: 41.416191°N 2.192464°E
- Locale: Barcelona, Catalonia, Spain
- Official name: Pont de Bac de Roda

Characteristics
- Design: Santiago Calatrava
- Total length: 129 m (423 ft)
- Longest span: 46 m (151 ft)
- Clearance above: 8 m (26 ft)

History
- Opened: 1987

Location
- Interactive map of Bac de Roda Bridge

The Bac de Roda Bridge (Catalan pronunciation: [ˈbaɡ də ˈrɔðə]), known locally as the Calatrava bridge, is a road bridge that links the districts of Sant Andreu and Sant Martí in the city of Barcelona, Catalonia, Spain. The bridge was constructed between 1984 and 1987, to a design by Santiago Calatrava, as part of the preparations for the 1992 Summer Olympics.

The bridge connects the Carrer de Bac de Roda, to the south in Sant Martí, with the Carrer de Felip II, to the north in Sant Andreu, across the main railway approaches to Barcelona from the north. The Bac de Roda station, on line 2 of the Barcelona Metro, is some 100 metres (330 ft) to the south of the bridge.

== Pictures ==
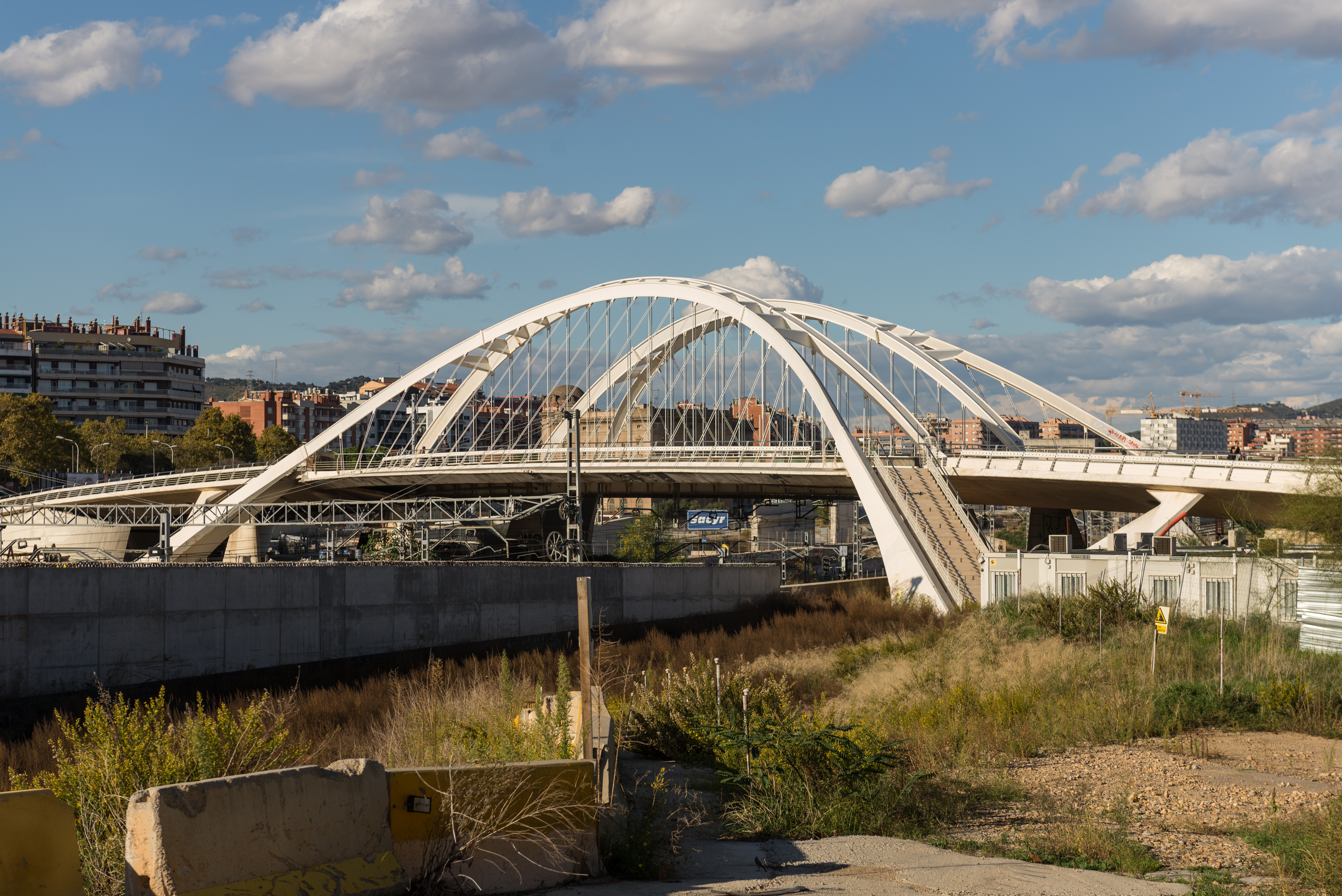
View from south

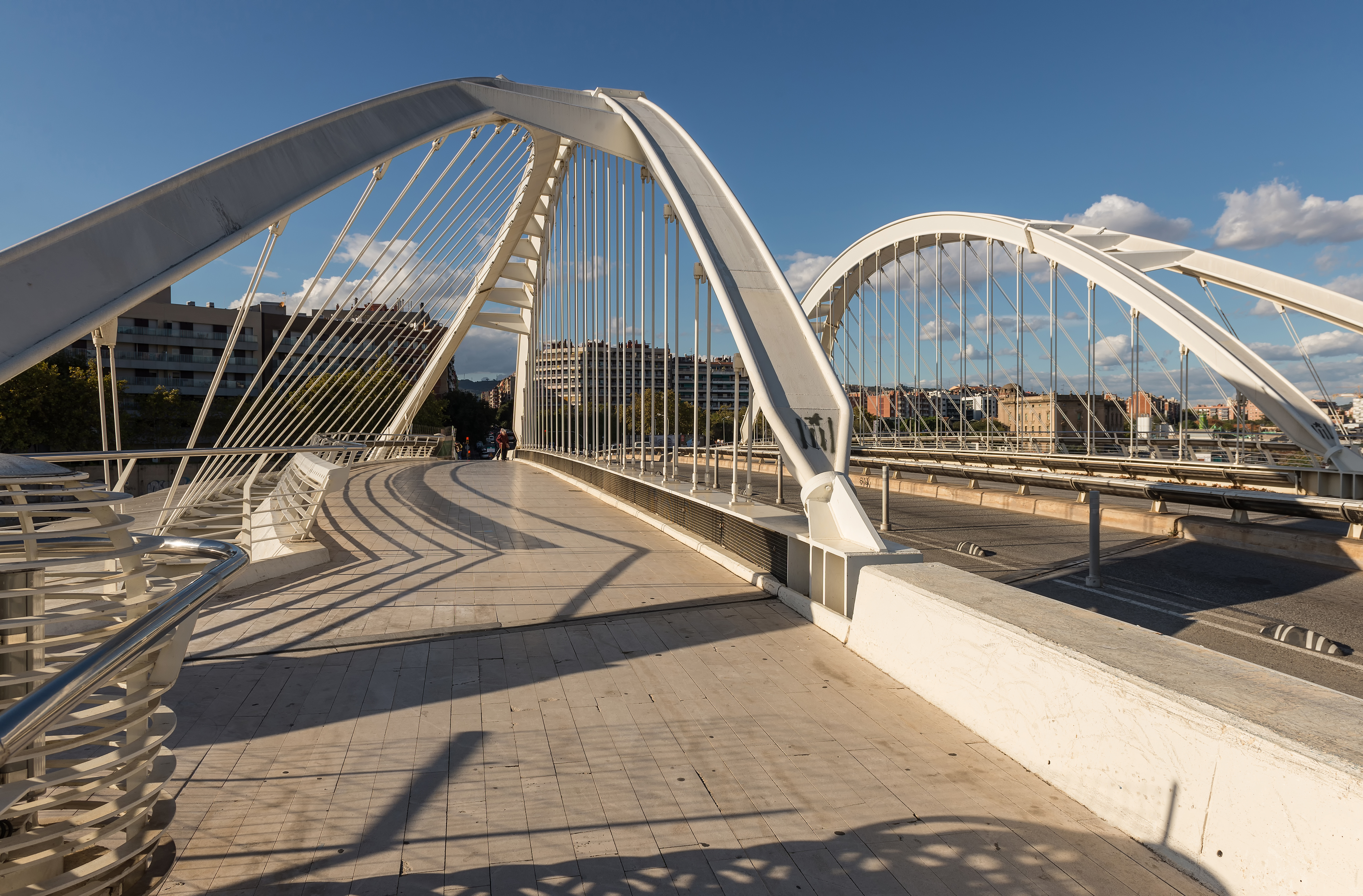
Western walkway

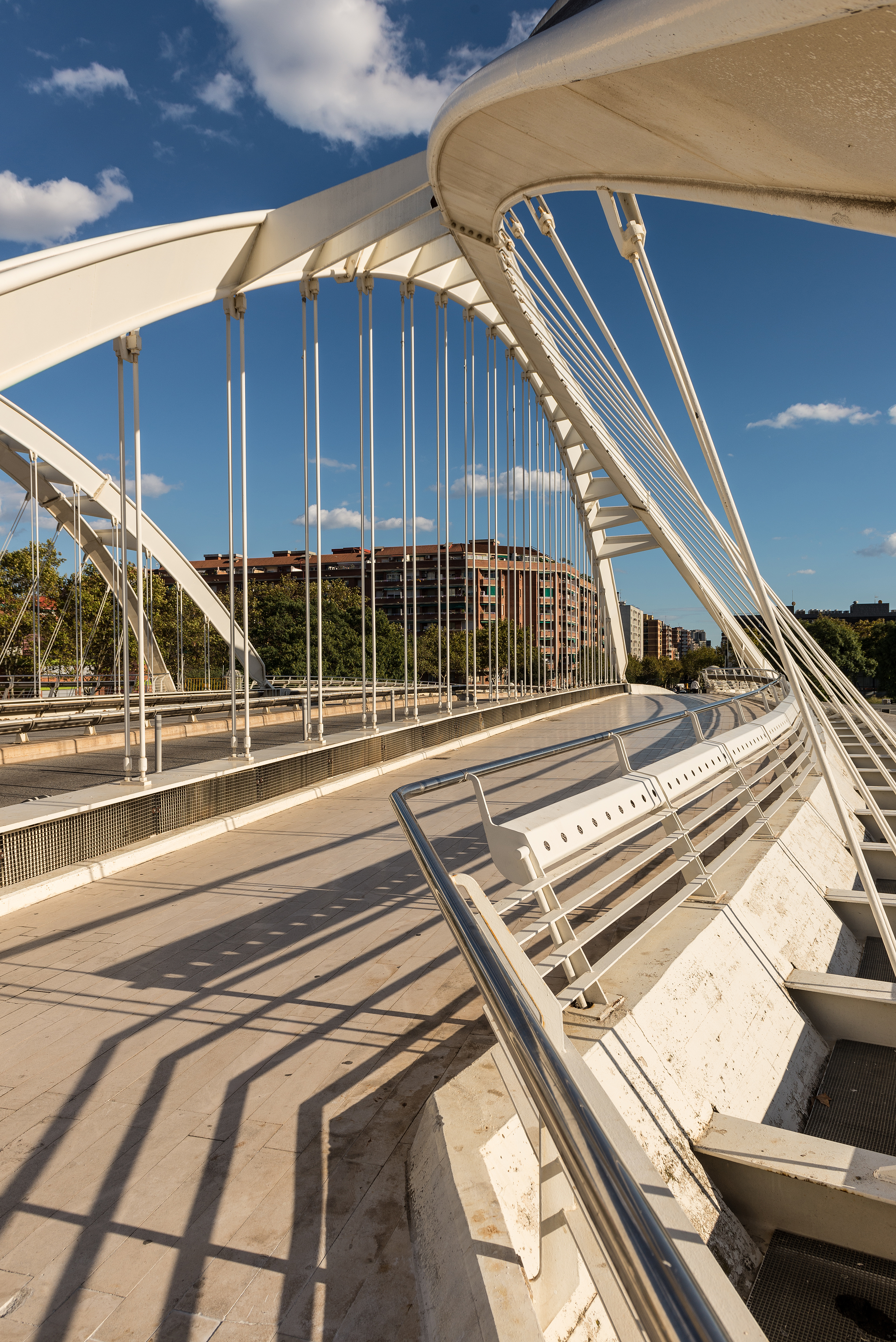
Detail of the structure

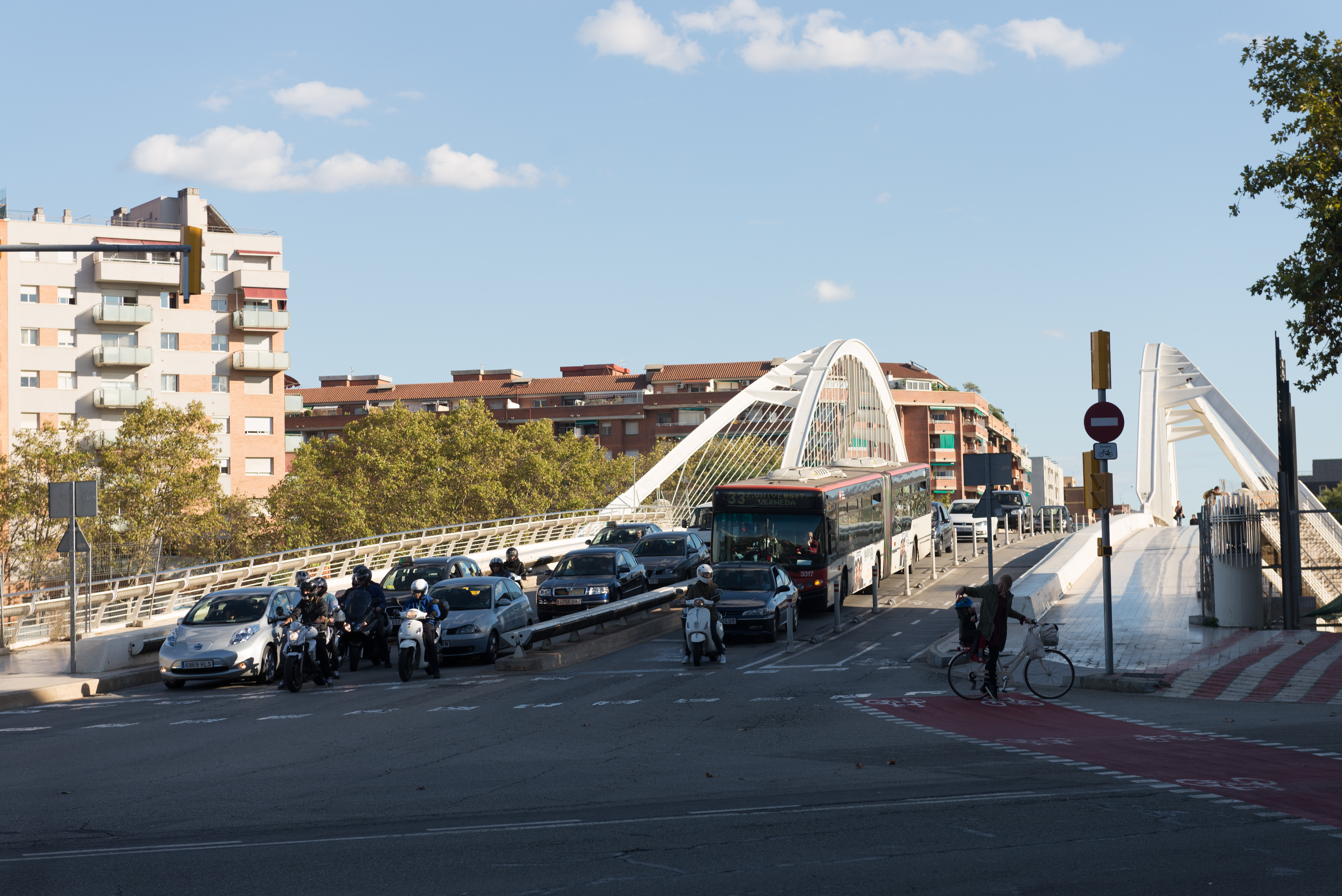
View from Carrer de Felip II
