= Barceloneta station =

Barcelona Metro station

Coordinates: 41°22′58″N 2°11′7″E

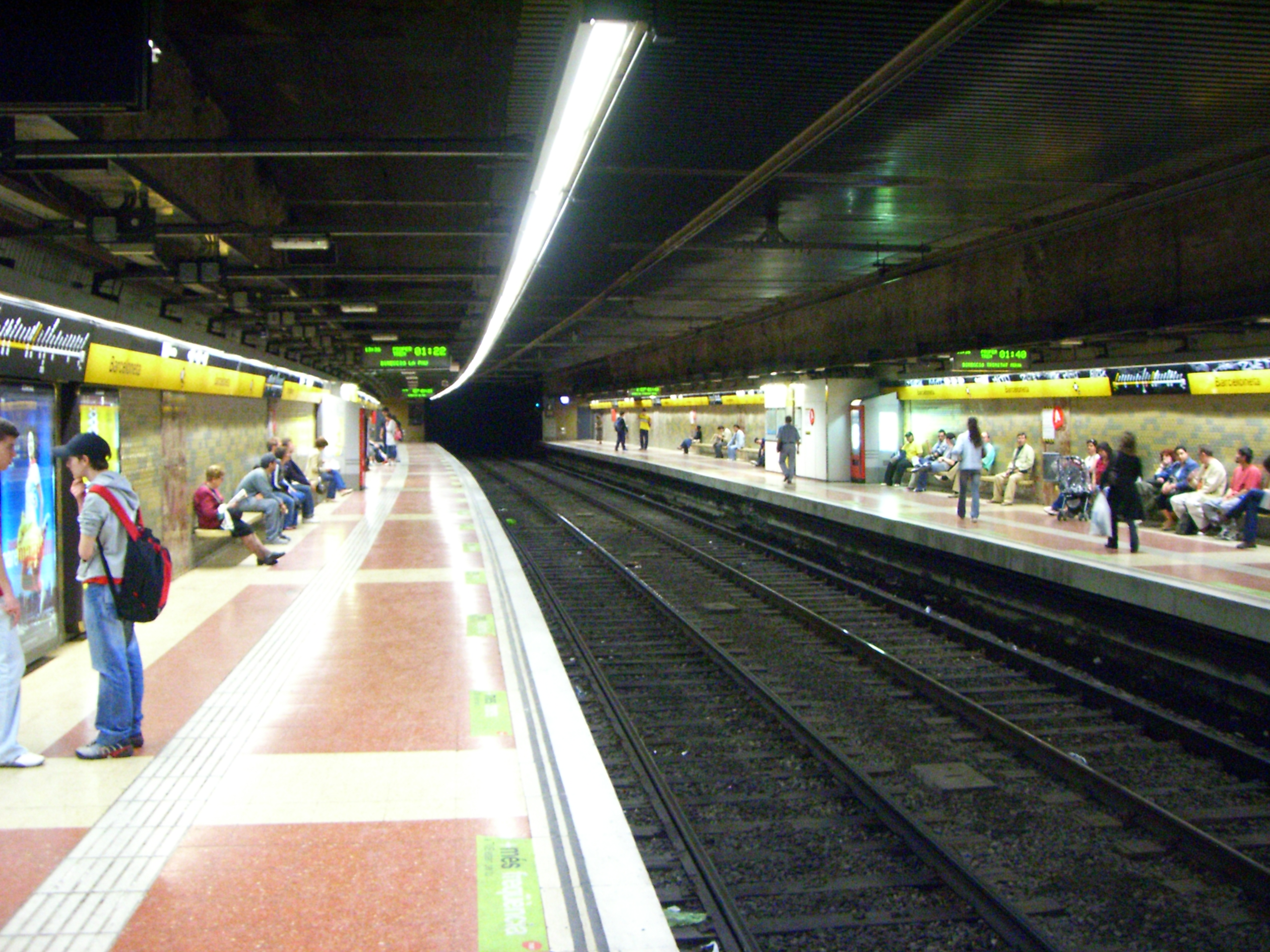
The station's platforms.

Barceloneta (Catalan pronunciation: [bəɾsəluˈnɛtə]) is a station belonging to line L4 of Barcelona Metro. It is located in La Barceloneta neighbourhood, close to the beach and Parc de la Ciutadella. This is the station nearest to Barcelona França railway station, one of the city's major railway stations and one of the R2 commuter line stops.

The station is the least deep underground metro station in the whole system.

== History ==
Barceloneta metro station started being built in 1971 (55 years ago) in order to service the neighbourhood of La Barceloneta, and replacing the old station of Correos (currently abandoned, located between Jaume I and Barceloneta). Construction was slow due to problems, including the explosion which occurred in November 1973.

Finally, the station opened on 15 March 1976 (50 years ago) at 3pm, with visitors like Joaquín Viola, by then mayor of Barcelona. In 2008, the station was made accessible for disabled people.

Preceding station	Metro	Following station
Jaume I towards Trinitat Nova	L4	Ciutadella | Vila Olímpica towards La Pau

== See also ==
- Estació de França
