= Barcelona Metro line 4 =

Rapid transit line in Barcelona, Spain

Coordinates: 41°26′57″N 2°10′56″E

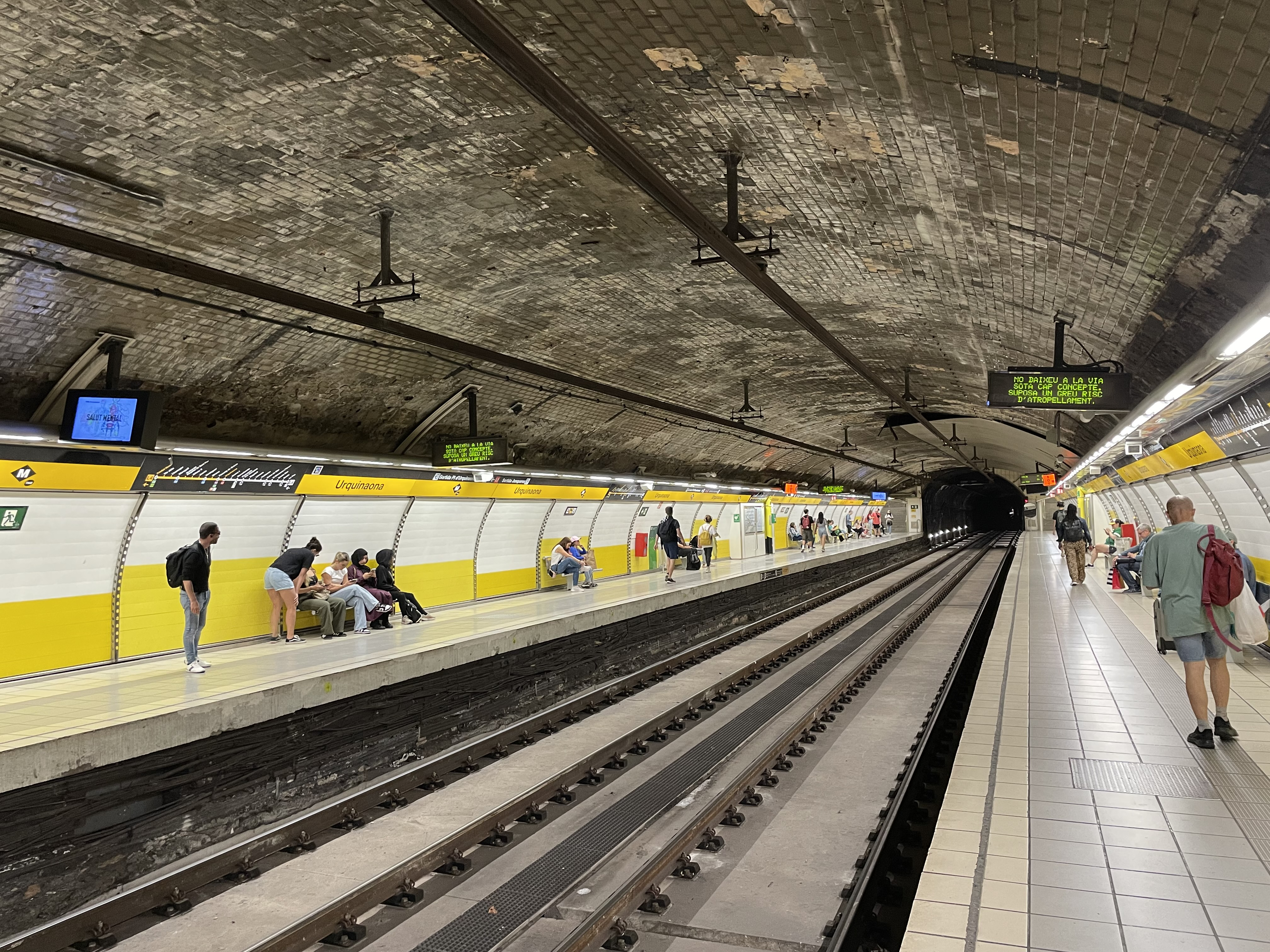
- Platforms at Urquinaona

Overview
- Service type: Rapid transit
- Locale: Barcelona
- First service: 1973; 53 years ago
- Current operator: TMB

Route
- Termini: Trinitat Nova; La Pau
- Stops: 22
- Distance travelled: 16.7 km (10.4 mi)
- Average journey time: 27 minutes

Technical
- Rolling stock: 2100 and 9000 series Trinitat Nova, Triangle Ferroviari depots
- Track gauge: 1,435 mm (4 ft 8 1/2 in) standard gauge
- Electrification: 1,200 V DC rigid overhead wire
- Track owner: TMB

Line 4 (Catalan pronunciation: [ˈlini.ə ˈkwatɾə]), often known as Línia Groga ([ˈlini.ə ˈɣɾɔɣə]; Yellow line), is a rapid transit line of the Barcelona Metro network, operated by TMB and part of the ATM fare-integrated transport network.

Originally opened in 1973, Line 4's route follows an incomplete loop pattern, linking the heart of Barcelona to the districts of Horta-Guinardó and Nou Barris on one side and the neighborhoods of la Barceloneta and Poblenou on the other. Works are currently in progress to extend the line to the future Sagrera railway station and to La Sagrera rapid transit hub.

== Overview ==
Line 4 is a fully underground 16.7 km (10.4 mi) long route with 22 stations. As other lines in the Barcelona Metro network, the line runs on 1,435 mm standard-gauge track and overhead wire electrification. Its current termini are Trinitat Nova, which is an interchange station with Line 3 and Line 11 and La Pau, which is an interchange station with Line 2.

The line runs from la Trinitat Nova, in the Nou Barris district, to La Verneda i la Pau in the district of Sant Martí. Along its route, Line 4 crosses the districts of Horta-Guinardó and Eixample, serving the centre of Barcelona at Passeig de Gràcia and Plaça d'Urquinaona. The line then serves Barcelona's waterfront at la Barceloneta before crossing Poblenou and other neighborhoods in the district of Sant Martí.

Line 4 was used by 61 million passengers in 2024, making it the fourth most used Barcelona Metro line among those managed by TMB.

== History ==
Initially called Line IV (Roman numerals were used on the network at the time), it was originally conceived as a loop line in the 1966 Barcelona Metro plan. In 1971, the project was modified to follow its final alignment.

The line would start operations in 1973, with the initial route taking over part of the original Gran Metropolitano de Barcelona (most of the original route would become part of Line 3). Specifically, the branch from Aragón (nowadays Passeig de Gràcia) to Correos, which had been closed down in 1972, was split from the main branch and combined with a new extension to Joanic to form the initial Line IV route. Correos would be closed permanently to allow for future extensions, with Jaume I becoming the initial terminus of the line. Thus, Urquinaona and Jaume I, which opened in 1926, were the two original Gran Metro stations that became part of Line 4.

The line's first expansion opened in 1974, with a 2 station extension from Joanic to Guinardó. It was extended further to Barceloneta in 1976 and to Selva de Mar in 1977. The line would be extended on both ends in 1982, from Guinardó to Via Júlia and from Selva de Mar to La Pau. That same year, in the context of a general reorganization of the Barcelona Metro, several stations changed names and Line IV became Line 4.

A new extension from La Pau to Pep Ventura would temporarily become part of Line 4 in 1985. Initially conceived as part of Line 5, the Barcelona Metro plan of 1984 would scrap previous plans and assign the route to Line 2. But as the rest of Line 2 was still far from completion, it was decided the section would temporarily be served by Line 4. The La Pau to Pep Ventura section would finally be transferred to Line 2 in 2002, with La Pau becoming the Line 4 terminus once again.

A one station extension to Trinitat Nova, the line's other current terminus, was opened in 1999. Further extension plans towards the isolated Nou Barris neighborhoods on the hills of Collserola were contemplated, but the creation of a new light metro (Line 11) was chosen instead.

El Maresme-Fòrum was opened in 2003 as an infill station, serving El Besòs i el Maresme neighborhood. The station was opened in preparation for the 2004 Universal Forum of Cultures held in Barcelona.

Line 4 is planned to be extended as part of the Line 9 and Line 10 project. The planned expansion consists of a three station extension from the current terminus in La Pau to La Sagrera, also serving the future Sagrera railway station. A small section of tunnel needs to be built to serve a new station, Santander, as the existing tunnel from La Pau to the Triangle Ferroviari depot will be repurposed for revenue service. Since 2010, part of the future Line 4 tunnel has been used by Line 9 and 10 to serve La Sagrera, as the tunnel these lines will use in the future is still under construction. In November 2024, the Government of Catalonia commissioned the project for the remaining 300 meter tunnel and the Santander station, the final components needed to complete the extension.

The alignments for line 4 under the 1966 plan (in black) and 1974 plan (in grey) as well as the extension to La Sagrera under construction (in dashed line)

=== Chronology ===
- 1973 – Joanic-Jaume I section opened (part of it had been part of the original Gran Metro)
- 1974 – Joanic-Guinardó section opened
- 1976 – Jaume I-Barceloneta section opened
- 1977 – Barceloneta-Selva de Mar section opened
- 1982 – Guinardó-Via Júlia and Selva de Mar-La Pau sections opened.
- 1985 – La Pau-Pep Ventura section opened
- 1999 – Via Júlia-Trinitat Nova section opened.
- 2002 – La Pau-Pep Ventura section closed (and transferred to Line 2)
- 2003 – El Maresme-Fòrum station opened.

== Stations ==
Station	Image	District	Opened	Interchanges
Trinitat Nova		Nou Barris	27 October 1999	Barcelona Metro Barcelona Metro line 3 Barcelona Metro line 11
Via Júlia		Nou Barris	19 April 1982	
Llucmajor		Nou Barris	19 April 1982	
Maragall		Horta-Guinardó	19 April 1982	Barcelona Metro Barcelona Metro line 5
Guinardó-Hospital de Sant Pau		Horta-Guinardó	16 May 1974	
Alfons X		Horta-Guinardó	16 May 1974	
Joanic		Gràcia	5 February 1973	
Verdaguer		Eixample	5 February 1973	Barcelona Metro Barcelona Metro line 5 Trambesòs
Girona		Eixample	5 February 1973	
Passeig de Gràcia		Eixample	5 February 1973	Renfe
Urquinaona		Eixample	19 December 1926	Barcelona Metro Barcelona Metro line 1
Jaume I		Ciutat Vella	19 December 1926	
Barceloneta		Ciutat Vella	15 March 1976	Renfe
Ciutadella-Vila Olímpica		Ciutat Vella	7 October 1977	Trambesòs
Bogatell		Sant Martí	7 October 1977	
Llacuna		Sant Martí	7 October 1977	
Poblenou		Sant Martí	7 October 1977	
Selva de Mar		Sant Martí	7 October 1977	Trambesòs
El Maresme-Fòrum		Sant Martí	4 August 2003	Trambesòs
Besòs Mar		Sant Martí	15 October 1982	
Besòs		Sant Martí	15 October 1982	Trambesòs
La Pau		Sant Martí	15 October 1982	Barcelona Metro Barcelona Metro line 2
