= Joanic station =

Metro station in Barcelona, Spain

Coordinates: 41°24′20″N 2°9′47″E

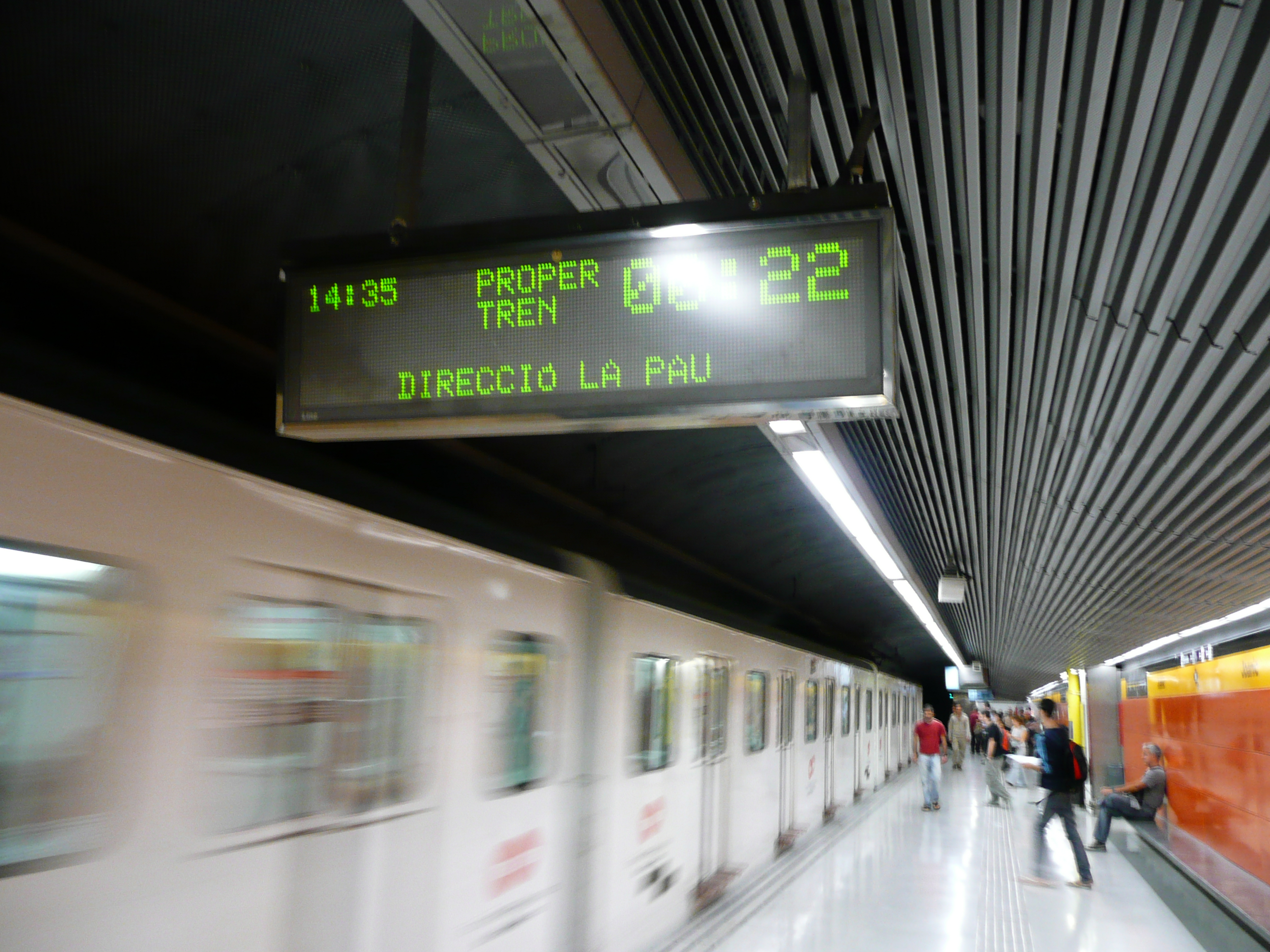
A train reaching Joanic metro station.

Joanic (Catalan pronunciation: [ʒu.əˈnik]) is a station of the Barcelona Metro network located in the district of Gràcia. It's served by L4.

The station opened in 1973 (53 years ago). It's located under carrer de Pi i Margall between Plaça Joanic and carrer de l'Alegre de Dalt, and it can be accessed either from the former or from carrer de l'Escorial.

== Services ==
Preceding station	Metro	Following station
Alfons X towards Trinitat Nova	L4	Verdaguer towards La Pau

Entries & Exits Per Year: 4,509,786 (2016)

== See also ==
- List of Barcelona Metro stations
