= Calvo Sotelo =

Calvo Sotelo is a surname. Notable people with the surname include:

- José Calvo Sotelo (1893–1936), assassinated Spanish jurist and politician
- Leopoldo Calvo-Sotelo (1926–2008), Spanish politician, Prime Minister of Spain from 1981 to 1982

== See also ==
- CF Calvo Sotelo, a Spanish association football team
