= Bac de Roda station =

Metro station in Barcelona, Spain

Coordinates: 41°24′49″N 2°11′38″E

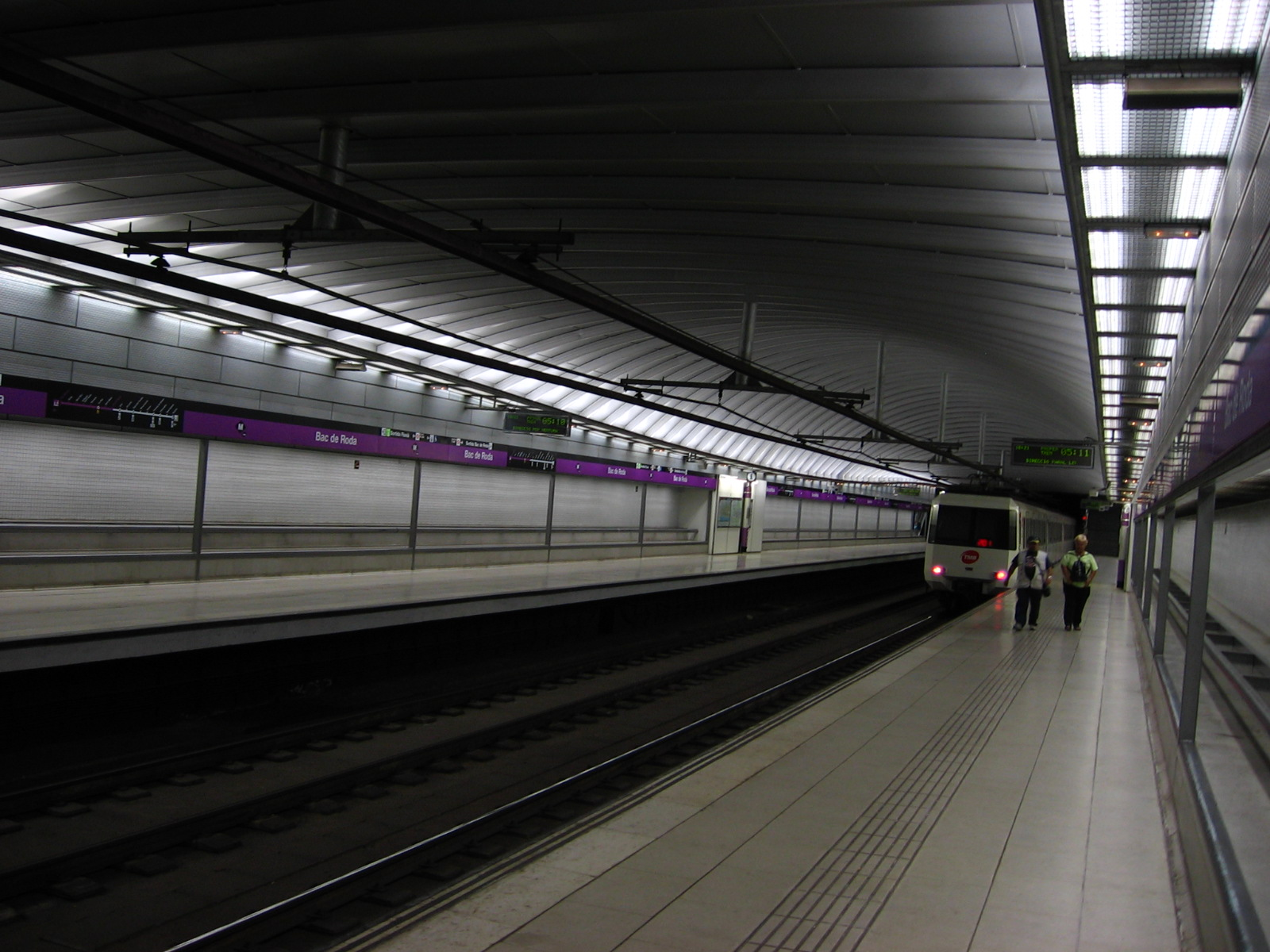

Bac de Roda (Catalan pronunciation: [ˈbaɡ də ˈrɔðə]) is a station on line 2 of the Barcelona Metro.

The station is located underneath Carrer Guipúscoa, between Carrer Bac de Roda and Carrer Fluvià, and about 100 metres (330 ft) south of the iconic Bac de Roda Bridge.

The side-platform station has an access at either end. The Carrer Bac de Roda access, unusually, has separate turnstiles for each platform. The Carrer Fluvià access has an elevator for wheelchair accessibility.

The station was opened in 1997.

== Services ==
Preceding station	Metro	Following station
Clot towards Paral·lel	L2	Sant Martí towards Badalona Pompeu Fabra
