= Plaça de Francesc Macià, Barcelona =

Square in Barcelona, Spain

Coordinates: 41°23′34″N 2°08′40″E

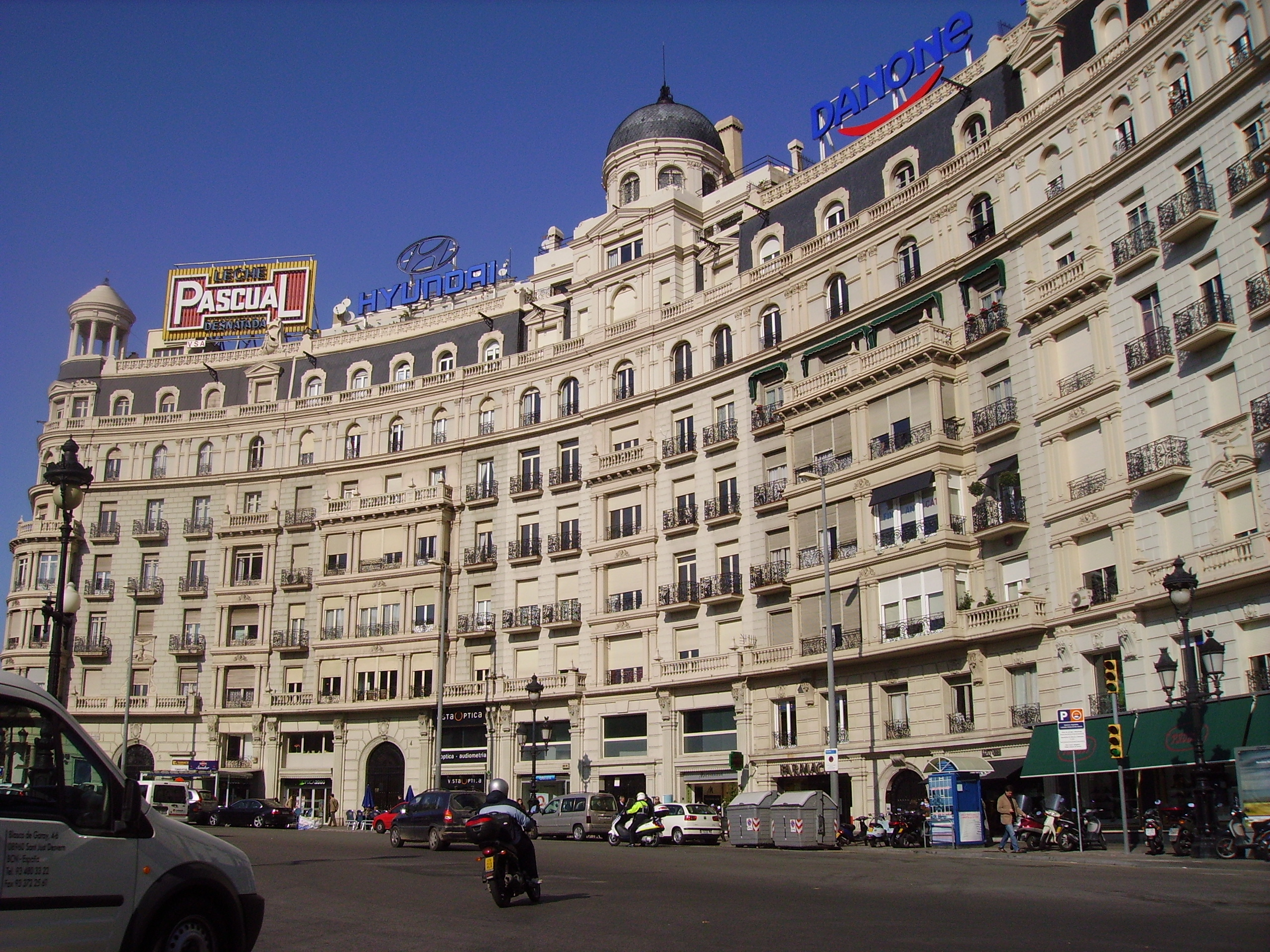

Plaça de Francesc Macià (Catalan pronunciation: [ˈplasə ðə fɾənˈsɛzɡ məsiˈa]) is a square in Barcelona, Catalonia, Spain. Located in one of the main business areas of the city, it is one of the most transited points of Barcelona. It is crossed by Avinguda Diagonal and several other major thoroughfares: Avinguda de Josep Tarradellas, Travessera de Gràcia, Carrer del Comte d'Urgell and Avinguda de Pau Casals. It is part of the Sarrià-Sant Gervasi district, even though it borders two other districts of Barcelona: Les Corts and Eixample.

It is named after Francesc Macià (1859-1933), Catalan president during the Second Spanish Republic who proclaimed a short-lived Catalan Republic.

The central part of the square contains a pond modelled after the shape of Menorca, the birthplace of its architect, Nicolau Rubió i Tudurí, as well as feminine sculpture called Joventut ("youth") designed by Josep Manuel Benedicto, added in 1953.

Spanish-language newspaper La Vanguardia is based in Avinguda Diagonal 477, within square limits.

== History ==
The square was devised by Nicolau Rubió i Tudurí in the 1930s as part of the urban reform envisioned for Barcelona, under the specific name of Proyecto de Urbanización de la Avenida de Alfonso XIII, entre la calle Urgel, desde el Palacio Real hasta el límite del término municipal ("urbanisation project for Alfonso XIII Avenue, between Carrer d'Urgell, from Palau Reial to city government limits"). The square's name has been changed in repeated occasions over time until the transition to democracy (1975-1978). In 1979 its current name was adopted.

=== Names ===
This is the complete list of names given to the square:

- 1932: Alcalá Zamora - former president of the Second Spanish Republic.
- 1936: Hermanos Badía - honouring brothers Josep Badia and Miquel Badia, murdered by FAI members earlier that year.
- 1939: Calvo Sotelo - right-wing monarchist politician during Primo de Rivera's dictatorship and the Second Spanish Republic, murdered in 1936, considered a "martyr of the crusade" during Francisco Franco's dictatorship.
- 1979: Francesc Macià

== Transport ==
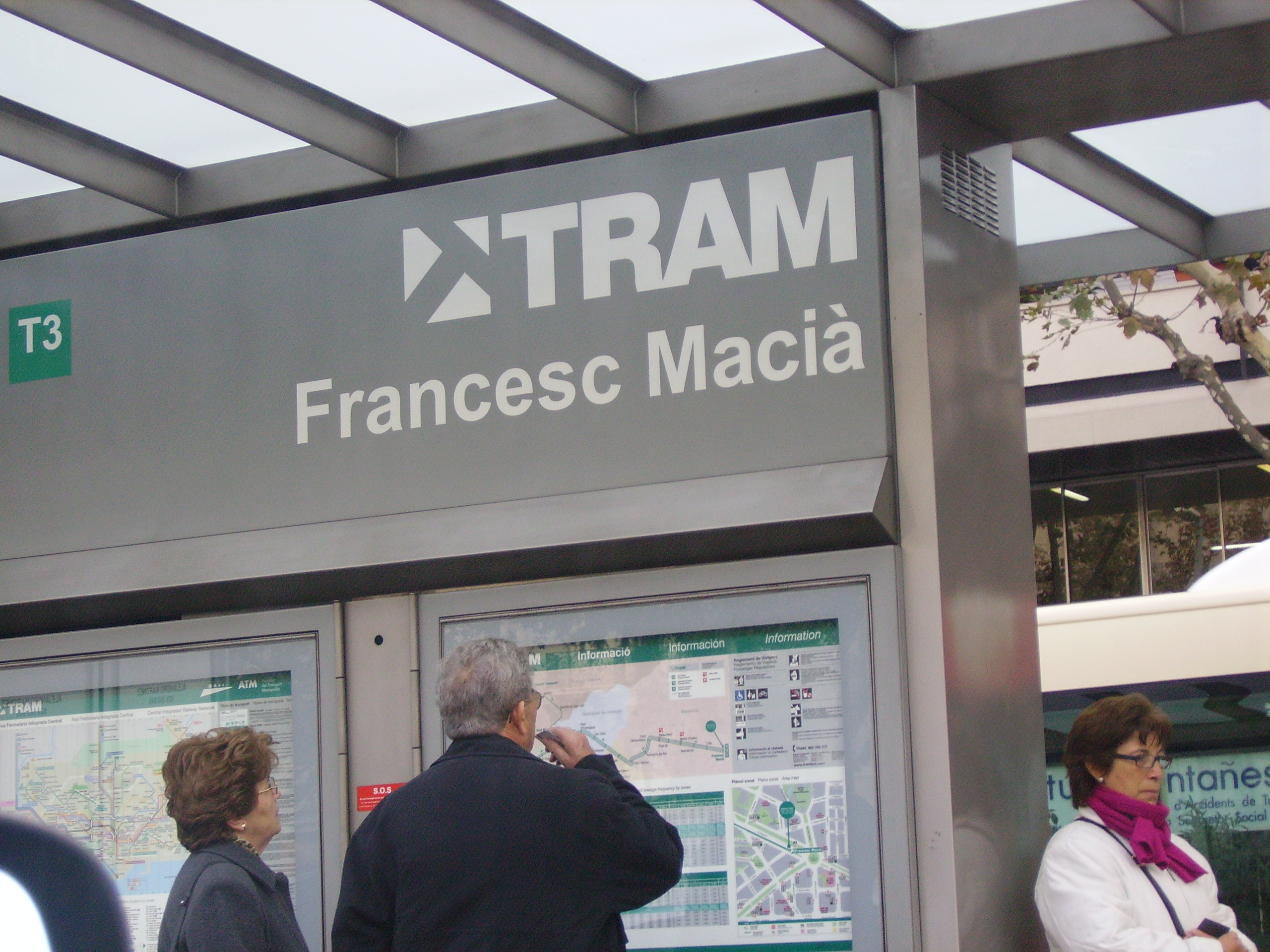
Trambaix station.

The square is the terminus of Trambaix routes T1, T2 and T3.

It can also be accessed using the following bus lines: 6, 7, 14, 15, 27, 32, 33, 34, 41, 54, 59, 63, 66, 67 and 68.

A Barcelona Metro station is projected there: Francesc Macià (Barcelona Metro).
