= Sant Martí station =

Metro station in Barcelona, Spain

Coordinates: 41°25′3″N 2°11′54″E

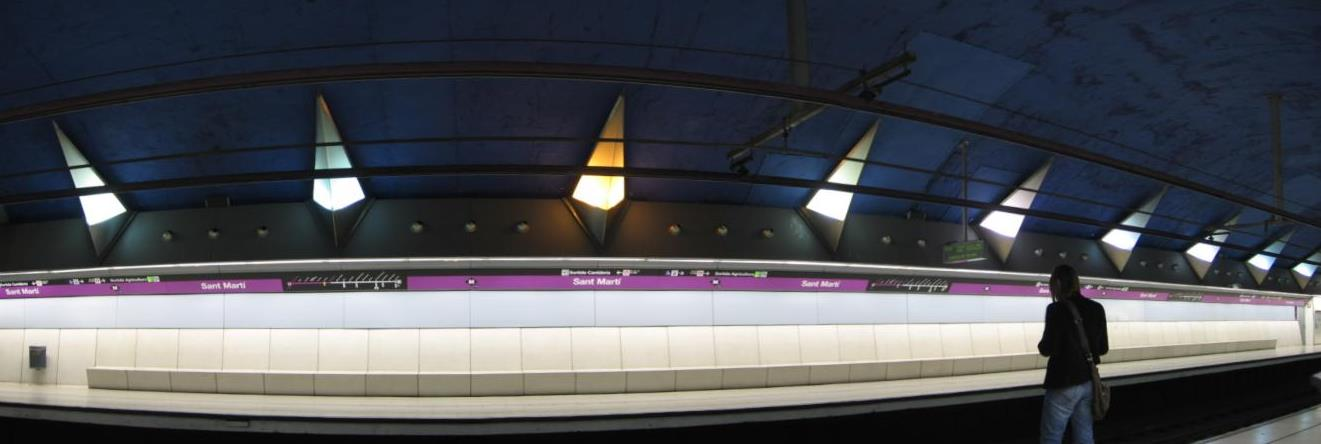

Sant Martí (Catalan pronunciation: [ˈsam mərˈti]) is the name of a Barcelona metro station located in the Sant Martí district of the city, opened in 1997. It is located under Carrer de Guipúscoa, between Carrer Agricultura and Carrer Cantàbria, with an access on each side. The station is served by L2 and is fully adapted for disabled people.

== Services ==
Preceding station	Metro	Following station
Bac de Roda towards Paral·lel	L2	La Pau towards Badalona Pompeu Fabra
