= La Pau station =

Metro station in Barcelona, Spain

Coordinates: 41°25′23″N 2°12′19″E

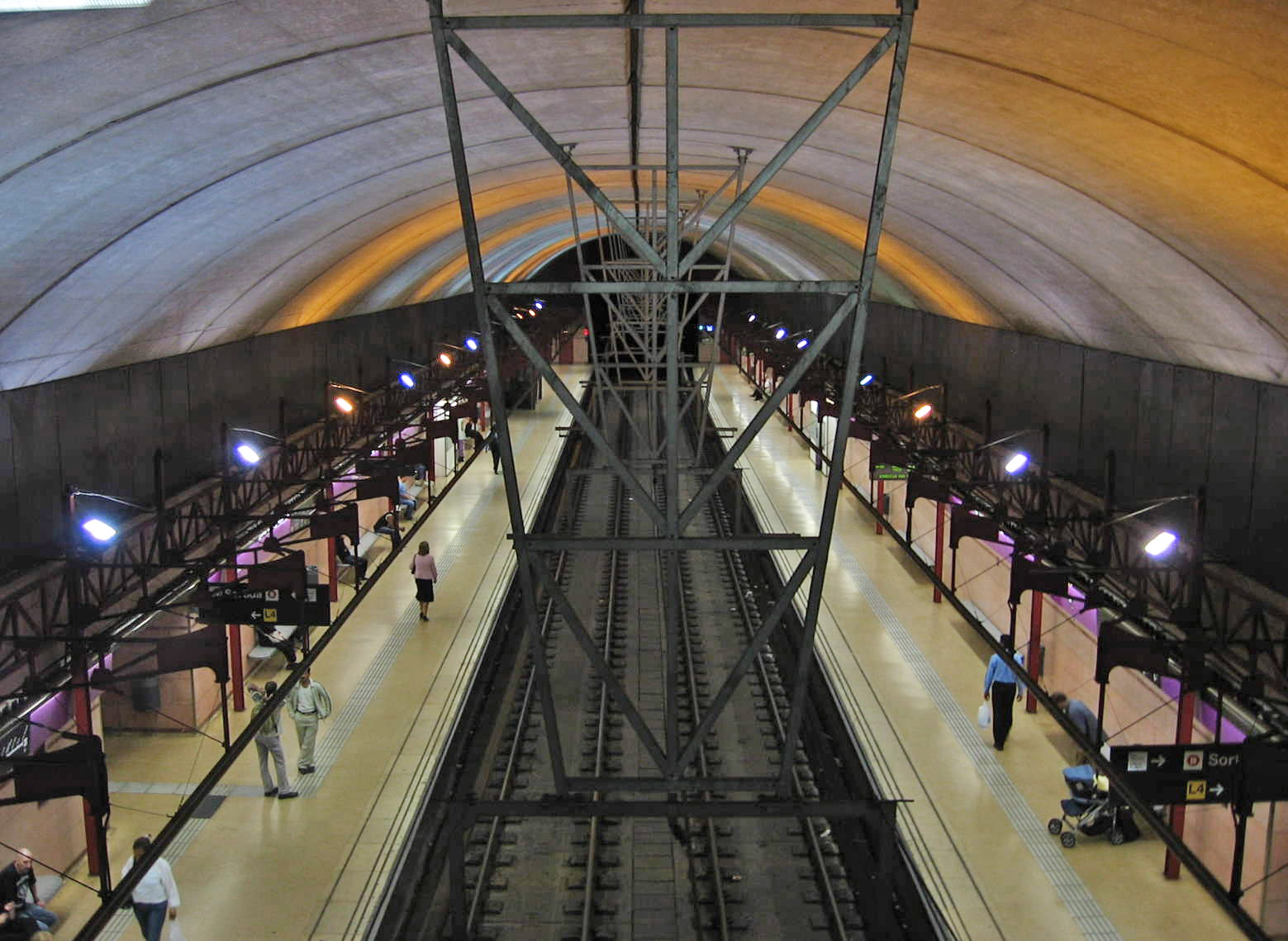
La Pau L2 platforms

La Pau (Catalan pronunciation: [lə ˈpaw]) is a Barcelona metro station located in the neighbourhood of the same name, in the Sant Martí district.

The station is located underground of Carrer Guipúscoa and Carrer Ca n'Oliva. It was opened in 1982 (44 years ago), serving then as the terminus of L4, which had just been extended to La Pau from Selva de Mar. In 1997 (29 years ago) it became the northern terminus of L2, which had formerly been in Sagrada Família.

After several modifications on both lines, it has finally become the north-eastern terminus of L4, which is currently undergoing a substantial extension towards the future Sagrera railway station.

== Services ==
Preceding station	Metro	Following station
Sant Martí towards Paral·lel	L2	Verneda towards Badalona Pompeu Fabra
Besòs towards Trinitat Nova	L4	Terminus
Projected
Besòs towards Trinitat Nova	L4	Santander towards La Sagrera
