= List of Barcelona Metro stations =

Map of the Barcelona metro system

There are 157 stations in the Barcelona Metro, a rapid transit system serving Barcelona in Spain. The first line opened on 30 December 1924, with a line between Plaça de Catalunya and Plaça de Lesseps.

The network currently has 12 lines managed by two different operators. Transports Metropolitans de Barcelona (TMB), the city's transit company, operates the L1, L2, L3, L4, L5, L9, L10, L11 lines and the Funicular de Montjuïc. Ferrocarrils de la Generalitat de Catalunya (FGC), which belongs to the Catalan government or Generalitat de Catalunya, operates lines L6, L7, L8 and L12. Fares are integrated into the six-zone fare system created by the Metropolitan Transport Authority (ATM Area of Barcelona), which also includes urban and intercity buses, trams and commuter trains within the Metropolitan Area of Barcelona and neighbouring counties or municipalities. All metro lines are located in zone 1 of the integrated area.

== List of stations ==
Barcelona metro stations
Name	Lines	Opened	Municipality	District	Transfer
Aeroport T1	Barcelona Metro line 9	2016	El Prat de Llobregat		See Barcelona–El Prat Airport
Aeroport T2	Barcelona Metro line 9	2016	El Prat de Llobregat		R2; see Barcelona–El Prat Airport
Alfons X	Barcelona Metro line 4	1974	Barcelona	Horta-Guinardó	
Almeda	Barcelona Metro line 8	1985	Cornellà de Llobregat	Almeda	S33, S4, S7, S8, R5, FGC line R6
Arc de Triomf	Barcelona Metro line 1	1932	Barcelona	Eixample	R1, R3, R4, Rodalies Barcelona line R7, other Renfe lines
Artigues-Sant Adrià	Barcelona Metro line 2	1985	Badalona / Sant Adrià	Artigues	
Avinguda Carrilet	Barcelona Metro line 1 Barcelona Metro line 8	1987	L'Hospitalet de Llobregat		S33, S4, S7, S8, R5, FGC line R6
Avinguda Tibidabo	Barcelona Metro line 7	1953	Barcelona	Sarrià-Sant Gervasi	Tramvia Blau
Bac de Roda	Barcelona Metro line 2	1997	Barcelona	Sant Martí	
Badal	Barcelona Metro line 5	1969	Barcelona	Sants-Montjuïc	
Badalona Pompeu Fabra	Barcelona Metro line 2	2010	Badalona	Centre	
Barceloneta	Barcelona Metro line 4	1976	Barcelona	Ciutat Vella	see Estació de França
Baró de Viver	Barcelona Metro line 1	1983	Barcelona	Sant Andreu	
Bellvitge	Barcelona Metro line 1	1989	L'Hospitalet de Llobregat	Bellvitge	see Bellvitge railway station
Besòs	Barcelona Metro line 4	1982	Barcelona	Sant Martí	
Besòs Mar	Barcelona Metro line 4	1982	Barcelona	Sant Martí	
Bogatell	Barcelona Metro line 4	1977	Barcelona	Sant Martí	
Bon Pastor	Barcelona Metro line 9 Barcelona Metro line 10	2010	Barcelona	Sant Andreu	
Camp de l'Arpa	Barcelona Metro line 5	1970	Barcelona	Horta-Guinardó	
Can Boixeres	Barcelona Metro line 5	1976	L'Hospitalet de Llobregat	Can Serra	
Can Cuiàs	Barcelona Metro line 11	2003	Montcada i Reixac	Santelvira	
Can Peixauet	Barcelona Metro line 9	2009	Santa Coloma de Gramenet	Safareigs	
Can Serra	Barcelona Metro line 1	1987	L'Hospitalet de Llobregat	Can Serra	
Can Tries - Gornal	Barcelona Metro line 9 Barcelona Metro line 10	2016	L'Hospitalet de Llobregat	Gornal	
Can Vidalet	Barcelona Metro line 5	1986	L'Hospitalet de Llobregat	Can Vidalet	
Can Zam	Barcelona Metro line 9	2009	Santa Coloma de Gramenet	Singuerlín	
Canyelles	Barcelona Metro line 3	2001	Barcelona	Nou Barris	
Casa de l'Aigua	Barcelona Metro line 11	2003	Barcelona	Nou Barris	
Catalunya	Barcelona Metro line 1 Barcelona Metro line 3 Barcelona Metro line 6 Barcelona Metro line 7	1926	Barcelona	Eixample	See Catalunya railway station
Cèntric	Barcelona Metro line 9	2016	El Prat de Llobregat		
Ciutadella-Vila Olímpica	Barcelona Metro line 4	1977	Barcelona	Ciutat Vella	Trambesòs
Ciutat Meridiana	Barcelona Metro line 11	2003	Barcelona	Nou Barris	
Clot	Barcelona Metro line 1 Barcelona Metro line 2	1997	Barcelona	Sant Andreu	see Clot-Aragó railway station
Collblanc	Barcelona Metro line 5 Barcelona Metro line 9 Barcelona Metro line 10	1969	L'Hospitalet de Llobregat		
Congrés	Barcelona Metro line 5	1959	Barcelona	Sant Andreu	
Cornellà Centre	Barcelona Metro line 5	1983	Cornellà de Llobregat	Centre	R1, R2, other Renfe lines
Cornellà Riera	Barcelona Metro line 8	1985	Cornellà de Llobregat	Riera	S33, S4, S7, S8
Diagonal	Barcelona Metro line 3 Barcelona Metro line 5	1924	Barcelona	Eixample	see Provença
Drassanes	Barcelona Metro line 3	1968	Barcelona	Ciutat Vella	
Ecoparc	Barcelona Metro line 10	2021	Barcelona	Zona Franca	
El Carmel	Barcelona Metro line 5	2010	Barcelona	Horta-Guinardó	
El Coll - La Teixonera	Barcelona Metro line 5	2010	Barcelona	Horta-Guinardó	
El Maresme-Fòrum	Barcelona Metro line 4	2003	Barcelona	Sant Martí	Trambesòs
El Prat Estació	Barcelona Metro line 9	2016	El Prat de Llobregat		R2; see El Prat railway station
El Putxet	Barcelona Metro line 7	1953	Barcelona	Sarrià-Sant Gervasi	
Encants	Barcelona Metro line 2	1997	Barcelona	Sant Martí	
Entença	Barcelona Metro line 5	1969	Barcelona	Eixample	
Ernest Lluch	Barcelona Metro line 5	2021	L'Hospitalet de Llobregat	Collblanc	
Església Major	Barcelona Metro line 9	2009	Santa Coloma de Gramenet	El Centre	
Espanya	Barcelona Metro line 1 Barcelona Metro line 3 Barcelona Metro line 8	1929	Barcelona	Sants-Montjuïc	R5, R6, S33, S4, S7, S8
Europa-Fira	Barcelona Metro line 8 Barcelona Metro line 9	2007	L'Hospitalet de Llobregat		R5, R6, S33, S4, S7, S8
Fabra i Puig	Barcelona Metro line 1	1954	Barcelona	Sant Andreu	see Sant Andreu Arenal railway station
Fira	Barcelona Metro line 9	2016	L'Hospitalet de Llobregat		
Florida	Barcelona Metro line 1	1987	L'Hospitalet de Llobregat	La Florida	
Foc	Barcelona Metro line 10	2018	Barcelona	Sants-Montjuïc	
Fondo	Barcelona Metro line 1 Barcelona Metro line 9	1992	Santa Coloma de Gramenet	Fondo	
Foneria	Barcelona Metro line 10	2018	Barcelona	Sants-Montjuïc	
Fontana	Barcelona Metro line 3	1924	Barcelona	Gràcia	
Gavarra	Barcelona Metro line 5	1983	Cornellà de Llobregat	La Gavarra	
Girona	Barcelona Metro line 4	1973	Barcelona	Eixample	
Glòries	Barcelona Metro line 1	1951	Barcelona	Sant Martí	Trambesòs
Gorg	Barcelona Metro line 2 Barcelona Metro line 10	1985	Badalona	Gorg	Trambesòs
Gornal	Barcelona Metro line 8	1987	L'Hospitalet de Llobregat	Bellvitge	S33, S4, S8; see Bellvitge railway station
Gràcia	Barcelona Metro line 6 Barcelona Metro line 7	1929	Barcelona	Gràcia	S1, S2, S5, S55
Guinardó – Hospital de Sant Pau	Barcelona Metro line 4	1974	Barcelona	Horta-Guinardó	
Horta	Barcelona Metro line 5	1967	Barcelona	Horta-Guinardó	
Hospital de Bellvitge	Barcelona Metro line 1	1989	L'Hospitalet de Llobregat	Bellvitge	
Sant Pau – Dos de Maig	Barcelona Metro line 5	1970	Barcelona	Horta-Guinardó	
Hospital Clínic	Barcelona Metro line 5	1969	Barcelona	Eixample	
Hostafrancs	Barcelona Metro line 1	1926	Barcelona	Sants-Montjuïc	
Ildefons Cerdà	Barcelona Metro line 8	1987	Barcelona	Sants-Montjuïc	R5, R6, S33, S4, S7, S8
Jaume I	Barcelona Metro line 4	1926	Barcelona	Ciutat Vella	
Joanic	Barcelona Metro line 4	1973	Barcelona	Gràcia	
La Bonanova	Barcelona Metro line 6	1952	Barcelona	Sarrià-Sant Gervasi	S5, S55
La Pau	Barcelona Metro line 2 Barcelona Metro line 4	1982	Barcelona	Sant Martí	
La Sagrera	Barcelona Metro line 1 Barcelona Metro line 4 Barcelona Metro line 5 Barcelona Metro line 9 Barcelona Metro line 10	1954	Barcelona	Sant Andreu	
La Salut	Barcelona Metro line 10	2010	Badalona	La Salut	
Les Corts	Barcelona Metro line 3	1975	Barcelona	Les Corts	
Les Moreres	Barcelona Metro line 9	2016	El Prat de Llobregat		
Les Tres Torres	Barcelona Metro line 6	1952	Barcelona	Sarrià-Sant Gervasi	S5, S55
Lesseps	Barcelona Metro line 3	1924	Barcelona	Gràcia	
Liceu	Barcelona Metro line 3	1925	Barcelona	Ciutat Vella	
Llacuna	Barcelona Metro line 4	1977	Barcelona	Sant Martí	
Llefià	Barcelona Metro line 10	2010	Badalona	Llefià	
Llucmajor	Barcelona Metro line 4	1982	Barcelona	Horta-Guinardó	
Magòria-La Campana	Barcelona Metro line 8	1997	Barcelona	Sants-Montjuïc	S33, S4, S8
Maragall	Barcelona Metro line 4 Barcelona Metro line 5	1982	Barcelona	Horta-Guinardó	
Maria Cristina	Barcelona Metro line 3	1975	Barcelona	Les Corts	Trambaix
Marina	Barcelona Metro line 1	1933	Barcelona	Eixample-Sant Martí	Trambesòs
Mas Blau	Barcelona Metro line 9	2016	El Prat de Llobregat		
Mercabarna	Barcelona Metro line 9	2016	Barcelona	Zona Franca	
Mercat Nou	Barcelona Metro line 1	1926	Barcelona	Sants-Montjuïc	
Molí Nou-Ciutat Cooperativa	Barcelona Metro line 8	2002	Sant Boi de Llobregat	Molí Nou	R5, R6, S33, S4, S7, S8
Montbau	Barcelona Metro line 3	1985	Barcelona	Horta-Guinardó	
Monumental	Barcelona Metro line 2	1995	Barcelona	Eixample	
Mundet	Barcelona Metro line 3	2001	Barcelona	Horta-Guinardó	
Muntaner	Barcelona Metro line 6	1929	Barcelona	Sarrià-Sant Gervasi	S1, S2, S5, S55
Navas	Barcelona Metro line 1	1953	Barcelona	Sant Andreu	
Onze de Setembre	Barcelona Metro line 9 Barcelona Metro line 10	2010	Barcelona	Sant Andreu	
Palau Reial	Barcelona Metro line 3	1975	Barcelona	Les Corts	Trambaix
Pàdua	Barcelona Metro line 7	1953	Barcelona	Sarrià-Sant Gervasi	
Paral·lel	Barcelona Metro line 2 Barcelona Metro line 3	1970	Barcelona	Sants-Montjuïc	Funicular de Montjuïc
Parc de Montjuïc	Funicular de Montjuïc	1928	Barcelona	Sants-Montjuïc	
Parc Logístic	Barcelona Metro line 9	2016	Barcelona	Zona Franca	
Parc Nou	Barcelona Metro line 9	2016	El Prat de Llobregat		
Passeig de Gràcia	Barcelona Metro line 2 Barcelona Metro line 3 Barcelona Metro line 4	1924	Barcelona	Eixample	see Passeig de Gràcia railway station
Penitents	Barcelona Metro line 3	1985	Barcelona	Horta-Guinardó	
Pep Ventura	Barcelona Metro line 2	1985	Badalona	Centre	
Plaça Molina	Barcelona Metro line 7	1953	Barcelona	Sarrià-Sant Gervasi	
Plaça de Sants	Barcelona Metro line 1 Barcelona Metro line 5	1926	Barcelona	Sants-Montjuïc	
Plaça del Centre	Barcelona Metro line 3	1975	Barcelona	Sants-Montjuïc	
Poblenou	Barcelona Metro line 4	1977	Barcelona	Sant Martí	
Poble Sec	Barcelona Metro line 3	1975	Barcelona	Sants-Montjuïc	
Port Comercial│La Factoria	Barcelona Metro line 10	2021	Barcelona	Zona Franca	
Provença	Barcelona Metro line 6 Barcelona Metro line 7	1929	Barcelona	Eixample	S1, S2, S5, S55
Provençana	Barcelona Metro line 10	2019	L'Hospitalet de Llobregat	Santa Eulàlia	
Pubilla Cases	Barcelona Metro line 5	1973	L'Hospitalet de Llobregat	Pubilla Cases	
Rambla Just Oliveras	Barcelona Metro line 1	1987	L'Hospitalet de Llobregat		R1, R3, R4, R7
Reina Elisenda	Barcelona Metro line 12	1976	Barcelona	Sarrià-Sant Gervasi	
Rocafort	Barcelona Metro line 1	1926	Barcelona	Eixample	
Roquetes	Barcelona Metro line 3	2008	Barcelona	Nou Barris	
Sagrada Família	Barcelona Metro line 2 Barcelona Metro line 5	1970	Barcelona	Eixample	
Sant Andreu	Barcelona Metro line 1	1968	Barcelona	Sant Andreu	Sant Andreu Comtal railway station
Sant Antoni	Barcelona Metro line 2	1995	Barcelona	Eixample	
Sant Boi	Barcelona Metro line 8	1912	Sant Boi de Llobregat		R5, R6, R50, R60, S33, S4, S8
Sant Gervasi	Barcelona Metro line 6	1929	Barcelona	Sarrià-Sant Gervasi	S5, S55
Sant Ildefons	Barcelona Metro line 5	1976	Cornellà de Llobregat		
Sant Josep	Barcelona Metro line 8	1985	L'Hospitalet de Llobregat		S33, S4, S8
Sant Martí	Barcelona Metro line 2	1997	Barcelona	Sant Martí	
Sant Roc	Barcelona Metro line 2	1985	Badalona	Sant Roc	Trambesòs
Santa Coloma	Barcelona Metro line 1	1983	Santa Coloma de Gramenet		
Santa Eulàlia	Barcelona Metro line 1	1983	L'Hospitalet de Llobregat	Santa Eulàlia	
Santa Rosa	Barcelona Metro line 9	2011	Santa Coloma de Gramenet		
Sants Estació	Barcelona Metro line 3 Barcelona Metro line 5	1969	Barcelona	Sants-Montjuïc	see Barcelona Sants railway station
Sarrià	Barcelona Metro line 6 Barcelona Metro line 12	1929	Barcelona	Sarrià-Sant Gervasi	S1, S2, S5, S55
Selva de Mar	Barcelona Metro line 4	1977	Barcelona	Sant Martí	Trambesòs
Singuerlín	Barcelona Metro line 9	2009	Santa Coloma de Gramenet	Singuerlín	
Tetuan	Barcelona Metro line 2	1995	Barcelona	Eixample	
Torras i Bages	Barcelona Metro line 1	1968	Barcelona	Sant Andreu	
Torrassa	Barcelona Metro line 1 Barcelona Metro line 9 Barcelona Metro line 10	1983	L'Hospitalet de Llobregat	La Torrassa	
Torre Baró-Vallbona	Barcelona Metro line 11	2003	Barcelona	Nou Barris	see Torre del Baró railway station
Trinitat Nova	Barcelona Metro line 3 Barcelona Metro line 4 Barcelona Metro line 11	1999	Barcelona	Nou Barris	
Trinitat Vella	Barcelona Metro line 1	1983	Barcelona	Sant Andreu	
Universitat	Barcelona Metro line 1 Barcelona Metro line 2	1926	Barcelona	Eixample	
Urgell	Barcelona Metro line 1	1926	Barcelona	Eixample	
Urquinaona	Barcelona Metro line 1 Barcelona Metro line 4	1926	Barcelona	Eixample	
Valldaura	Barcelona Metro line 3	2001	Barcelona	Nou Barris	
Vall d'Hebron	Barcelona Metro line 3 Barcelona Metro line 5	1985	Barcelona	Horta-Guinardó	
Verdaguer	Barcelona Metro line 4 Barcelona Metro line 5	1970	Barcelona	Eixample	
Verneda	Barcelona Metro line 2	1985	Sant Adrià de Besòs		
Via Júlia	Barcelona Metro line 4	1982	Barcelona	Nou Barris	
Vilapicina	Barcelona Metro line 5	1959	Barcelona	Horta-Guinardó	
Virrei Amat	Barcelona Metro line 5	1959	Barcelona	Horta-Guinardó	
ZAL│Riu Vell	Barcelona Metro line 10	2021	Barcelona	Zona Franca	
Zona Franca	Barcelona Metro line 10	2020	Barcelona	Zona Franca	
Zona Universitària	Barcelona Metro line 3 Barcelona Metro line 9	1975	Barcelona	Les Corts	Trambaix

== Sorted by line ==
=== Line 1 ===
Hospital de Bellvitge - Fondo

- Hospital de Bellvitge
- Bellvitge
- Avinguda Carrilet
- Rambla Just Oliveras
- Can Serra
- Florida
- Torrassa
- Santa Eulàlia
- Mercat Nou
- Plaça de Sants
- Hostafrancs
- Espanya
- Rocafort
- Urgell
- Universitat
- Catalunya
- Urquinaona
- Arc de Triomf
- Marina
- Glòries
- Clot
- Navas
- La Sagrera
- Fabra i Puig
- Sant Andreu
- Torras i Bages
- Trinitat Vella
- Baró de Viver
- Santa Coloma
- Fondo

=== Line 2 ===
Paral·lel - Badalona Pompeu Fabra

- Paral·lel
- Sant Antoni
- Universitat
- Passeig de Gràcia
- Tetuan
- Monumental
- Sagrada Família
- Encants
- Clot
- Bac de Roda
- Sant Martí
- La Pau
- Verneda
- Artigues/Sant Adrià
- Sant Roc
- Gorg
- Pep Ventura
- Badalona Pompeu Fabra

=== Line 3 ===
Zona Universitària - Trinitat Nova

- Zona Universitària
- Palau Reial
- Maria Cristina
- Les Corts
- Plaça del Centre
- Sants Estació
- Tarragona
- Espanya
- Poble Sec
- Paral·lel
- Drassanes
- Liceu
- Catalunya
- Passeig de Gràcia
- Diagonal ( at Provença)
- Fontana
- Lesseps
- Vallcarca
- Penitents
- Vall d'Hebron
- Montbau
- Mundet
- Valldaura
- Canyelles
- Roquetes
- Trinitat Nova

=== Line 4 ===
Trinitat Nova - La Pau

- Trinitat Nova
- Via Júlia
- Llucmajor
- Maragall
- Guinardó/Hospital de Sant Pau
- Alfons X
- Joanic
- Verdaguer
- Girona
- Passeig de Gràcia
- Urquinaona
- Jaume I
- Barceloneta
- Ciutadella/Vila Olímpica
- Bogatell
- Llacuna
- Poblenou
- Selva de Mar
- El Maresme/Fòrum
- Besòs Mar
- Besòs
- La Pau

=== Line 5 ===
Cornellà Centre - Vall d'Hebron

- Cornellà Centre
- Gavarra
- Sant Ildefons
- Can Boixeres
- Can Vidalet
- Pubilla Cases
- Ernest Lluch
- Collblanc
- Badal
- Plaça de Sants
- Sants Estació
- Entença
- Hospital Clínic
- Diagonal ( at Provença)
- Verdaguer
- Sagrada Família
- Sant Pau/Dos de Maig
- Camp de l'Arpa
- La Sagrera
- Congrés
- Maragall
- Virrei Amat
- Vilapicina
- Horta
- El Carmel
- El Coll/La Teixonera
- Vall d'Hebron

=== Line 6 ===
Pl. Catalunya - Sarrià

- Barcelona-Plaça Catalunya
- Provença ( at Diagonal)
- Gràcia
- Sant Gervasi ( at Plaça Molina)
- Muntaner
- La Bonanova
- Les Tres Torres
- Sarrià

=== Line 7 ===
Pl. Catalunya - Av. Tibidabo

- Barcelona-Plaça Catalunya
- Provença ( at Diagonal)
- Gràcia
- Plaça Molina ( at Sant Gervasi)
- Pàdua
- El Putxet
- Avinguda Tibidabo (Tramvia blau)

=== Line 8 ===
Barcelona - Moli Nou

- Barcelona-Plaça Espanya
- Magòria-La Campana
- Ildefons Cerdà
- Europa/Fira
- Gornal
- Sant Josep
- L'Hospitalet-Avinguda Carrilet
- Almeda
- Cornellà Riera
- Sant Boi
- Molí Nou-Ciutat Cooperativa

=== Line 9 ===
L9 Sud: Aeroport T1 - Zona Universitària

- Aeroport T1
- Aeroport T2
- Mas Blau
- Parc Nou
- Cèntric
- El Prat Estació
- Les Moreres
- Mercabarna
- Parc Logístic
- Fira
- Europa/Fira
- Can Tries/Gornal
- Torrassa
- Collblanc
- Zona Universitària

L9 Nord: La Sagrera - Can Zam

- La Sagrera
- Onze de Setembre
- Bon Pastor
- Can Peixauet
- Santa Rosa
- Fondo
- Església Major
- Singuerlín
- Can Zam

=== Line 10 ===
L10 Nord: La Sagrera - Gorg

- La Sagrera
- Onze de Setembre
- Bon Pastor
- Llefià
- La Salut
- Gorg

L10 Sud: Collblanc - ZAL | Riu Vell

- Collblanc
- Torrassa
- Can Tries/Gornal
- Provençana
- Ciutat de la Justícia
- Foneria
- Foc
- Zona Franca
- Port Comercial/La Factoria
- Ecoparc
- ZAL/Riu Vell

=== Line 11 ===
Trinitat Nova - Can Cuiàs

- Trinitat Nova
- Casa de l'Aigua
- Torre Baró/Vallbona
- Ciutat Meridiana
- Can Cuiàs

=== Line 12 ===
Sarrià - Reina Elisenda

- Sarrià
- Reina Elisenda

=== Funicular de Montjuïc ===
The funicular is connected to and fare-integrated with the metro.

- Paral·lel
- Parc de Montjuïc

== See also ==
- Disused Barcelona Metro stations
- List of tram stations in Barcelona
- List of railway stations in Barcelona
- List of Rodalies Barcelona railway stations
