= Vallcarca =

- Vallcarca i els Penitents, Barcelona neighbourhood in the Gràcia District
- Vallcarca metro station, a station on the Barcelona Metro system
- Vallcarca, Sitges, a limestone quarry complex with a now abandoned settlement in the Garraf Massif, Catalonia, Spain
- Vallcarca railway station, the quarry's now-abandoned railroad station
