= Besòs =

Besòs may refer to:

- Besòs (river), a river in Catalonia, Spain
- Besòs (Barcelona Metro)
