= Clot station =

Clot station may refer to:

- Clot station (Barcelona Metro)
- El Clot railway station
