= Florida station =

Florida station or Florida Station may refer to:

- Bellavista de La Florida metro station, a station on the Santiago Metro in Chile
- Florida (Barcelona Metro), a station on the Barcelona Metro in Catalonia, Spain
- Florida Station, Northern Territory, a former cattle station in Arnhem Land, Australia
- Florida station (RTD), a station on the RTD rail system in Aurora, Colorado, United States
- Mount Florida railway station, a station on the Glasgow suburban railway network in Scotland, United Kingdom
- Strata Florida railway station, a former station on the Carmarthen to Aberystwyth line in Wales, United Kingdom

== See also ==
- Category:Radio stations in Florida
- Category:Railway stations in Florida
- Category:Television stations in Florida
