= Penitents station =

Metro station in Barcelona, Spain

Penitents
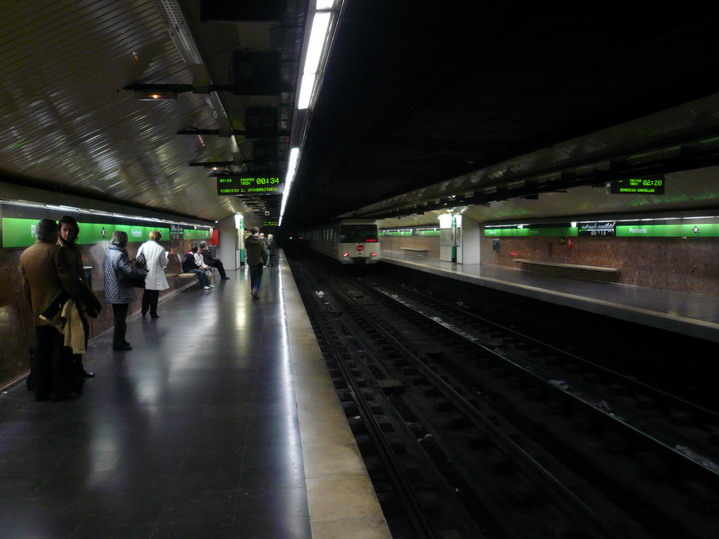
- Station platforms

General information
- Location: Barcelona (Gràcia)
- Coordinates: 41°25′2″N 2°8′28″E
- System: Barcelona Metro rapid transit station
- Owner: Transports Metropolitans de Barcelona
- Platforms: 2 side platforms
- Tracks: 2

Construction
- Structure type: Underground

Other information
- Fare zone: 1 (ATM)

History
- Opened: 1985

Services
Preceding station	Metro	Following station
Vallcarca towards Zona Universitària	L3	Vall d'Hebron towards Trinitat Nova
Location
- Location within Barcelona Location within Spain

Penitents (Catalan pronunciation: [pəniˈtens]) is a Barcelona Metro station, named after the Vallcarca i els Penitents neighbourhood, in the Gràcia district of Barcelona. The station is served by line L3.

The station opened in 1985, when the section of line L3 between Lesseps and Montbau stations was opened.

The station is located underneath Avinguda de Vallcarca (formerly known as the Avinguda de l'Hospital Militar), between Carrer del Gòlgota, Barcelona and Carrer d'Anna Piferrer, and can be accessed from entrances in the former and the latter, leading to a single ticket hall. It has twin side platforms that are 96 metres (315 ft) long.

== See also ==
- List of Barcelona Metro stations
