= Encants station =

Metro station in Barcelona, Spain

Coordinates: 41°24′24″N 2°10′56″E

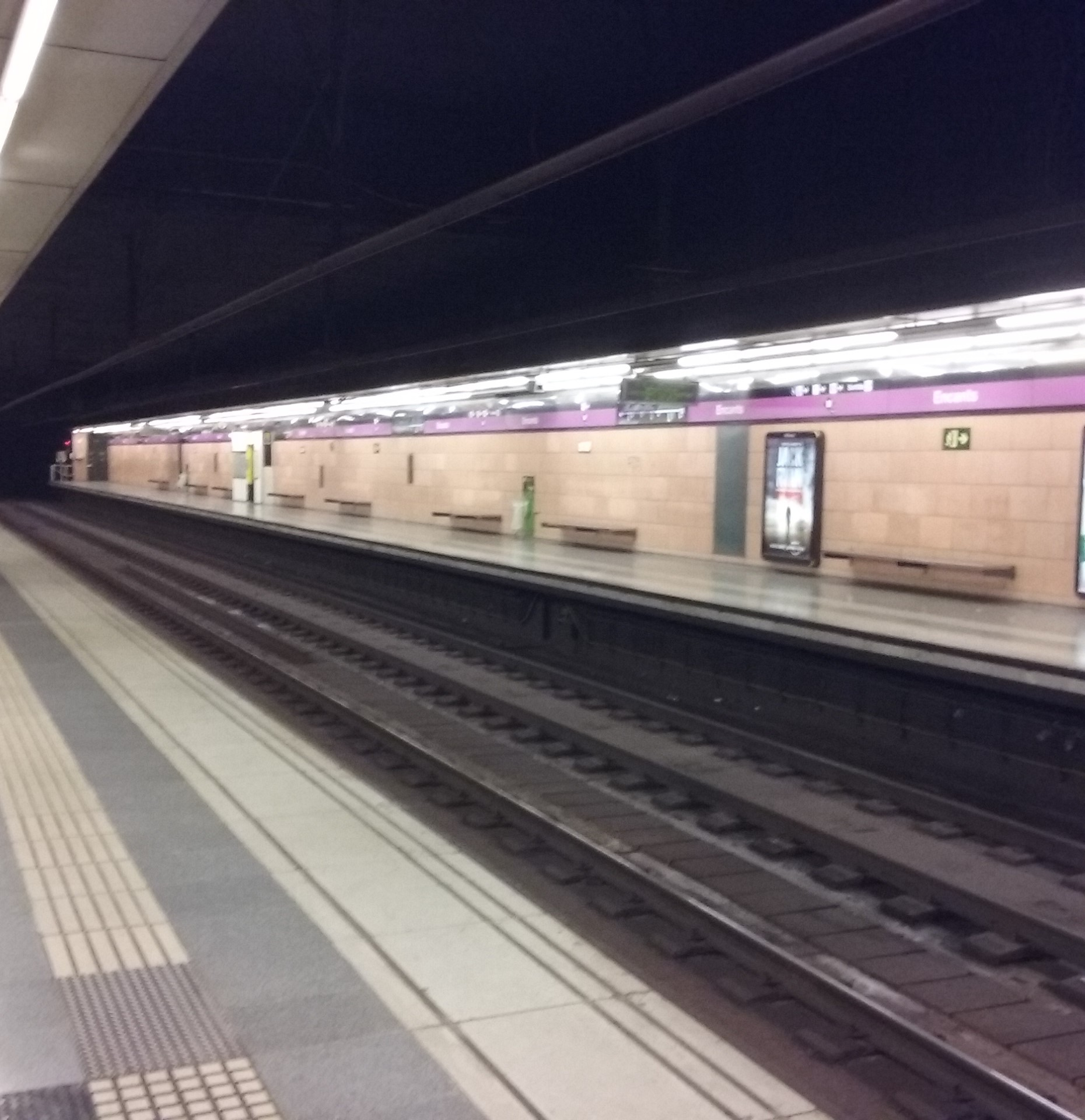
Encants station platforms

Encants (Catalan pronunciation: [əŋˈkans]) is a Barcelona Metro station in the Eixample district of Barcelona, served by L2. It opened in 1997. It is located under carrer de València between carrer del Dos de Maig and carrer de la Independència, and is accessible from both sides of the intersection of carrer de València and Dos de de Maig.

The station is named after the nearby Encants Vells and Encants Nous, two markets.

== Services ==
Preceding station	Metro	Following station
Sagrada Família towards Paral·lel	L2	Clot towards Badalona Pompeu Fabra

== See also ==
- List of Barcelona Metro stations
