= Vallcarca station =

Metro station in Barcelona, Spain

Vallcarca
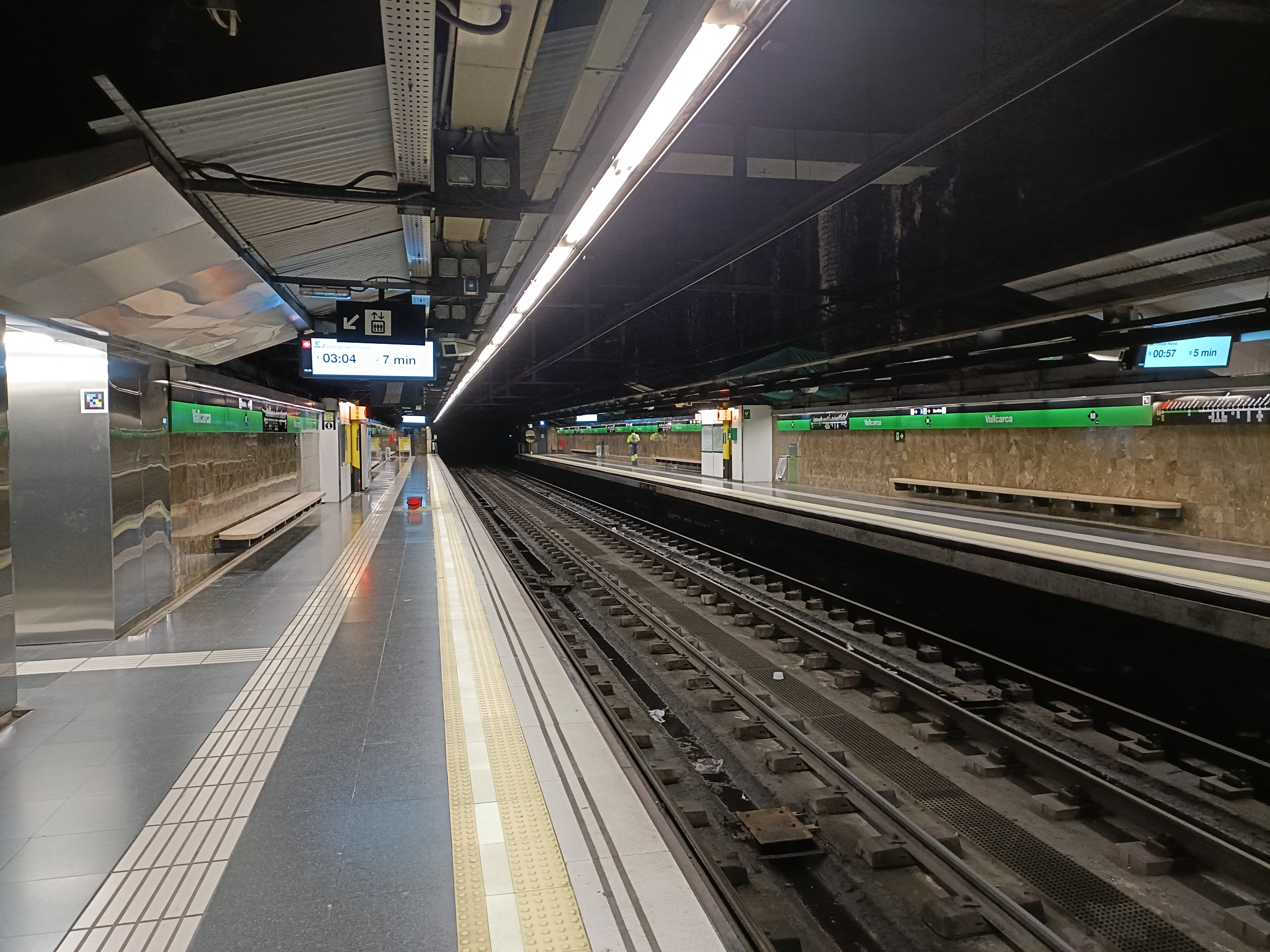

General information
- Location: Barcelona (Gràcia)
- Coordinates: 41°24′41″N 2°8′41″E
- System: Barcelona Metro rapid transit station
- Owner: Transports Metropolitans de Barcelona
- Platforms: 2 side platforms
- Tracks: 2

Construction
- Structure type: Underground

Other information
- Fare zone: 1 (ATM)

History
- Opened: 1985

Services
Preceding station	Metro	Following station
Lesseps towards Zona Universitària	L3	Penitents towards Trinitat Nova
Location
- Location within Barcelona Location within Spain

Vallcarca (Catalan pronunciation: [ˌbaʎˈkarkə]) is a Barcelona Metro station in the Vallcarca i els Penitents neighbourhood, in the Gràcia district of Barcelona.The station is served by line L3.

The station opened in 1985 when the section of line L3 between Lesseps and Montbau stations was inaugurated.

The station is located underneath Avinguda de Vallcarca (formerly known as the Avinguda de l'Hospital Militar), between Carrer de l'Argentera and the Vallcarca bridge. It has three entrances and can be accessed from either side of Avinguda de Vallcarca, as well as from Avinguda de la República Argentina. It has twin side platforms that are 93 metres (305 ft) long and which are accessed from the entrance lobby by stairs, lift, escalators.

== See also ==
- List of Barcelona Metro stations
