= Besòs Mar station =

Metro station in Barcelona, Spain

Coordinates: 41°24′53″N 2°13′0″E

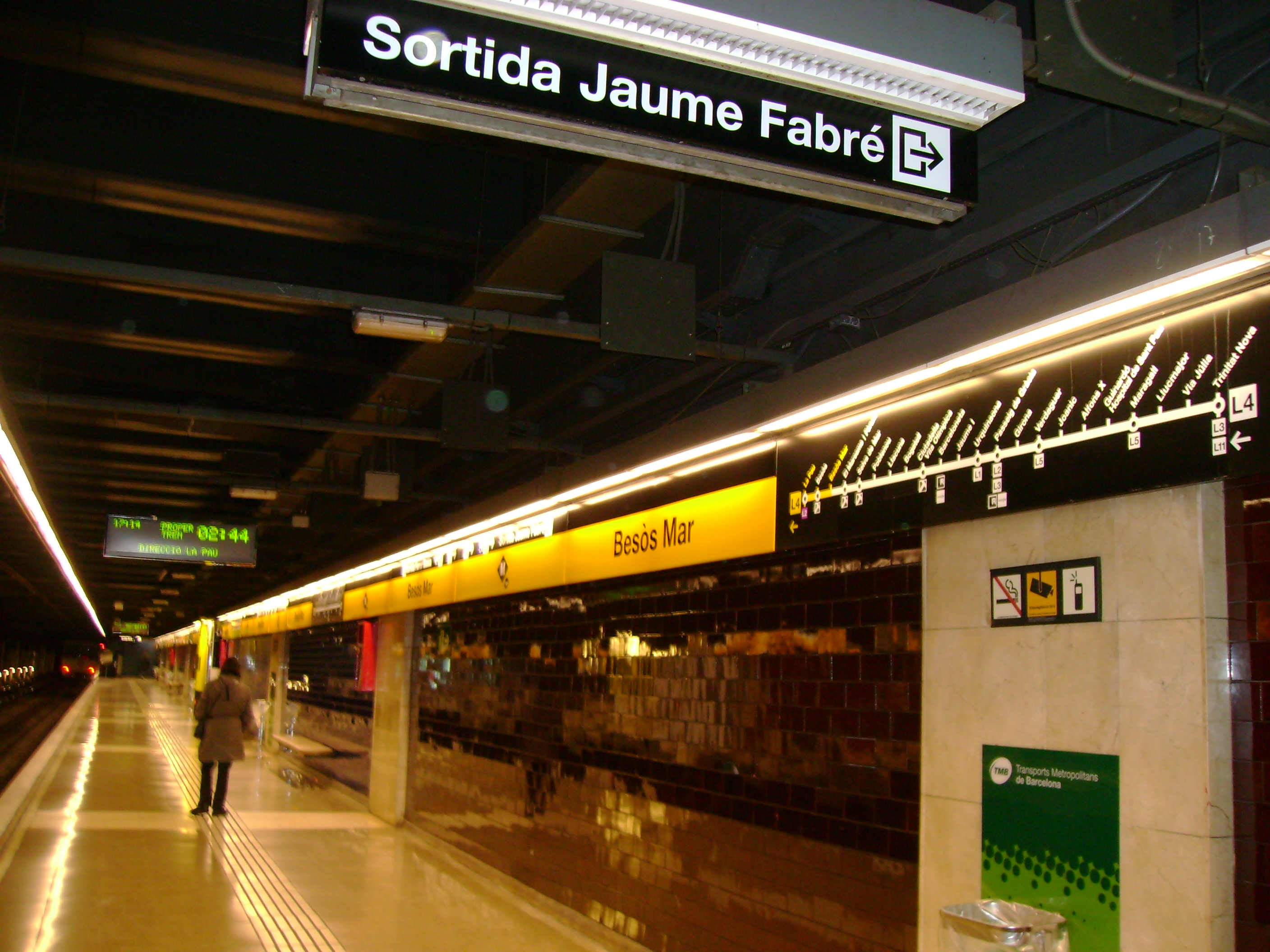
Besòs Mar station platform

Besòs Mar (Catalan pronunciation: [bəˈzɔz ˈmar]) Sant Martí district of Barcelona. It's served by L4. It was opened in 1982 (44 years ago) as La Mina, but it was controversially renamed with the construction of the Barcelona Fòrum and revamping of the adjacent area into Besòs Mar, alluding to the proximity to the Mediterranean Sea and to the Besòs river in order to diminish the reference to the neighbourhood's name which had become infamous. It's located underneath carrer d'Alfons el Magnànim between carrer de Lluís Borrassà and carrer de Ferrer Bassa.

== Services ==
Preceding station	Metro	Following station
El Maresme | Fòrum towards Trinitat Nova	L4	Besòs towards La Pau

== See also ==
- List of Barcelona Metro stations
