= Artigues/Sant Adrià station =

Barcelona Metro station

Coordinates: 41.433°N 2.217°E

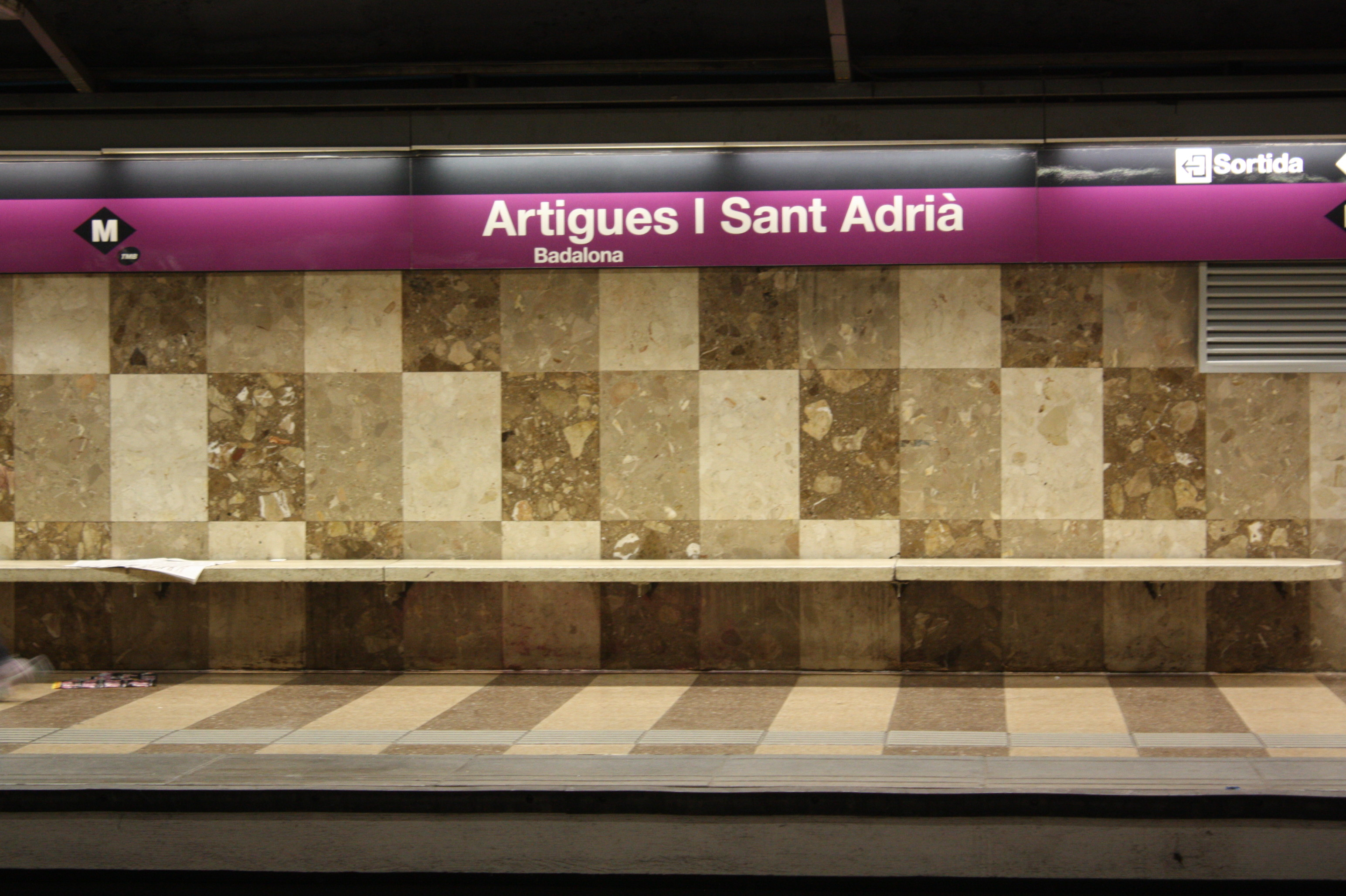
Signs at the station's platforms

Artigues | Sant Adrià (Catalan pronunciation: [ərˈtiɣəs ˈsant əðɾiˈa]) is a Barcelona Metro station in Badalona, named after the neighbourhood of the same name. Despite the latter part of the name, it is not in Sant Adrià del Besòs, and the tag Badalona was added to all signage in the station to avoid confusion. It is served by L2 (purple line). It opened in 1985 with the name Joan XXIII as part of L4 and became a L2 station in 2002. It can be accessed from Carretera de Santa Coloma and from Avinguda de Joan XXIII.

== Services ==
| Preceding station | Metro | Following station |
|---|---|---|
| Verneda towards Paral·lel | L2 | Sant Roc towards Badalona Pompeu Fabra |

== See also ==
- List of Barcelona Metro stations
