= El Carmel station =

Metro station in Barcelona, Spain

Coordinates: 41°25′29″N 2°09′19″E

El Carmel

General information
- Location: Spain
- System: Metro station
- Operator: Barcelona Metro
- Line: L5

History
- Opened: 30 July 2010
Location

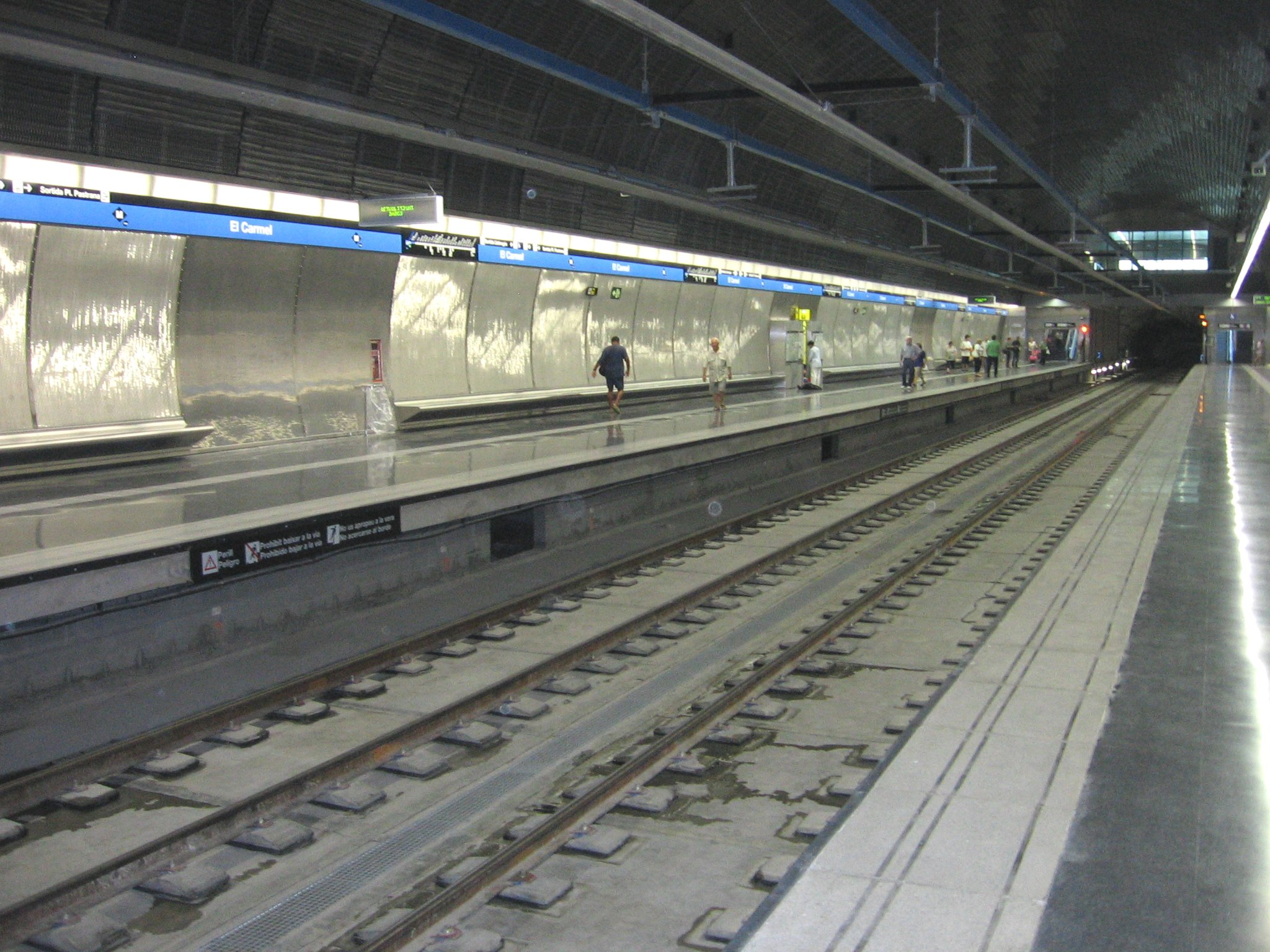
El Carmel station platforms

El Carmel (Catalan pronunciation: [əl kərˈmɛl]) is a station on the Barcelona metro network, served by L5. It is part of the extension that opened on 30 July 2010.

== See also ==
- List of Barcelona Metro stations

Preceding station	Metro	Following station
Horta towards Cornellà Centre	L5	El Coll | La Teixonera towards Vall d'Hebron
