= Javier Pérez Andújar =

Spanish writer (born 1965)

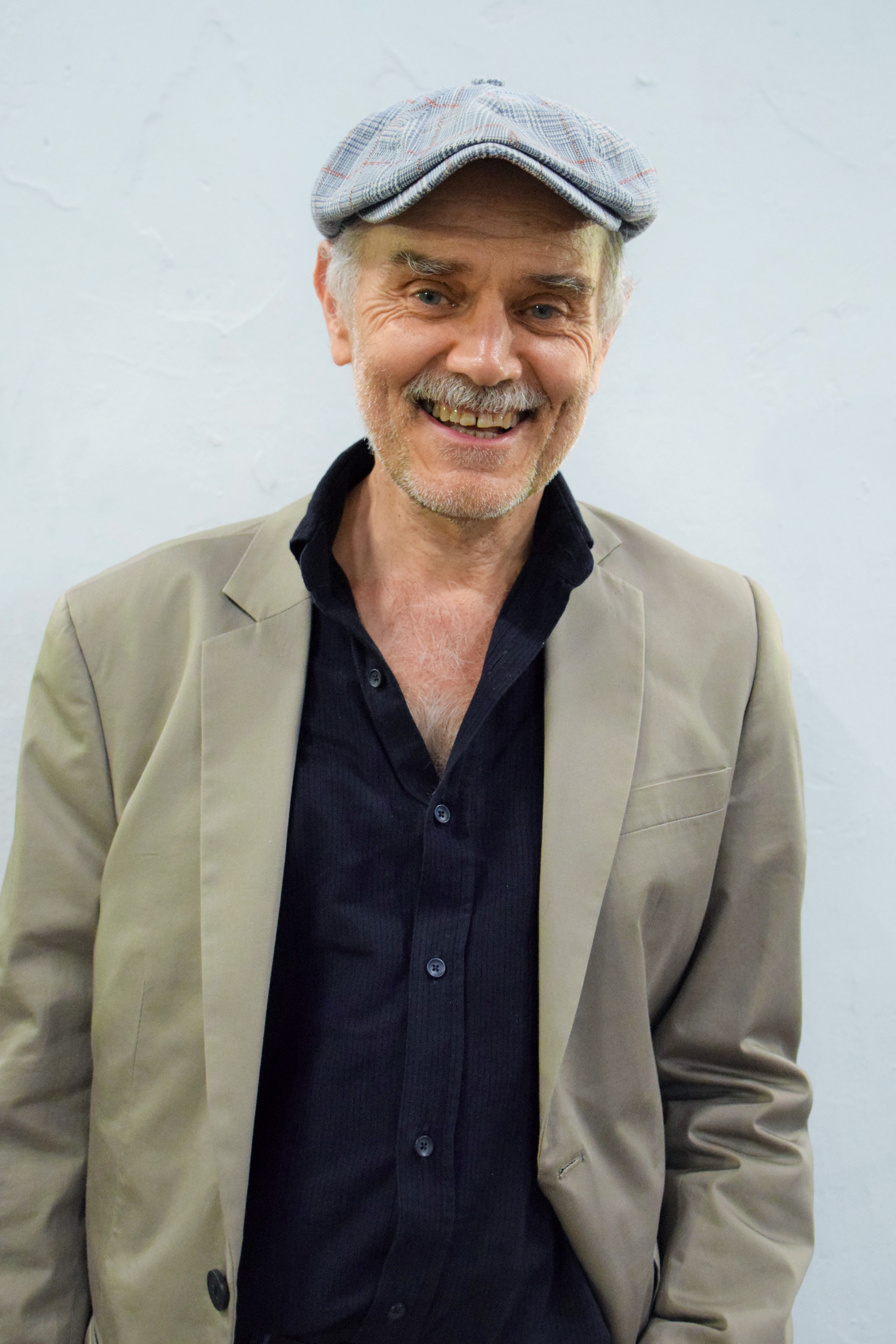
- Pérez Andújar in 2024
- Born: Javier Pérez Andújar; 1951 (age 73–74) Sant Adrià de Besòs, Spain
- Occupation: Novelist; columnist

Javier Pérez Andújar (born 1965, Sant Adrià de Besòs) is a Spanish writer. He is a graduate in Hispanic Philology from the University of Barcelona. His books include

- Los príncipes valientes
- Todo lo que se llevó el diablo
- Paseos con mi madre, Milagro en Barcelona (photos by Joan Guerrero)
- Catalanes todos
- Diccionario enciclopédico de la vieja escuela.

He writes for El País and participates in the radio program A vivir que son dos dias (Cadena SER). He was also part of the team of the television programs Saló de Lectura (Barcelona Televisió) and L'hora del lector (TV3). For his chronicles in the Catalan edition of El País, he received the City of Barcelona Media Award in 2014, and in 2016 he won the Premio Estado Crítico for essays for his book Diccionario enciclopédico de la vieja escuela. In 2021, he won the prestigious Premio Herralde for his novel El año del Búfalo.
