= Rambla Just Oliveras station =

Metro station in Barcelona, Spain

Rambla Just Oliveras
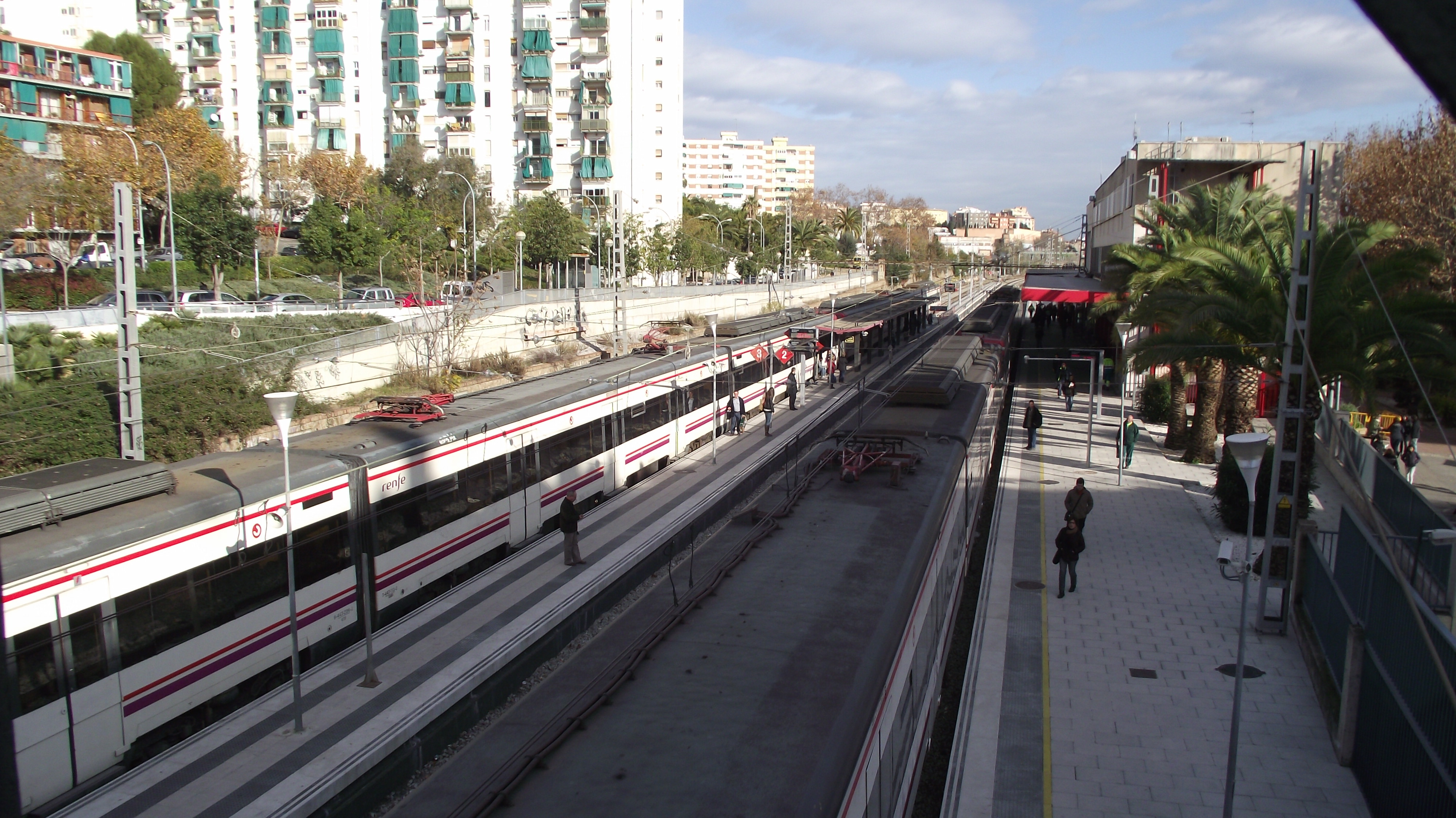

General information
- Location: L'Hospitalet de Llobregat
- Coordinates: 41.3633°N 2.1°E
- System: Barcelona Metro rapid transit station
- Owner: Transports Metropolitans de Barcelona

Construction
- Structure type: Underground

Other information
- Fare zone: 1 (ATM)

History
- Opened: 1987; 39 years ago

Services
Preceding station	Metro	Following station
Avinguda Carrilet towards Hospital de Bellvitge	L1	Can Serra towards Fondo
Location
- Location within Barcelona Location within Province of Barcelona Location within Spain

Rambla Just Oliveras (Catalan pronunciation: [ˈramblə ˈʒust uliˈβeɾəs]) is a Barcelona Metro station, in the L'Hospitalet de Llobregat municipality of the Barcelona metropolitan area, and named after the nearby street of Rambla Just Oliveras. The station is served by line L1, and is adjacent to the L'Hospitalet de Llobregat railway station, the main Rodalies Barcelona and mid-distance transport hub in the area.

The station is located under Rambla Just Oliveras between the Carrer de Parral and Avinguda de Can Serra. It can be accessed from entrances on the Rambla Just Oliveras, on the Avinguda de Can Serra and adjacent to the entrance to the mainline station on the Carrer dels Alps. All three entrances serve a common underground ticket hall, which gives access to two 95-metre (312 ft) long side platforms on a lower level.

The station opened in 1987, when line L1 was extended from Torrassa station to Avinguda Carrilet station.

== See also ==
- List of Barcelona Metro stations
- Transport in L'Hospitalet de Llobregat
