= Avinguda Tibidabo station =

Metro station in Barcelona, Spain

Avinguda Tibidabo
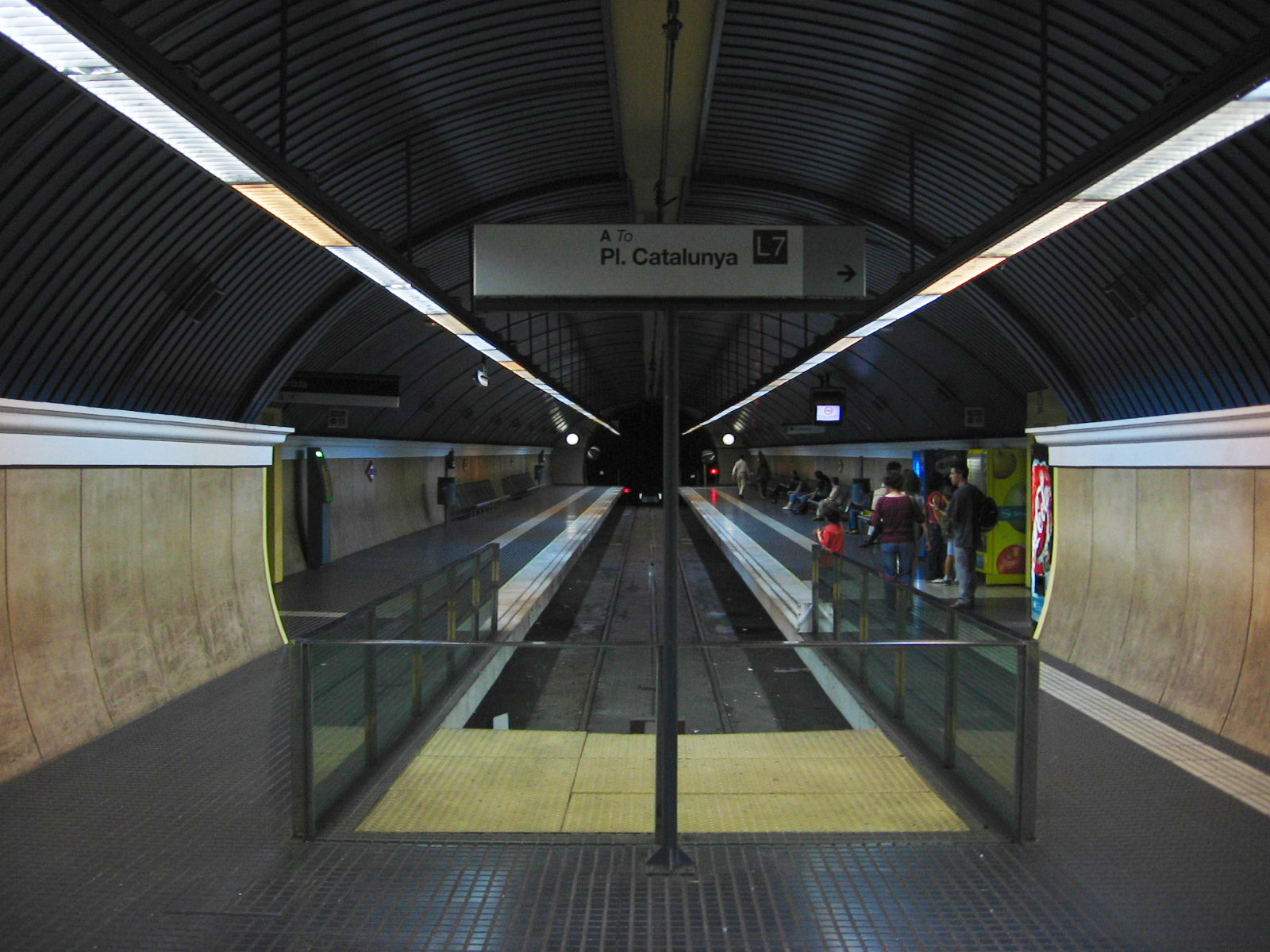
- Platforms at Avinguda Tibidabo

General information
- Location: Plaça de John F. Kennedy; Barcelona
- Coordinates: 41°24′36″N 2°08′13″E
- System: Barcelona Metro rapid transit station
- Owner: Ferrocarrils de la Generalitat de Catalunya
- Platforms: 2 side platforms
- Tracks: 1

Construction
- Structure type: Underground
- Accessible: yes

Other information
- Fare zone: 1 (ATM)

History
- Opened: 1954

Passengers
- 2018: 1,638,732

Services
Preceding station	FGC	Following station
El Putxet towards Barcelona Pl. Catalunya	L7	Terminus
Location

Avinguda Tibidabo (Catalan pronunciation: [əβiŋˈɡuðə tiβiˈðaβu]) is a station of the Barcelona Metro and is the terminus of FGC-operated line L7 (also known as Línia de Balmes). The station is situated under Carrer de Balmes at Plaça de John F. Kennedy, the former street's junction with the Avinguda Tibidabo and Passeig de Sant Gervasi.

The station was opened in 1954, along with the rest of the branch from the junction at Gràcia station. It has a single terminal track, which ends at a buffer within the station. Just outside the Gràcia end of the station, this track diverges into the twin running tracks of the L7. The terminal track is flanked on both sides by 66 metres (217 ft) long platforms, which can accommodate a three car train.

A concourse at the terminal end of the station is linked by four lifts or a long stairway to a subsurface ticket hall under Plaça de John F. Kennedy. This has a single entrance, in the centre of the square. Here connection is made with the historic Tramvia Blau, which provides a link to the Funicular del Tibidabo and hence Tibidabo itself. Several bus routes also serve the station.

== See also ==
- List of Barcelona Metro stations
- List of railway stations in Barcelona
