= El Coll/La Teixonera station =

Barcelona Metro station

Coordinates: 41°25′13″N 2°08′59″E

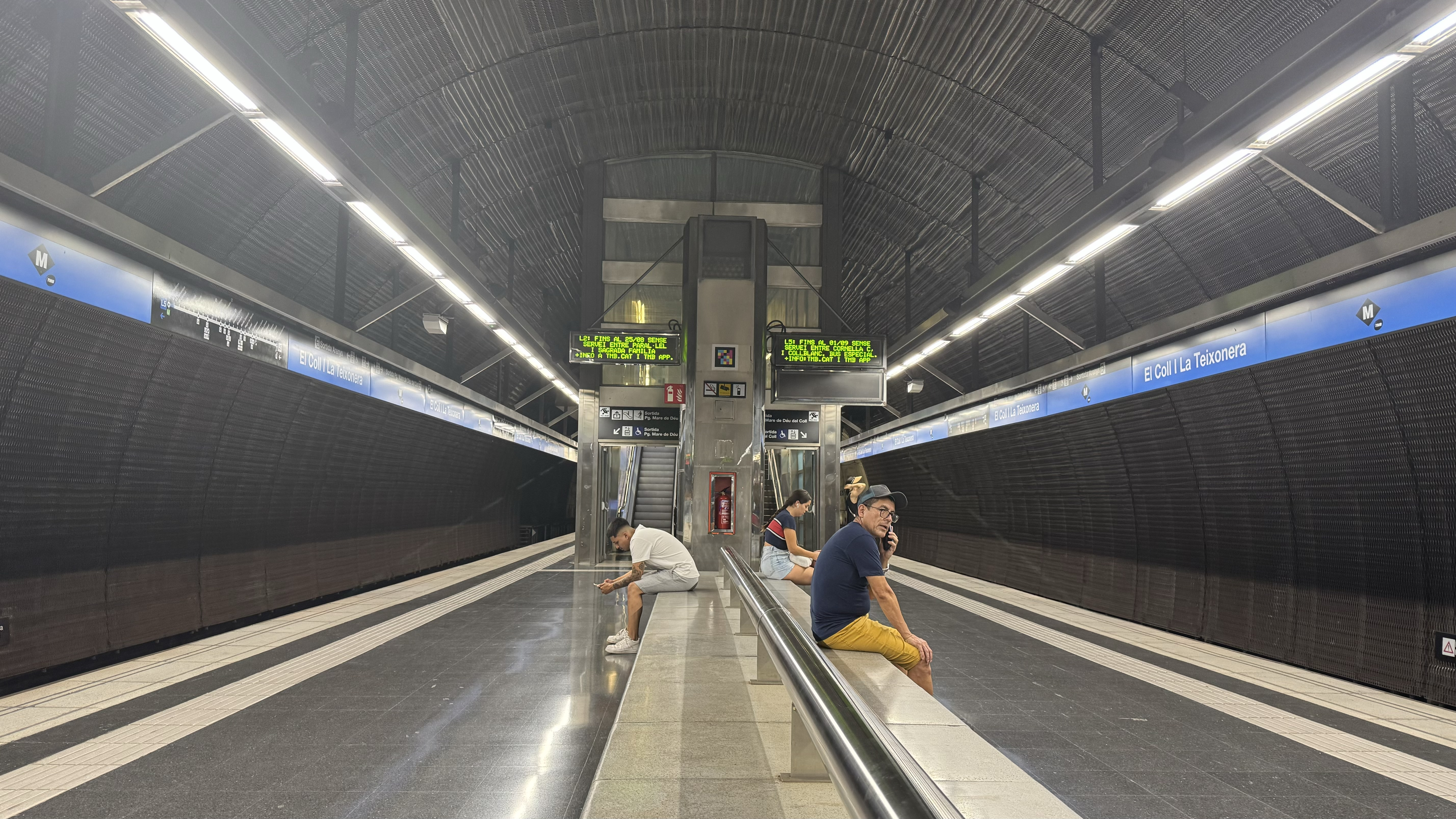
El Coll│La Teixonera station platform

El Coll | La Teixonera (Catalan pronunciation: [əl ˈkɔʎ lə təʃuˈneɾə]) is a Barcelona metro station located in the Horta-Guinardó district. The station opened on 30 July 2010 as part of a 3 station extension to line 5.

It is situated on the border between three neighbourhoods, El Carmel, La Teixonera and El Coll. As its name suggest it mainly serves the two neighbourhoods El Coll and La Teixonera even though one of the three station entrances is located in the neighbourhood El Carmel. The station situated under a steep hill, holds various records for Barcelona metro. The eastern entrance serving the neighbourhoods El Coll and El Carmel has the highest elevated station entrance on the whole network at 181.60 metres (596 feet) above sea level (one elevator though reaches an unspecified height of around 189 meters or 620 feet above sea level), the station also includes the longest lift on the whole network with 63 metres (207 feet).

The station also has the highest number of moving walkways (12) for any station in Barcelona. The height difference between the platform and the eastern street level entrance is larger than on any other station on the network with 73.53 metres (241 feet) and 80+ metres including the unspecified elevator, the platform is located 108.1 metres (354 feet) above sea level. Directly east of the station the metro runs deeper than anywhere else on the network, 105 metres under ground. The east and the west station entrances are the most spaced apart on the whole network, over 400 metres (1300 feet) by foot.

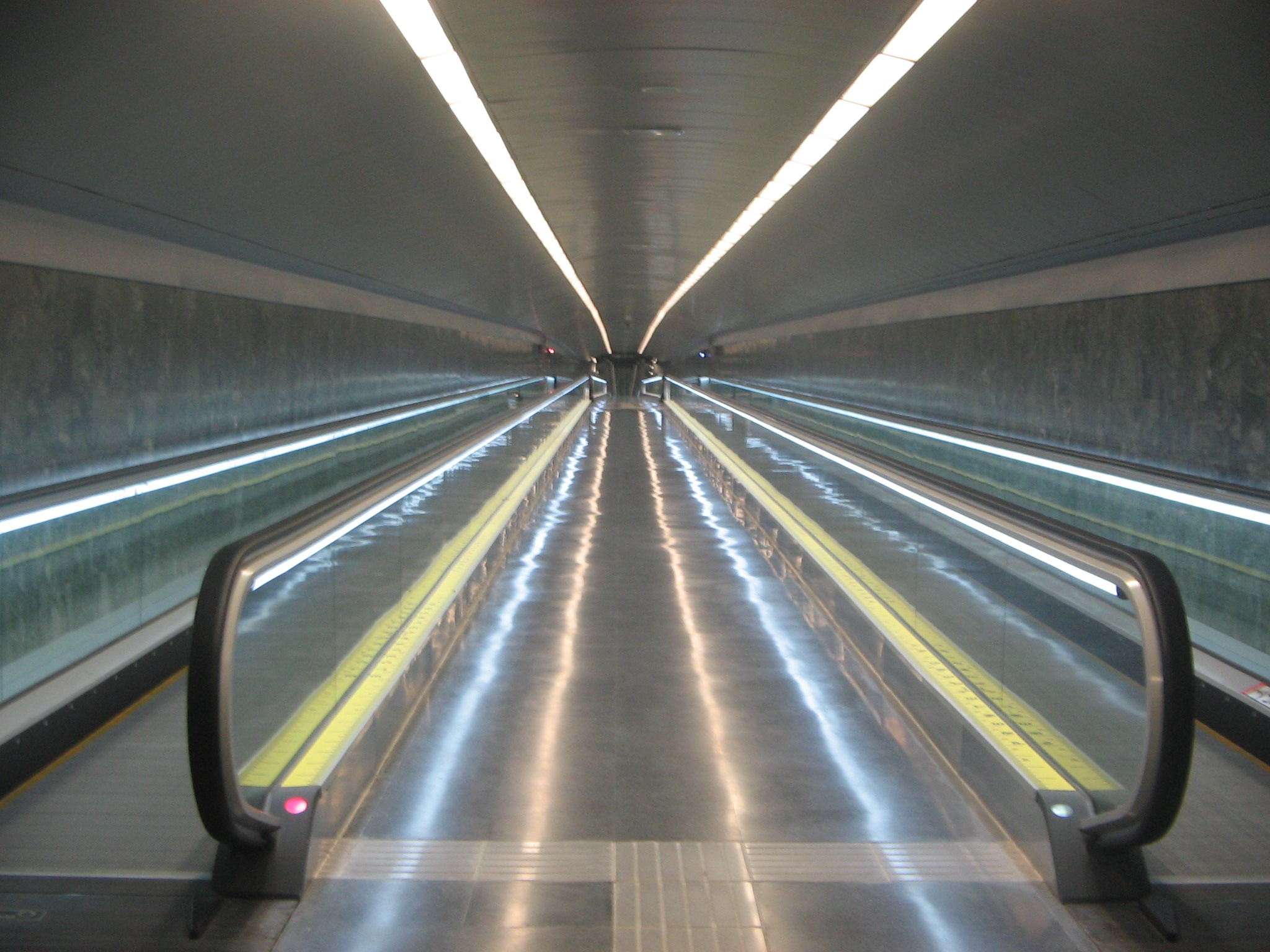
Several moving walkways are installed in the station.

== Services ==
Preceding station	Metro	Following station
El Carmel towards Cornellà Centre	L5	Vall d'Hebron Terminus

== See also ==
- List of Barcelona Metro stations
