= Verneda station =

Metro station in Barcelona, Spain

Coordinates: 41.430°N 2.210°E

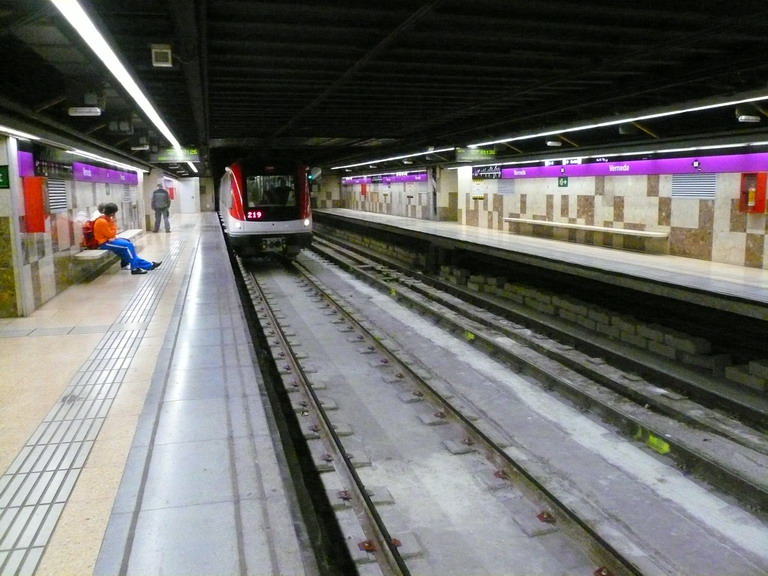
Inside the station.

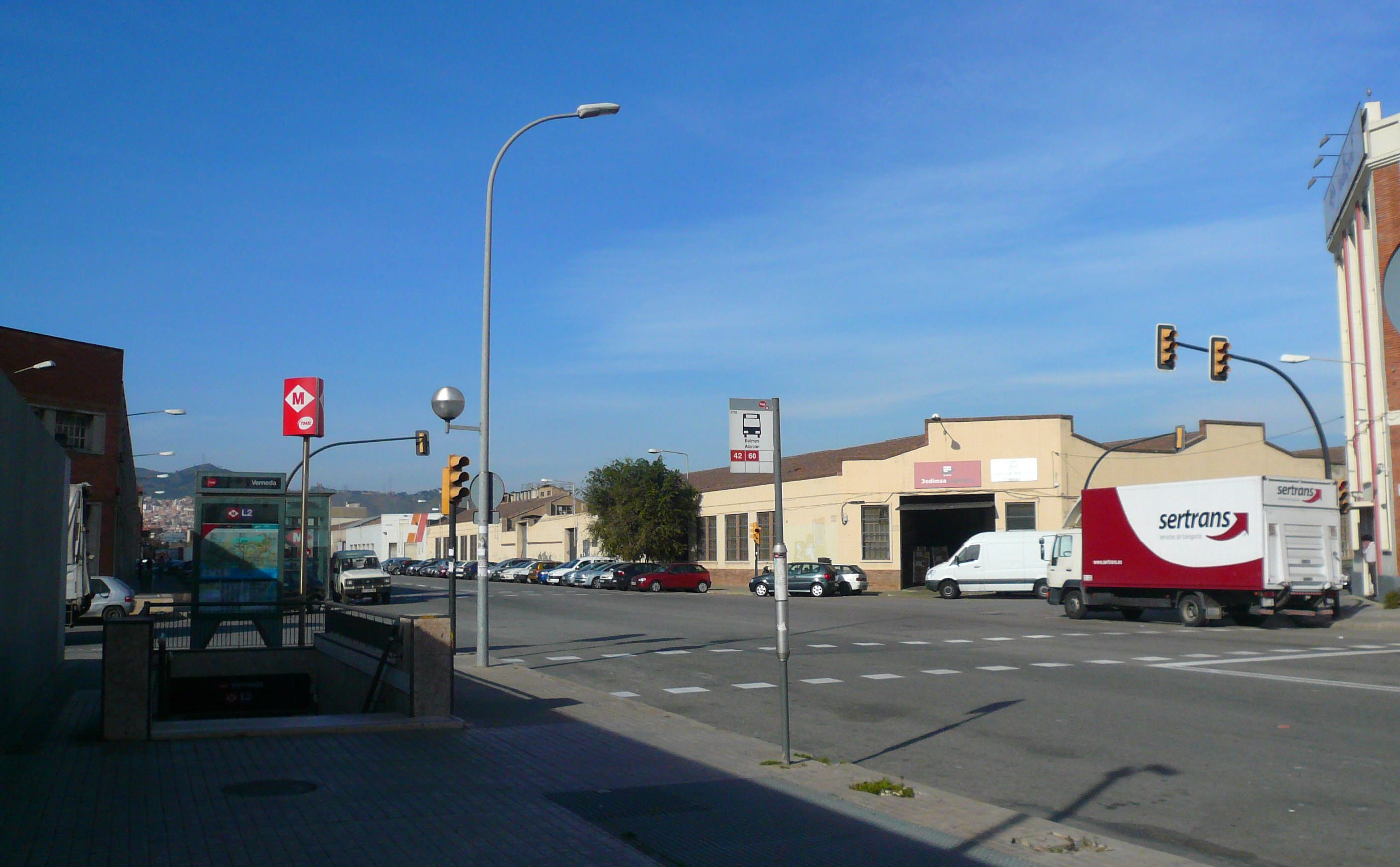
Entrance to the station.

Verneda (Catalan pronunciation: [bərˈnɛðə]) is a Barcelona Metro station in the Verneda neighbourhood of Sant Adrià de Besòs, a suburb of Barcelona. It's served by L2. It was opened in 1985 and was part of L4 back then, until a major change in both lines took place in 2002 to ease transportation from Badalona to Barcelona. The platforms are 93 m. long.

== Services ==
Preceding station	Metro	Following station
La Pau towards Paral·lel	L2	Artigues | Sant Adrià towards Badalona Pompeu Fabra

== See also ==
- List of Barcelona Metro stations
