= Can Serra station =

Metro station in Barcelona, Spain

Can Serra
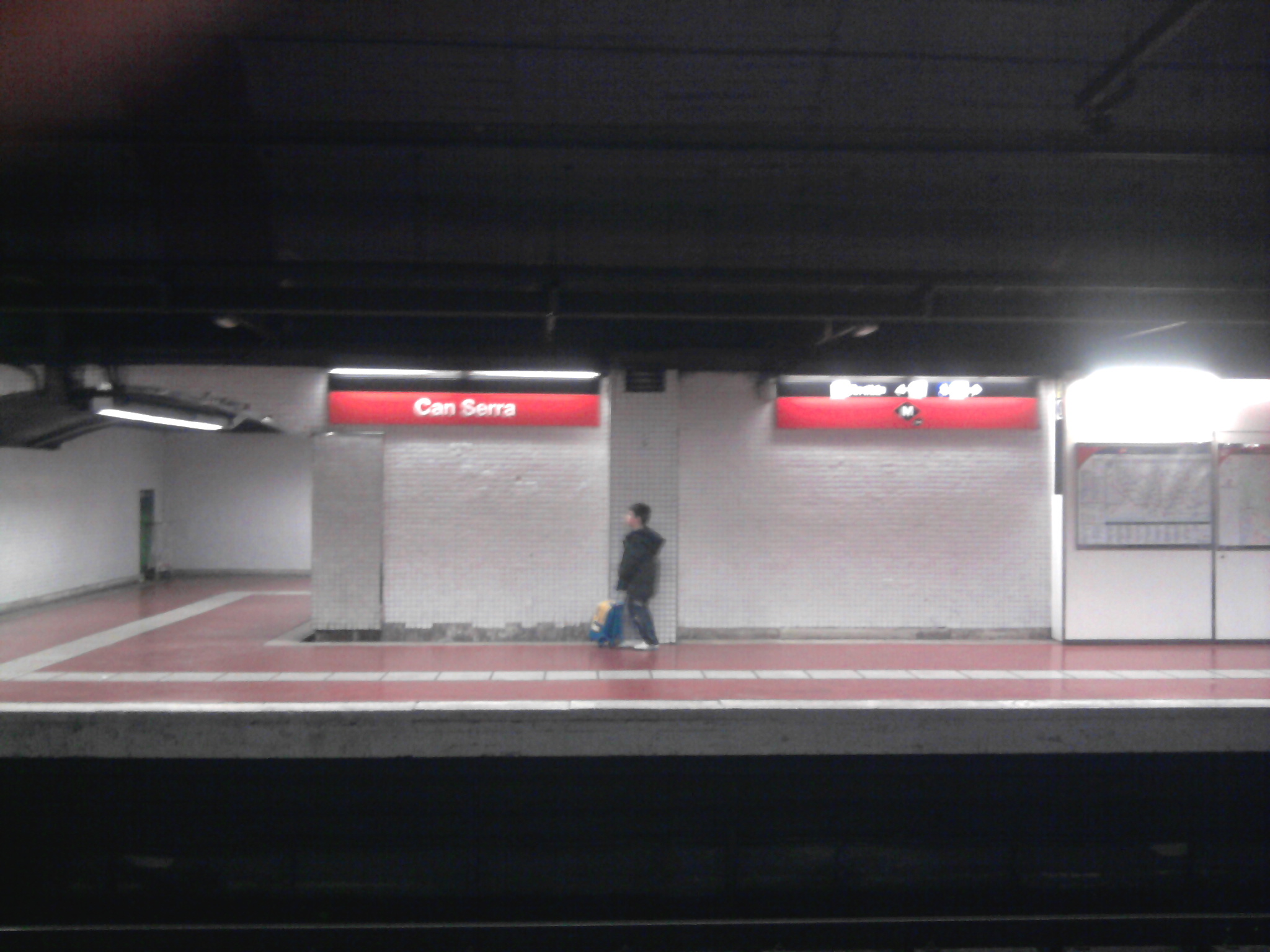

General information
- Location: L'Hospitalet de Llobregat
- Coordinates: 41°22′2″N 2°6′11″E
- System: Barcelona Metro rapid transit station
- Owner: Transports Metropolitans de Barcelona

Construction
- Structure type: Underground

Other information
- Fare zone: 1 (ATM)

History
- Opened: 1987; 39 years ago

Services
Preceding station	Metro	Following station
Rambla Just Oliveras towards Hospital de Bellvitge	L1	Florida towards Fondo
Location
- Location within Barcelona Location within Spain

Can Serra (Catalan pronunciation: [ˈkan ˈsɛrə]) is a Barcelona Metro station, in the L'Hospitalet de Llobregat municipality of the Barcelona metropolitan area, and named after the nearby Can Serra neighbourhood. The station is served by line L1.

The station is located under Parc de les Planes between the Carrer de Molí and the Avinguda d'Isabel la Catòlica. There are entrances from both the park and from Avinguda de Can Serra, which serve an underground ticket hall. The two 96-metre (315 ft) long side platforms are at a lower level.

The station opened in 1987, when line L1 was extended from Torrassa station to Avinguda Carrilet station.

== See also ==
- List of Barcelona Metro stations
- Transport in L'Hospitalet de Llobregat
