= Plaça del Centre station =

Metro station in Barcelona, Spain

Plaça del Centre
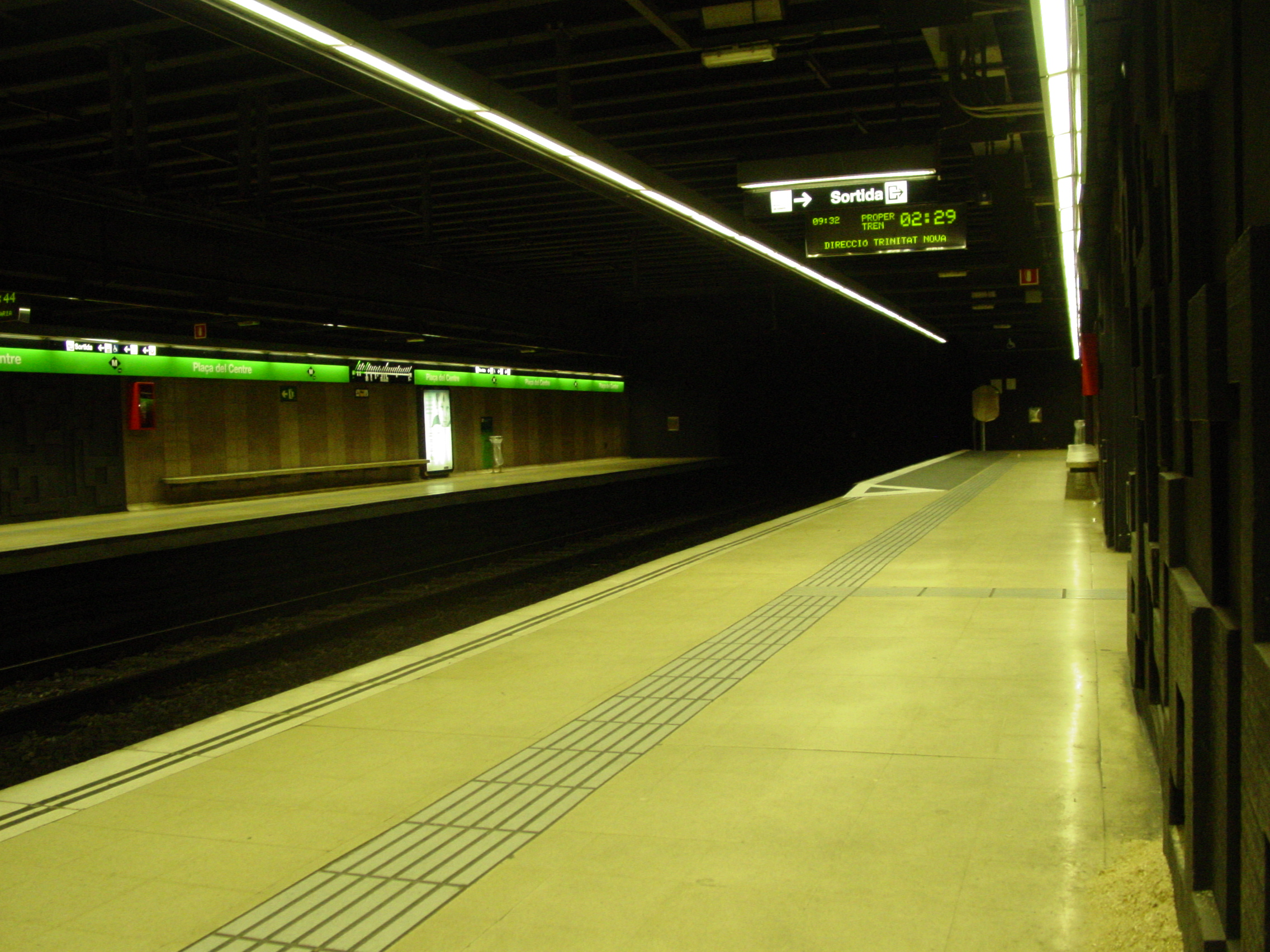
- Platform view of Placa del Centre station

General information
- Location: Barcelona (Sants-Montjuïc/Les Corts)
- Coordinates: 41°22′55″N 2°8′9″E
- System: Barcelona Metro rapid transit station
- Operator: Transports Metropolitans de Barcelona
- Platforms: 2 side platforms

Other information
- Fare zone: 1 (ATM)

History
- Opened: 1975

Services
Preceding station	Metro	Following station
Les Corts towards Zona Universitària	L3	Sants Estació towards Trinitat Nova
Location
- Location within Barcelona Location within Spain

Plaça del Centre (Catalan pronunciation: [ˈplasə ðəl ˈsentɾə]), also known as Plaza del Centro, is a station in the Barcelona Metro network, on the border between the Les Corts and Sants-Montjuïc districts of Barcelona. It is served by line L3 (green line).

The station takes its name from a nearby square, and is located in the intersection of the streets Avinguda de Madrid, Carrer de Berlin, Carrer dels Comtes de Bell-lloc and Carrer de Vallespir, a short walk away from the major railway station Estació de Sants. The station's two side platforms are 94 metres (308 ft) long.

The station opened in 1975, along with the other stations of the section of L3 between Zona Universitària and Sants Estació stations. This section was originally operated separately from L3, and known as L3b, until the two sections were joined in 1982. When opened, the station was known by the Spanish-language name Plaza del Centro, but 1982 the name was adapted to its current Catalan language form.

== See also ==
- List of Barcelona Metro stations
