= Artigues, Badalona =

Human settlement in Spain

Coordinates: 41.4336°N 2.2198°E

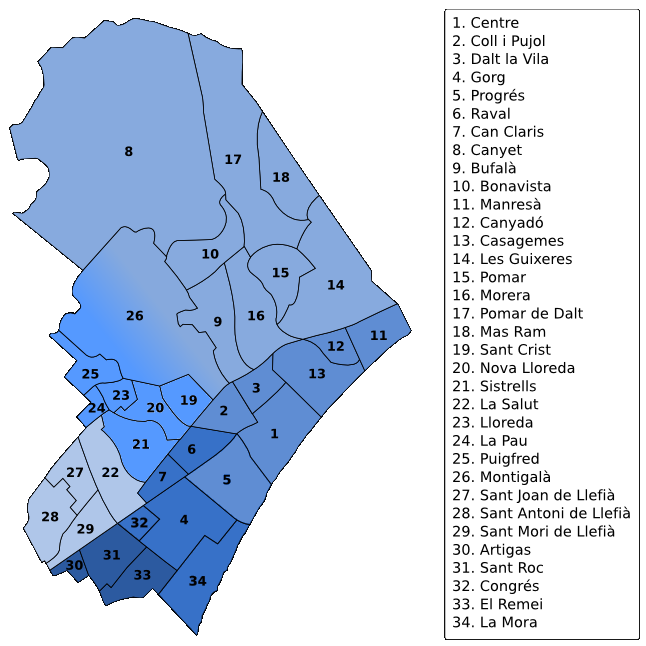
Administrative divisions of Badalona.

Artigues (Catalan pronunciation: [ərˈtiɣəs]) is an area of Badalona (Barcelonès, Catalonia, Spain) neighbouring Sant Adrià de Besòs. The name derives from a real estate promoter and publisher, Francesc Artigas i Solà, who urbanised the area in 1912. The two spellings of the name reflect Catalan orthography before and after Pompeu Fabra's reform. It was also known as Colònia Artigas, following the convention used in similar industrial areas in the province of Barcelona, and even though officially in the municipality of Badalona, it was often considered to be very autonomous from it and closer to Sant Adrià de Besòs. Within Badalona, it's one of the neighbourhoods which make up the town's district 6. It's part of the innermost region of the metropolitan area of Barcelona, not far from Barcelona proper. Its administrative borders are four streets: carrer d'Alfons XIII, carrer de Bogatell, carrer de Covadonga and carrer de l'Onze de Setembre. The immigrant population of Artigues is important, and during political campaign, some political parties have used their stance on migration policies and management in Artigues as part of their discourse.

== Transport ==
The Barcelona Metro station Artigues | Sant Adrià, on L2, serves the area and other adjacent neighbourhoods. Some bus lines such as 44 and B25 provide a direct link between central Barcelona and Artigues. The Trambesòs station Encants de Sant Adrià is also not far from Artigues.
