= Sant Roc station =

Metro station in Barcelona, Spain

Coordinates: 41.435°N 2.228°E

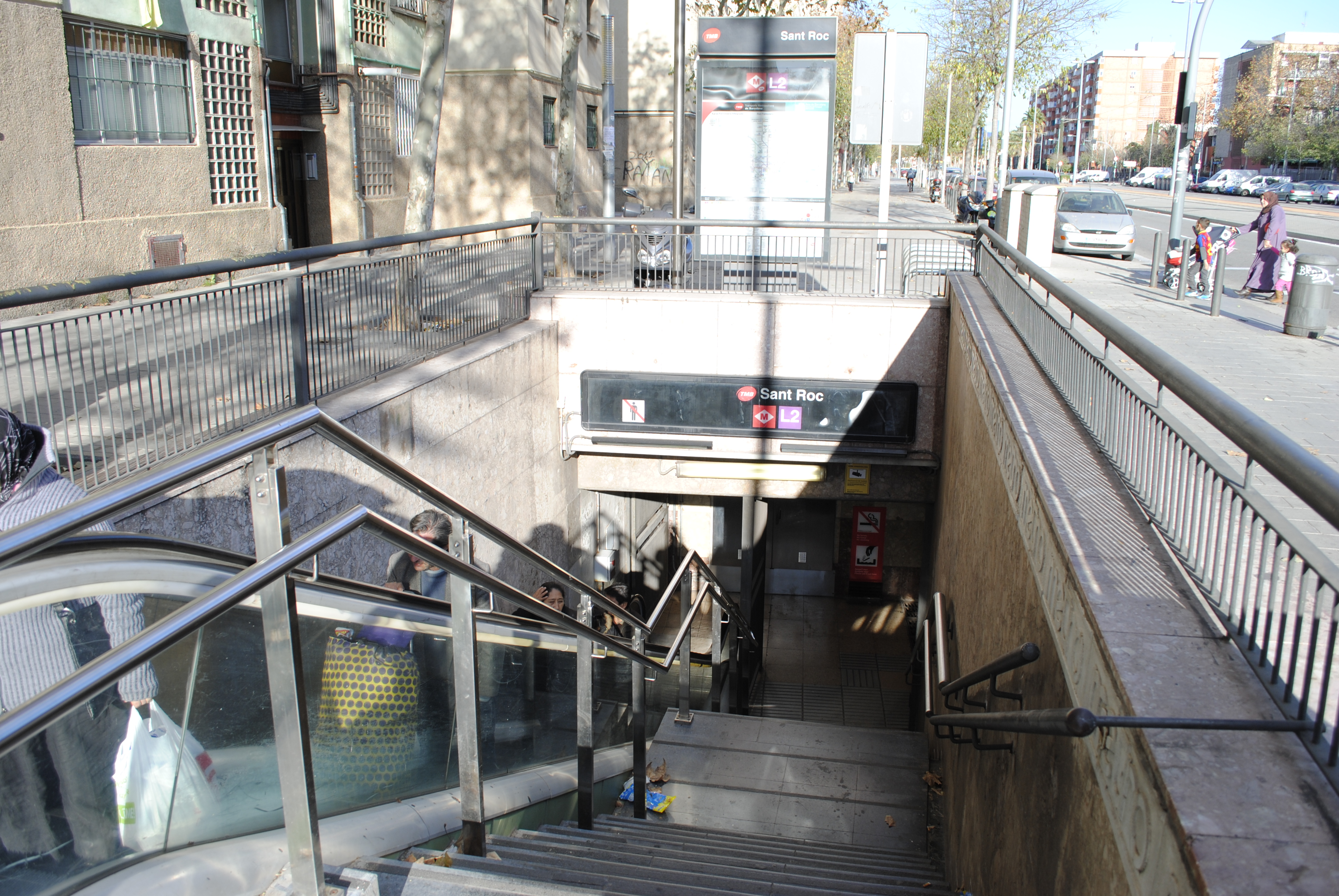
A station entrance

Sant Roc (Catalan pronunciation: [ˈsan ˈrɔk]) is a Barcelona Metro station in Sant Roc, a neighbourhood of the municipality of Badalona, in the metropolitan area of Barcelona. It's served by L2 and since 2007, by Trambesòs route T5. It was opened in 1985 as part of L4 and moved to L2 in 2002. It can be accessed from Plaça President Tarradellas and from Carrer Alfons XIII.

== Services ==
Preceding station	Metro	Following station
Artigues | Sant Adrià towards Paral·lel	L2	Gorg towards Badalona Pompeu Fabra

|}

== See also ==
- List of Barcelona Metro stations
