= Besòs station =

Metro station in Barcelona, Spain

Coordinates: 41°25′12.58″N 2°12′33.42″E

Besòs (Catalan pronunciation: [bəˈzɔs]) is a station of the Barcelona Metro, served by L4 (yellow line). It takes its name from the Besòs neighbourhood of Barcelona (named after the river Besòs), in the Sant Martí district. The station is located in the intersection of Gran Via de les Corts Catalanes, Carretera de Mataró and Rambla de Prim. It opened in 1982 (44 years ago). A connection with the Trambesòs line T5 was introduced in 2006 with the opening of the equally underground tram station.

== Services ==
Preceding station	Metro	Following station
Besòs Mar towards Trinitat Nova	L4	La Pau Terminus

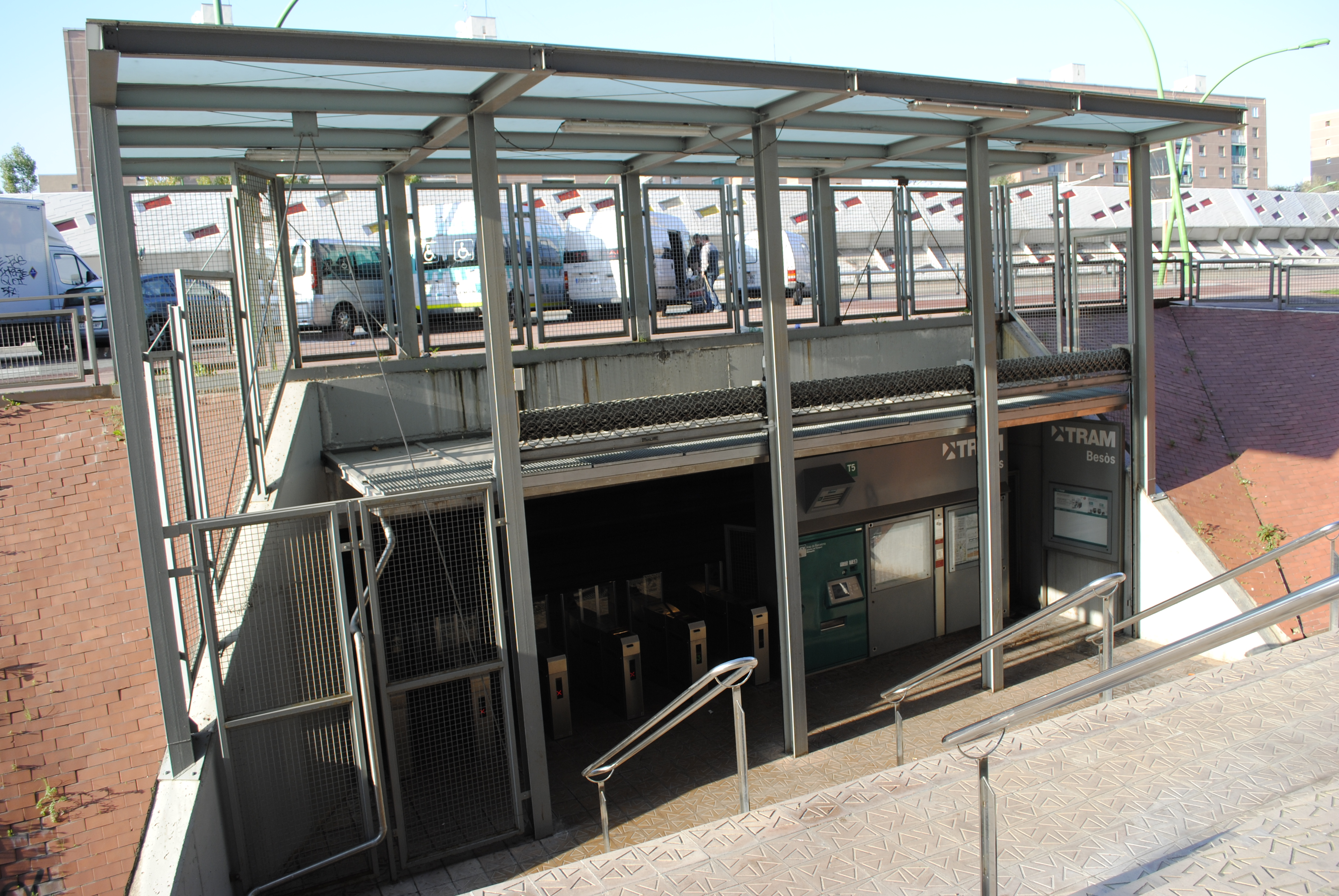
Besòs (Barcelona Metro)

== See also ==
- List of Barcelona Metro stations
