= El Maresme/Fòrum station =

Metro station in Barcelona, Spain

Coordinates: 41.412°N 2.217°E

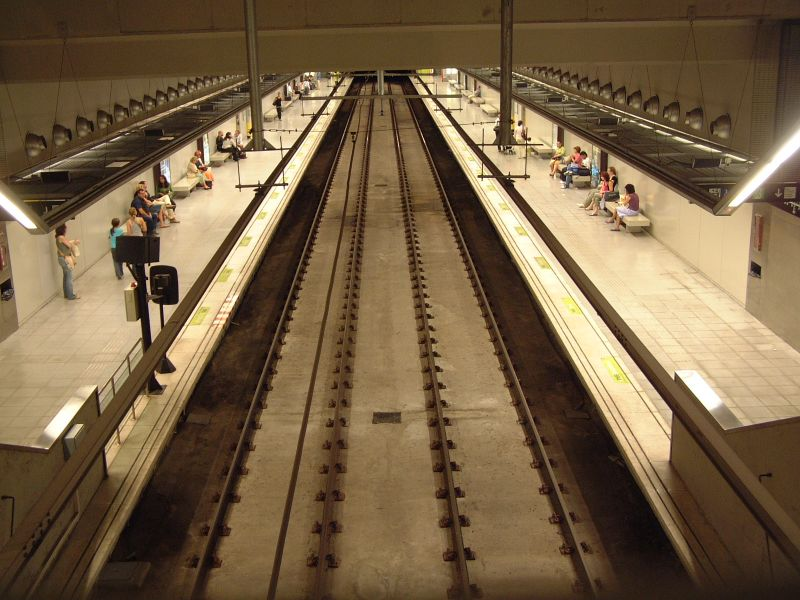
The station's platforms as seen from inside on one the accesses.

El Maresme | Fòrum (Catalan pronunciation: [əl məˈɾɛzmə ˈfɔɾum]) is a Barcelona Metro station located between Carrer del Maresme and Rambla de Prim, near the Forum site, in the Sant Martí district of Barcelona, Spain. It's served by L4 (yellow line), as well as providing a connection with the Trambesòs route T4. It was opened in 2003 (23 years ago), even though the section of the tunnel where the station is located has been in use since 1982.

It also serves Catalonia’s largest shopping centre, Diagonal Mar, and the surrounding area of the same name.

== Services ==
Preceding station	Metro	Following station
Selva de Mar towards Trinitat Nova	L4	Besòs Mar towards La Pau
