= Sant Roc =

Coordinates: 41.4348°N 2.2237°E

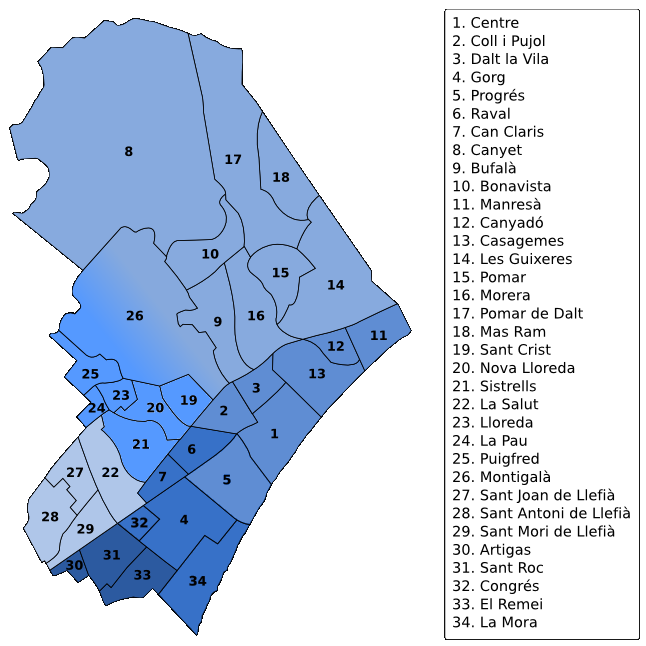
Administrative divisions of Badalona.

Sant Roc (Catalan pronunciation: [ˈsan ˈrɔk]; Spanish: San Roque) is a neighbourhood of Badalona, in the metropolitan area of Barcelona (Catalonia, Spain). In 1958 the Badalona city council planned construction on the site, under the name of Barrio del Regadío. It was urbanised beginning in December 1962 and originally inhabited by people resettled from slums in the Barcelona area, after damages caused by major floods. Still nowadays it has an important Roma presence. The Francoist housing organisation Obra Sindical del Hogar y Arquitectura was responsible for most of the construction in Sant Roc, mostly made up of tower blocks.

== Public transport ==
The Barcelona Metro station Sant Roc is located in the neighborhood. It is served by L2 and also by Trambesòs line T5.
