= Florida station (Barcelona) =

Barcelona Metro station

Florida
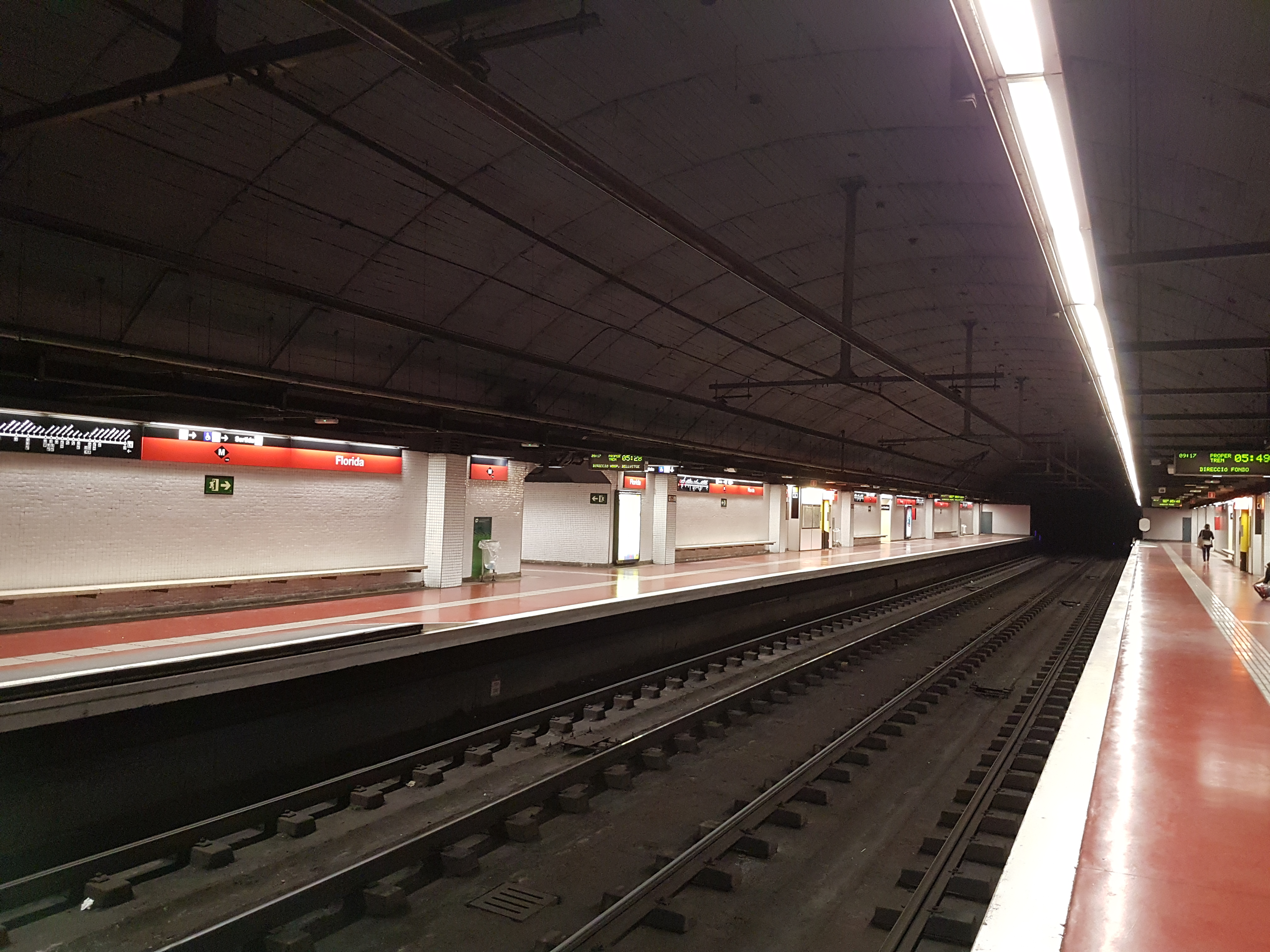
- The tracks and platforms at Florida station in 2018

General information
- Location: L'Hospitalet de Llobregat
- Coordinates: 41°22′05″N 2°06′42″E
- System: Barcelona Metro rapid transit station
- Owner: Transports Metropolitans de Barcelona

Construction
- Structure type: Underground

Other information
- Fare zone: 1 (ATM)

History
- Opened: 1987; 39 years ago

Services
Preceding station	Metro	Following station
Can Serra towards Hospital de Bellvitge	L1	Torrassa towards Fondo
Location
- Location within Barcelona Location within Spain

Florida (Catalan pronunciation: [fluˈɾiðə]) is a Barcelona Metro station, in the L'Hospitalet de Llobregat municipality of the Barcelona metropolitan area, and named after the nearby La Florida neighbourhood. The station is served by line L1.

The station is located below the Avinguda Catalunya, between the Carrer Ceravalls and Carrer Mimoses. It has two entrances, from the Plaça Blocs Florida and the Avinguda Masnou, which serve an underground ticket hall. The two 98-metre (322 ft) long side platforms are at a lower level.

The station opened in 1987, when line L1 was extended from Torrassa station to Avinguda Carrilet station.

== See also ==
- List of Barcelona Metro stations
- Transport in L'Hospitalet de Llobregat
