= Clot station (Barcelona Metro) =

Metro station in Barcelona, Spain

Coordinates: 41°24′31″N 2°11′12″E

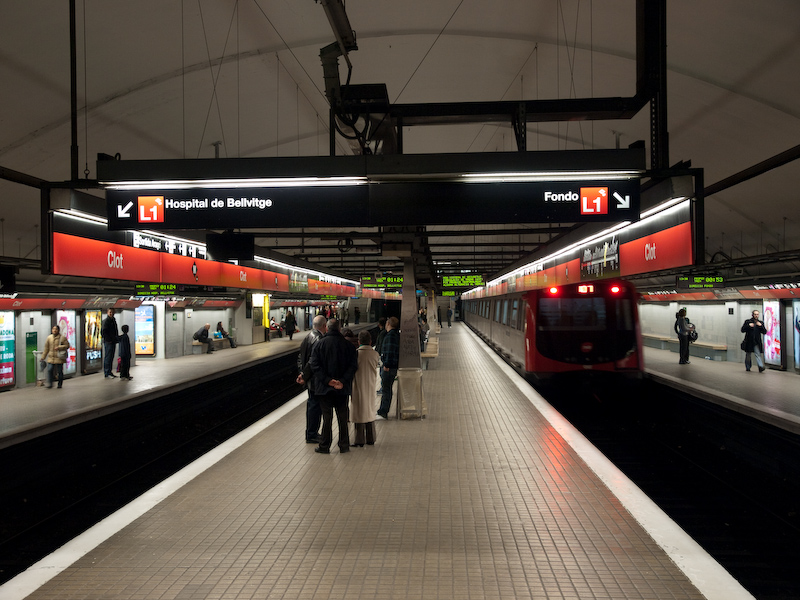
Line 1 Metro platforms in El Clot.

Clot (Catalan pronunciation: [ˈklɔt]) is a station serving line 1 and line 2 of the Barcelona Metro.

The Line 1 station, opened in 1951, was built below Avinguda Meridiana between Carrer Aragó and Carrer València, and is arranged according to the Spanish solution with both side and central platforms. The lower-level Line 2 station, opened in 1997, is below Carrer València, and opened with the rest of the line between Sagrada Família and La Pau.

The Rodalies de Catalunya station of the same name is connected to the metro station via the line 1 platforms. It offers connections to lines R1, R2 and R11.

== Services ==
Preceding station	Metro	Following station
Glòries towards Hospital de Bellvitge	L1	Navas towards Fondo
Encants towards Paral·lel	L2	Bac de Roda towards Badalona Pompeu Fabra
