= Sant Adrià de Besòs =

- Municipality
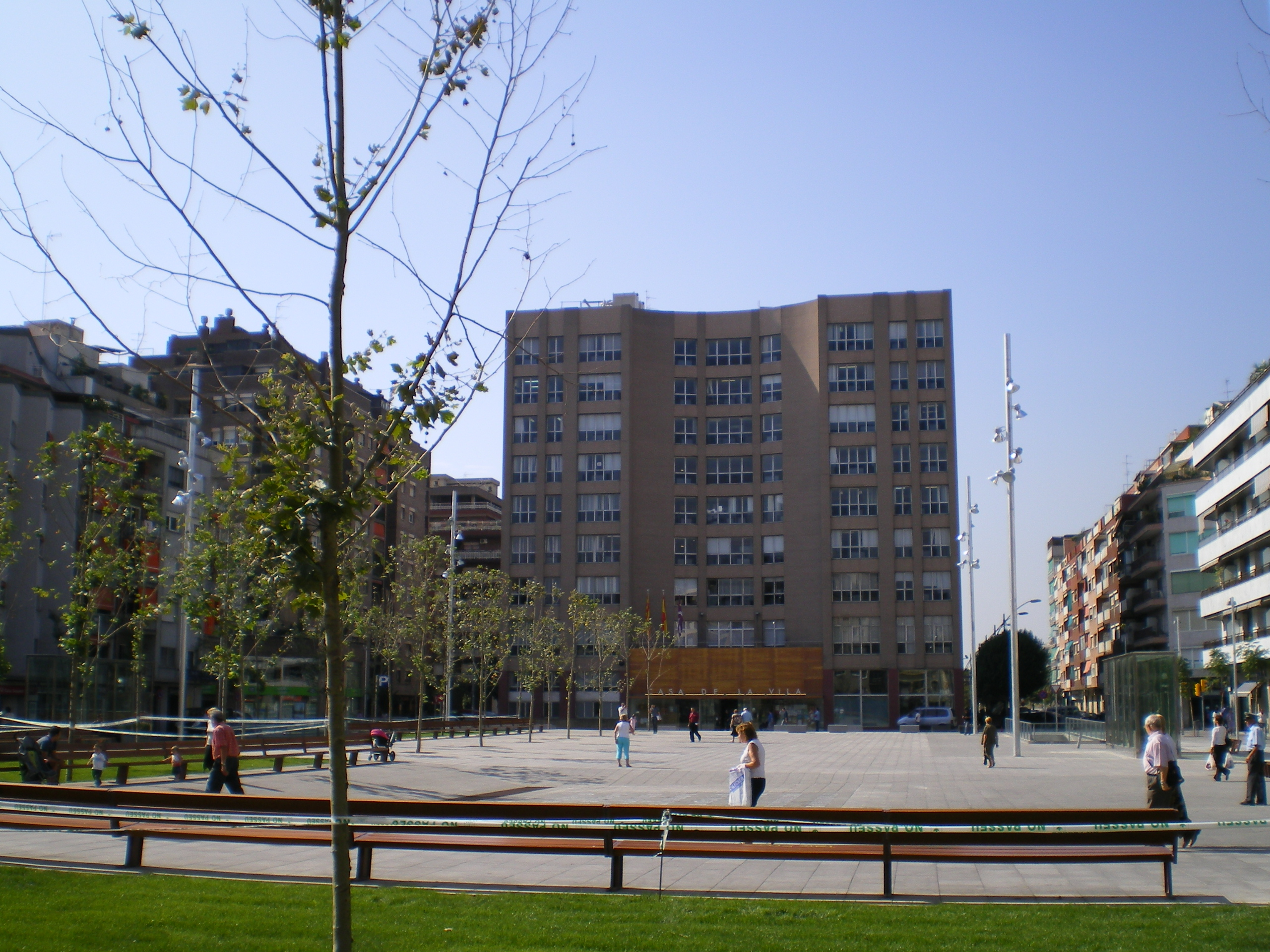
- Plaça de la Vila dominated by the city hall

- Flag Coat of arms

- Location in the Province of Barcelona Location inCatalonia Location in Spain
- Coordinates: 41.4285°N 2.223°E
- Country: Spain
- Community: Catalonia
- Province: Barcelona
- Comarca: Barcelonès
- Judicial district: Badalona
- Boroughs: 6 neighbourhoods: Sant Adrià Nord; Sant Joan Baptista; La Verneda; La Catalana; El Besòs; La Mina

Government
  - Type: Mayor–council
  - Body: Ajuntament de Sant Adrià de Besòs
  - Mayor: Joan Callau Bartolí (2015) (PSC)

Area
  - Total: 3.8 km^{2} (1.5 sq mi)
- Highest elevation: 14 m (46 ft)
- Lowest elevation: 0 m (0 ft)

Population (2025-01-01)
  - Total: 39,323
  - Density: 10,000/km^{2} (27,000/sq mi)
- Demonym(s): Adrianenc, adrianenca (ca); Adrianense (es)
- Postal code: 08930
- Area code(s): (+34) 93 381
- Statistical code: 081944
- Website: www.sant-adria.net

Sant Adrià de Besòs (Catalan pronunciation: [ˌsant əðɾiˈa ðə βəˈzɔs]) is a city and a municipality within the comarca of Barcelonès in Catalonia, north-eastern Spain. It is situated on the Mediterranean coast, at the mouth of river Besòs, extending to both sides of the estuary although the original settlement with the parish church lies on the left bank of the river, in the northern part of town. Sant Adrià is the smallest municipality of Barcelonès and has close ties with the neighbouring cities of Barcelona, Badalona and Santa Coloma de Gramenet, forming a uniform urban area within Barcelona metropolitan area.

The municipality straddles major transportation networks and is served by several modes of public transport. Sant Adrià is currently a town dominated by the service sector, but with a diverse manufacturing sector (especially in the areas of metal-work, chemistry, and construction) consisting mostly of medium-sized companies. Historically, it has experienced several massive migration flows attracted by the important industrialisation of the area during the last century and has been subject of various major urban redevelopments. In 2004, Sant Adrià de Besòs was part of the Universal Forum of Cultures.

== History ==
The origins of the town are linked to the parish church of Sant Adrià de Besòs, which was referred to in 1012, where in about 1092 a priory of Augustinian monks, dependants of Sant Ruf d'Avinyo, was founded. Saint Olegarius (San José María de Porcioles) came to this priory from 1095 to 1108 before becoming the bishop of Barcelona and, later, the archbishop of Tarragona. In 1127 the priory was moved to Santa Maria de Terrassa. Surrounding this church, upon a small hill fourteen metres high, to the west of the River Besòs, is the nucleus of the original village.

== Transport ==
Given its proximity to the city of Barcelona, Sant Adrià de Besòs is well served by road, rail and many other forms of public transport, becoming an important part of the transportation network in Barcelona metropolitan area. The city has always been an economically unprivileged town and a really dense area, and it remained indifferent to the establishment and the improvement of public transport around Barcelona for many years, but the recent development in public infrastructures and urban renewals has brought substantial transport improvement, especially in the form of tram services.

C-31 highway comes directly from Plaça de les Glòries Catalanes in Barcelona to Mataró and intersects perpendicularly with Ronda del Litoral (B-10 motorway) in the middle of town, forming a major highway interchange, and allowing B-10 to be linked with Ronda de Dalt (B-20 motorway) at Nus de la Trinitat, another major highway interchange in northern Barcelona. Other main roads serving Sant Adrià include the national route N-II parallel to Maresme's coastline and the local road BV-5001 towards Montornès del Vallès and La Roca del Vallès, crossing the northern part of the municipality.

A tram of the Trambesòs network in Sant Adrià

Public transportation network is mainly composed of several urban and interurban bus routes that provide a good internal connection within the municipality as well as the connection of the city to other nearby cities within the comarca. Currently, 16 bus routes run through the municipality, 5 of them are local bus routes operated by Transports Metropolitans de Barcelona (TMB) to and from Barcelona, 8 are interurban routes within Barcelonès, and 3 are night routes. With regard to rail transport modes, Trambesòs is the most prominent transport system in Sant Adrià which comprises 7 stops within the municipality served by all its routes, linking the city to the district of Sant Martí up to Parc de la Ciutadella in Barcelona. Maresme Line also runs through the city with Sant Adrià de Besòs railway station as the only stop of the line in town which lies in the eastern part of Sant Adrià and is served by Rodalies de Catalunya commuter rail line R1. Verneda is the only Barcelona Metro station officially located in the municipality, but Artigues – Sant Adrià station is as its name says also meant to serve Sant Adrià de Besòs because although being located in Badalona, it is just a few meters from the city limits.

== Places of interest ==
- History of Immigration in Catalonia Museum (MhiC): This museum aims to analyse the history of the migratory processes related to Catalonia, mainly from the Iberian Peninsula. It comprises a hall for temporary exhibitions as well as a documentation center, a virtual museum and El Sevillano, a restored passenger railcar used during the 1950s and 1960s by many immigrants to get to Barcelona from southern Spain.
- Parish Church of Sant Adrià de Besòs: Built during the 1940s, this church consists of a building with a brick veneer façade, and a large nave which has chapels on each side, a semicircular apse and a dome. The façade is flanked by two towers, of which the highest one is the bell tower.
- Air-raid shelter: The air-raid shelter of Francesc Macià Square (RapM) is one of the four public air-raid shelters built during the Spanish Civil War in the city. It is situated under Francesc Macià Square and very close to the former textile factory Industrial Baurier since factories were military targets. This air-raid shelter had capacity for 80 or 100 people and it was finished building in August 1938 but was not closed in Francoist Spain until March 1939. It was reopened on 11 September 2006 after rehabilitation and it was not turned into a museum until 27 January 2008. Currently, the RapM is divided into five exhibition spaces with an entrance hall, and is designed as a teaching tool to think over the Civil War and the post-war in Sant Adrià.

== Climate ==
Climate data for Sant Adrià de Besòs (data from 1902-1972)
Month	Jan	Feb	Mar	Apr	May	Jun	Jul	Aug	Sep	Oct	Nov	Dec	Year
Mean daily maximum °C (°F)	13.5 (56.3)	14.4 (57.9)	16.7 (62.1)	19.4 (66.9)	22.2 (72.0)	25.2 (77.4)	29.0 (84.2)	28.9 (84.0)	26.9 (80.4)	23.0 (73.4)	17.0 (62.6)	13.8 (56.8)	20.8 (69.4)
Daily mean °C (°F)	8.6 (47.5)	9.2 (48.6)	11.6 (52.9)	14.2 (57.6)	17.1 (62.8)	20.4 (68.7)	23.9 (75.0)	23.9 (75.0)	21.9 (71.4)	17.8 (64.0)	12.3 (54.1)	9.4 (48.9)	15.9 (60.6)
Mean daily minimum °C (°F)	3.7 (38.7)	4.0 (39.2)	6.6 (43.9)	8.9 (48.0)	12.0 (53.6)	15.6 (60.1)	18.8 (65.8)	18.9 (66.0)	16.9 (62.4)	12.5 (54.5)	7.6 (45.7)	5.0 (41.0)	10.9 (51.6)
Source: Sistema de Clasificación Bioclimática Mundial

== Demography ==
Historical population

Year	Pop.	±%
1990	34,729	—
2000	32,452	−6.6%
2001	32,439	−0.0%
2002	32,641	+0.6%
2003	32,845	+0.6%
2004	32,921	+0.2%
2005	32,940	+0.1%

Year	Pop.	±%
2006	32,585	−1.1%
2007	32,734	+0.5%
2008	33,223	+1.5%
2009	33,761	+1.6%
2010	34,104	+1.0%
2011	34,157	+0.2%

Source: Municat. Generalitat de Catalunya.

== Photo gallery ==
Location of the municipality of Sant Adrià de Besòs within the comarca of Barcelonès highlighted in blue.

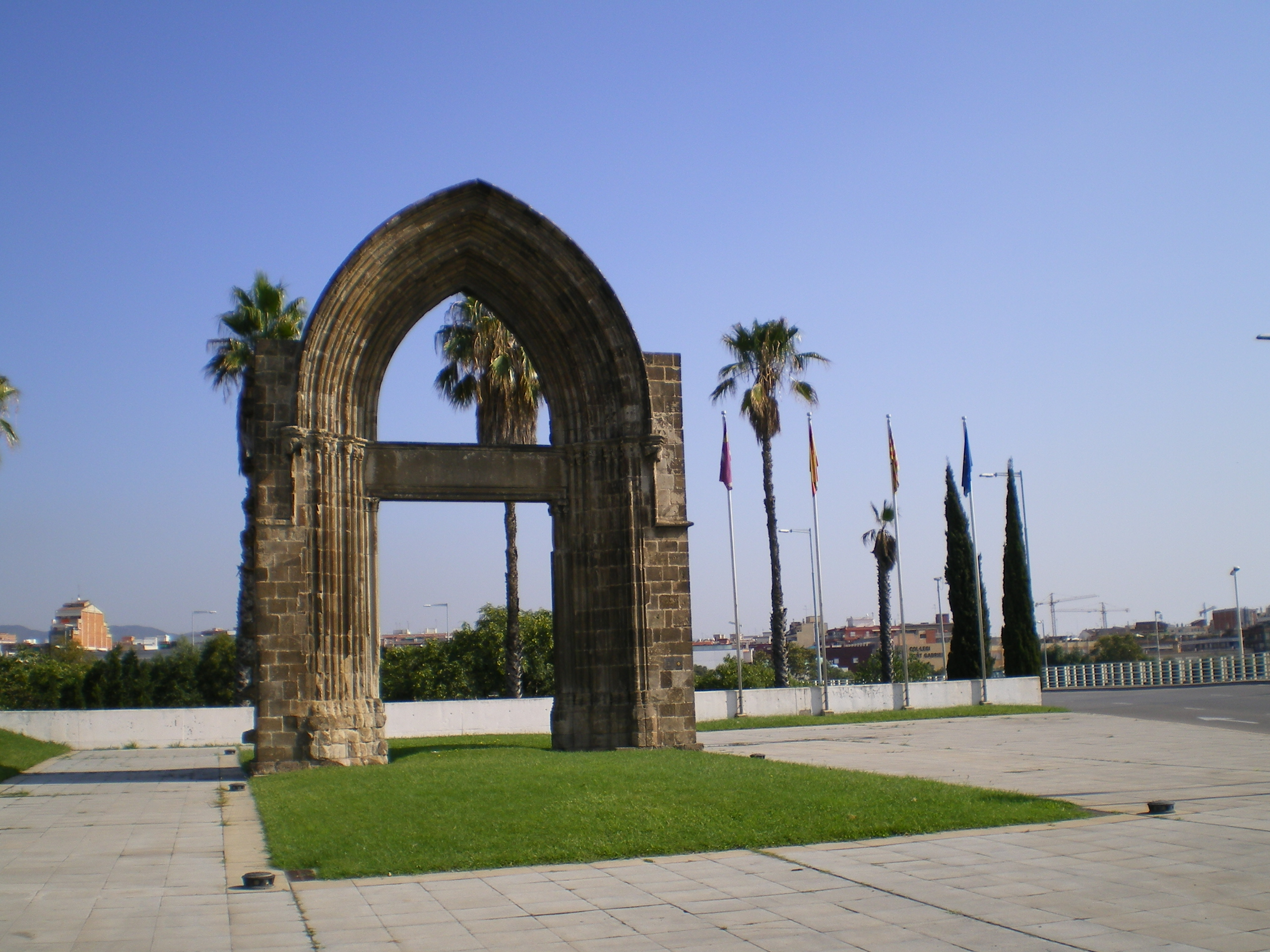
Original portal of the Carmelite Convent of Barcelona dated from the 14th century. Since 1993, it is situated in Sant Adrià as if it was a monument which is locally known as Arc de Sant Adrià.

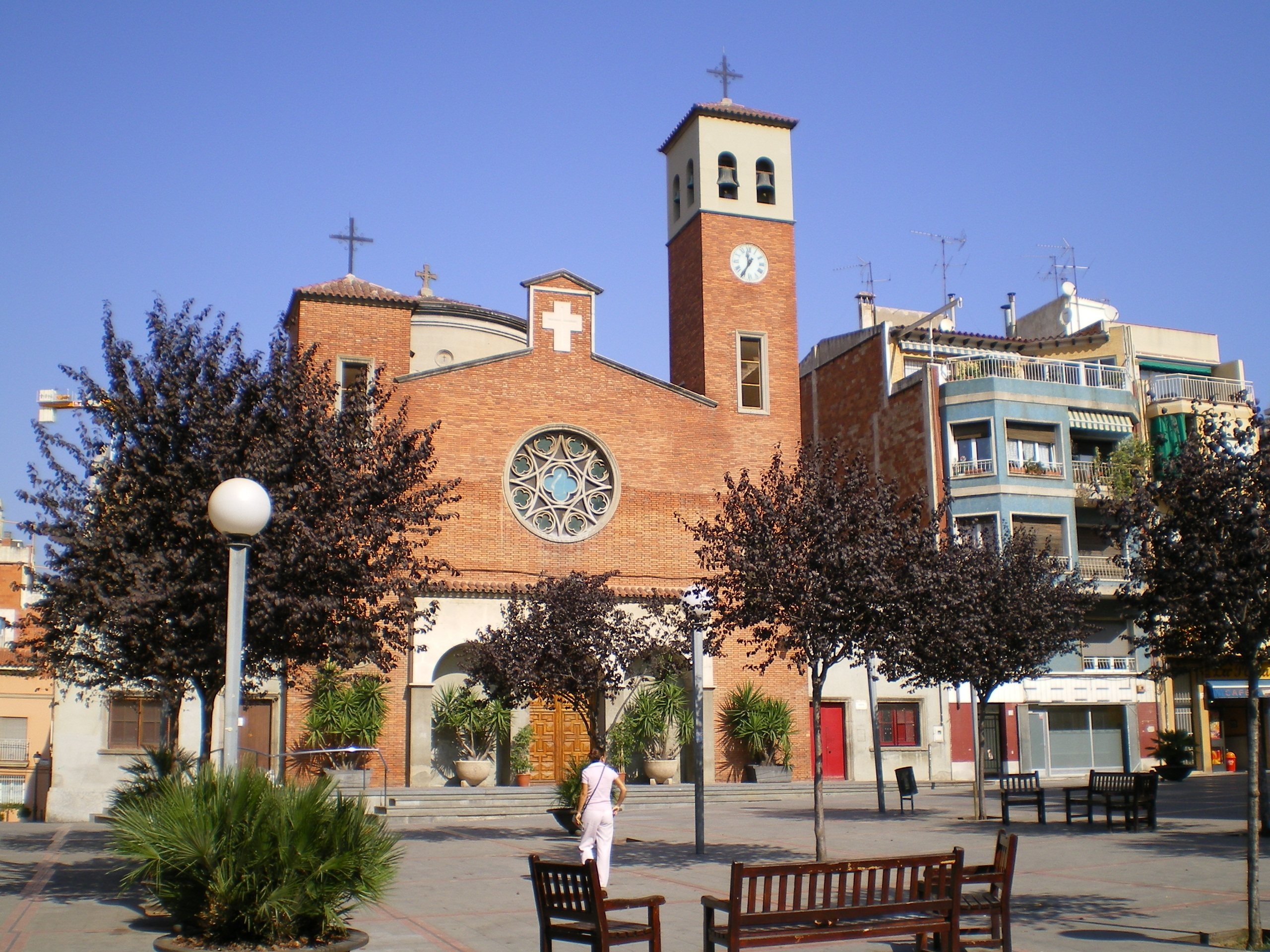
Main façade of the Parish Church of Sant Adrià and the square named after the church where it is situated.

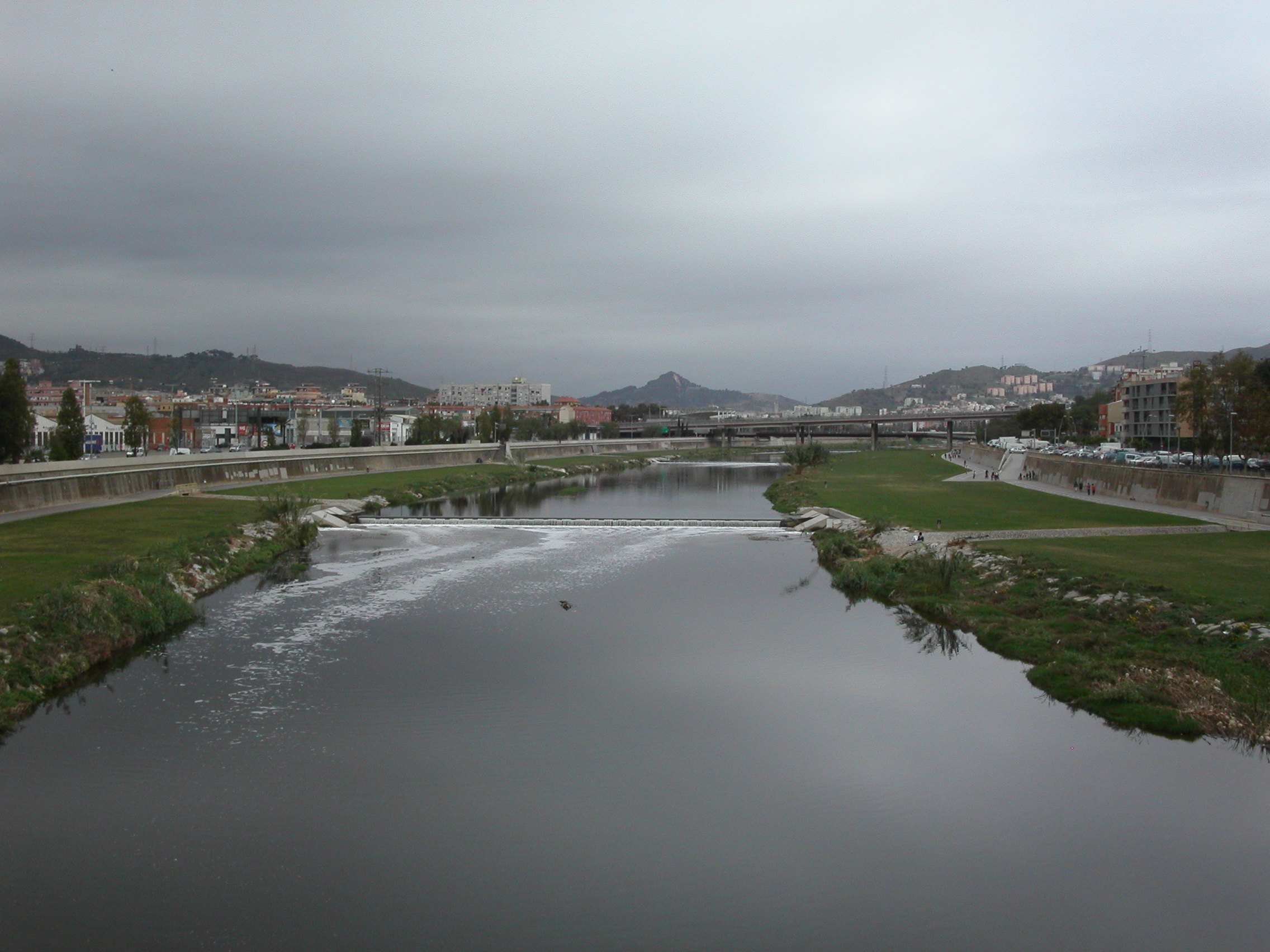
View of the river Besòs as it passes through the municipality. In the later course of the river the "Riverside Park of Besòs" was created and has become an important public open space.

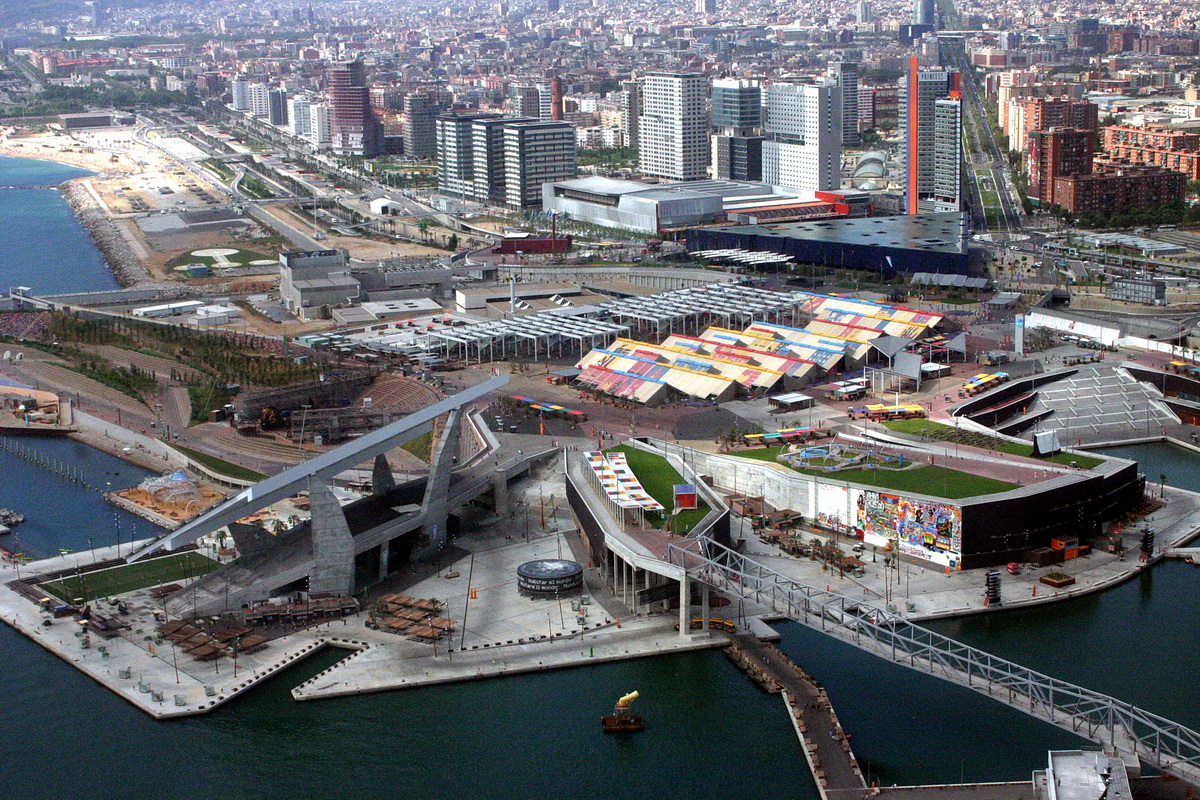
Bird's-eye view of the Fòrum Park. It was built for the 2004 Universal Forum of Cultures and lies between the cities of Barcelona and Sant Adrià.

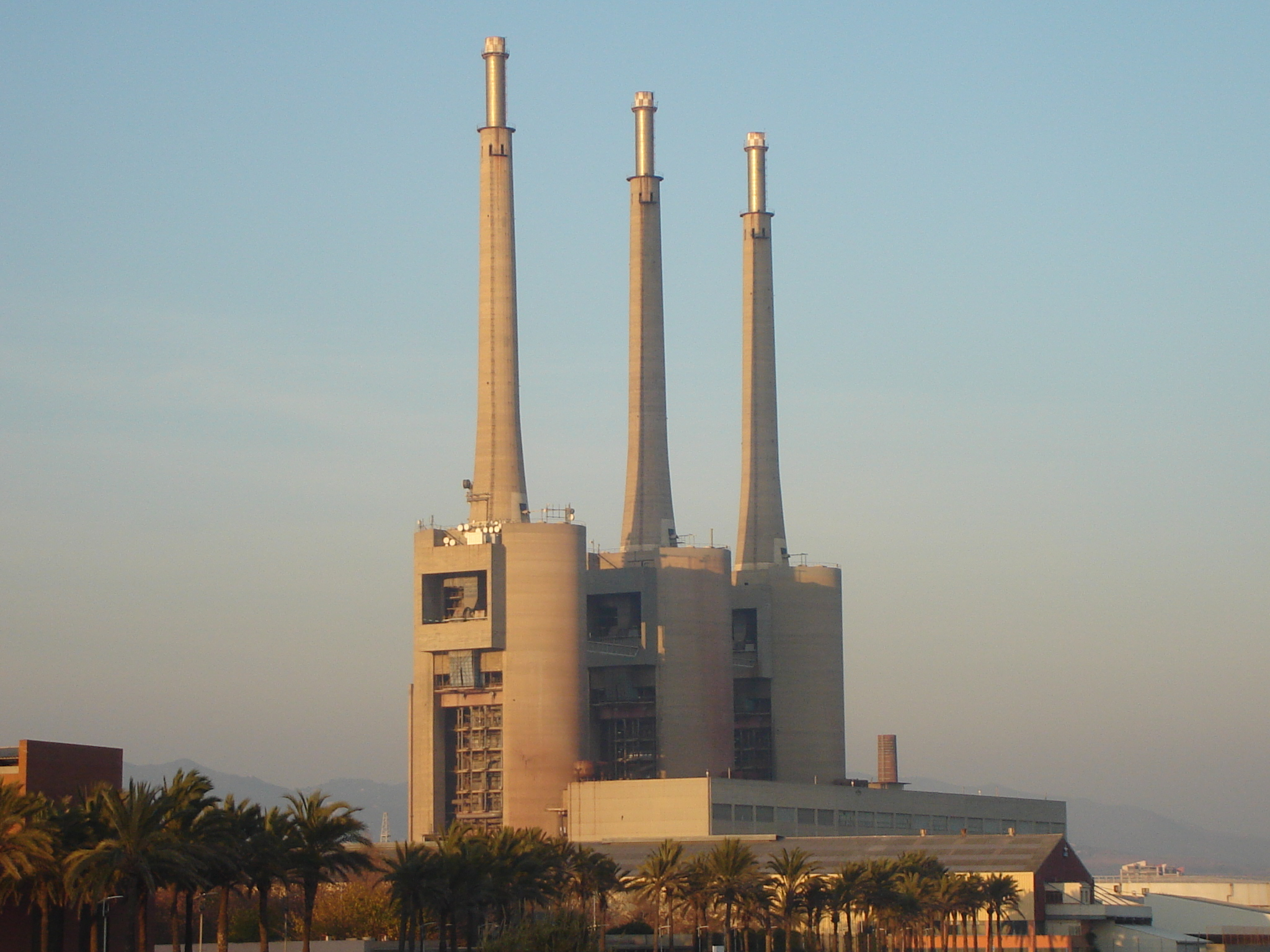
The three chimneys of the now closed Besòs thermal power station have become an icon for the city. In 2008, the citizens of Sant Adrià decided to keep them in a referendum.

== Notable people ==
- Monkey Black (1986–2014) Rapper born in the Dominican Republic. He lived in Sant Adrià de Besòs where he was murdered in 2014.
- Isabel Coixet (1962–), film director, born in Sant Adrià
- Javier Pérez Andújar (1965–), writer, born in Sant Adrià
