= Vallcarca i els Penitents =

Neighborhood in Gràcia, Barcelona, Spain

Coordinates: 41°24′46″N 2°8′35″E

- Neighborhood of Barcelona
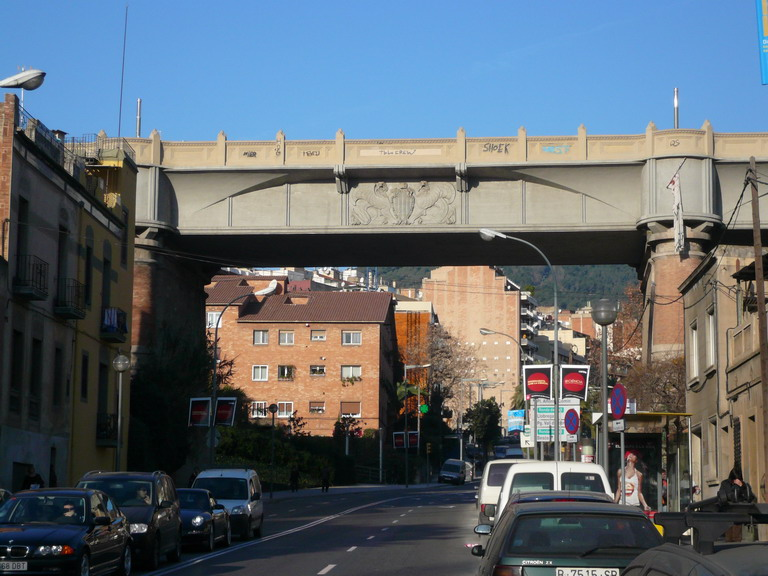
- Viaducte de Vallcarca
- Interactive map of Vallcarca i els Penitents
- Country: Spain
- Autonomous community: Catalonia
- Province: Barcelona
- Comarca: Barcelonès
- Municipality: Barcelona
- District: Gràcia

Area
  - Total: 1.209 km^{2} (0.467 sq mi)

Population
  - Total: 15,448
  - Density: 12,780/km^{2} (33,090/sq mi)

Vallcarca i els Penitents (Catalan pronunciation: [ˌbaʎˈkarkə j əls pəniˈtens]) is a neighbourhood in the northernmost part of Gràcia, a district of Barcelona. Locked between two hills, Putget and El Coll, it grew out of a few scattered settlements, namely L'Hostal de la Farigola, Can Falcó, Can Mas and Can Gomis.

The Parish Church, Virgen de Gracia y San José, popularly known as the “Josepets,” is the location of a Traditional Latin Mass, authorised by bishop Reig Casanova in 2021.

== Transportation ==
Barcelona Metro stations Vallcarca and Penitents, both on L3.

== See also ==
- Urban planning of Barcelona
