= Vall d'Hebron =

Coordinates: 41°25′54″N 2°08′56″E

- Neighborhood of Barcelona
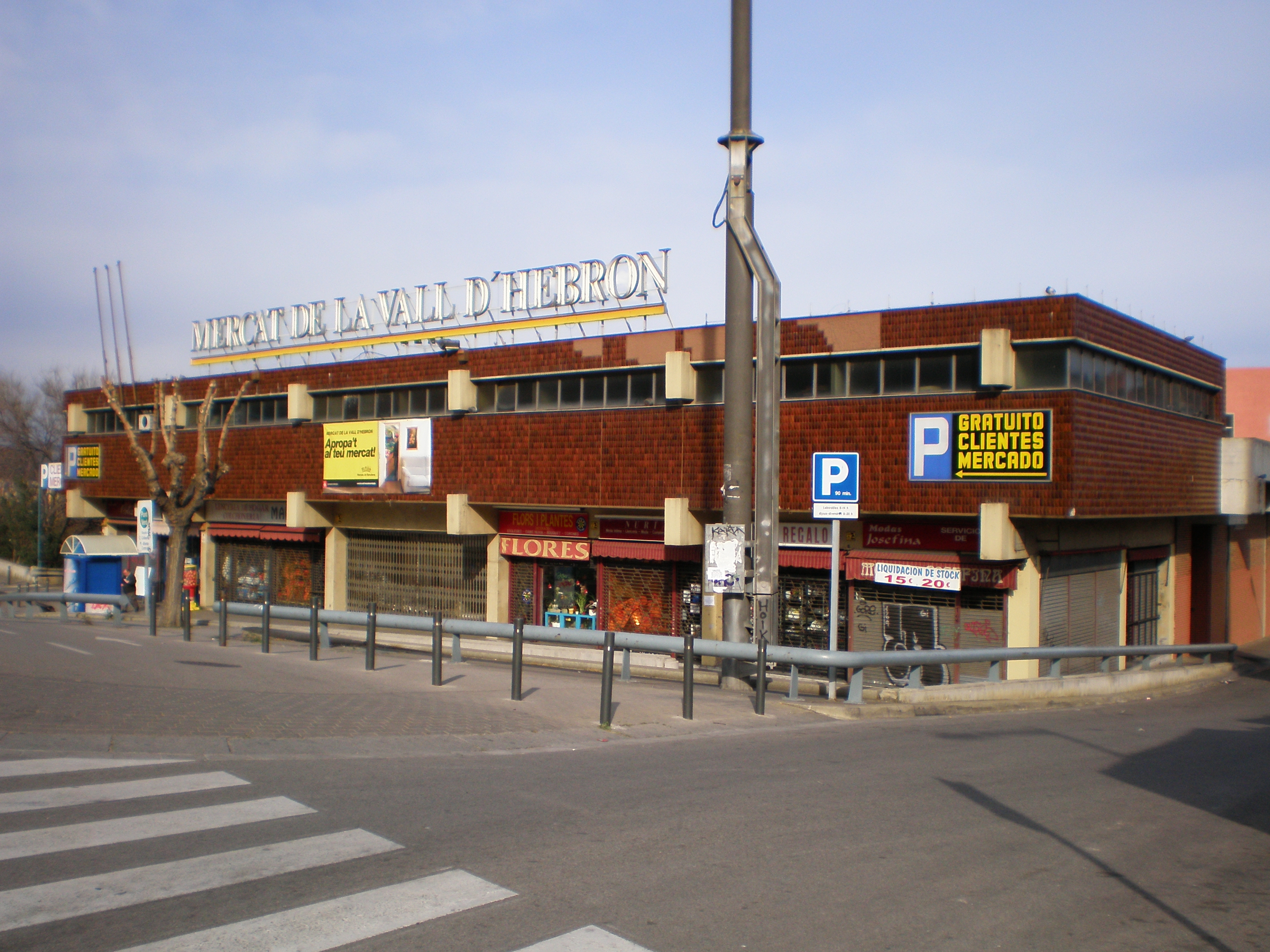
- Market of La Vall d'Hebron
- Interactive map of Vall d'Hebron
- Country: Spain
- Autonomous community: Catalonia
- Province: Barcelona
- Comarca: Barcelonès
- Municipality: Barcelona
- District: Horta-Guinardó

Area
  - Total: 0.736 km^{2} (0.284 sq mi)

Population
  - Total: 5,687
  - Density: 7,730/km^{2} (20,000/sq mi)

Vall d'Hebron (Catalan pronunciation: [lə ˈbaʎ dəˈβɾon], Spanish pronunciation: [la ˈbaʎ deˈβɾon]) is a neighbourhood in the Horta-Guinardó district of Barcelona, Catalonia, Spain.

Four venues in the area hosted competitions for the 1992 Summer Olympics.

The Barcelona Metro line L3 stations of Vall d'Hebron, Montbau and Mundet are all situated on the northern boundary of the neighbourhood, under the Ronda de Dalt. Vall d'Hebron station is also served by line L5.

Despite its name, the Hospital Universitari Vall d'Hebron is not in the neighbourhood of la Vall d'Hebron, but rather in the neighbourhood of Montbau, on the other side of Ronda de Dalt. The hospital is a health campus that brings together four specialties: the university hospital, the research institute, the oncology institute and finally the Multiple Sclerosis Centre of Catalonia.

== See also ==
- Urban planning of Barcelona
