= List of streets and squares in Gràcia, Barcelona =

This is a comprehensive list of streets and squares in Gràcia, a district of Barcelona, Catalonia, Spain.

== A ==
- Abdó Terradas, carrer de
- Adrià Gual, plaça d'
- Agramunt, carrer d'
- Alba, carrer d'
- Albigesos, carrer dels
- Alfonso Comín, plaça d'
- Alió, carrer de
- Alzina, carrer de l'
- Amunt, passeig d'
- Àngel, carrer de l'
- Anna Frank, plaça d'
- Antequera, carrer d'
- Apel·les Fenosa, carrer d'
- Apel·les Mestres, carrer d'
- Argentera, carrer d'
- Ariosto, carrer d'
- Astúries, carrer de
- August Font, carrer d'
- Aulèstia i Pijoan, carrer d'

== B ==
- Badia, carrer de
- Bailèn, carrer de
- Banyoles, carrer de
- Beat Almató, carrer del
- Bellver, carrer de
- Benet Mercadé, carrer de
- Berga, carrer de
- Betània, carrer de
- Betlem, carrer de
- Bolívar, carrer de
- Bonavista, carrer de
- Bretón de los Herreros, carrer de
- Bruniquer, carrer de

== C ==
- Ca l'Alegre, carrer de
- Camèlies, carrer de les
- Camil Oliveras, passatge de
- Camprodon, carrer de
- Canó, carrer del
- Capellades, carrer de
- Cardener, carrer de
- Carmel, carretera del
- Carolines, carrer de les
- Castellterçol, carrer de
- Caterina Albert, jardins de
- Cesare Cantú, carrer de
- Cigne, carrer del
- Ciudad Real, carrer de
- Clavell, carrer del
- Coll del Portell, avinguda del
- Congost, carrer del
- Còrsega, carrer de
- Creueta del Coll, parc de la

== D ==
- Dalt, ronda de
- Dalt, travessera de
- Diamant, plaça del
- Doctor Rizal, carrer del
- Dolors Lleonart, carrer de
- Domènech, carrer de
- Duran i Borrell, carrer de

== E ==
- Encarnació, carrer de l'
- Enric Clarasó, carrer d'
- Escorial, carrer de l'
- Església, carrer de l'
- Esparreguera, carrer d'
- Esteve Terradas, carrer de

== F ==
- Ferrer de Blanes, carrer de
- Font del Remei, carrer de la
- Francesc Tarrafa, carrer de
- Francisco Giner, carrer de
- Fraternitat, carrer de la
- Frigola, passatge

== G ==
- Goldoni, carrer de
- Gòlgota, carrer del
- Goya, carrer de
- Gràcia, carrer de
- Gràcia, travessera de
- Gran de Gràcia, carrer
- Granja, carrer de la
- Grassot, carrer d'en
- Grau Miró, plaça de
- Güell, Parc
- Guillem Abiell, passatge de
- Guilleries, carrer de
- Guinardó, ronda del
- Gutenberg, carrer de

== H ==
- Haití, carrer d'
- Hipòlit Lázaro, carrer d'

== I ==
- Igualada, carrer d'
- Indústria, carrer de la

== J ==
- Jaén, carrer de
- Jaume Cabrera, carrer de
- Jesús, carrer de
- Joanic, plaça de
- Joaquim Ruyra, carrer de
- John Lennon, plaça de
- Josep Maria Jujol, carrer de
- Josep Jover, carrer de

== L ==
- Laguna Lanao, carrer de
- La Plata, carrer de
- Larrard, carrer de
- Lavallol, passatge de
- Legalitat, carrer de la
- Leopoldo Alas, carrer de
- Lesseps, plaça de
- Llibertat, carrer de la
- Llibertat, plaça de la
- Lliri, carrer del
- Llorer, carrer del
- Lluís Bonifaç, carrer de
- Lluís Vives, carrer de

== M ==
- Maduixer, carrer del
- Maignon, carrer de
- Manlleu, carrer de
- Manlleu, passatge de
- Manuel Torrente, carrer de
- Mare de Déu dels Desemparats, carrer de la
- Mare de Déu de Montserrat, avinguda de la
- Mare de Déu de la Salut, carrer de la
- Maria, carrer de
- Mariana, carrer de
- Mariana Pineda, carrer de
- Martí, carrer de
- Maspons, carrer de
- Mateu, carrer de
- Matilde, carrer de
- Maurici Serrahima, carrer de
- Mediona, carrer de
- Mercedes, carrer de
- Mercedes, passatge de
- Mercedes, rambla de
- Mestre Balcells, jardins del
- Mig, Ronda del
- Milà i Fontanals, carrer de
- Milà i Fontanals, plaça de
- Milton, carrer de
- Minerva, carrer de
- Ministral, passatge
- Molist, carrer de
- Monistrol, carrer de
- Montserrat, placeta de
- Montmany, carrer de
- Montornès, carrer de
- Móra d'Ebre, carrer de
- Móra la Nova, carrer de
- Mossèn Masdedexart, carrer de
- Mozart, carrer de

== N ==
- Napoleó, passatge de
- Nàpols, carrer de
- Narcís Oller, plaça de
- Navata, carrer de
- Nicolás Salmerón, plaça de
- Nil Fabra, carrer de
- Nogués, carrer de
- Nord, plaça del

== O ==
- Olèrdola, plaça d'
- Otília Castellvi, carrer d'

== P ==
- Palma de Sant Genís, carrer de
- Palou, carrer de
- Pas de l'Àngel
- Pare Jacint Alegre, carrer del
- Pare Laínez, carrer del
- Carrer del Penedès
- Penitents, carrer de
- Pere Llobet, carrer de
- Pere Serafí, carrer de
- Pérez Galdós, carrer de
- Perill, carrer del
- Perla, carrer de la
- Pi i Margall, carrer de
- Poble Romaní, plaça del
- Pompeu Fabra, avinguda de
- Portell, carrer del
- Prat, rambla de
- Profeta, carrer del
- Progrès, carrer del
- Providència, carrer de la
- Puigmartí, carrer de

== Q ==
- Quevedo, carrer de

== R ==
- Rabassa, carrer de
- Ramis, carrer de
- Ramón i Cajal, carrer de
- Raspall, plaça de
- Reig i Bonet, carrer de
- Revolució de Setembre de 1808, plaça de la
- Riera de can Toda, carrer de
- Riera de Sant Miquel, carrer de la
- Riera de Vallcarca, carrer de
- Rius i Taulet, plaça de
- Robí, carrer del
- Roger de Flor, carrer de
- Romans, carrer de
- Ròmul Bosch, passatge de
- Ros, carrer de
- Ros de Olano, carrer de
- Rosella, carrer de la
- Rovira i Trias, plaça de
- Rubens, carrer de

== S ==
- Sagrada Família, passatge de las
- Salines, carrer de les
- Salvador Alarma, carrer de
- Salvador Espriu, jardins de
- Samsó, carrer de
- Sanllehy, plaça
- Santa Àgata, carrer de
- Santa Clotilde, carrer de
- Santa Creu, carrer de la
- Santa Elionor, carrer de
- Santa Eugènia, carrer de
- Santa Magdalena, carrer de
- Santa Rosa, carrer de
- Santa Tecla, carrer de
- Santa Teresa, carrer de
- Sant Agustí, carrer de
- Sant Antoni, travessera de
- Sant Antoni Maria Claret, carrer de
- Sant Cristòfol, carrer de
- Sant Cugat, carrer de
- Sant Domènec, carrer de
- Sant Joan, passeig de
- Sant Josep Cottolengo, carrer de
- Sant Josep de la Muntanya, passatge de
- Sant Lluc, plaça de
- Sant Lluís, carrer de
- Sant Marià, baixada de
- Sant Onofre, carrer de
- Sant Pere Màrtir, carrer de
- Sant Salvador, carrer de
- Secretari Coloma, carrer del
- Sedeta, jardins de la
- Sèneca, carrer de
- Sicília, carrer de
- Siracusa, carrer de
- Sol, plaça del
- Solanell, baixada de
- Sors, carrer de

== T ==
- Tagamanent, carrer de
- Terol, carrer de
- Terrassa, carrer de
- Ticià, carrer de
- Tirso, carrer de
- Tona, plaça de
- Topazi, carrer del
- Tordera, carrer de
- Torrent de les Flors, carrer del
- Torrent de Mariner, carrer del
- Torrent de l'Olla, carrer del
- Torrent d'en Vidalet, carrer del
- Torrijos, carrer de
- Les Tres Senyores, carrer de
- Trilla, carrer de
- Trilla, plaça de

== U ==
- Uruguai, carrer d'

== V ==
- Vallcarca, avinguda de
- Vallcarca, viaducte de
- Vall d'Hebron, passeig de la
- Valldoreix, carrer de
- Vallès, carrer del
- Vallfogona, carrer de
- Vallpar, carrer de
- Veciana, carrer de
- Velázquez, carrer de
- Ventalió, carrer de
- Venus, carrer de
- Verdi, carrer de
- Verntallat, carrer de
- Viada, carrer de
- Vilafranca, carrer de
- Virreina, plaça de la

== X ==
- Xiquets de Valls, carrer dels
