= Valldaura station =

Metro station in Barcelona, Spain

Valldaura
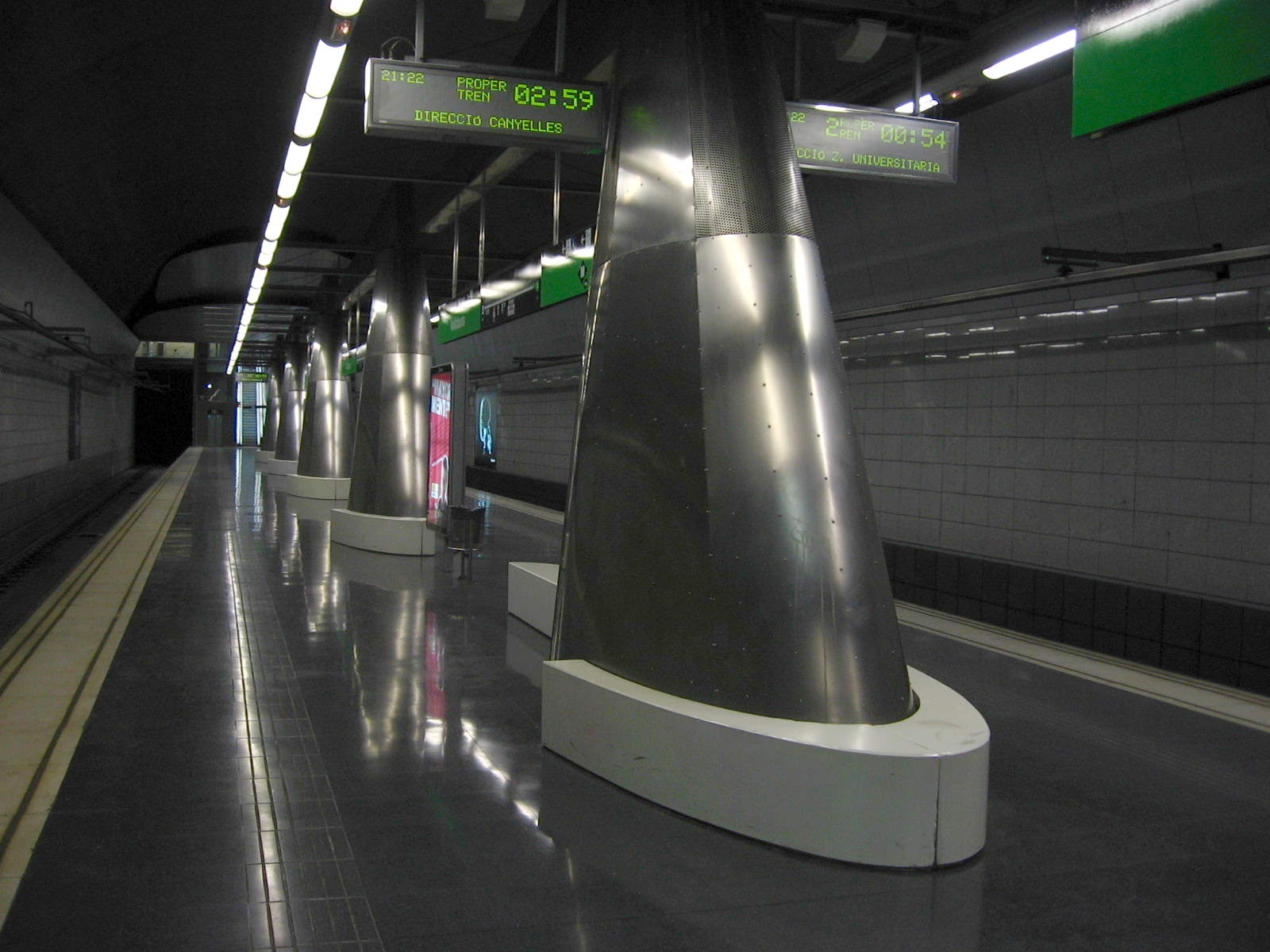

General information
- Location: Barcelona (Horta-Guinardó)
- Coordinates: 41°26′17″N 2°9′24″E
- System: Barcelona Metro rapid transit station
- Owner: Transports Metropolitans de Barcelona
- Platforms: 1 island platform
- Tracks: 2

Construction
- Structure type: Underground

Other information
- Fare zone: 1 (ATM)

History
- Opened: 2001

Services
Preceding station	Metro	Following station
Mundet towards Zona Universitària	L3	Canyelles towards Trinitat Nova
Location
- Location within Barcelona Location within Spain

Valldaura (Catalan pronunciation: [ˌbaʎˈdawɾə]) is a Barcelona Metro station, in the Horta-Guinardó district of Barcelona. The station is served by line L3.

The station is located underneath the Passeig de Valldaura, between Carrer Canigó and Carrer Hedilla in the north-east of the city. The island-platform station has a single access at Carrer Canigó. The station is wheelchair-accessible via elevators.

The station was opened in 2001, when the section of line L3 from Montbau station to Canyelles station was inaugurated. It was designed by Manel Sánchez.
