= Montbau =

Coordinates: 41°25′51.33″N 2°8′34.68″E

- Neighborhood of Barcelona
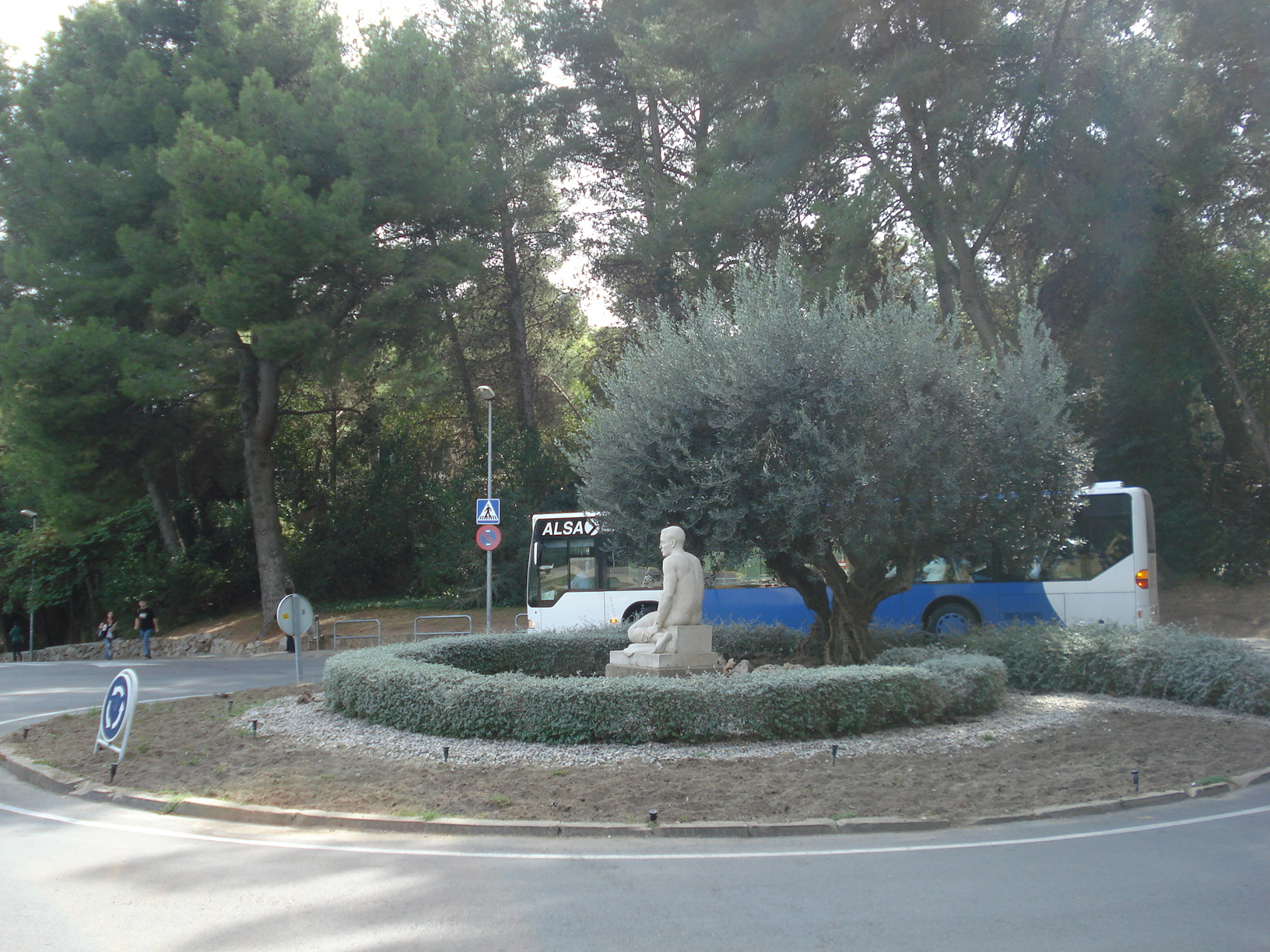
- Mundet campus, Universitat de Barcelona
- Country: Spain
- Autonomous community: Catalonia
- Province: Barcelona
- Comarca: Barcelonès
- Municipality: Barcelona
- District: Horta-Guinardó

Area
  - Total: 2.047 km^{2} (0.790 sq mi)

Population
  - Total: 5,101
  - Density: 2,492/km^{2} (6,454/sq mi)
- Demonym(s): montbauenc, -a

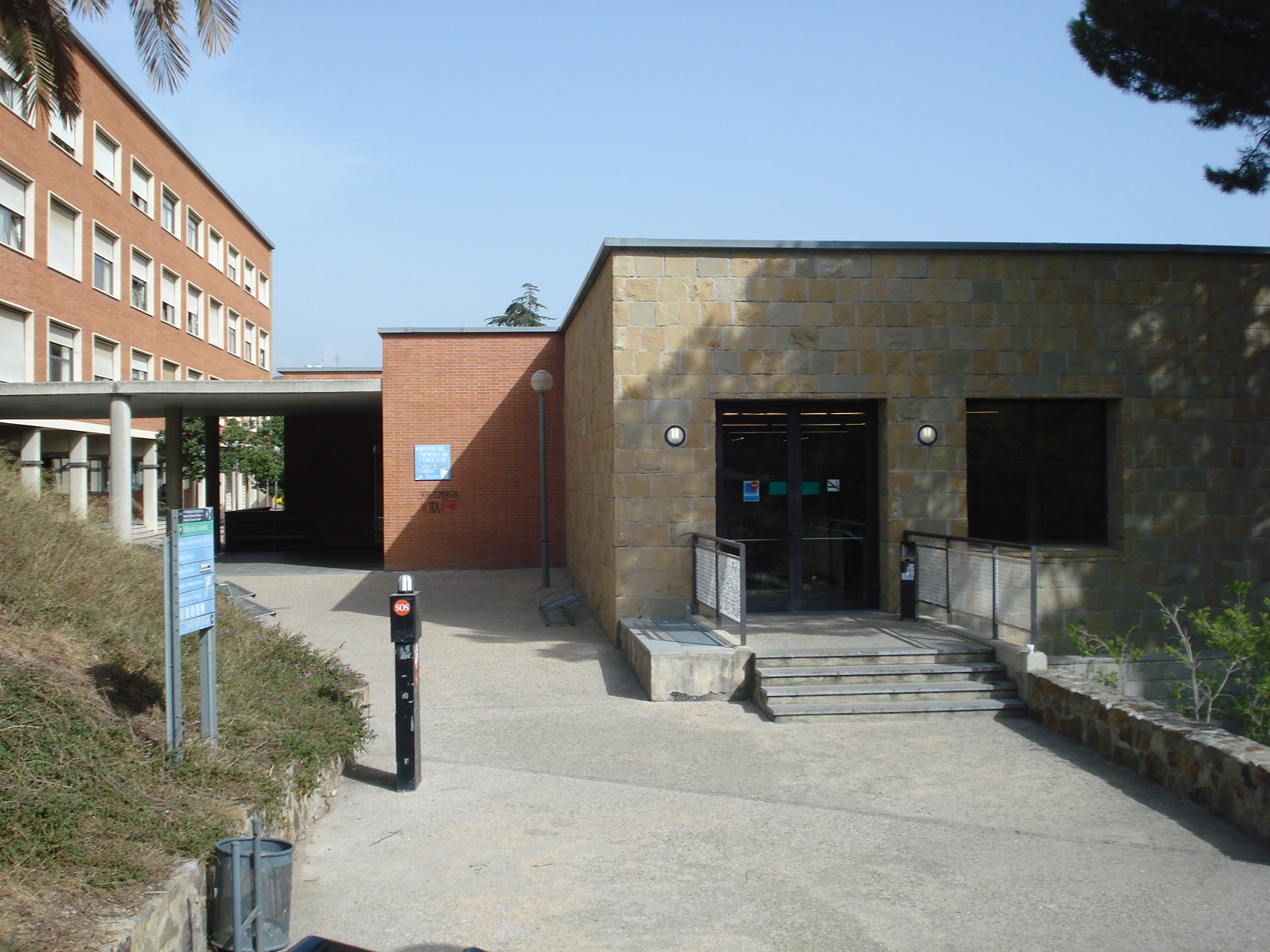
Edifici de Migdia: Pedagogia and Formació del Professorat degree buildings (UB)

Montbau (Catalan pronunciation: [ˌmomˈbaw]) is a neighborhood in the Horta-Guinardó district of the city of Barcelona, Catalonia, Spain.

In the eastern part of the neighborhood there is the campus Mundet, which had been the old Llars Mundet that was a charitable organization. In the campus there is the School of Psychology and pedagogy of the University of Barcelona, a geriatric home and schools. In the western part there is the Hospital Universitari Vall d'Hebron.

The Barcelona Metro line L3 stations of Vall d'Hebron, Montbau and Mundet are all situated on the southern boundary of the neighbourhood, under the Ronda de Dalt. Vall d'Hebron station is also served by line L5.
