= Fontana station =

Fontana station may refer to:

- Fontana metro station, a rapid transit station in Barcelona, Catalonia, Spain
- Fontana station (California), a commuter rail station in Fontana, California, USA
