= Liceu station =

Metro station in Barcelona, Spain

Liceu
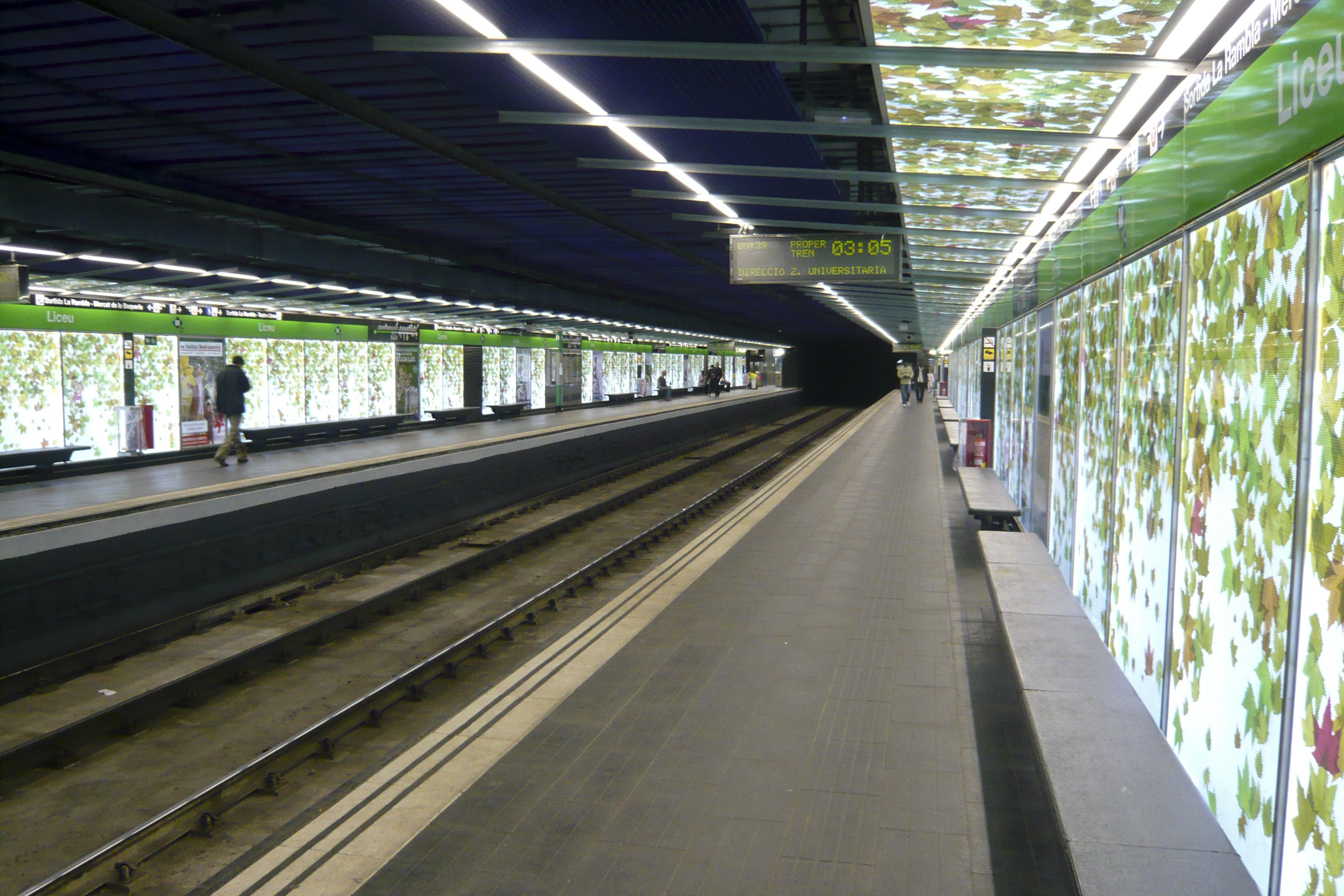
- View of the platforms in 2008

General information
- Location: La Rambla, s/n 08002 Barcelona
- Coordinates: 41°22′52.81″N 2°10′23.91″E
- System: Barcelona Metro rapid transit station
- Owner: Transports Metropolitans de Barcelona
- Platforms: 2 side platforms
- Tracks: 2

Construction
- Structure type: Underground
- Accessible: yes

Other information
- Fare zone: 1 (ATM)

History
- Opened: 5 July 1925

Services
Preceding station	Metro	Following station
Drassanes towards Zona Universitària	L3	Catalunya towards Trinitat Nova
Location
- Location within Barcelona Location within Spain

Liceu (Catalan pronunciation: [liˈsɛw]) is a Barcelona Metro station situated under the La Rambla between Gran Teatre del Liceu and Mercat de la Boqueria in the Barri Gòtic, part of Barcelona's district of Ciutat Vella. It is served by TMB-operated Barcelona Metro line L3.

The station consists of a single level, on which there are two tracks served by two side platforms. The station has two pairs of street entrances, with one pair at the Teatre del Liceu end of the station and the other at the Mercat end. Each entrance in a pair leads only to one of the two platforms, and there is no connection between the two platforms without exiting the station and returning to street level.

The station was opened on 15 July 1925 as the southern terminus of the Gran Metropolitano de Barcelona from Lesseps station. At first it just had entrances at the Teatre del Liceu end of the station, but in the 1960s new accesses were added at the other end of the station. In 1946, the line was extended a short distance south to Fernando station, which closed when the line was further extended to Drassanes station in 1968. The station was completely rebuilt between 2007 and 2008 to make it more accessible.

Liceu is the first station of Barcelona Metro network with a themed decoration. The walls are illuminated and decorated with pictures of leaves of the London plane trees that can be found on La Rambla. There is also a ceramic mural made by the Escola Massana in the station's southern vestibule.

In 2024, it was the thirteenth most used station of the Barcelona Metro network, with 7.6 million users, and the most used station which did not have an interchange with another line.

== Gallery ==
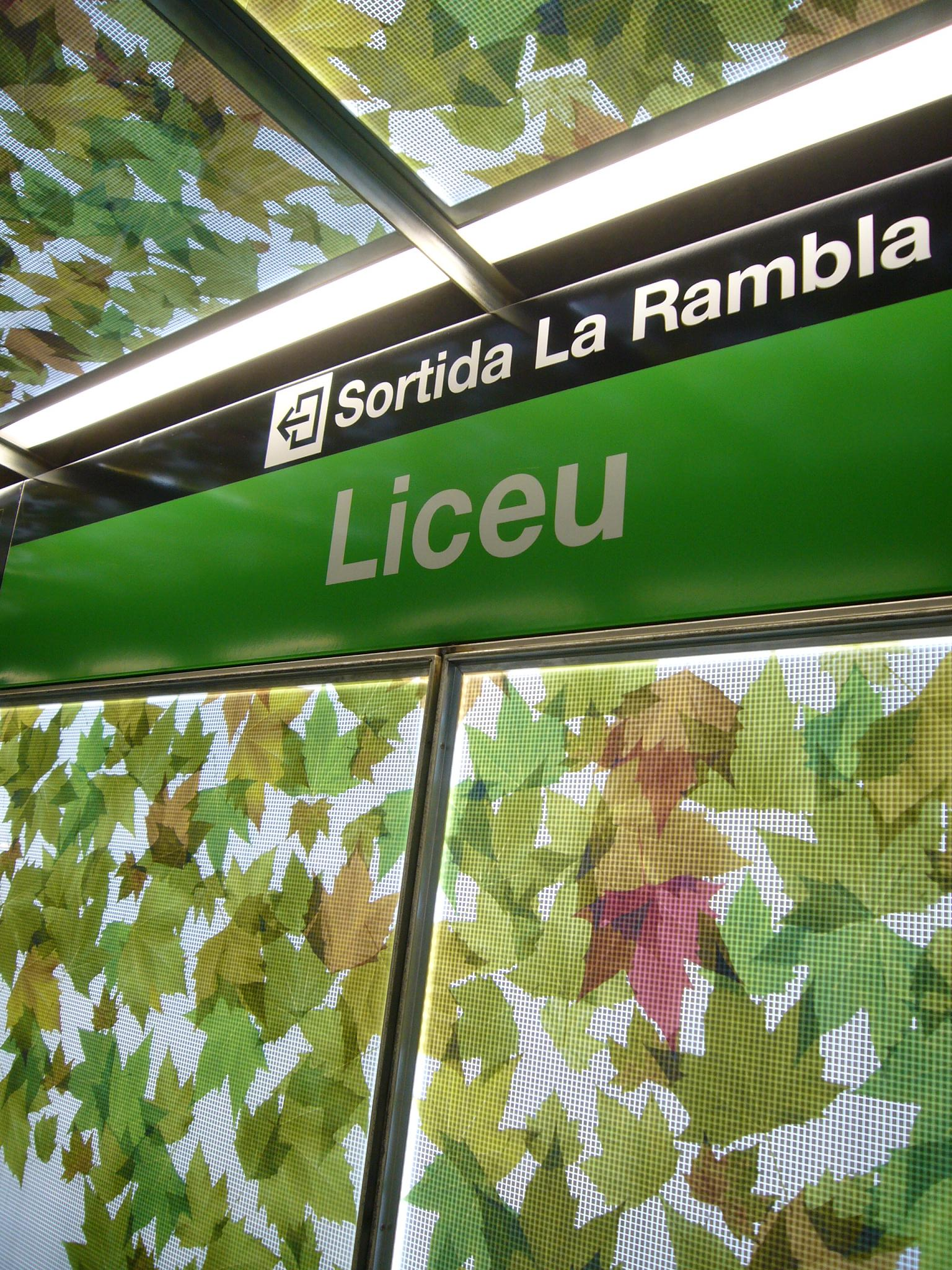
Closeup of the platform decoration

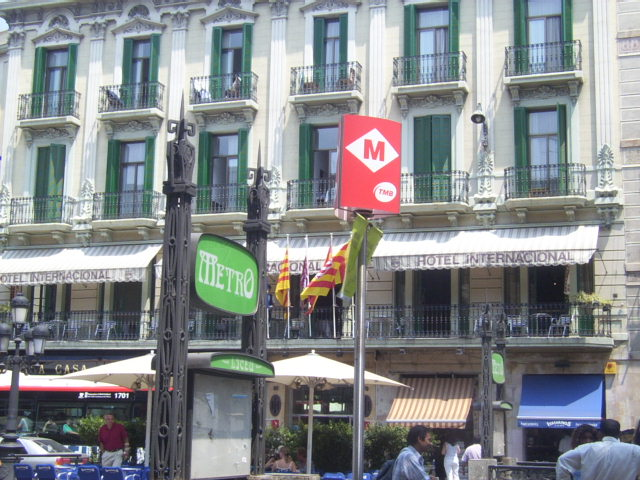
Entrance to the station with the imitation of the former "modernist" sign

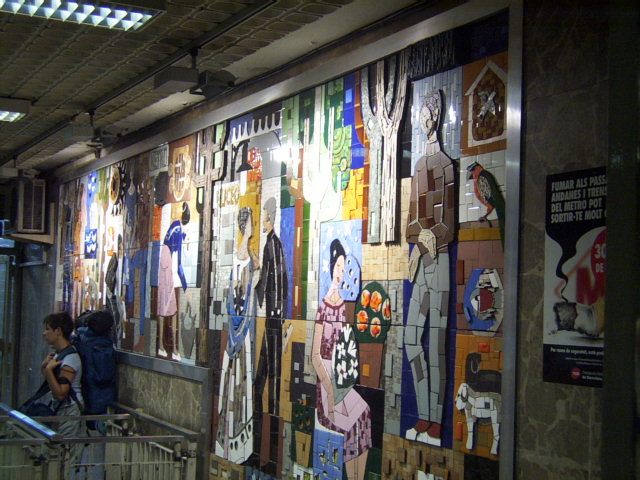
Ceramic mural in the southern vestibule
