= Fernando station =

Former Barcelona metro station

Fernando

General information
- Location: La Rambla, Ciutat Vella, Barcelona
- Coordinates: 41°22′49.1″N 2°10′26.5″E
- System: Barcelona Metro rapid transit station
- Owner: Transports Metropolitans de Barcelona
- Platforms: 1 side platform
- Tracks: 2

Construction
- Structure type: Underground

History
- Opened: 1946
- Closed: 1968
Location
- Location within Barcelona Location within Spain

Fernando, also called Ferran, is a former Barcelona metro station. The station site is located on line L3 between the existing stations of Liceu and Drassanes, and under the Rambla boulevard.

The station opened in 1946 as the terminus of a short extension of L3 from Liceu station. It had a single track and 61-metre (200 ft) long platform, and was accessed by an entrance at the junction of La Rambla and Carrer de Ferran. The station was closed in 1968 to permit the extension of the line to Drassanes station.

== See also ==
- Disused Barcelona Metro stations
