= Drassanes =

Drassanes may refer to:

- the Drassanes Reials de Barcelona, a former royal shipyard and current maritime museum in the city of Barcelona, Catalonia, Spain
- the Drassanes metro station, in the city of Barcelona, Catalonia, Spain
