= Plaça de Lesseps, Barcelona =

Square in Barcelona, Spain

Coordinates: 41°24′25″N 2°08′59″E

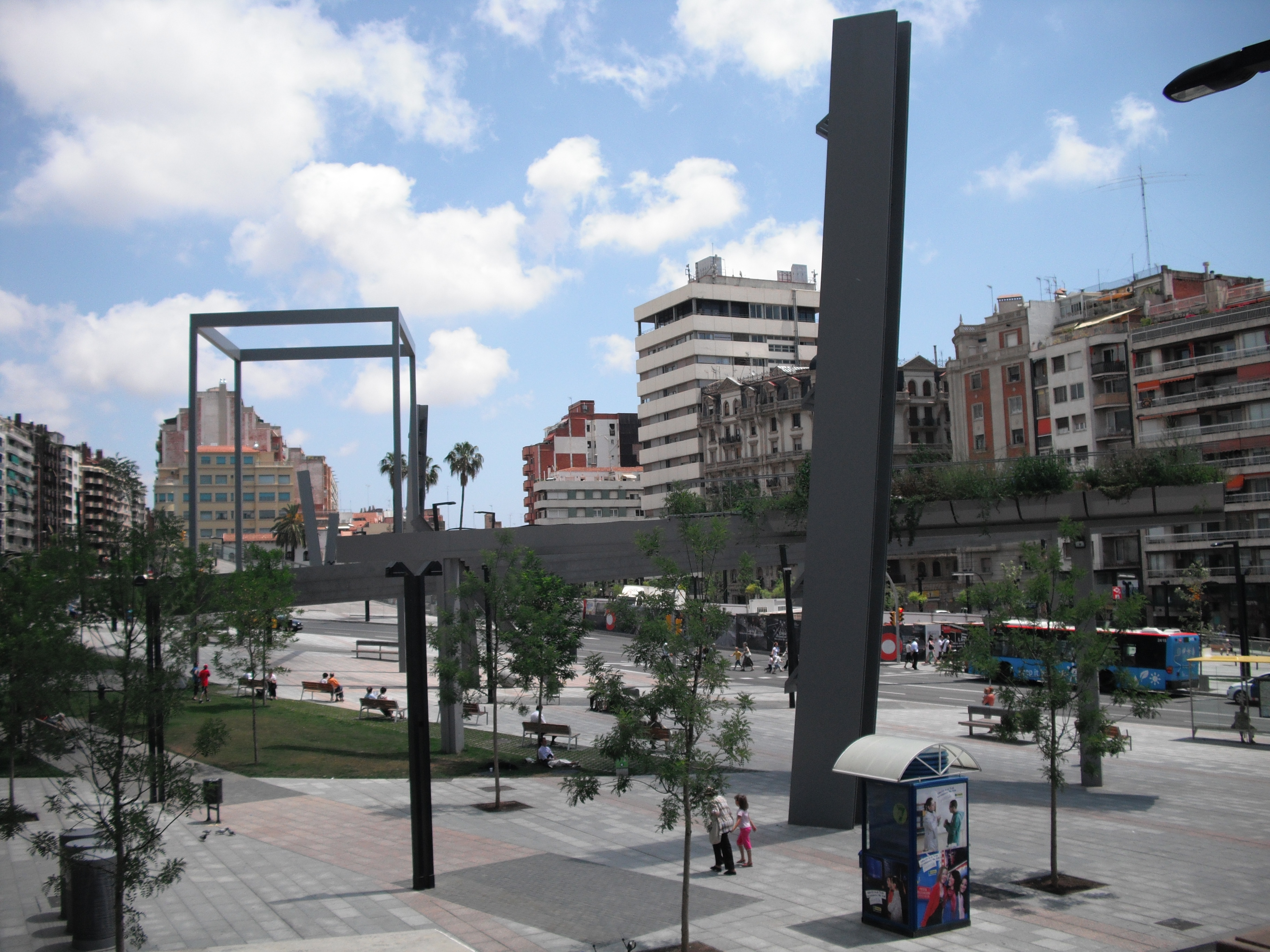
Plaça de Lesseps in 2009, as seen from els Josepets.

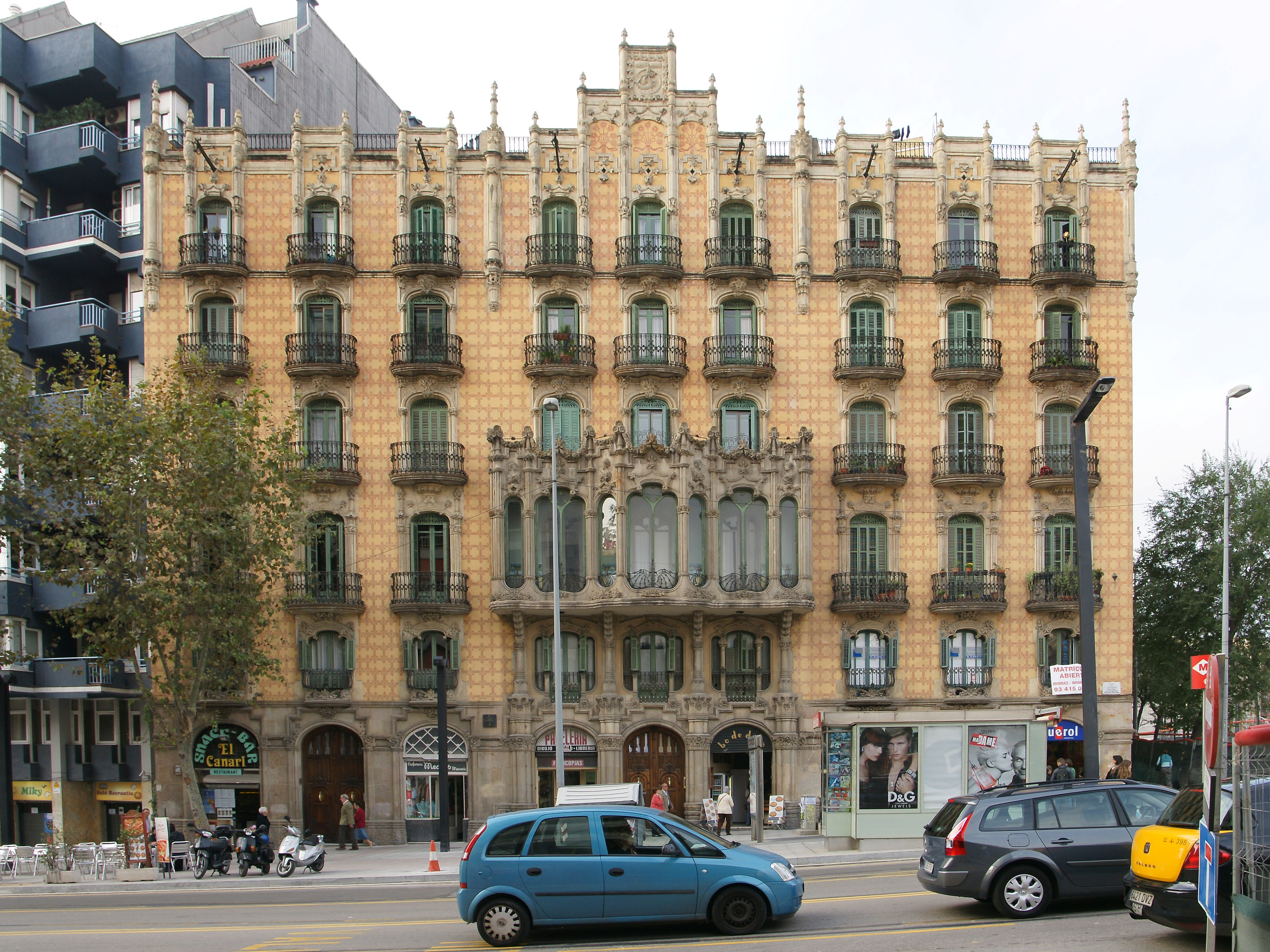
Cases Ramos on Plaça de Lesseps.

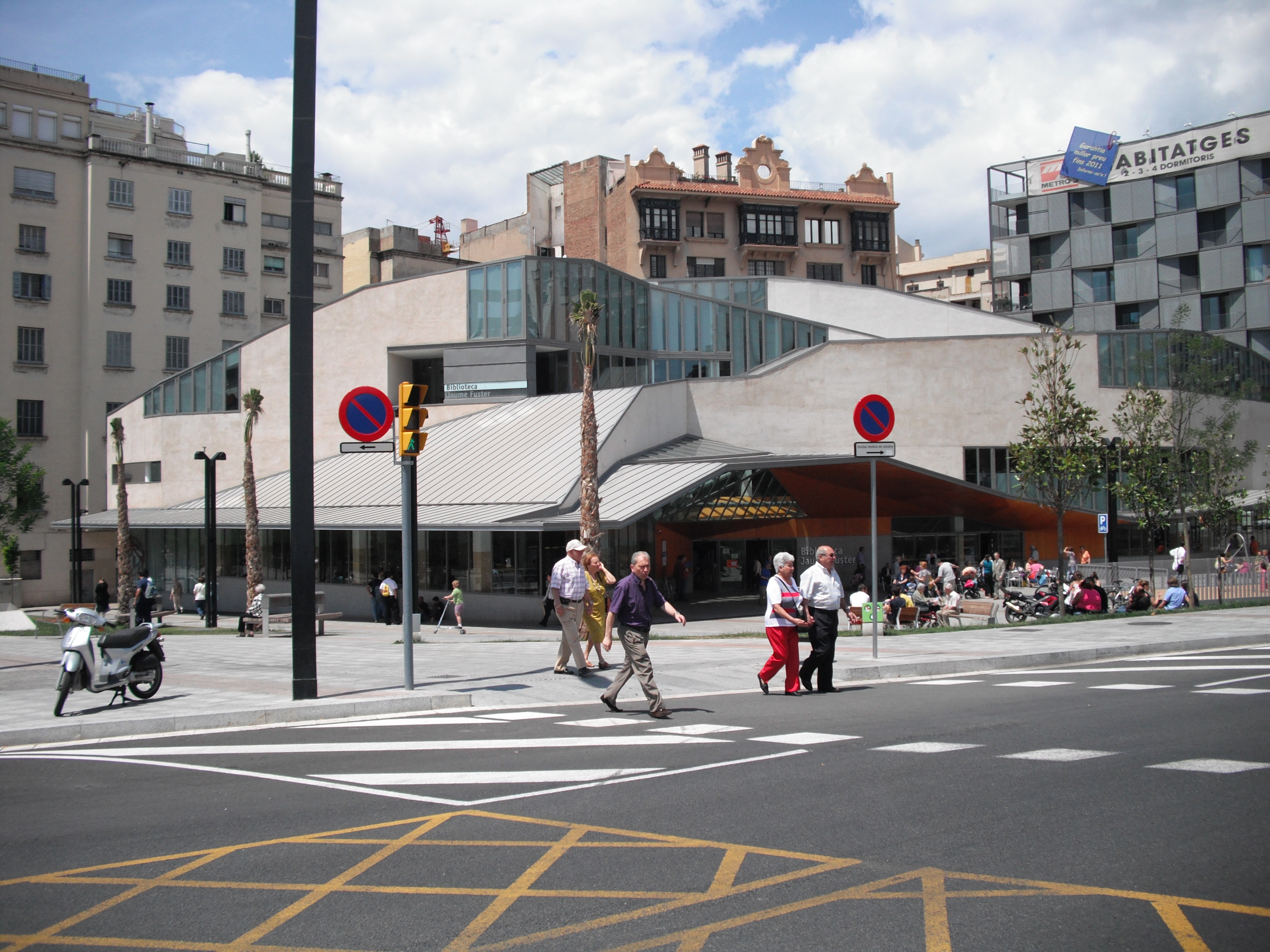
Biblioteca Jaume Fuster.

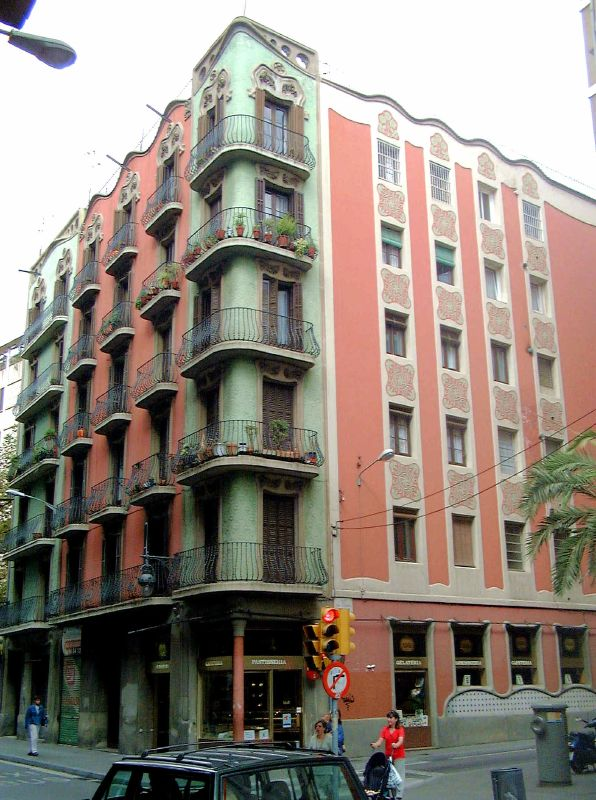
Cases Antonio Par

Plaça de Lesseps (Catalan pronunciation: [ˈplasə ðə ləˈseps]) is a square serving as the border between the Sarrià-Sant Gervasi and Gràcia district of Barcelona, Catalonia, Spain, loosely divided in two parts. One of the most heavily transited squares in the city, Lesseps is the starting point of one of Barcelona's busiest rondes: Ronda del General Mitre, as well as being the west end of Carrer Gran de Gràcia and being crossed by a number of streets, namely: Travessera de Dalt, Avinguda del Príncep d'Astúries, Avinguda de Vallcarca, Avinguda de la República Argentina, Carrer del Torrent de l'Olla, Carrer de la Mare de Déu del Coll, Carrer de Santa Perpètua, Carrer de Maignon and Carrer de Pérez Galdós.

A traditionally arbored spot of the city, it has seen heavy construction works for years to move the route of the aforementioned rondes, allowing the square to become a more pedestrian-friendly place while easing the heavy traffic that crosses it on a daily basis.

One of the most notable buildings in the square is Casa Ramos (or Casas Ramos, as there are three), designed by Jaume Torres i Grau (1906–1908). Its façade features striking sgraffito decorations in yellow and orange, giving the building a distinctive appearance. Together with its modernist design—especially the prominent main bay window—this makes it one of the most emblematic buildings in the district of Gràcia.

Another notable modernist building, located on one corner of the square, is the Cases Antoni Par (1903–1906), designed by Jeroni Ferran Granell i Manresa. The undulating crowning, the vegetal sgraffito decoration, the combination of red and green colors, and the sculptural framing of the balconies are all characteristic features of this architect’s work.

The square is named after Ferdinand de Lesseps, the developer of the Suez Canal. Earlier in his career, De Lesseps was the French consul in Barcelona. He is known in Barcelona for having intervened against the 1842 bombing of the city ordered by General Baldomero Espartero and Captain-General Juan Van Halen. Before 1895 the square had been known as Josepets, after the 1626 convent of Santa Maria de Gràcia, also known as Els Josepets", which remained a popular name for the square, although now outdated.

== Culture ==
- Jaume Fuster library, inaugurated in 2006.

== Education ==
=== Schools ===
- Col·legi d'Educació Infantil i Primària Rius i Taulet
- Aula de Formació d'Adults Rius i Taulet

=== Other ===
- Residència Universitària Lesseps

== Religion ==
- Parròquia de la Verge de Gràcia i Sant Josep, a Catholic church.

== Transport ==
=== Metro ===
- Lesseps metro station, one of the city's oldest metro stations, served by L3. It's expected to be served by L9 in the future.

=== Bus ===
The following bus routes reach Plaça de Lesseps:

- Line 22 Pl. Catalunya - Ctra. Esplugues
- Line 24 Av. Paral·lel - Carmel
- Line 28 Pl. Catalunya - Carmel
- Line 31 Hospital Clínic - Canyelles
- Line 32 Estació de Sants - Roquetes
- Line 74 Zona Universitària - Fabra i Puig
- Line 87 Pg. Maragall - Travessera de Gràcia
- Line 92 Pg. Marítim - Gràcia
- Line 116 Gràcia - La Salut
- Tibibus

=== Night bus ===
- Line N4 Via Favència - Pl. Catalunya - Gran Vista

== See also ==
- Gràcia
- List of streets and squares in Gràcia
- Urban planning of Barcelona
