= El Putxet station =

Metro station in Barcelona, Spain

El Putxet
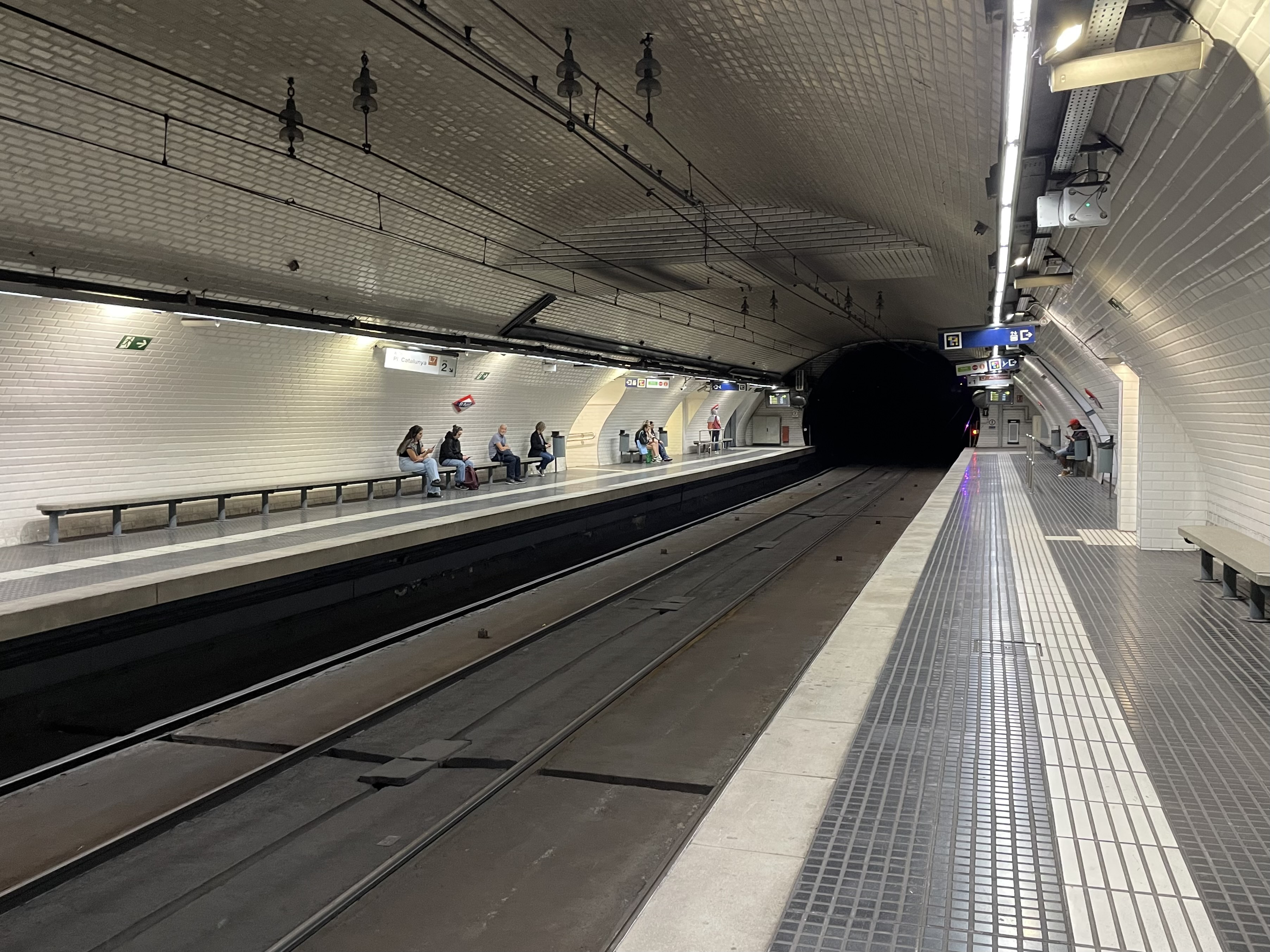

General information
- Location: Carrer de Balmes; Barcelona, Spain
- Coordinates: 41°24′21″N 2°08′21″E
- System: Barcelona Metro rapid transit station
- Owner: Ferrocarrils de la Generalitat de Catalunya
- Platforms: 2 side platforms
- Tracks: 2

Construction
- Structure type: Underground

Other information
- Fare zone: 1 (ATM)

History
- Opened: 1953

Passengers
- 2018: 1,645,173

Services
Preceding station	FGC	Following station
Pàdua towards Barcelona Pl. Catalunya	L7	Av. Tibidabo Terminus
Preceding station	Metro	Following station
Projected
Mandri towards Airport T1	L9	Lesseps towards Can Zam
Mandri towards Polígon Pratenc	L10	Lesseps towards Gorg
Location

El Putxet (Catalan pronunciation: [əl puˈtʃɛt]) is a station of the Barcelona Metro on the FGC-operated line L7 (also known as Línia de Balmes). The station serves the El Putxet quarter of Sarrià-Sant Gervasi, and is situated under Carrer de Balmes.

When first built speculatively in 1929, the station was named Mercado as it sits right next to Mercado de Sant Gervasi. The station remained closed until 1953, when it opened as Núñez de Arce. It received its current name in 1980.

The station has twin tracks, with two 60 metres (200 ft) long side platforms.

== See also ==
- List of Barcelona Metro stations
- List of railway stations in Barcelona
