= Vall d'Hebron University Hospital =

Vall d'Hebron University Hospital Hospital Universitari Vall d'Hebron
- Catalan Health Institute

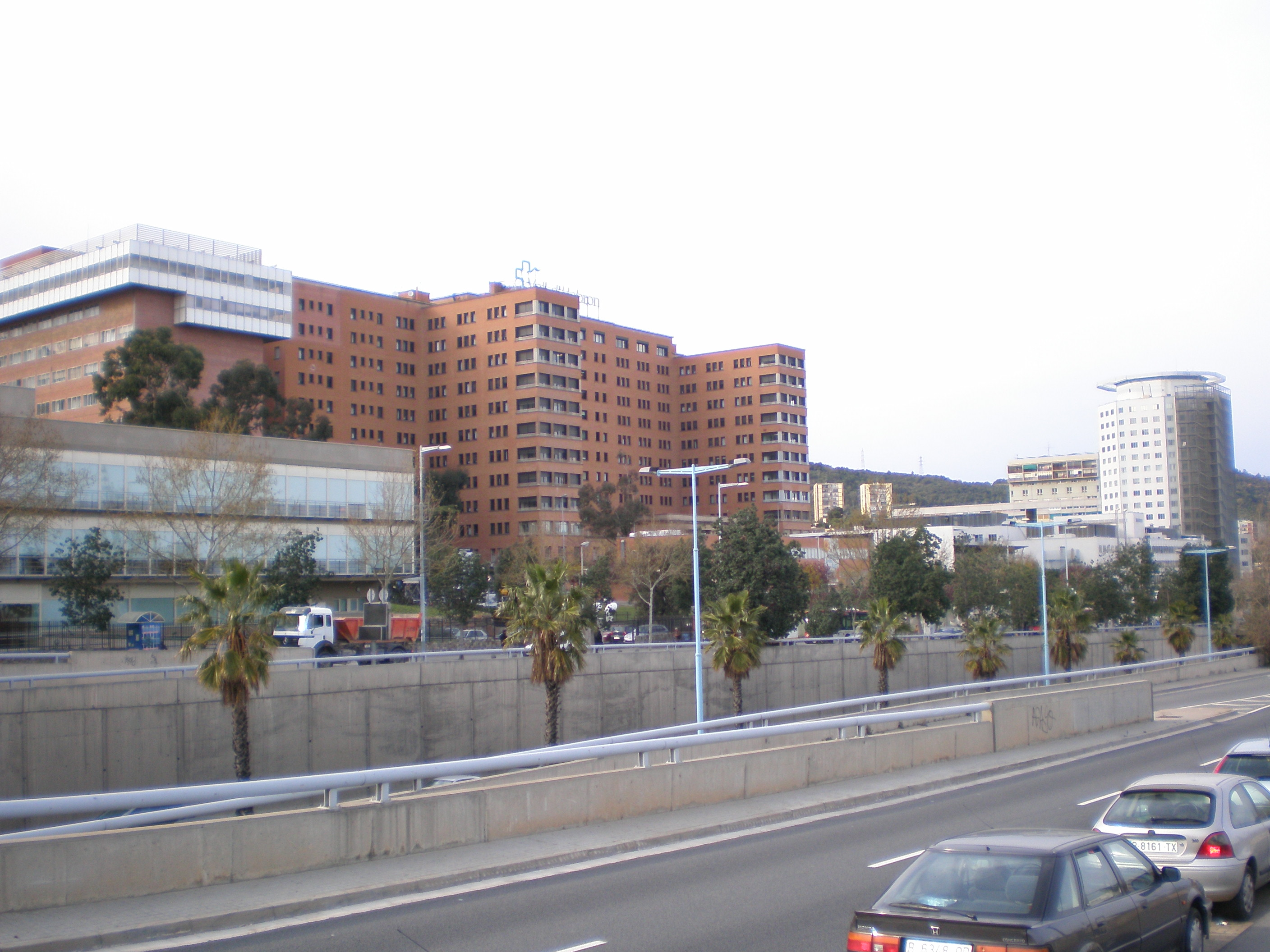

- Location within Catalonia

Geography
- Location: Montbau, Barcelona, Catalonia, Spain
- Coordinates: 41.428083°N 2.142278°E

Organisation
- Care system: Public
- Type: Teaching

Services
- Beds: 1146

History
- Founded: 1955; 71 years ago

Links
- Website: hospital.vallhebron.com
- Lists: Hospitals in Spain

The Vall d'Hebron University Hospital (Catalan: Hospital Universitari Vall d'Hebron) is a public and university affiliated hospital in Catalonia, Spain. Founded in 1955, it belongs to the Catalan Health Institute and is the hospital complex with the highest volume of interventions in Catalonia. It is located at the bottom of Collserola, in the northern Barcelona neighborhood of Montbau, Horta-Guinardó district, and its influence area includes the districts of Nou Barris and Sant Andreu. It is named after the nearby neighborhood of Vall d'Hebron.

In actuality, it is the most important hospital complex in Catalonia. A study from 2009 places the Vall d'Hebron University Hospital among the four most important reference centers in Spain, and one of the twenty most important hospitals in the country.

The hospital complex is divided into three separate areas: the general hospital, the maternity hospital, and the orthopedics and rehabilitation hospital. It also has an outpatient surgical unit at Parc Sanitari Pere Virgili.

It currently employs over 7.000 professionals and has an annual budget of 580 million euros (2012). The hospital has 1,146 beds (182 reserved for critical patients), 45 operating rooms, 381 outpatient offices, and 3 emergency departments.
