= Roquetes station =

Metro station in Barcelona, Spain

Roquetes
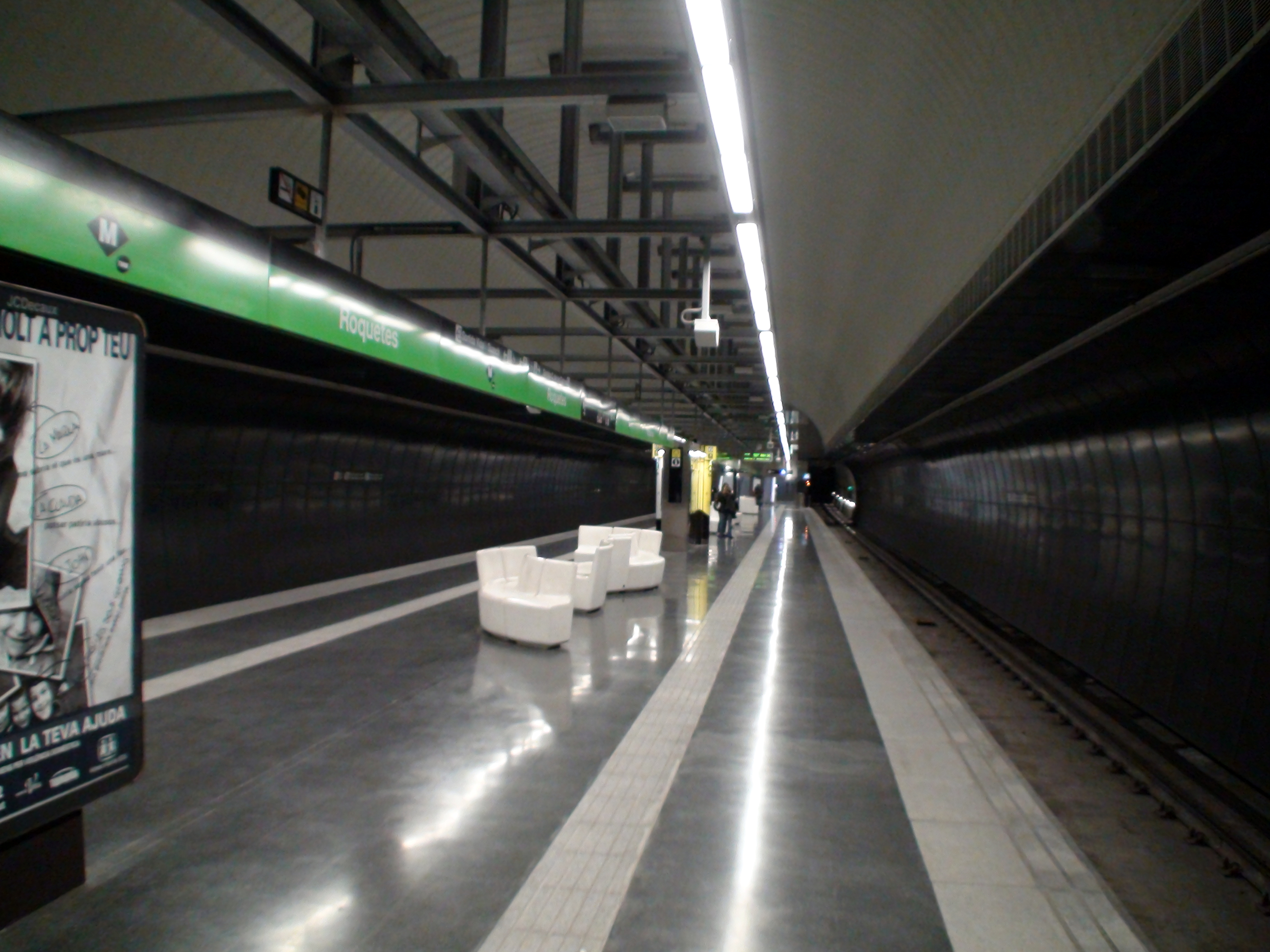
- Station platform

General information
- Location: Barcelona (Nou Barris)
- Coordinates: 41°26′48″N 2°10′32″E
- System: Barcelona Metro rapid transit station
- Owner: Transports Metropolitans de Barcelona
- Platforms: 1 island platform
- Tracks: 2

Construction
- Structure type: Underground

Other information
- Fare zone: 1 (ATM)

History
- Opened: 2008

Services
Preceding station	Metro	Following station
Canyelles towards Zona Universitària	L3	Trinitat Nova Terminus
Location
- Location within Barcelona Location within Province of Barcelona Location within Spain

Roquetes (Catalan pronunciation: [ruˈkɛtəs]) is a Barcelona Metro station, named after the nearby Roquetes neighbourhood, in the Nou Barris district of the city of Barcelona. The station is served by line L3.

The station can be accessed from Carrer Jaume Pinent, Carrer de les Torres and Parc de Roquetes, near Carrer Vidal i Guasch. It's a mixture of a ground-level station with the current deepest sub-surface platform in the system. The single island platform is flanked by two tracks.

The station was opened on 4 October 2008, when the section of line L3 from Canyelles station to Trinitat Nova station was inaugurated.

The current Roquetes station should not be confused with Via Júlia station, on L4, which was known as Roquetes before 1999.

== See also ==
- List of Barcelona Metro stations
