= Fontana station (Barcelona) =

Metro station in Barcelona, Spain

Fontana
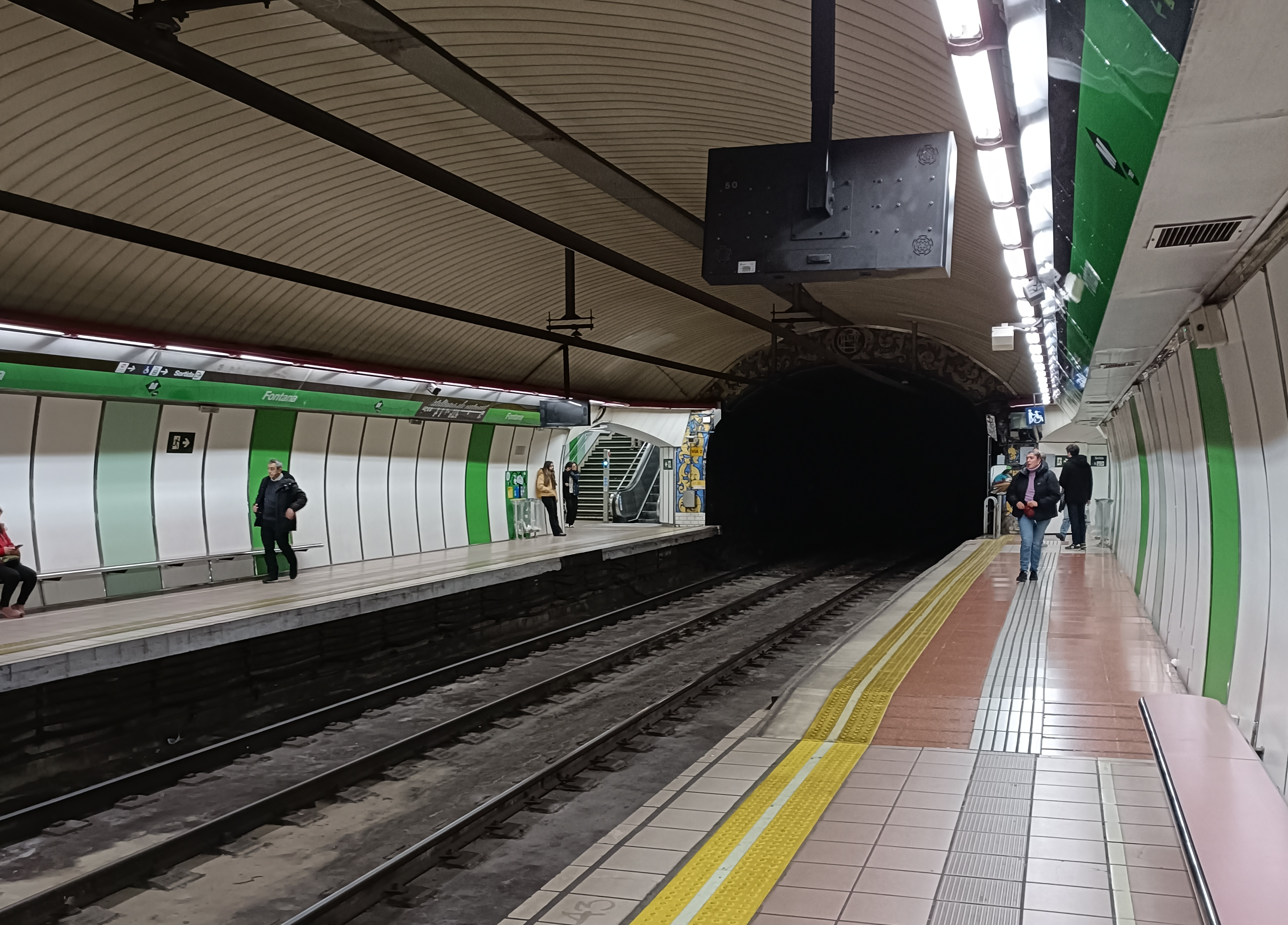

General information
- Location: Barcelona (Gràcia)
- Coordinates: 41°24′8″N 2°9′9″E
- System: Barcelona Metro rapid transit station
- Owner: Transports Metropolitans de Barcelona
- Platforms: 2 side platforms
- Tracks: 2

Construction
- Structure type: Underground

Other information
- Fare zone: 1 (ATM)

History
- Opened: 1924

Services
Preceding station	Metro	Following station
Diagonal towards Zona Universitària	L3	Lesseps towards Trinitat Nova
Location
- Location within Barcelona Location within Spain

Fontana (Catalan pronunciation: [funˈtanə]) is a Barcelona Metro station, located under Carrer Gran de Gràcia and Carrer d'Astúries in the Gràcia district of Barcelona. It is served by L3.

The station opened in 1924 as part of the first metro line of the city, which ran between Catalunya and Lesseps stations. It retains some of its original decoration.

Fontana is one of the few stations in the city accessible via an above-ground ticket hall. This is the only access to the station, and is located on the Carrer Gran de Gràcia next to its junction with the Carrer d'Astúries. It has two tracks, with twin side platforms that are 92 metres (302 ft) long.

== See also ==
- List of Barcelona Metro stations
