= Carrer Gran de Gràcia, Barcelona =

Street in Barcelona, Spain

Coordinates: 41°24′00″N 2°09′19″E

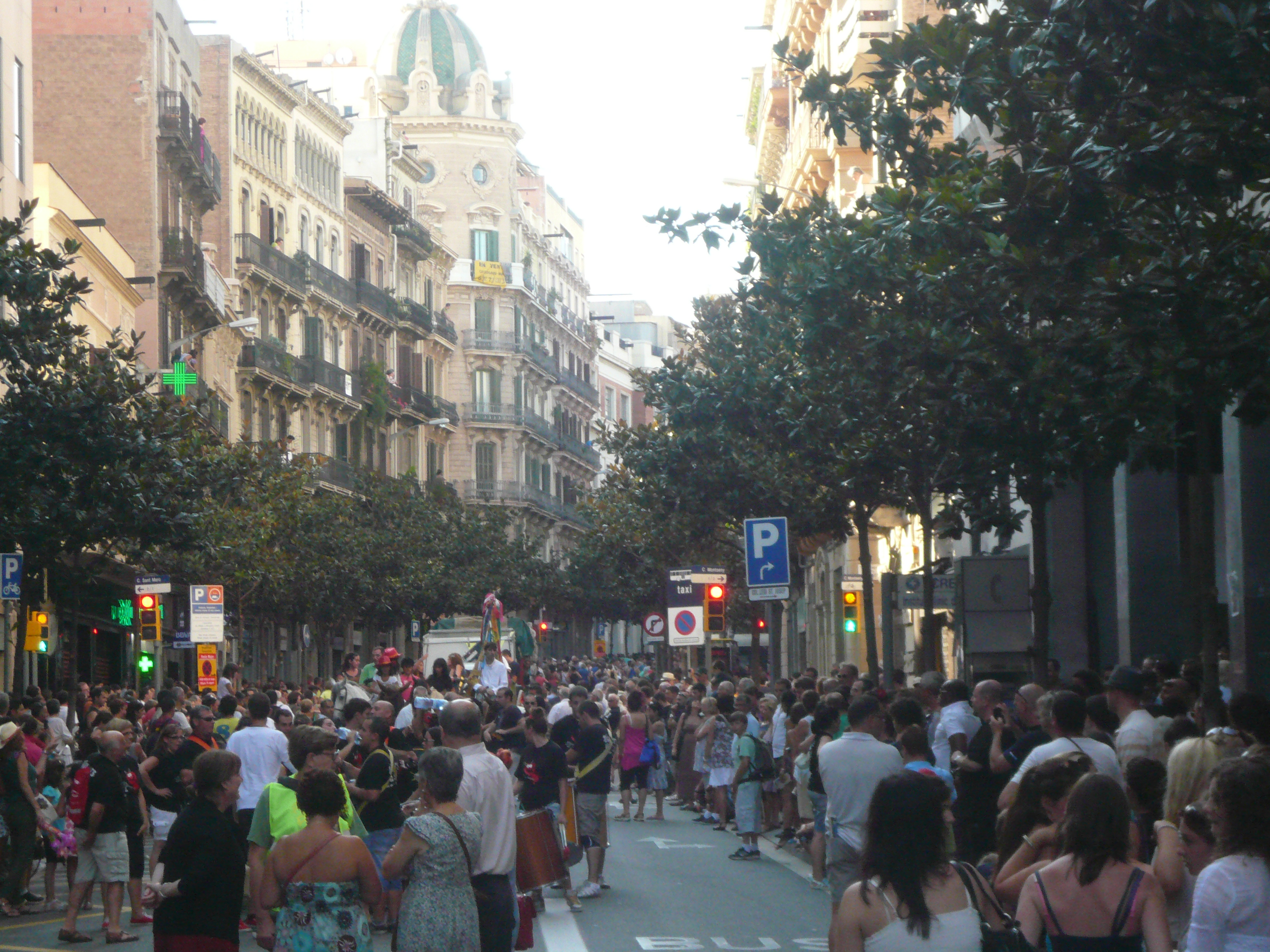
Career Gran de Grácia during the 2011 Festa Major de Grácia

Carrer Gran de Gràcia is the main street of Gràcia, a district of Barcelona, Spain.

Gran de Gràcia is a shopping street that has been the centre of the district's commercial area since the time when Gràcia was a separate town, until 1897. It stretches from the West side of Passeig de Gràcia towards Plaça Lesseps.

== Transport ==
=== Metro ===
- Diagonal (L5, L3, L6)
- Fontana (L3)
- Lesseps (L3)

== See also ==
- Passeig de Gràcia
