= Lesseps station =

Station of the Barcelona Metro network in Spain

Lesseps
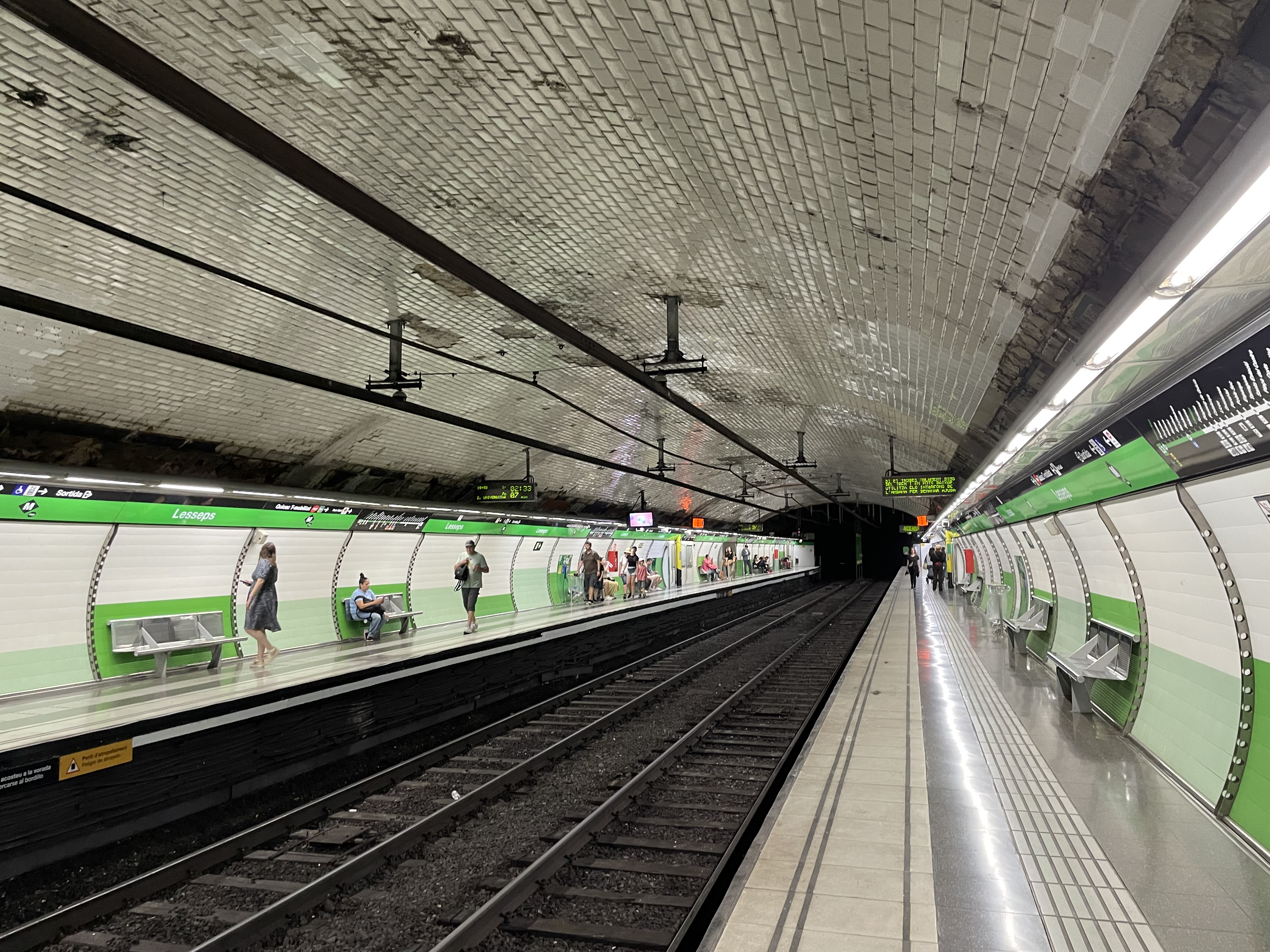
- Platforms in Lesseps

General information
- Location: Barcelona (Gràcia)
- Coordinates: 41°24′22″N 2°8′58″E
- System: Barcelona Metro rapid transit station
- Owner: Transports Metropolitans de Barcelona
- Platforms: 2 side platforms
- Tracks: 2

Construction
- Structure type: Underground

Other information
- Fare zone: 1 (ATM)

History
- Opened: 1924

Services
Preceding station	Metro	Following station
Fontana towards Zona Universitària	L3	Vallcarca towards Trinitat Nova
Projected
El Putxet towards Airport T1	L9	Muntanya towards Can Zam
El Putxet towards Polígon Pratenc	L10	Muntanya towards Gorg
Location
- Location within Barcelona Location within Spain

Lesseps (Catalan pronunciation: [ləˈseps]) is a station in the Barcelona Metro network, named after its location, Plaça de Lesseps, in the Gràcia district of Barcelona, itself named after Ferdinand de Lesseps, who was appointed French consul in 1842. The station is served by line L3.

The station opened in 1924 as the northern terminus of the first metro line of the city, which ran south to Catalunya station and was operated by the Gran Metropolitano de Barcelona rail company. To the north of the station were terminal sidings, which in turn gave access to the Lesseps workshops via a vehicle elevator. The line was extended north to Montbau station in 1985, diverging to the right before the terminal sidings, which remain in existence although little used. The Lesseps workshops closed in 1988.

The station is located under Carrer Gran de Gràcia, between Carrer de Maurici Serrahima and Plaça de Lesseps, and can be accessed from the square, in the corner where Avinguda del Príncep d'Astúries ends. It has two tracks, with twin side platforms that are 95 metres (312 ft) long.

Future plans are for Lesseps to be served by the joint section of lines L9 and L10. Platforms for this are currently under construction, and will provide interchange with line L3.
