= Canyelles station =

Metro station in Barcelona, Spain

Canyelles
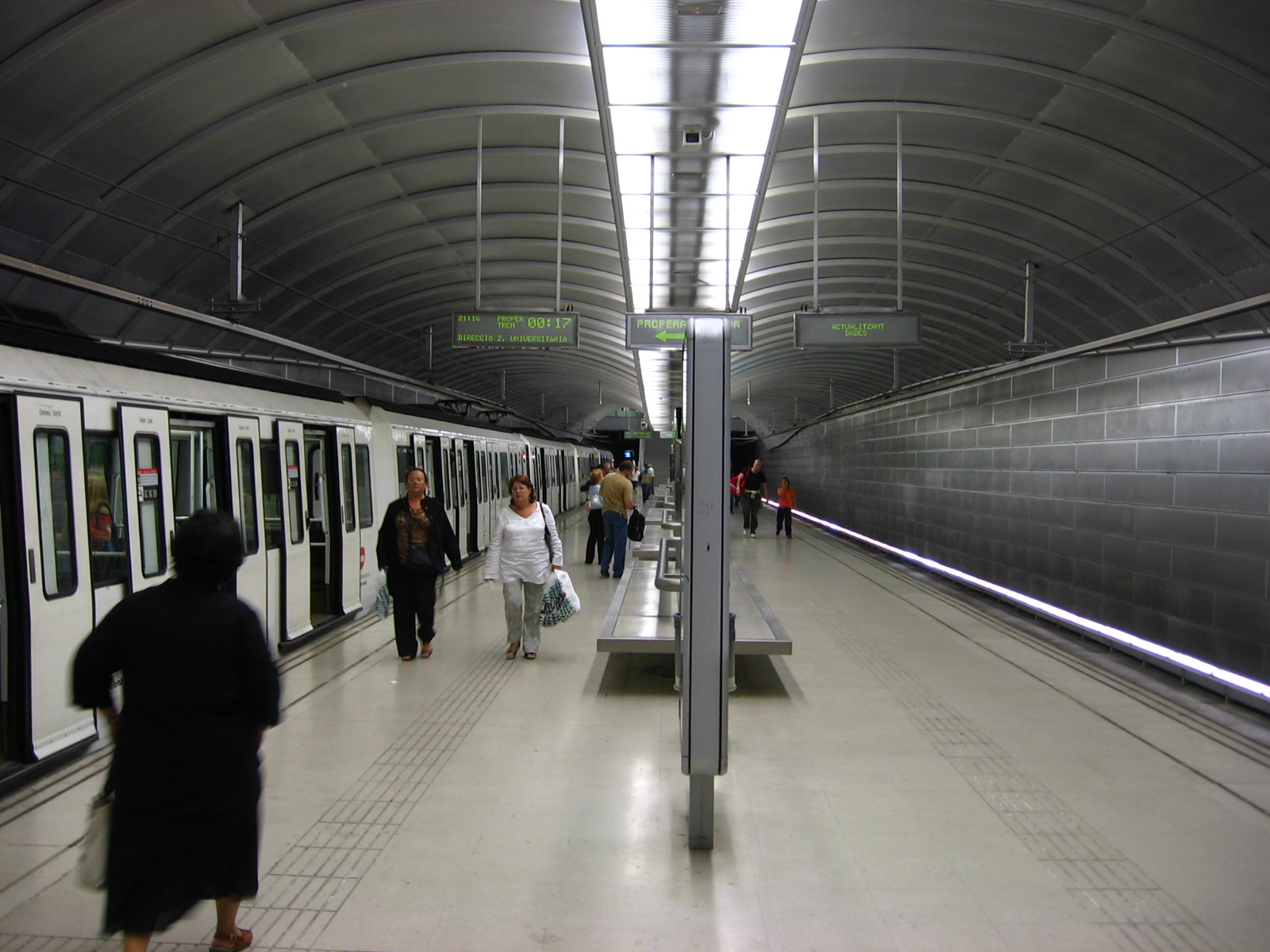

General information
- Location: Barcelona (Nou Barris)
- Coordinates: 41°26′34″N 2°10′4″E
- System: Barcelona Metro rapid transit station
- Owner: Transports Metropolitans de Barcelona
- Platforms: 1 island platform
- Tracks: 2

Construction
- Structure type: Underground

Other information
- Fare zone: 1 (ATM)

History
- Opened: 2001

Services
Preceding station	Metro	Following station
Valldaura towards Zona Universitària	L3	Roquetes towards Trinitat Nova
Location
- Location within Barcelona Location within Spain

Canyelles (Catalan pronunciation: [kəˈɲeʎəs]) is a Barcelona Metro station, named after the nearby Canyelles neighbourhood, in the Nou Barris district of the city of Barcelona. The station is served by line L3.

The station is located under Carrer de Federico García Lorca and Via Favència-Ronda de Dalt. It has an access on each side of the station on to Mercat-García Lorca and Via Favència, and Parc de Josep Maria Serra Martí. The single 100-metre (330 ft) long island platform is flanked by two tracks.

The station was opened in 2001, when the section of line L3 was extended from Montbau station. It remained the terminus of line L3 until 2008, when the line was further extended to Trinitat Nova station.

Canyelles station was designed by Alfons Soldevila and is considerably more modern-looking than most of the city's other stations.

== Gallery ==
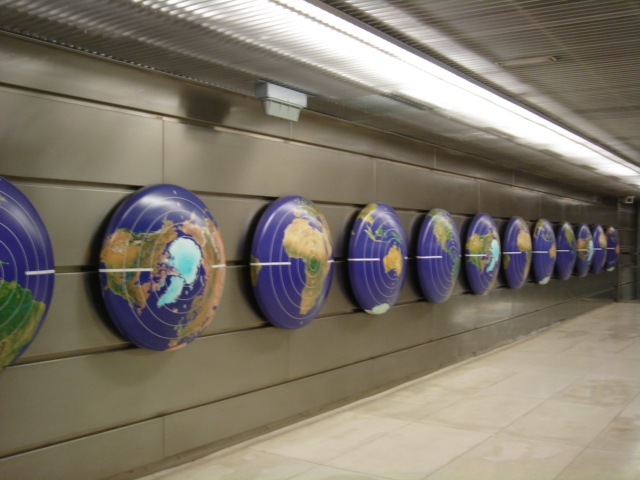
Detail on a wall in the Canyelles metro station

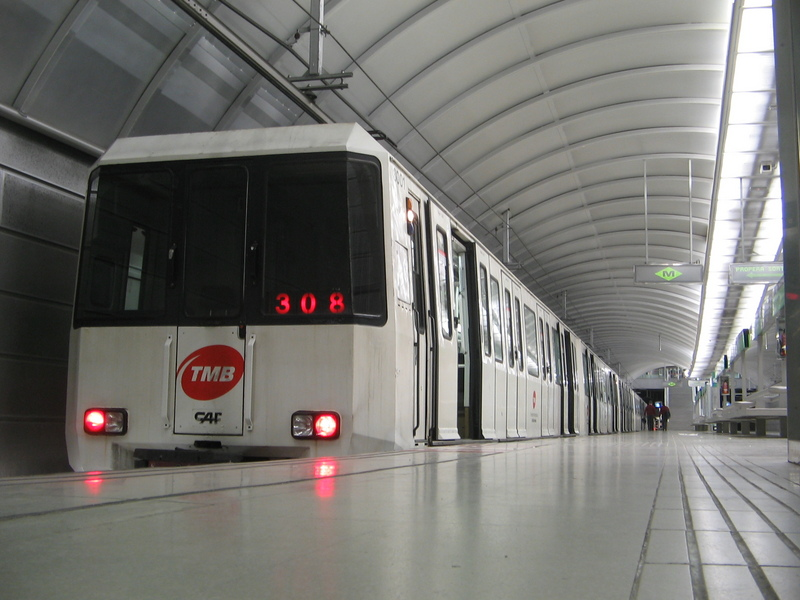
A Series 3000 train in the platform
