= Mundet station =

Metro station in Barcelona, Spain

Mundet
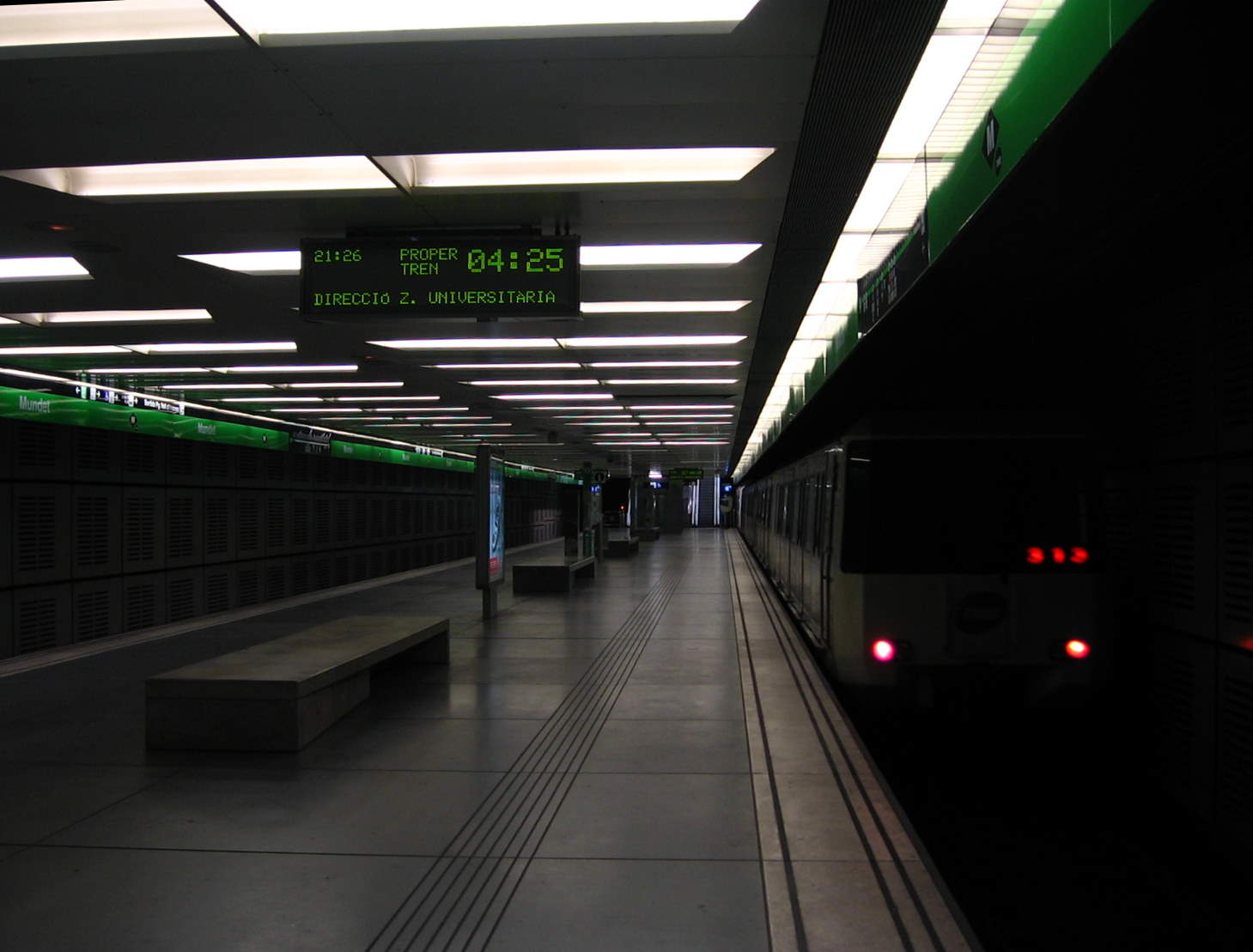

General information
- Location: Barcelona (Horta-Guinardó)
- Coordinates: 41°26′7″N 2°8′57″E
- System: Barcelona Metro rapid transit station
- Owner: Transports Metropolitans de Barcelona
- Platforms: 1 island platform
- Tracks: 2

Construction
- Structure type: Underground

Other information
- Fare zone: 1 (ATM)

History
- Opened: 2001

Services
Preceding station	Metro	Following station
Montbau towards Zona Universitària	L3	Valldaura towards Trinitat Nova
Location
- Location within Barcelona Location within Spain

Mundet (Catalan pronunciation: [munˈdɛt]) is a Barcelona Metro station, in the Horta-Guinardó district of Barcelona, which takes its name from the Recinte Mundet, an adjacent area that now houses a campus of the University of Barcelona. The station is served by line L3.

The station is located underneath the Passeig de la Vall d'Hebron and the Ronda de Dalt expressway, between Avinguda de Can Marcet and Passeig dels Castanyers. Access to the station is provided by an underground passageway allowing passengers to cross under the Ronda de Dalt; access is by stairs, escalators, and elevators north of the station, and level to the south, allowing the station to be supplied with natural light. One level below the passageway is a single 100-metre (330 ft) long island platform served by two flanking tracks.

The station was opened in 2001, when the section of line L3 from Montbau station to Canyelles station was inaugurated. It was designed by Ventura Valcarce.

== Gallery ==
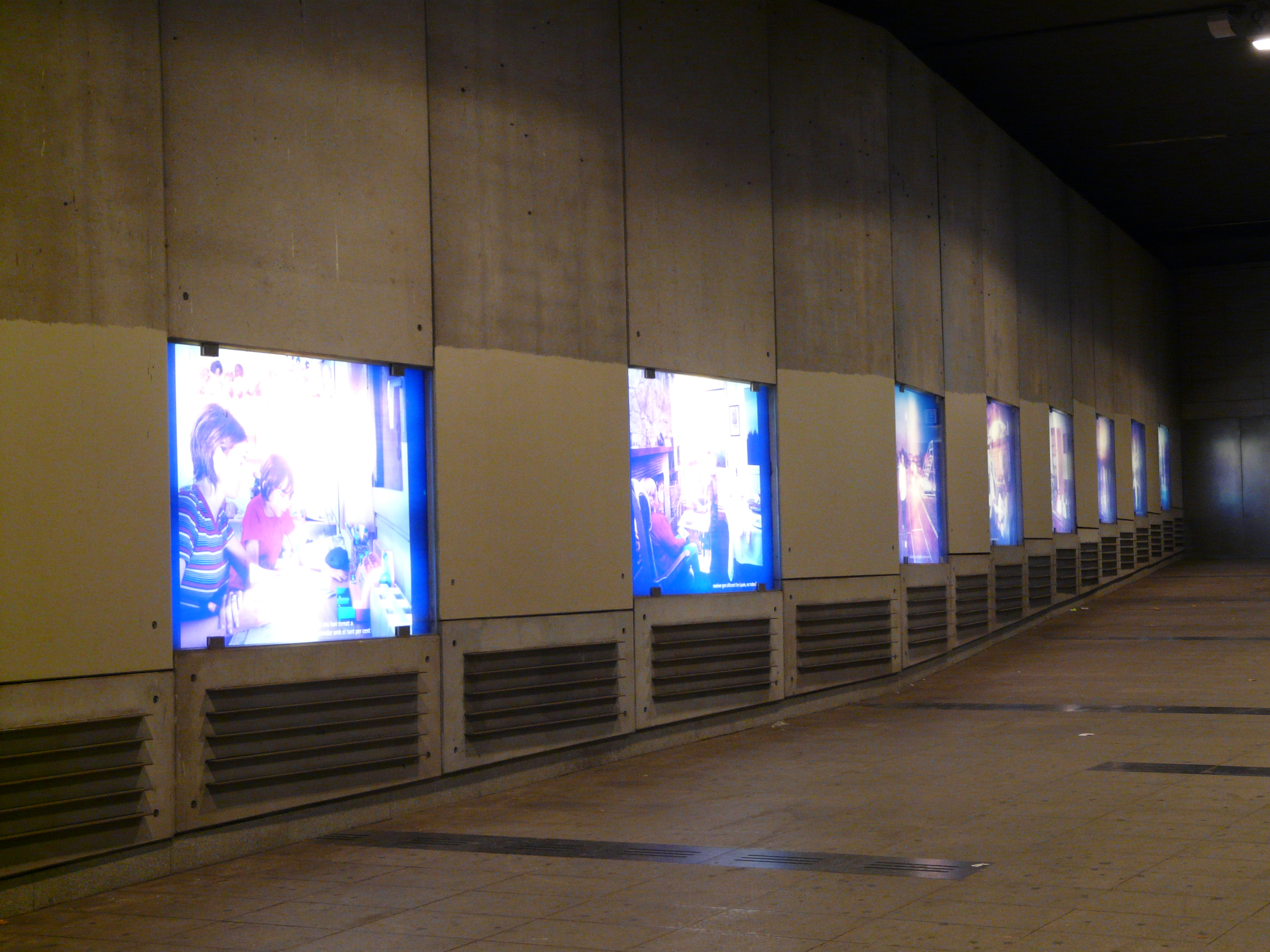
Artwork in the station access

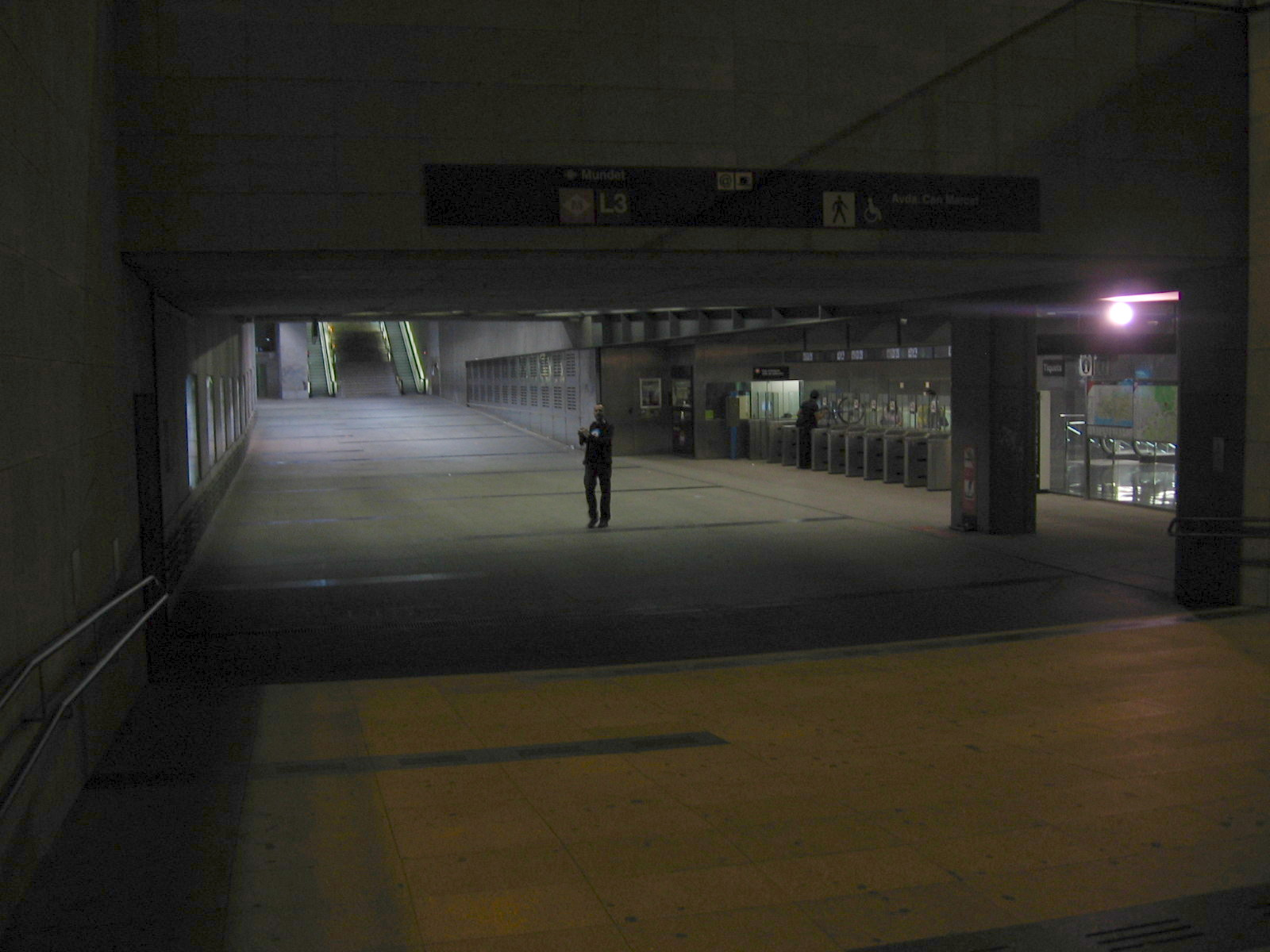
Underground passage
