= Drassanes station =

Metro station in Barcelona, Spain

Drassanes
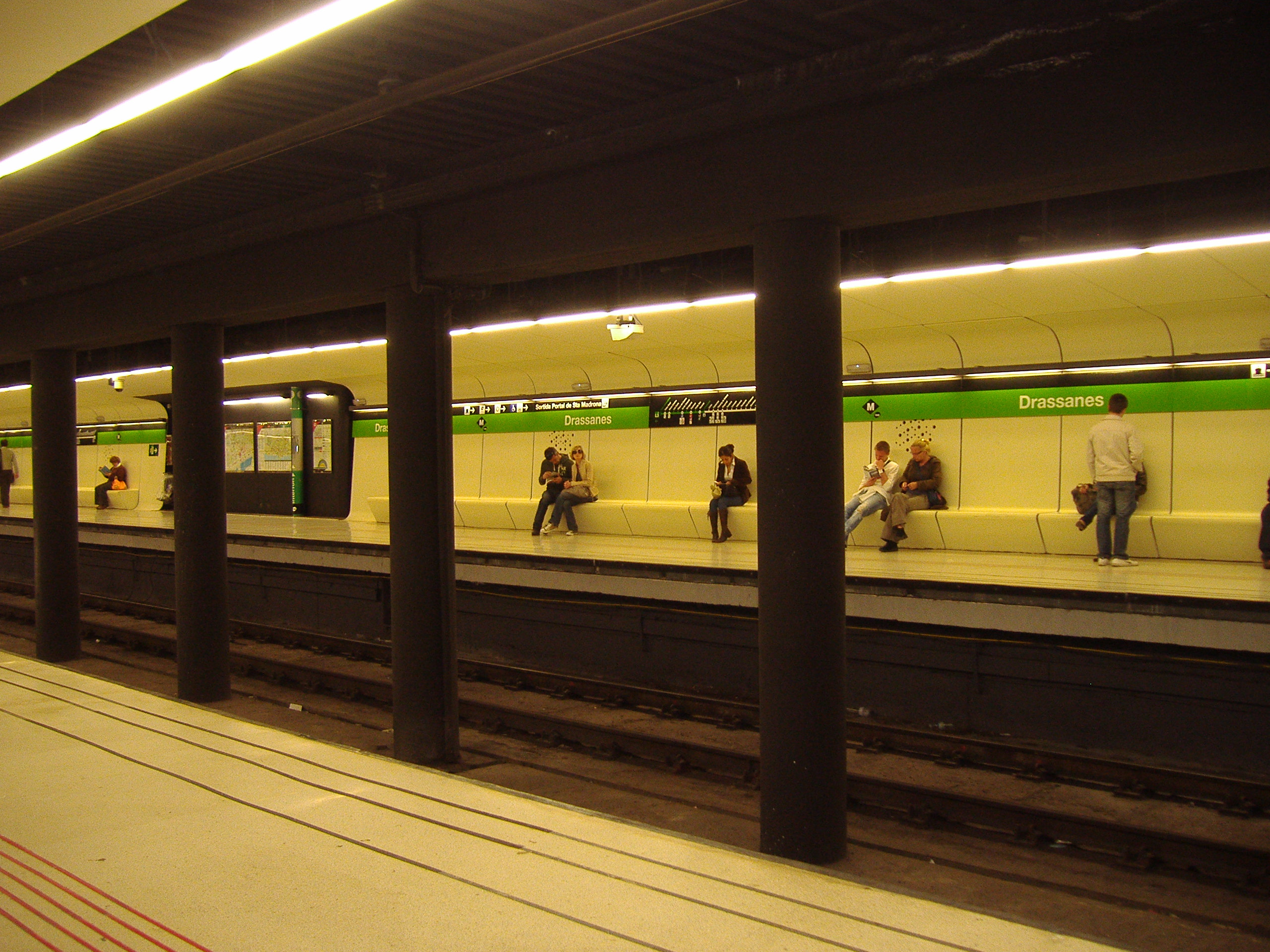

General information
- Location: Barcelona (Ciutat Vella)
- Coordinates: 41°22′36″N 2°10′32″E
- System: Barcelona Metro station
- Operator: TMB
- Platforms: 2 side platforms

Construction
- Accessible: yes

Other information
- Fare zone: Zone 1

History
- Opened: 14 December 1968

Services
Preceding station	Metro	Following station
Paral·lel towards Zona Universitària	L3	Liceu towards Trinitat Nova
Location
- Location within Barcelona Location within Spain

La Rambla | Drassanes (Catalan pronunciation: [dɾəˈsanəs]) is a Barcelona Metro station located underneath Portal de la Santa Madrona, just off La Rambla in the Ciutat Vella district of Barcelona. It is named after the nearby Drassanes Reials de Barcelona, the old shipyards that are now the home of the Museu Marítim de Barcelona. It is the closest station to the Port of Barcelona and one of the network's closest stations to the sea, and is served by TMB-operated Barcelona Metro line L3.

The station was opened on 14 December 1968 as a prolongation on the line from Liceu once Fernando metro station was closed. Originally known as Atarazanas, the name was changed to Drassanes in 1982, then La Rambla | Drassanes in 2022. Due to its proximity to the sea and low level, the station has suffered from flooding in the past. It was completely rebuilt in 2007 to make it more accessible by modernizing the platforms and installing elevators.

Because of its proximity to sea level, the station is located close to the surface and has only a single level, containing two tracks served by two 90 metres (300 ft) long side platforms. The platforms are linked by a passage under the tracks, but each has its own separate access to the street. The Zona Universitària bound platform has access to Drassanes Avenue and Portal de la Santa Madrona, while the Trinitat Nova bound platform has access to the central promenade of La Rambla

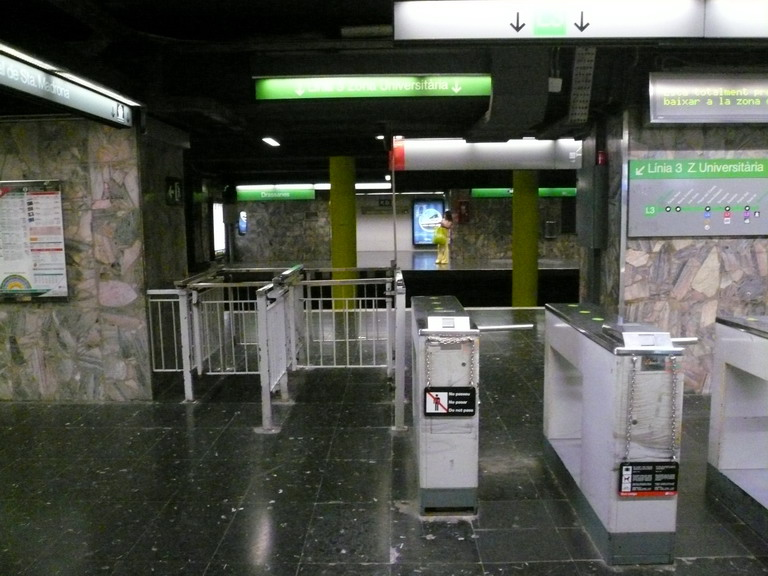
Ticket gates on the Zona Universitària side before the remodelling

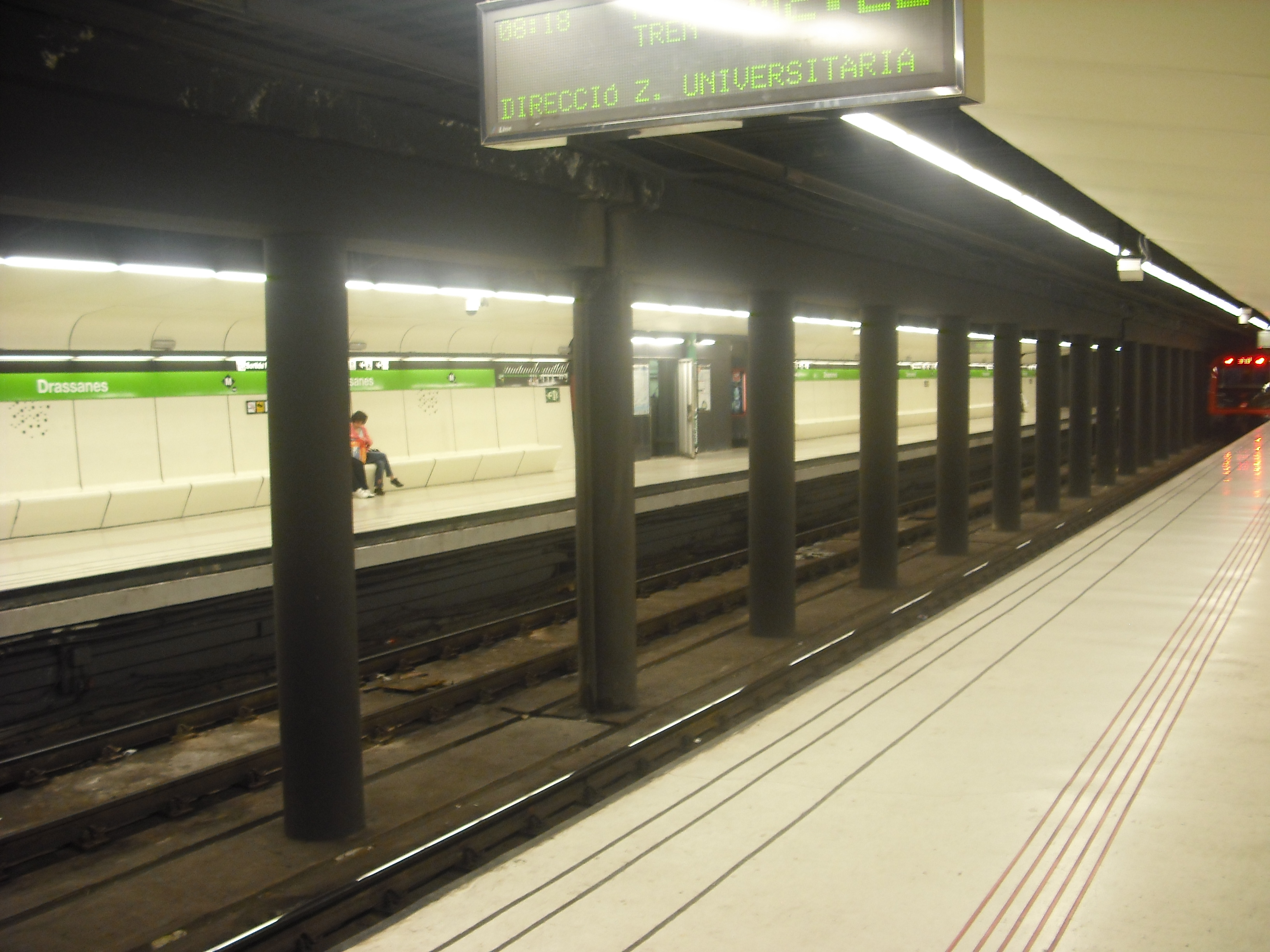
Another view of the platforms with a train toward Zona Universitària

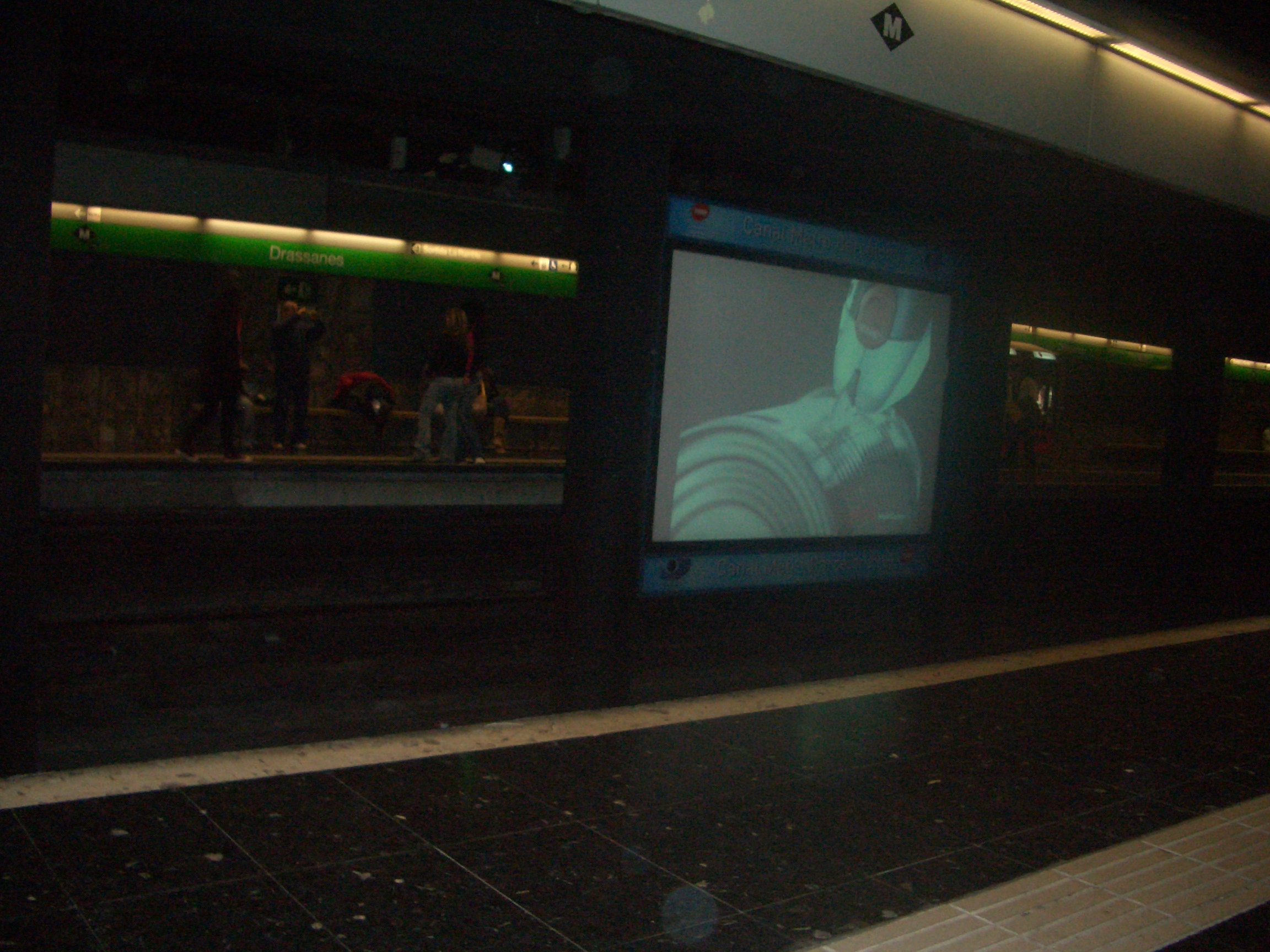
TV screen in the station before the remodelling
