= Montbau station =

Metro station in Barcelona, Spain

Montbau
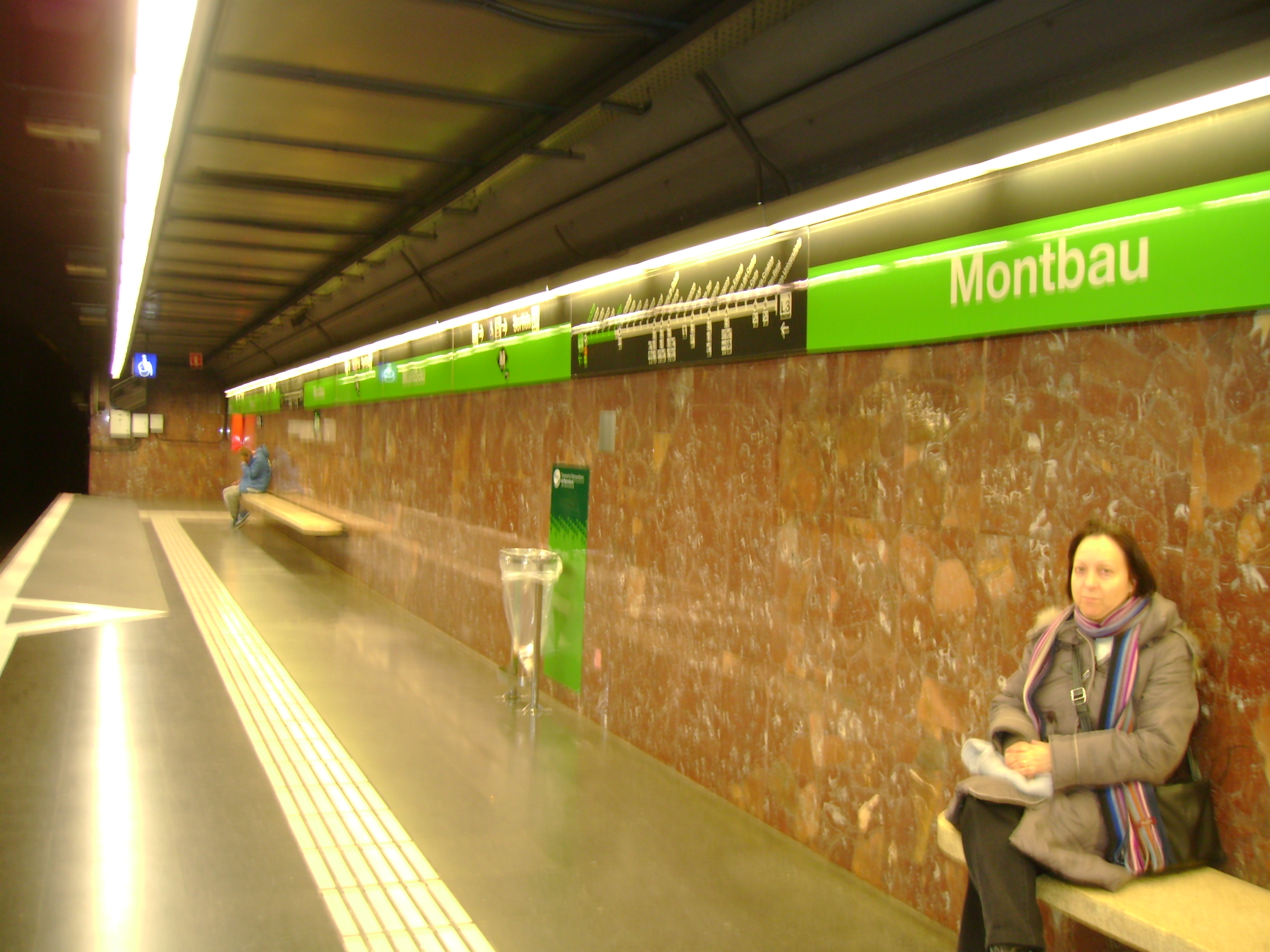
- Station platforms

General information
- Location: Barcelona (Horta-Guinardó)
- Coordinates: 41°25′48″N 2°8′41″E
- System: Barcelona Metro rapid transit station
- Owner: Transports Metropolitans de Barcelona
- Platforms: 2 side platforms
- Tracks: 2

Construction
- Structure type: Underground

Other information
- Fare zone: 1 (ATM)

History
- Opened: 1985

Services
Preceding station	Metro	Following station
Vall d'Hebron towards Zona Universitària	L3	Mundet towards Trinitat Nova
Location
- Location within Barcelona Location within Spain

Montbau (Catalan pronunciation: [ˌmomˈbaw]) is a Barcelona Metro station, in the Horta-Guinardó district of Barcelona, and named after the nearby Montbau neighbourhood. The station is served by line L3.

The station is located underneath the Passeig de la Vall d'Hebron and the Ronda de Dalt expressway, between Carrer de l'Arquitectura and Carrer Pare Mariana. The station has a single ticket hall with two entrances; as the station is on a mountainside, one of the entrances is actually below the ticket hall level, requiring passengers to climb stairs up, but in August 2009 a new entrance has been open with no stairs to climb. There are two 91-metre (299 ft) long side platforms.

The station was opened in 1985, when the section of line L3 from Lesseps station was inaugurated. It remained the terminus of the line until the extension to Canyelles station opened in 2001.
