= Barcelona Metro line 3 =

Rapid transit line in Barcelona, Spain

Coordinates: 41°23′04.00″N 2°6′43.20″E

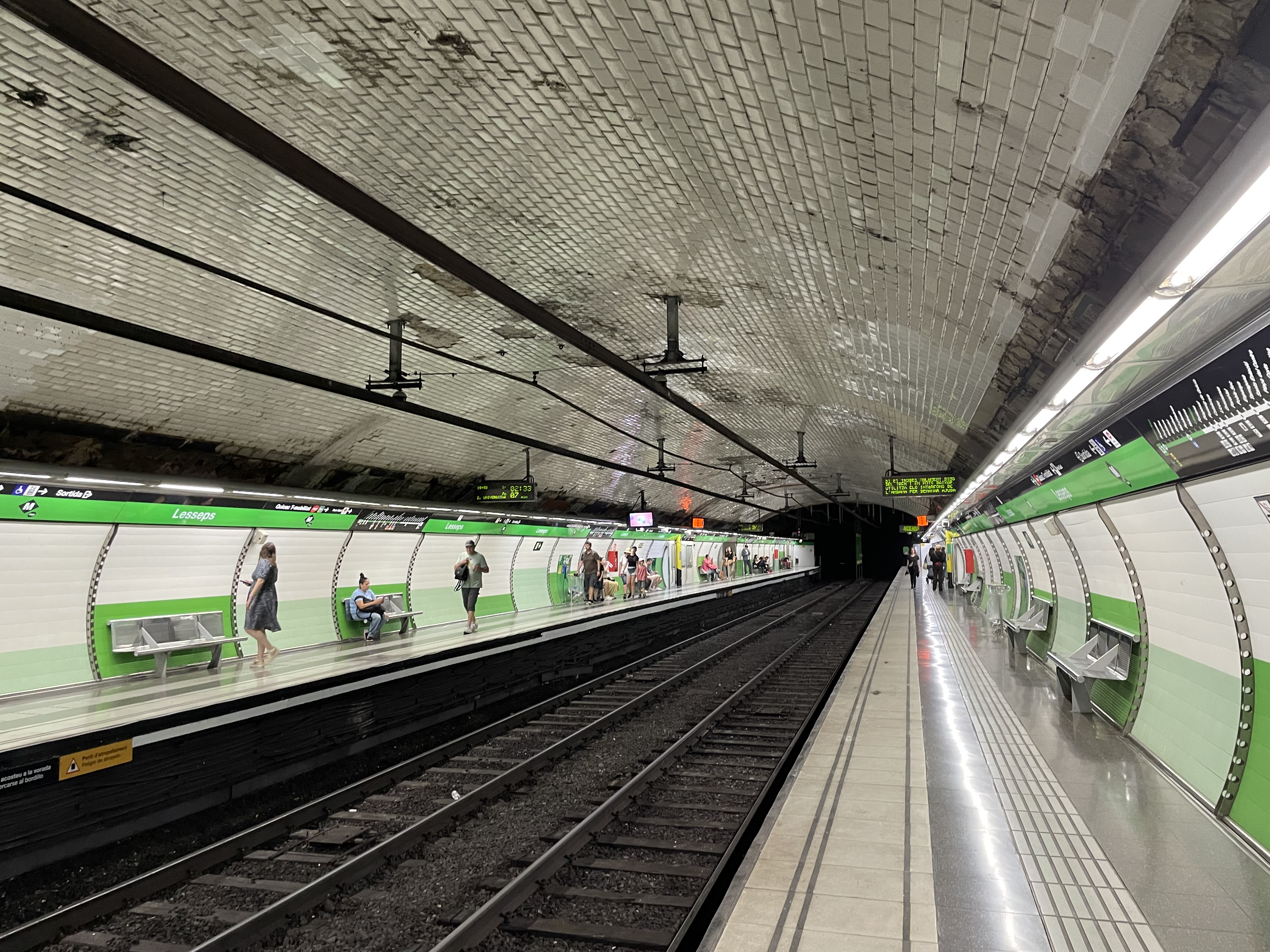
- Platforms at Lesseps

Overview
- Service type: Rapid transit
- Locale: Barcelona
- First service: 1982; 44 years ago
- Current operator: TMB

Route
- Termini: Zona Universitària; Trinitat Nova
- Stops: 26
- Distance travelled: 18.4 km (11.4 mi)
- Average journey time: 30 minutes

Technical
- Rolling stock: 5000 and 7000 series Vall d'Hebron depot
- Track gauge: 1,435 mm (4 ft 8 1/2 in) standard gauge
- Electrification: 1,200 V DC rigid overhead wire
- Track owner: TMB

Line 3 (Catalan pronunciation: [ˈlini.ə ˈtɾɛs]), coloured green and often simply referred to as Línia verda ([ˈlini.ə ˈbɛrdə]; "Green line"), is a metro line in Barcelona operated by TMB, and therefore part of the fare-integrated ATM transport network of the urban region. This V-shaped line is the result of the junction of two related lines: the original L3 and L3B, in 1982. The central section of L3 has the city's oldest metro stations, built in the mid-1920s, with additions almost every decade since then. All of L3 stations are underground.

Its current termini are Zona Universitària, which serves the University of Barcelona campus located on the western end of Avinguda Diagonal in Les Corts district, and Trinitat Nova in Nou Barris. There are plans for it to be extended from Trinitat Nova to Trinitat Vella, providing a connection with Line 1, and also from Zona Universitària to nearby suburbs in the Baix Llobregat area.

== Overview ==
Line L3 is the oldest line in the metro network, having opened in 1924 under the name Gran Metro de Barcelona with the occasion of the 1927 World Fair, joining Plaça Lesseps with Plaça Catalunya, the latter becoming the central underground station in the city and a terminus of both metro lines. It was operated by now defunct Compañía del Gran Metro de Barcelona (GMB). Nowadays it covers a V-shaped area between the west end of Avinguda Diagonal (Zona Universitària) and Canyelles as a result of the integration of the original L3 and a subsidiary line called L3B or L3bis which appeared in 1975 joining Drassanes with Zona Universitària, and which became part of a larger L3 in 1982 when the infrastructures of both joined and they became fare-integrated. A section of the original L3 disappeared as plans to extend it in that direction would have required too much effort and the construction of L4 provided coverage for the line. These former stations of L3 remain unused.

=== Chronology ===
- 1924 – Catalunya-Lesseps section opened.
- 1925 – Fontana station opened. Catalunya-Liceu section opened.
- 1926 – Passeig de Gràcia-Jaume I section opened.
- 1934 – Jaume I-Correos section opened.
- 1946 – Liceu-Fernando section opened.
- 1968 – Fernando-Drassanes section opened.
- 1970 – Drassanes-Paral·lel section opened.
- 1972 – Passeig de Gràcia-Correos section closed.
- 1975 – Paral·lel-Zona Universitària section opened (as L3B).
- 1982 – L3B integrated into L3.
- 1985 – Lesseps-Montbau section opened.
- 2001 – Montbau-Canyelles section opened.
- 2008 – Canyelles-Trinitat Nova section opened.

== Stations ==
Station	Image	District	Opened	Interchanges
Zona Universitària		Les Corts	20 January 1975	Barcelona Metro Barcelona Metro line 9 Trambaix
Palau Reial		Les Corts	20 January 1975	Trambaix
Maria Cristina		Les Corts	20 January 1975	Trambaix
Les Corts		Les Corts	20 January 1975	
Plaça del Centre		Les Corts	20 January 1975	
Sants Estació		Sants-Montjuïc	20 January 1975	Renfe
Tarragona		Sants-Montjuïc	20 January 1975	
Espanya		Sants-Montjuïc	15 July 1975	Barcelona Metro Barcelona Metro line 1 Ferrocarrils de la Generalitat de Catalunya Barcelona Metro line 8 Llobregat–Anoia Line
Poble Sec		Sants-Montjuïc	15 July 1975	
Paral·lel		Sants-Montjuïc	17 July 1970	Barcelona Metro Barcelona Metro line 2 Funicular de Montjuïc
Drassanes		Ciutat Vella	14 December 1968	
Liceu		Ciutat Vella	5 July 1925	
Catalunya		Eixample	30 December 1924	Barcelona Metro Barcelona Metro line 1 Ferrocarrils de la Generalitat de Catalunya Barcelona–Vallès Line Rodalies de Catalunya R1–RG1 (Rodalies de Catalunya) R3 (Rodalies de Catalunya) R4 (Rodalies de Catalunya)
Passeig de Gràcia		Eixample	30 December 1924	Renfe
Diagonal		Eixample	30 December 1924	Barcelona Metro Barcelona Metro line 5 Ferrocarrils de la Generalitat de Catalunya Barcelona–Vallès Line
Fontana		Gràcia	1 May 1925	
Lesseps		Gràcia	30 December 1924	
Vallcarca		Gràcia	6 November 1985	
Penitents		Gràcia	6 November 1985	
Vall d'Hebron		Horta-Guinardó	6 November 1985	Barcelona Metro Barcelona Metro line 5
Montbau		Horta-Guinardó	6 November 1985	
Mundet		Horta-Guinardó	21 September 2001	
Valldaura		Horta-Guinardó	21 September 2001	
Canyelles		Nou Barris	21 September 2001	
Roquetes		Nou Barris	4 July 2008	
Trinitat Nova		Nou Barris	4 July 2008	Barcelona Metro Barcelona Metro line 4 Barcelona Metro line 11

== Map ==
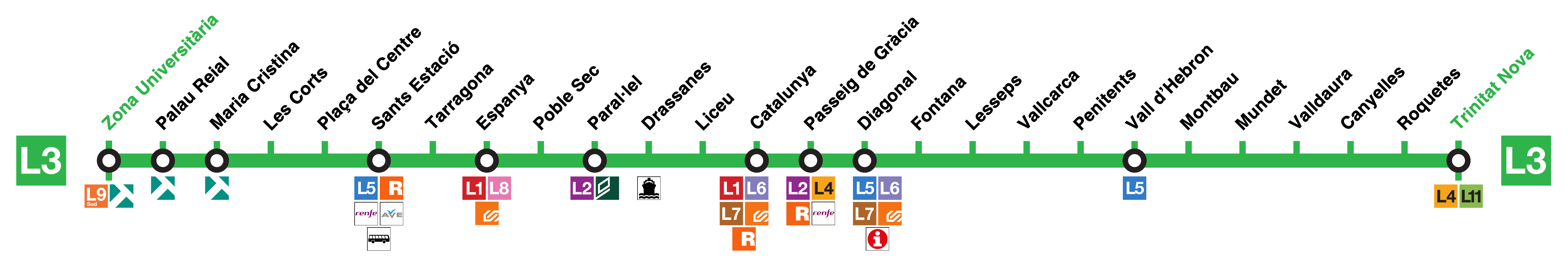

=== Former stations ===
Original stations, 1924–1934.

- Fernando
- Banco (currently on tracks used by L4)
- Correos (currently on tracks used by L4)
