= 1986 in chess =

Events in chess in 1986.

== Events ==
- 1986 was the year the world saw Anatoly Karpov and Garry Kasparov play for the World Chess Championship. The match was actually a rematch between the two opponents as the 1985 matched was called off after 48 games. This championship match was unique in that both men were Soviets and yet it was the first time that the world championship took place outside of Moscow. The championship took place in London and Leningrad from July 28-October 8. Piccadilly, London hosted the first 12 games; games 13-24 were held in Leningrad. Kasparov defended his World Champion title in a close match against the challenger Karpov: 12½ -11½.
- Nigel Short won the Hoogovens Wijk aan Zee Chess Tournament 1986, held in January.
- Women's world champion Maia Chiburdanidze defended her title for the fourth time in the Women's World Chess Championship 1986, held in Sofia.

== Births ==
- Gabriel Flom - 27 January
- Valeriy Aveskulov - 31 January
- Luca Shytaj - 3 February
- Andrei Murariu - 17 February
- Levan Pantsulaia - 26 February
- Alexandre Danin - 14 March
- Anuar Ismagambetov - 21 March
- Saptarshi Roy - 21 March
- Boris Grachev - 27 March
- Alexey Kim - 5 April
- Tatiana Kosintseva - 11 April
- Pavel Anisimov - 19 April
- Levon Babujian - 8 May
- Pentala Harikrishna - 10 May
- Vugar Gashimov - 24 July

== Deaths ==
- Gedeon Barcza - 21 February
- Borislav Milić - 28 May
- Georgy Agzamov - 27 August
