= Ciutat Meridiana station =

Metro station in Barcelona, Spain

Ciutat Meridiana
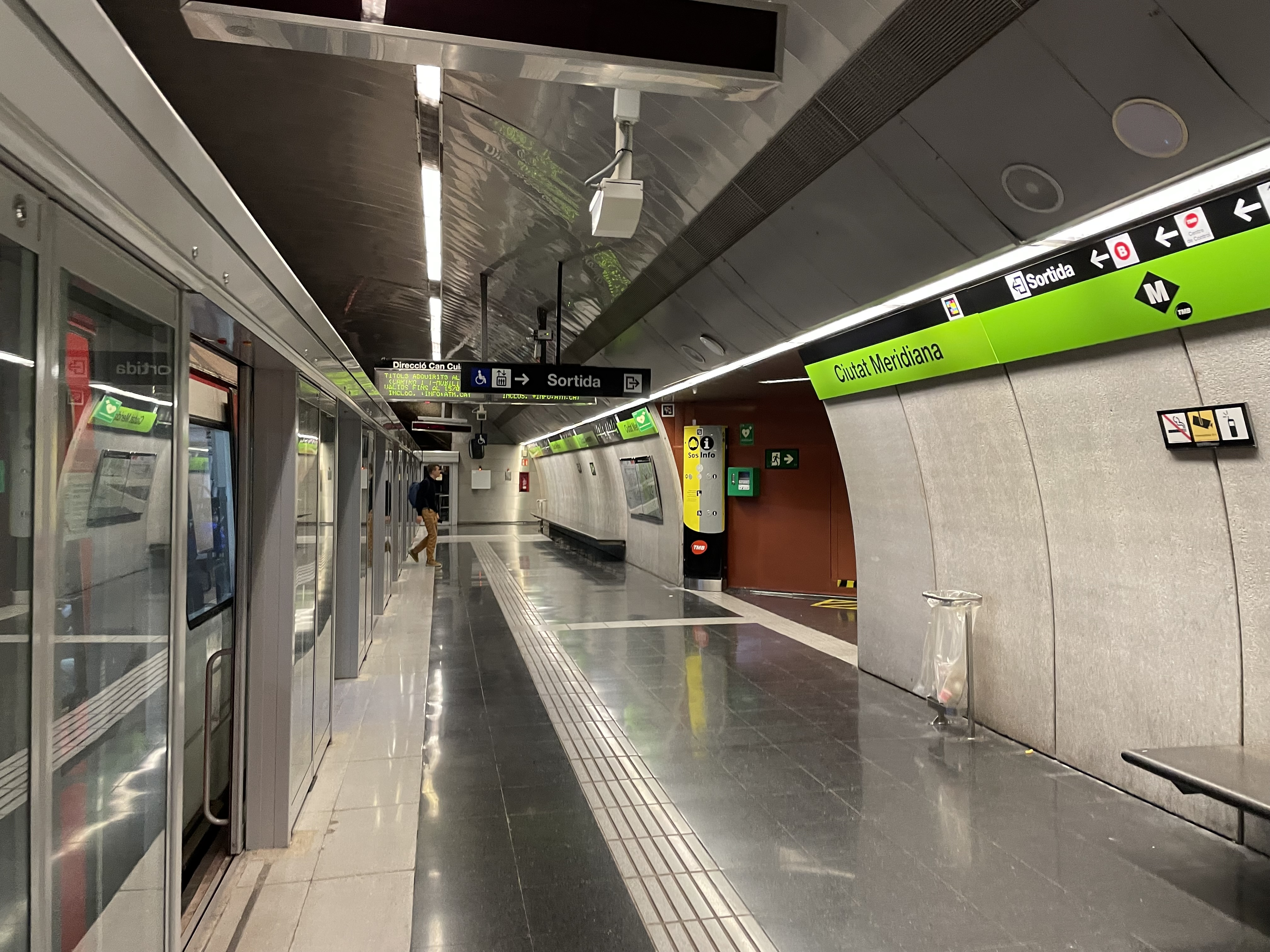
- The station's platform in 2023

General information
- Location: Ciutat Meridiana, Nou Barris, Barcelona
- Coordinates: 41.4609°N 2.1744°E
- System: Barcelona Metro rapid transit station
- Owner: Transports Metropolitans de Barcelona
- Operator: Transports Metropolitans de Barcelona
- Platforms: 1
- Tracks: 1

Construction
- Structure type: Underground
- Accessible: Disabled access

History
- Opened: 2003

Passengers
- 2024: 587.044

Services
Preceding station	Metro	Following station
Can Cuiàs Terminus	L11	Torre Baró | Vallbona towards Trinitat Nova
Location

Ciutat Meridiana (Catalan pronunciation: [siwˈtad məɾiðiˈanə]) is a station on Line 11 of the Barcelona Metro. It is located in the neighborhood of Ciutat Meridiana, in the Nou Barris district of Barcelona. Opened along the rest of the line in 2003, it is currently the only Barcelona Metro station in Ciutat Meridiana.

== Location ==
The station is named after the neighborhood of the Nou Barris district it serves. Ciutat Meridiana is one of the most remote neighborhoods in Barcelona, bordering the municipality of Montcada i Reixac on the hills of Collserola. The historically disconnected neighborhood is characterized by tall, high-density apartment buildings on the hilly terrain.

The station is located deep under the streets of Carrer del Pedraforca and Avinguda dels Rasos de Peguera. The station's only access is found next to the intersection of these two streets.

Due to the hilly terrain of Ciutat Meridiana, the station is the deepest on Line 11 at 50 meters deep.

== History ==
Ciutat Meridiana was opened on December 14, 2003, like the rest of Line 11. The station has only one track and one platform, as Casa de l'Aigua.

Due to the hilly topography of Ciutat Meridiana, the station had to be built at a depth of 50 meters. 3 elevators allow passengers to move between the station's fare gates and the platform. It was the deepest station on the network until 2008, when Roquetes opened on Line 3.

In 2008, platform screen doors were installed on the station's platform to allow for automated operation, which would begin in 2009.

In 2024, Ciutat Meridiana was used by 587.044 passengers.

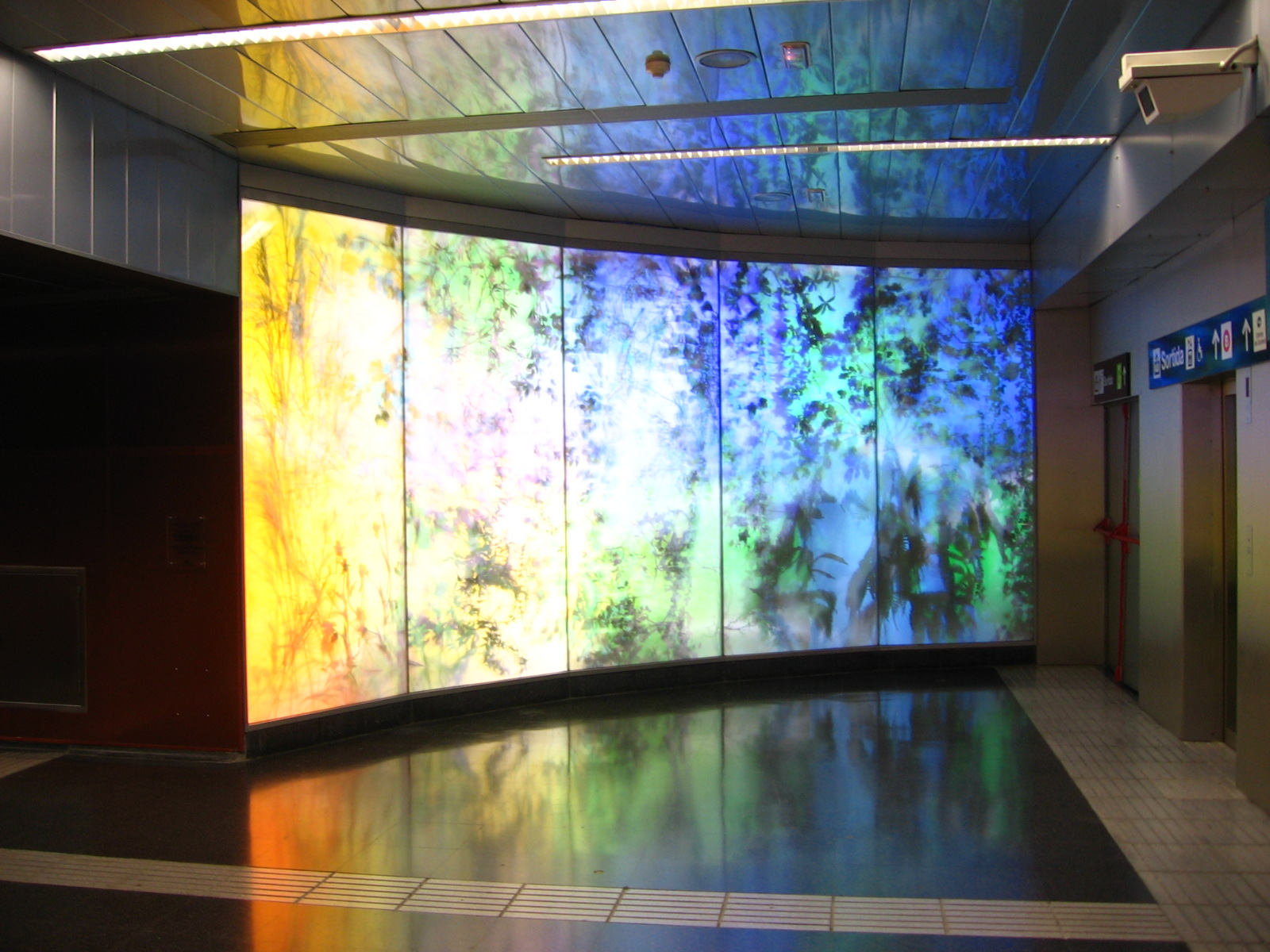
Artwork decorating the waiting area for the elevators

== See also ==
- List of Barcelona Metro stations
- Barcelona Metro line 11
