= Torre Baró/Vallbona station =

Metro station in Barcelona, Spain

Torre Baró | Vallbona
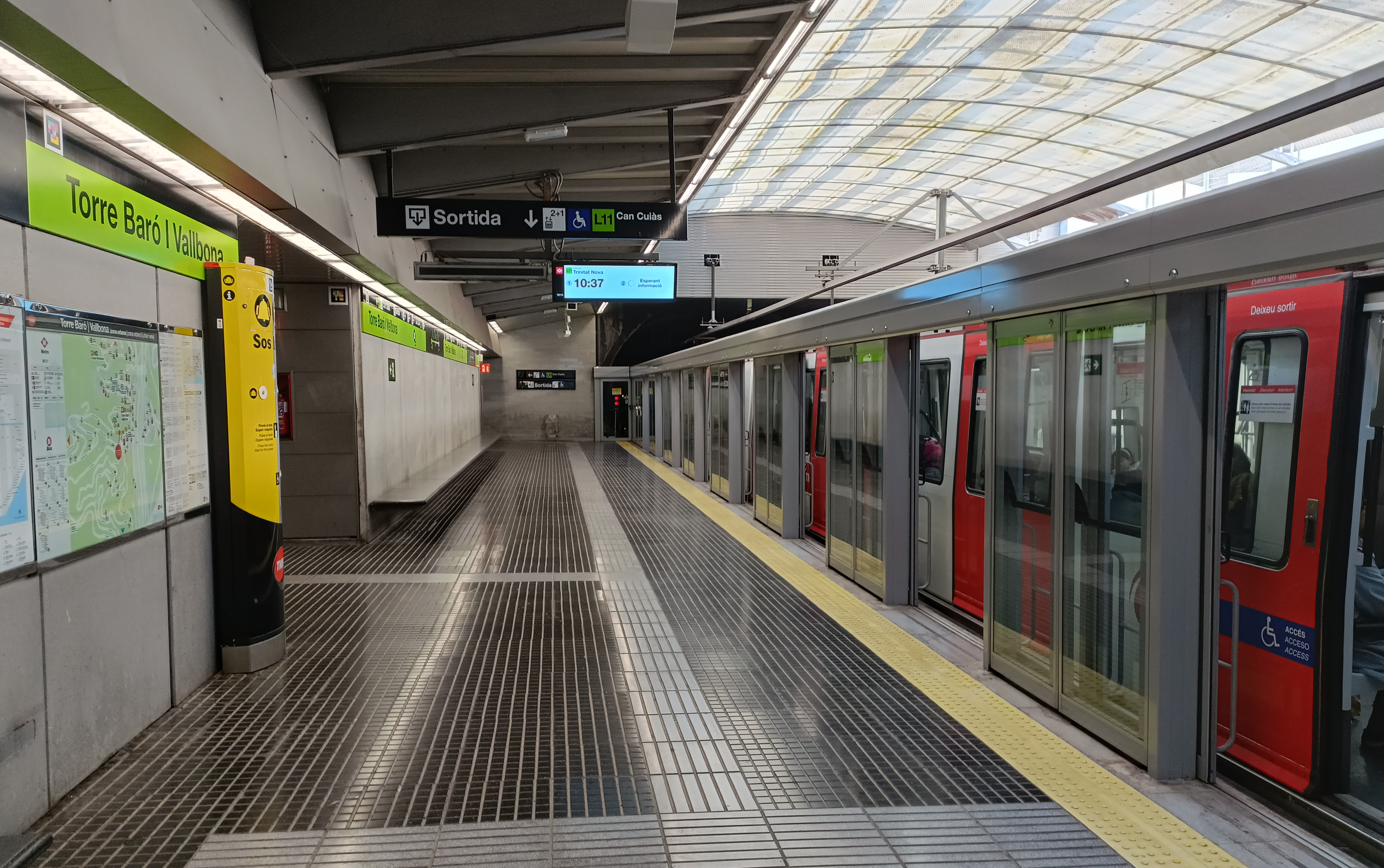
- Platform at Torre Baró-Vallbona station

General information
- Location: La Trinitat Nova, Nou Barris, Barcelona
- Coordinates: 41°27′30″N 2°10′48″E
- System: Barcelona Metro rapid transit station
- Owner: Transports Metropolitans de Barcelona
- Operator: Transports Metropolitans de Barcelona
- Platforms: 2 side platforms
- Tracks: 2
- Connections: Rodalies de Catalunya: R3, R4, R7, R12 (at Torre del Baró)

Construction
- Accessible: Disabled access

History
- Opened: December 14, 2003

Passengers
- 2024: 334,373

Services
Preceding station	Metro	Following station
Ciutat Meridiana towards Can Cuiàs	L11	Casa de l'Aigua towards Trinitat Nova
Location

Torre Baró | Vallbona (Catalan pronunciation: [ˈtorə βəˈɾo ˌβaʎˈβɔnə]) is a station on Line 11 of the Barcelona Metro. It is located in the neighborhood of Torre Baró, in the Nou Barris district of Barcelona. Opened along the rest of the line in 2003, the station is the halfway point of Line 11's 5 station route. The station provides a connection with the Rodalies de Catalunya station in Torre del Baró.

== Location ==
The station is named after the two neighborhoods of the Nou Barris district it serves. Torre Baró, in which the station is actually located and the nearby neighborhood of Vallbona, which is separated from the rest of the district by a major highway right of way. The station is located between the streets of Avinguda d'Escolapi Càncer and Carrer de Sant Feliu de Codines.

Torre Baró | Vallbona is the only station in Line 11 to not be completely underground, built in a trench with an opening above the tracks. While it used to be open to the elements, the station now features a skylight over the tracks that allows daylight to illuminate the platforms during the day.

The station has two accesses, a lower one at Avinguda d'Escolapi Càncer and an upper one at Carrer de Sant Feliu de Codines. The lower access is closer to the Torre del Baró station access in Avinguda de Vallbona.

== History ==
Torre Baró | Vallbona was opened on December 14, 2003, like the rest of Line 11. Unlike others on the line, the station features two tracks and 2 platforms. As the halfway point of Line 11's 5 station route, Torre Baró | Vallbona is used as a passing loop, with trains traveling in opposite directions passing each other at the station.

In 2008, platform screen doors were installed on the station's platforms to allow for automated operation, which would begin in 2009. It was also at this time that a skylight was installed on the opening over the tracks.

In 2024, Torre Baró | Vallbona was the 7th least used station in the Barcelona Metro network according to official TMB data, with 334,373 passengers.

== Gallery ==
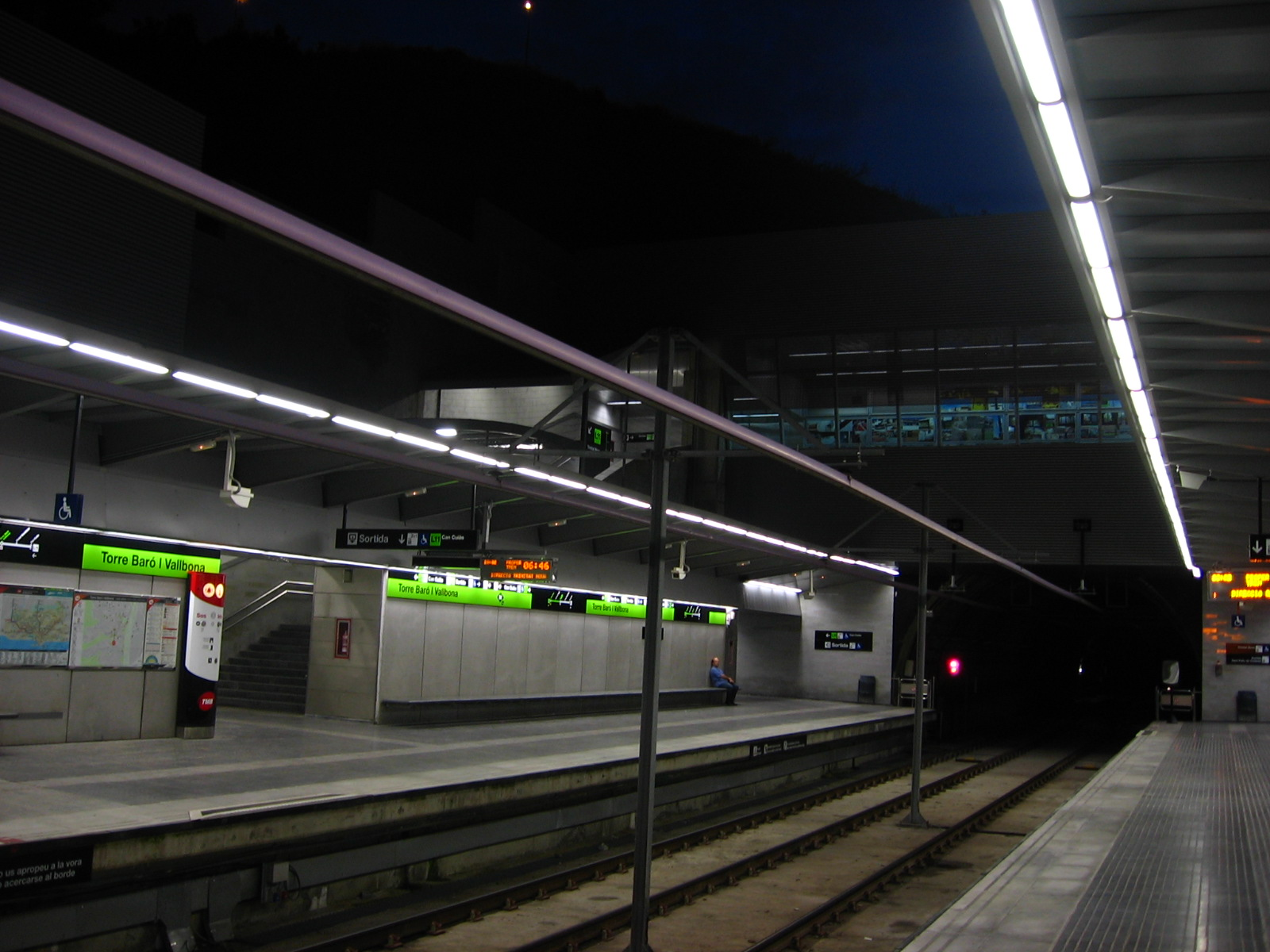
The station's platforms at night, before platform screen doors and the skylight were installed

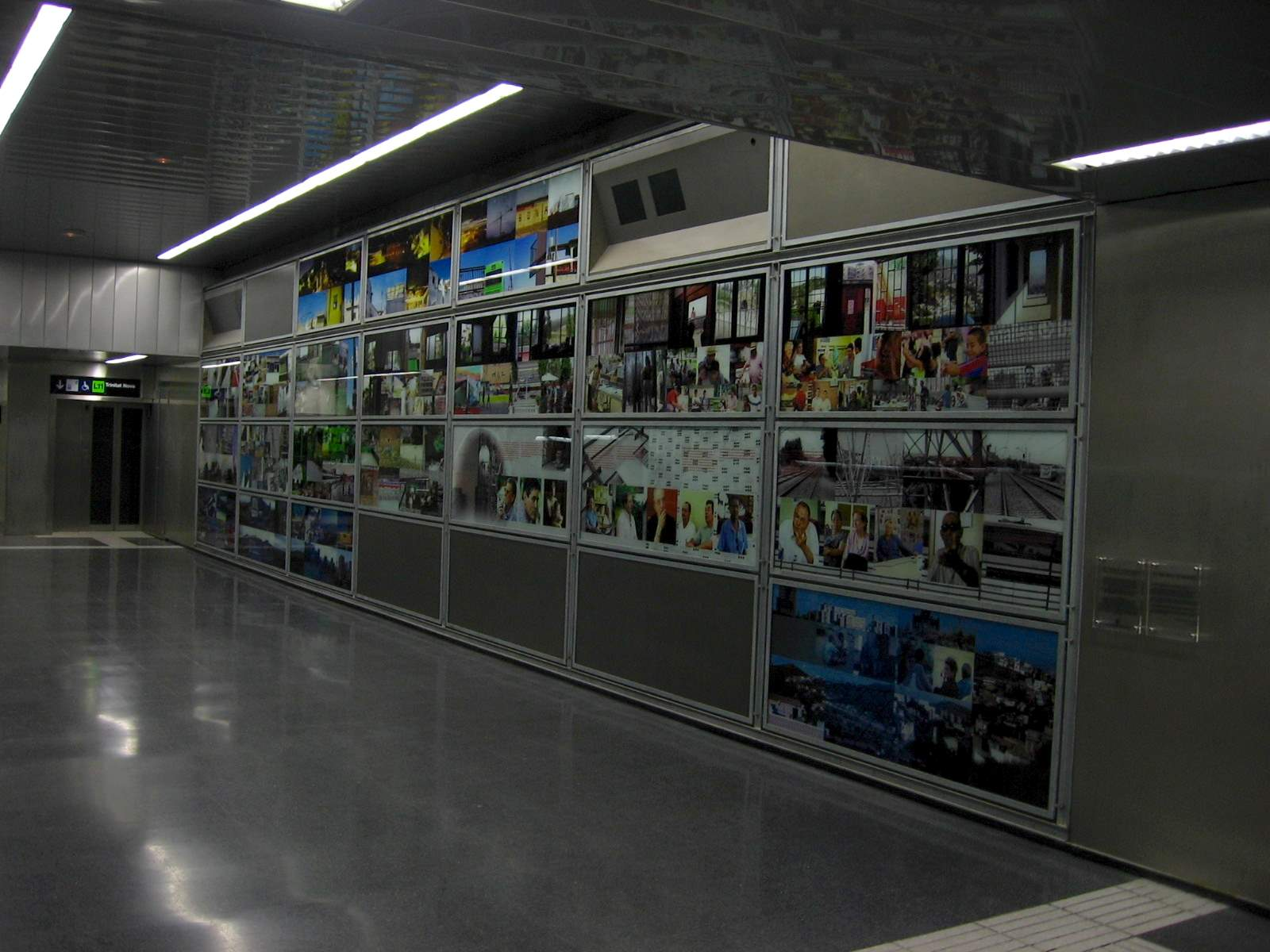
Original appearance of the station in 2005

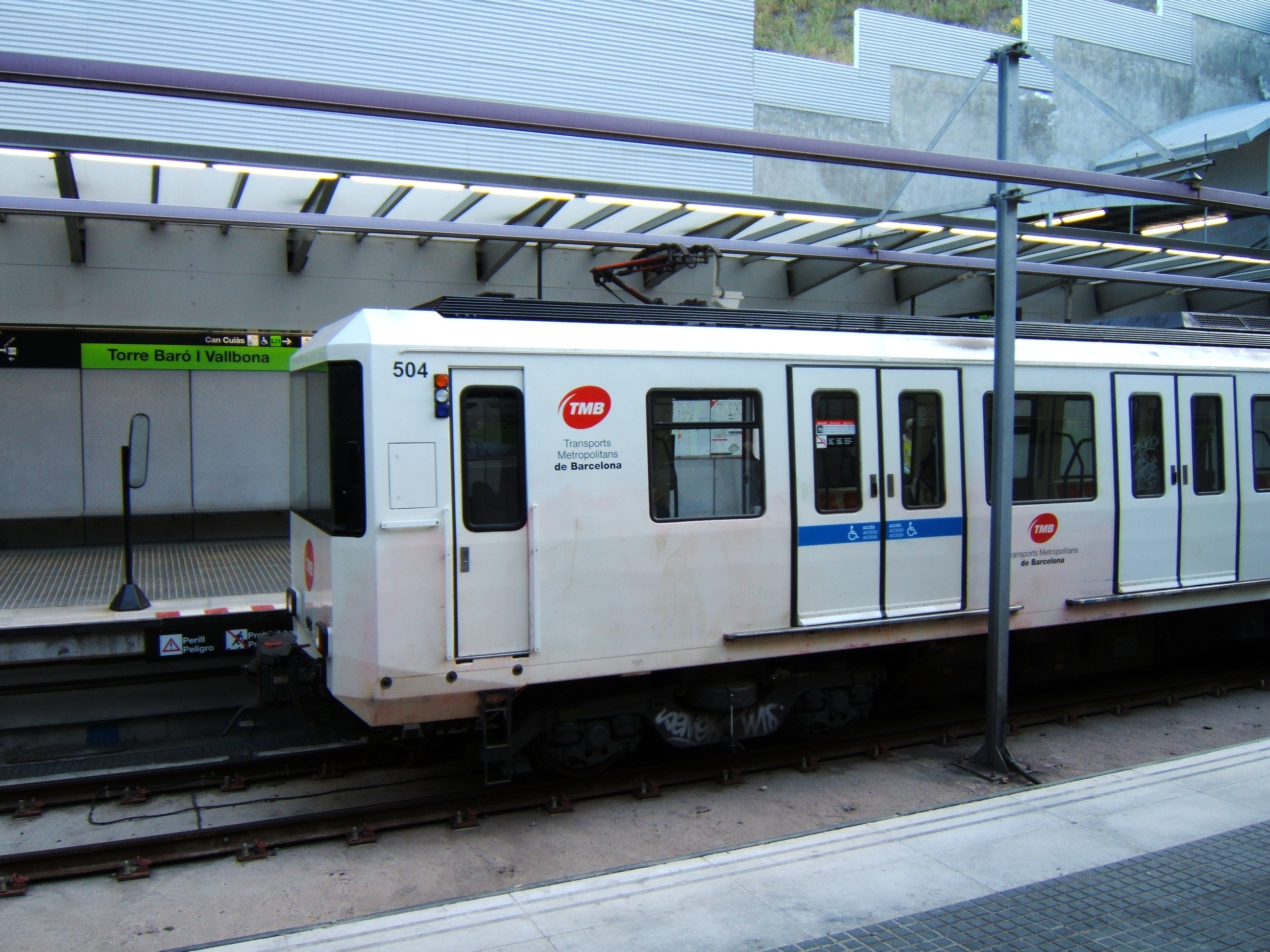
A Line 11 train at the station in 2006

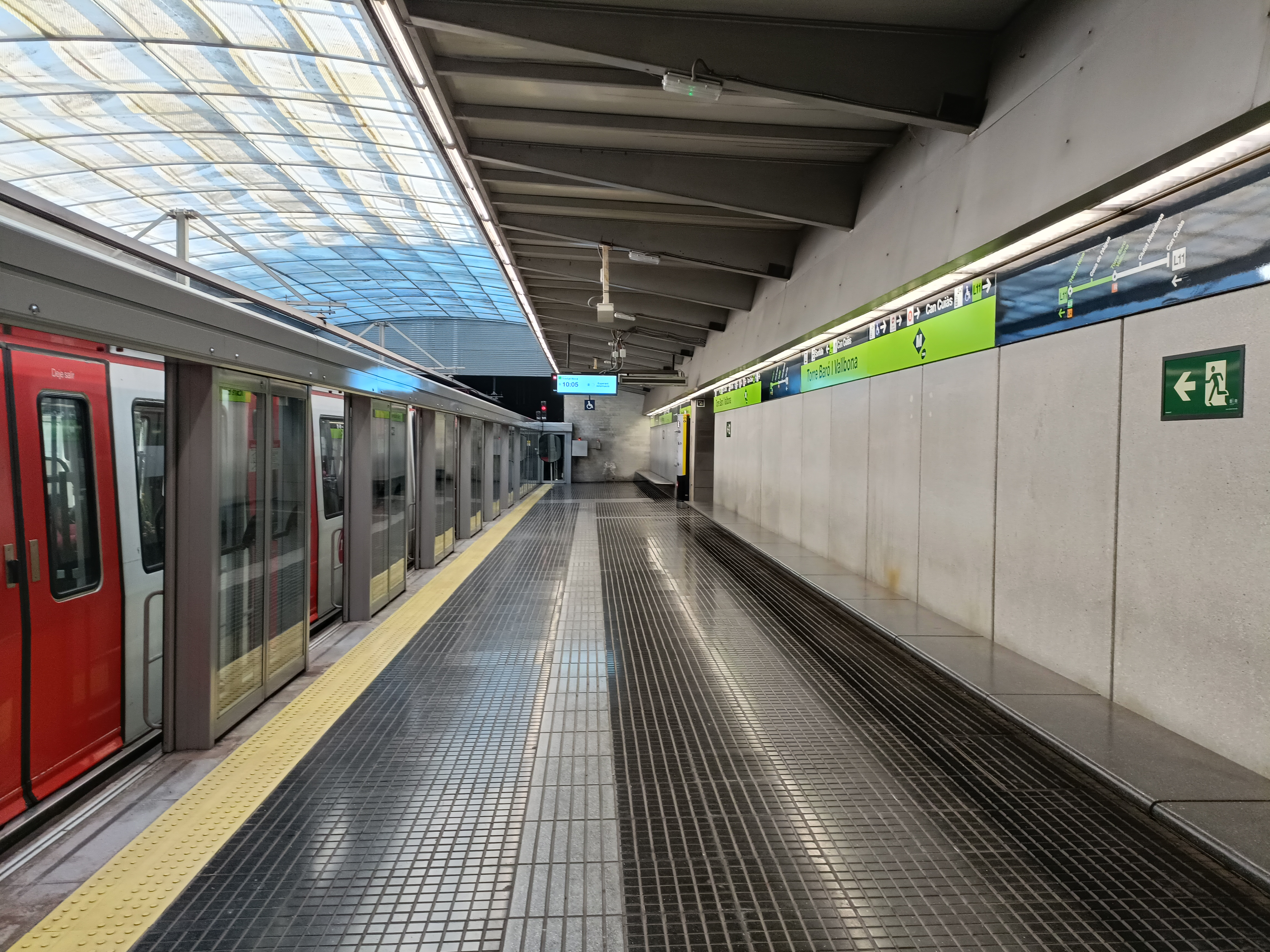
One of the station's platforms in 2025, with the platform screen doors and the skylight visible

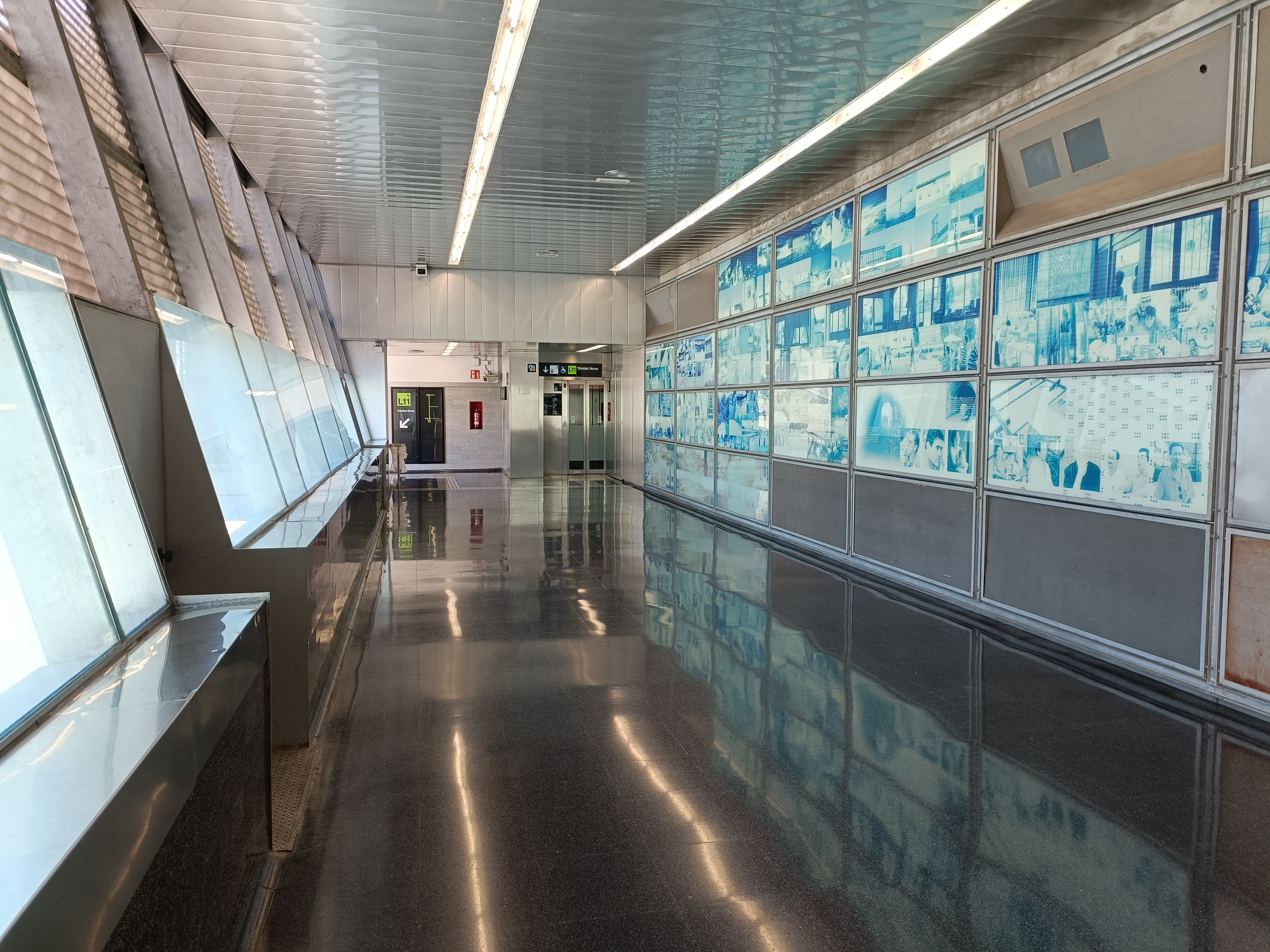
The corridor connecting the station's platforms in 2025

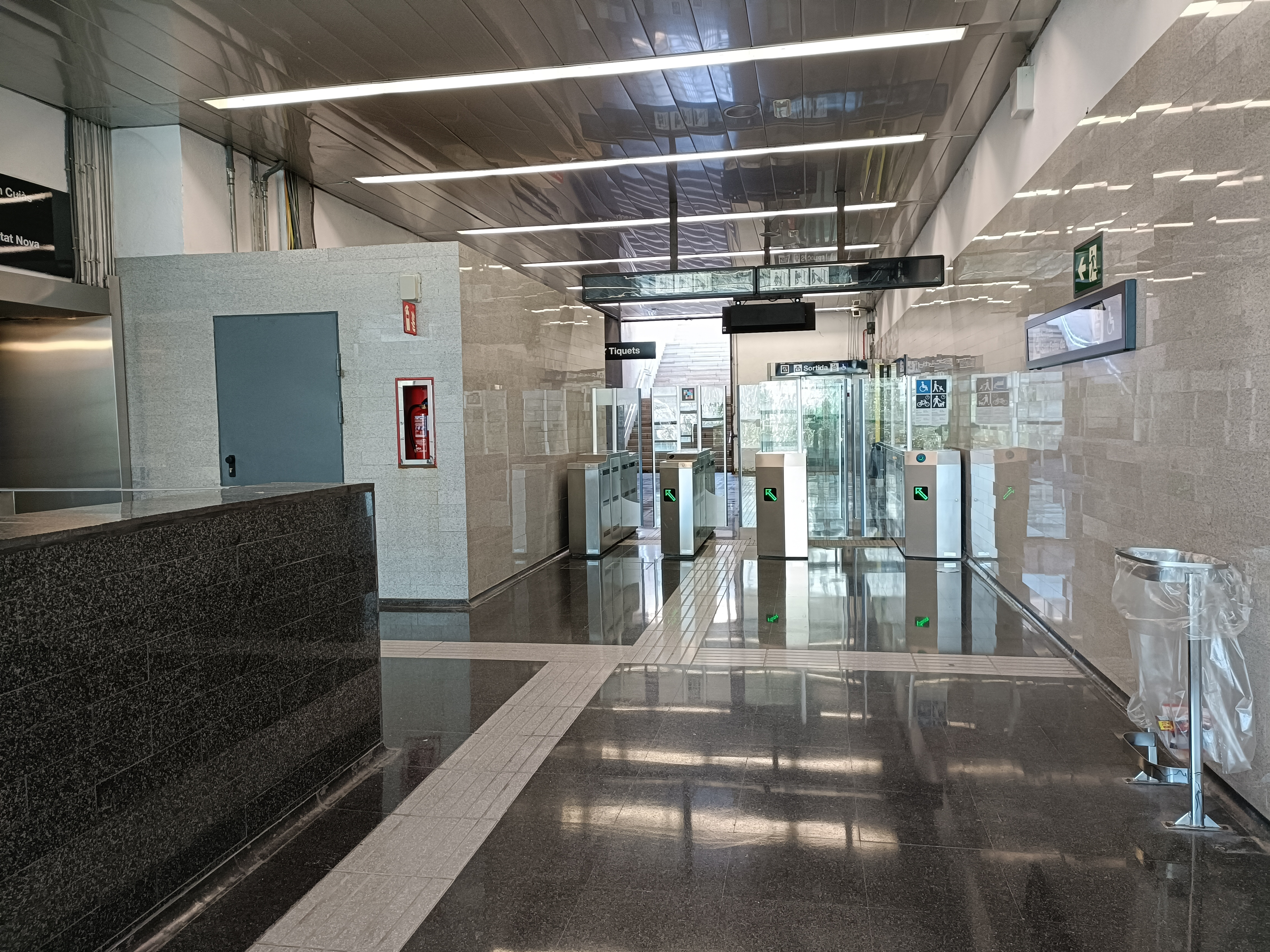
The station's fare gates in the upper access

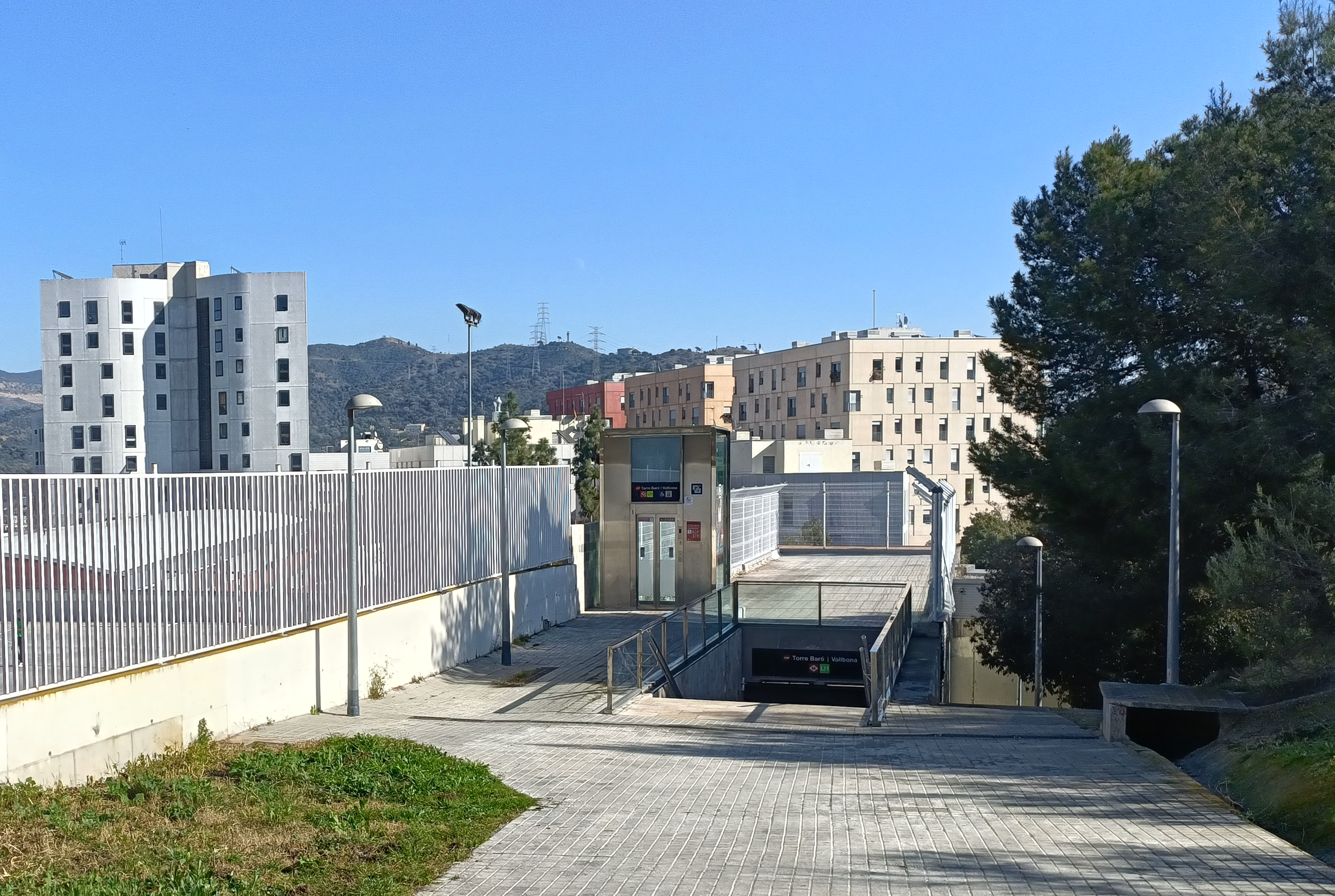
The upper access at Carrer de Sant Feliu de Codines

== See also ==
- Torre del Baró railway station
- List of Barcelona Metro stations
- Barcelona Metro line 11
