= Ciutat Meridiana =

Coordinates: 41°27′39.29″N 2°10′27.96″E

- Neighborhood of Barcelona
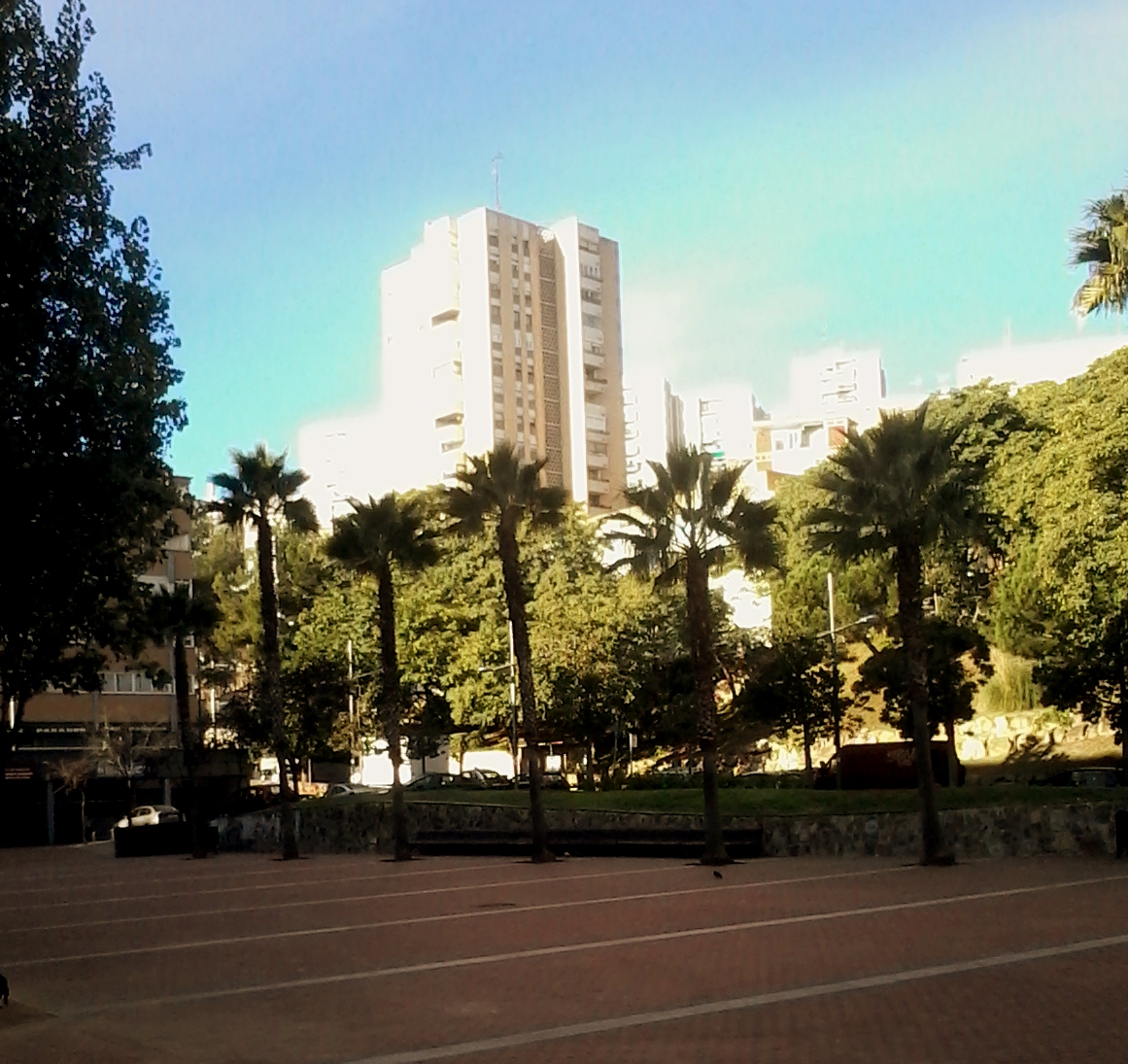
- Plaça Roja
- Interactive map of Ciutat Meridiana
- Country: Spain
- Autonomous community: Catalonia
- Province: Barcelona
- Comarca: Barcelonès
- Municipality: Barcelona
- District: Nou Barris

Area
  - Total: 0.355 km^{2} (0.137 sq mi)

Population
  - Total: 10,055
  - Density: 28,300/km^{2} (73,400/sq mi)

Ciutat Meridiana (Catalan pronunciation: [siwˈtad məɾiðiˈanə]) is a neighborhood in the Nou Barris district of Barcelona, Catalonia (Spain).

== Transport ==
Ciutat Meridiana station on Metro Line 11 is located in the neighbourhood, the station opened in 2003 along with the rest of the line which connects with line 3 and line 4 at Trinitat Nova station, there are also connections to Rodalies de Catalunya mainline trains at Torre Baró-Vallbona station. Metro services are provided by Transports Metropolitans de Barcelona
