= Casa de l'Aigua station =

Metro station in Barcelona, Spain

Casa de l'Aigua
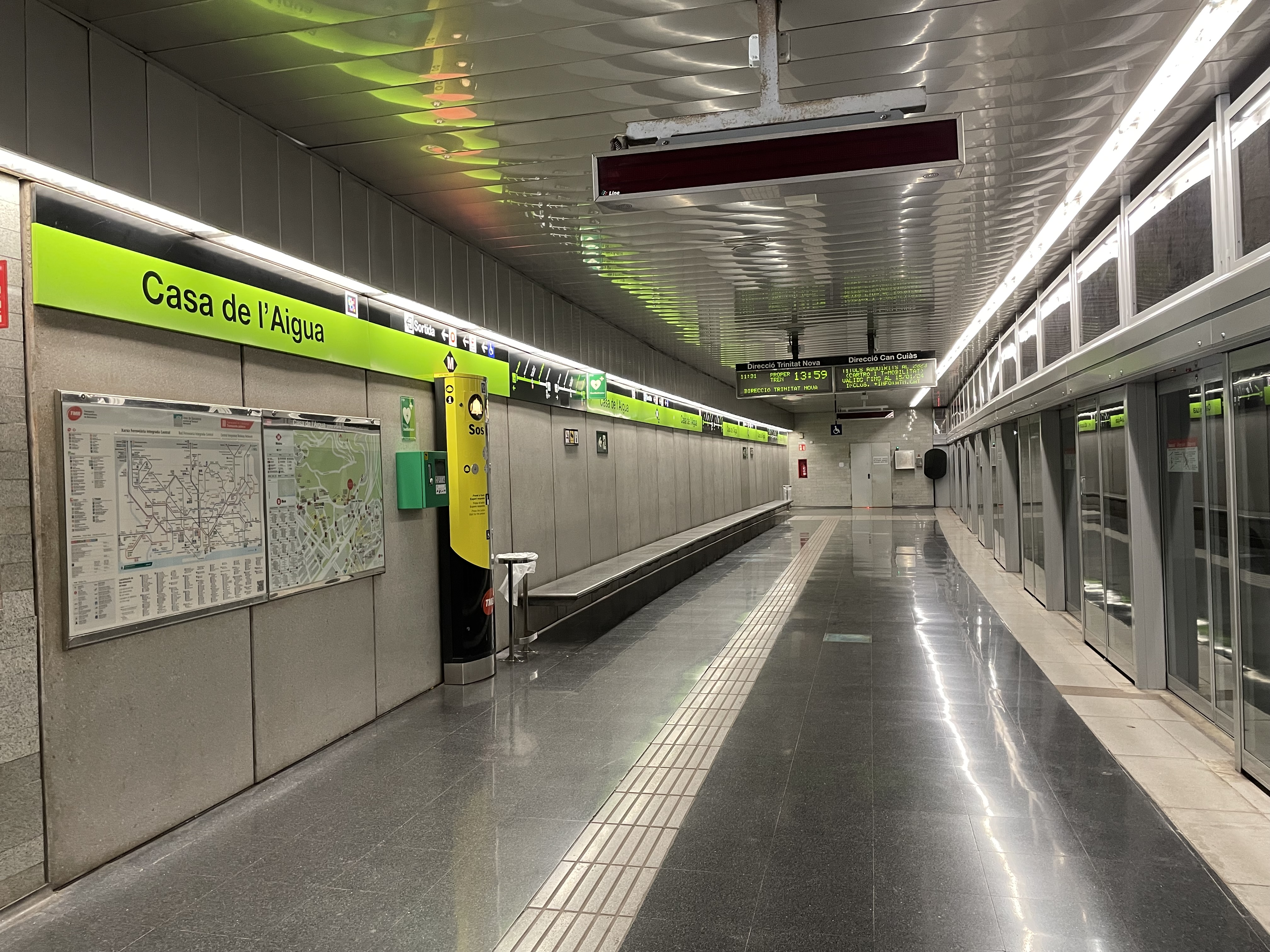
- Platform at Casa de l'Aigua station

General information
- Location: La Trinitat Nova, Nou Barris, Barcelona
- Coordinates: 41°27′10″N 2°11′10″E
- System: Barcelona Metro rapid transit station
- Owner: Transports Metropolitans de Barcelona
- Operator: Transports Metropolitans de Barcelona
- Platforms: 1
- Tracks: 1

Construction
- Structure type: Underground
- Accessible: Disabled access

History
- Opened: December 14, 2003

Passengers
- 2024: 46.884

Services
Preceding station	Metro	Following station
Torre Baró | Vallbona towards Can Cuiàs	L11	Trinitat Nova Terminus
Location

Casa de l'Aigua (Catalan pronunciation: [ˈkazə ðə ˈlajɣwə]) is a station on Line 11 of the Barcelona Metro. It is located in the neighborhood of la Trinitat Nova, in the Nou Barris district of Barcelona. Opened along the rest of the line in 2003, the station is located only about 300 meters away from the line's terminus in Trinitat Nova. In 2024, it was the least used station in the whole Barcelona Metro network.

== Location ==
The station is named after the nearby Casa de l'Aigua complex, a former water pumping station now preserved as an industrial heritage site. The station is underground, beneath Pas d'Antonio Cuadrillero on the foothills of the Collserola mountain range that overlooks la Trinitat Nova neighborhood in Nou Barris. The station is a mere 300 meters away from the Line 11 terminus at Trinitat Nova, with the underground depot shared by Line 4 and Line 11 sitting between them.

The station has a single, step-free, street-level access in Carrer de Vila-real, just above Carrer d'Aiguablava.

== History ==
The station was opened on December 14, 2003, like the rest of Line 11. It was built with only one track and one platform, which is used by trains travelling in both directions. In 2008, platform screen doors were installed on the station's platforms to allow for automated operation, which would begin in 2009. In 2024, Casa de l'Aigua was the least used station in the Barcelona Metro network according to official TMB data, with 46,884 passengers. TMB CEO Xavier Flores pointed to the station's proximity to Trinitat Nova to explain Casa de l'Aigua's low passenger volume.

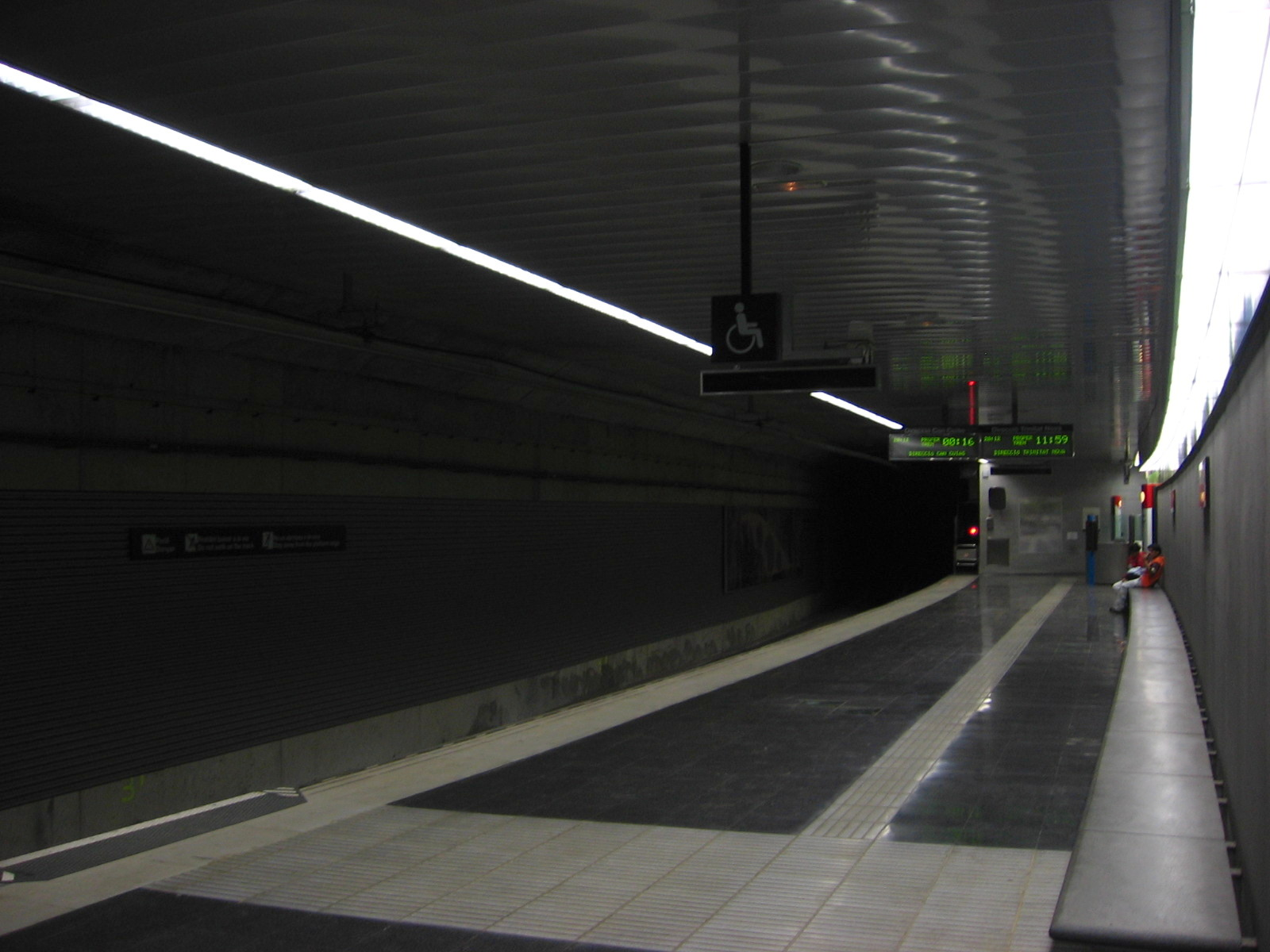
The station's platform before platform screen doors were installed

== See also ==
- List of Barcelona Metro stations
