= Pavel Anisimov =

Pavel Anisimov may refer to:

- Pavel Anisimov (chess player)
- Pavel Anisimov (politician)
