= Torre del Baró railway station =

Railway station in Barcelona, Spain

Coordinates: 41°27′42″N 2°10′49″E

Torre del Baró
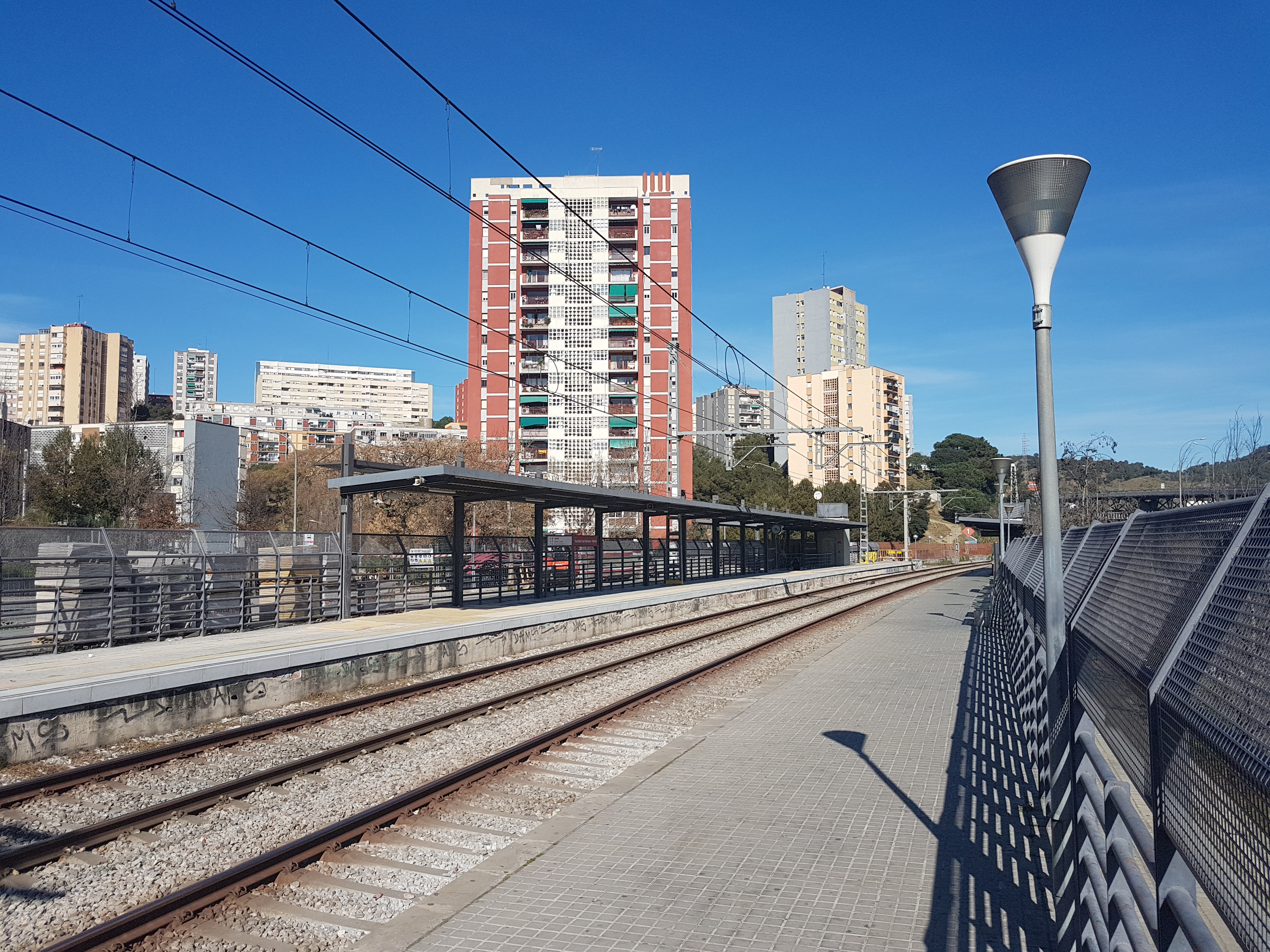
- The station in 2019

General information
- Location: Ciutat Meridiana, Barcelona; Catalonia; Spain
- System: Rodalies de Catalunya commuter and regional rail station
- Owner: Adif
- Operator: Renfe Operadora
- Line: Lleida–Manresa–Barcelona (PK 174.4)
- Platforms: 2 side platforms
- Tracks: 2
- Connections: Barcelona Metro line 11 at Torre Baró-Vallbona station; Urban buses

Construction
- Structure type: Underground
- Parking: A parking lot is located at each side of the station.

Other information
- Fare zone: 1 (ATM Àrea de Barcelona and Rodalies de Catalunya's Barcelona commuter rail service)

History
- Opened: 1970s

Services
Preceding station	Rodalies de Catalunya	Following station
Barcelona Sant Andreu Arenal towards L'Hospitalet de Llobregat	R3	Montcada Bifurcació towards Latour-de-Carol-Enveitg
Barcelona Sant Andreu Arenal towards Sant Vicenç de Calders	R4	Montcada Bifurcació towards Manresa
Barcelona Sant Andreu Arenal Terminus	R7	Montcada Bifurcació towards Cerdanyola Universitat
Barcelona Sant Andreu Arenal towards L'Hospitalet de Llobregat	R12	Montcada Bifurcació towards Lleida Pirineus
Location

Torre del Baró is a Rodalies de Catalunya station in the Nou Barris district of Barcelona in Catalonia, Spain. It was opened in the 1970s and, since 2003, interconnected with the Barcelona Metro station Torre Baró-Vallbona. It is served by Barcelona commuter rail lines R3, R4 and R7 as well as regional line R12.

== Other public transportation ==
- Barcelona Metro: L11 at Torre Baró
- TMB bus: 51, 62, 76, 83, 96, 97, 104

== See also ==
- List of railway stations in Barcelona
- List of Rodalies Barcelona railway stations
