= Saptarshi Roy =

Indian chess grandmaster (born 1986)

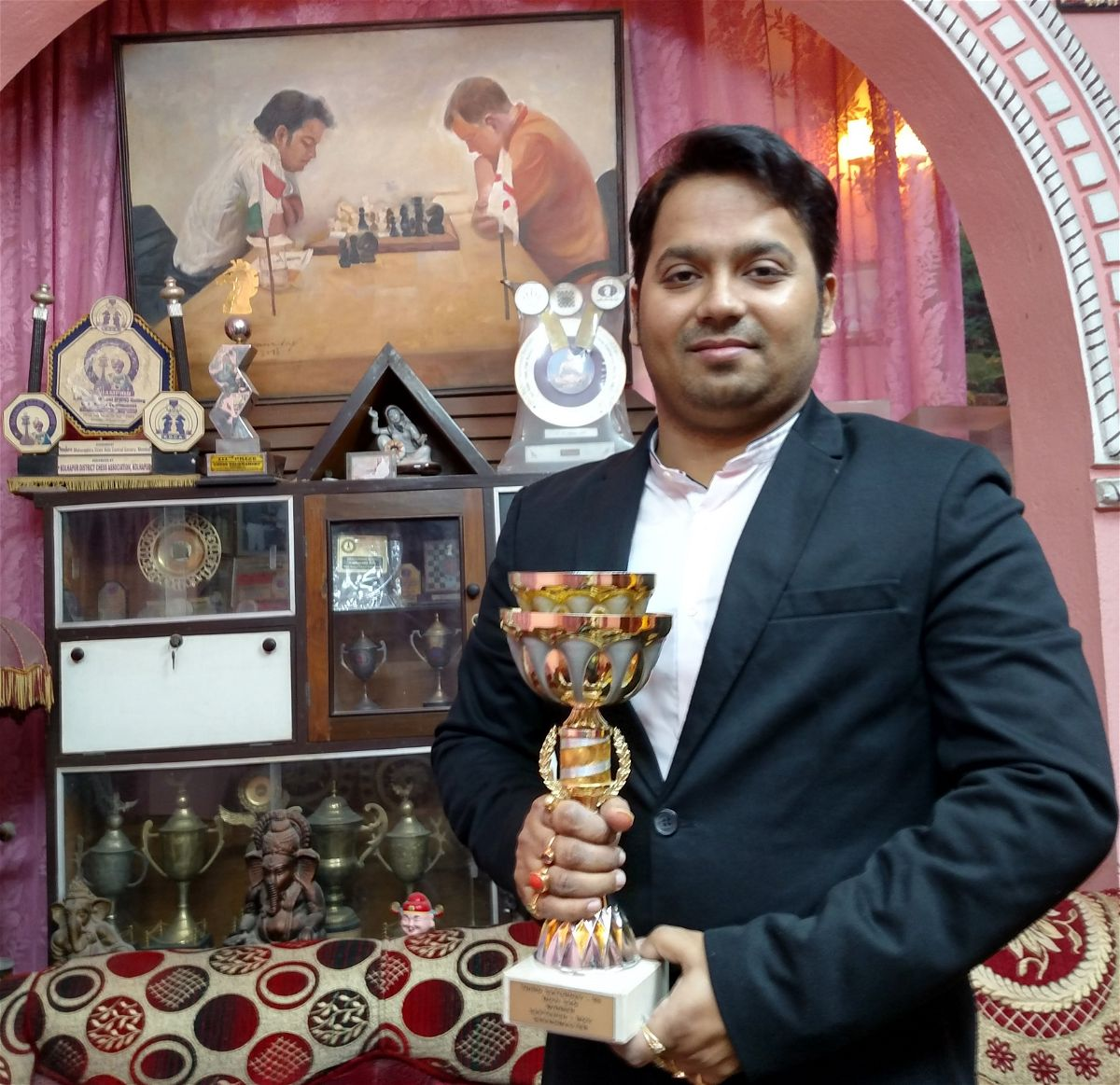

Personal information
- Born: 21 March 1986 (age 40) Kolkata, India

Chess career
- Country: India
- Title: Grandmaster (2018)
- Peak rating: 2500 (February 2018)

Saptarshi Roy (born 21 March 1986) is an Indian chess player, and India's 51st grandmaster.

== Education ==
He is a Graduate with a Bachelor of Science from Calcutta University in Kolkata.

== Biography ==
Saptarshi Roy was the 51st Grandmaster of India and earned the title in April, 2018.

He is the Son of Sri Amal Kumar Roy and Sri Supta Roy. He won the West Bengal state championship from 1994 to 2008.

As a chess trainer, he has also trained various IM's and GM's.

He facilitated a strategic training session, "King Hunts by GM Saptarshi Roy" in partnership with ChessBase India.

== Chess career ==
International Master Title Spain Montcada 2006 National U-12 Champion 1998 A.P.

Join 3rd World youth Championship 1998 Paris, France.

National U-15 Champion 1999 Kerala.

Champion In Nepal International open 2010.
Got 1st Grand Master Norm in Sant Marti Spain 2012

Got 2nd Grand Master Norm in Bangkok Open 2013.
Got his final Grand Master norm and Became the 51st GM of Indian History.
