= Barcelona Metro line 11 =

Rapid transit line in Barcelona, Spain

Coordinates: 41.4632°N 2.17181°E

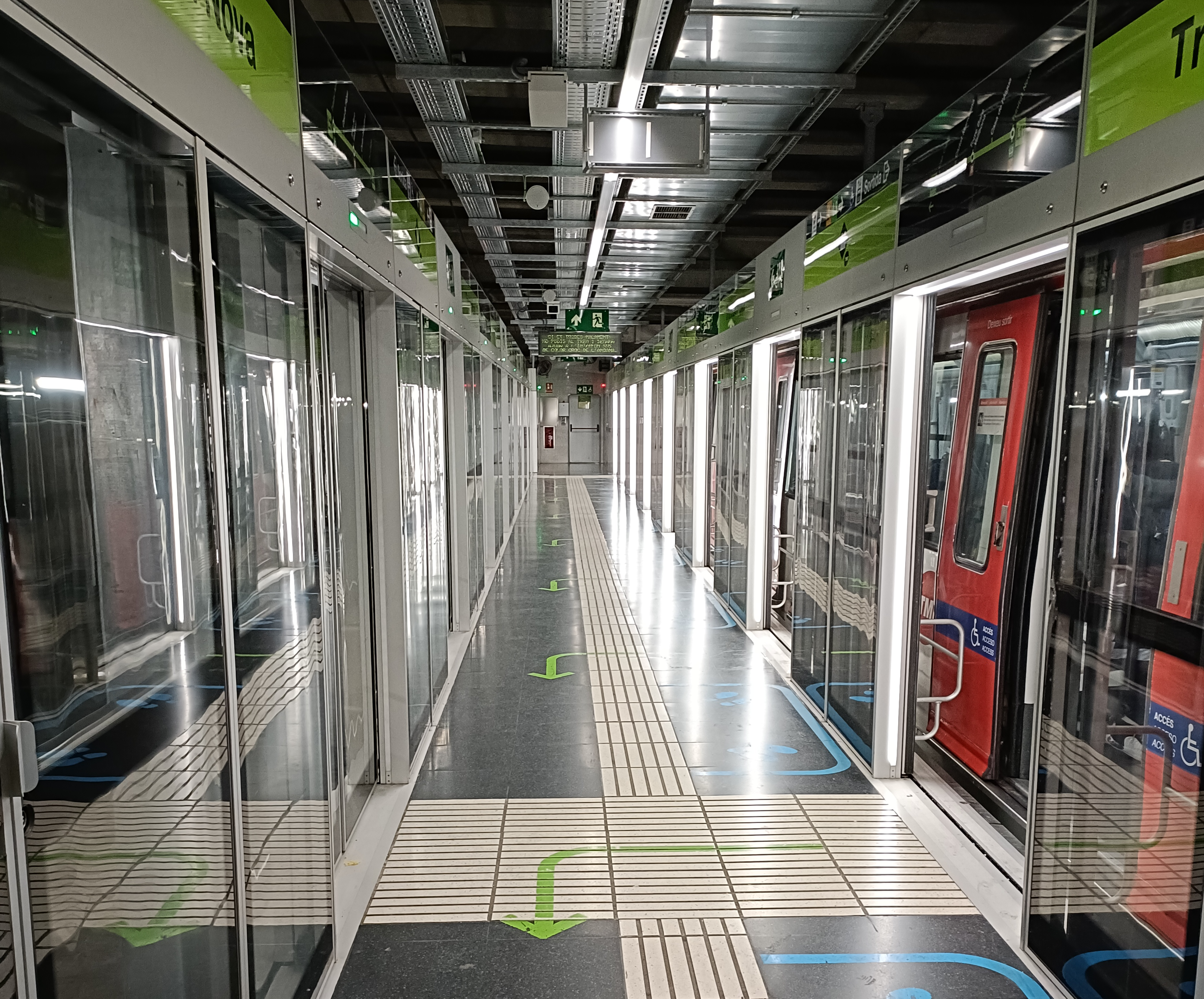
- Platform screen doors at Trinitat Nova

Overview
- Service type: Automated light metro
- Locale: Barcelona
- Current operator: TMB

Route
- Termini: Trinitat Nova; Can Cuiàs
- Stops: 5
- Distance travelled: 2.1 km (1.3 mi)
- Average journey time: 4 minutes

Technical
- Rolling stock: 500 series Trinitat Nova depot
- Track gauge: 1,435 mm (4 ft 8 1/2 in) standard gauge
- Electrification: 1,500 V DC rigid overhead wire
- Track owner: TMB

Barcelona Metro line 11 (Catalan pronunciation: [ˈlini.ə ˈonzə]) is a light metro line of the Barcelona Metro.

One of the newer lines on the network, Line 11 is operated by TMB and part of the ATM fare-integrated transport network in Barcelona. The 2.1 km line is automated, with platform screen doors and short, 2 car trains. With only 5 stations, Line 11 connects the terminus of Line 3 and Line 4 at Trinitat Nova to Can Cuiàs in Montcada i Reixac.

== Overview ==
Line 11 is one of the more recent additions to the main TMB network, having opened in 2003. It serves the hilly and dense northern corner of Barcelona, from La Trinitat Nova, where it links with Line 3 and Line 4, to Can Cuiàs. The line's short, automated trains provide rapid transit to the historically unconnected neighbourhoods of Torre Baró and Ciutat Meridiana, on the hills of the Nou Barris district. The terminus at Can Cuiàs is the only Barcelona Metro station in Montcada i Reixac.

The line's only connection besides those at Trinitat Nova is found at Torre Baró | Vallbona, with the Rodalies de Catalunya station Torre del Baró just a short walk away.

Most of the line is single-tracked, with a passing loop at Torre Baró | Vallbona, where trains have to wait to cross.

The colour assigned to this line by TMB is intended to represent a mixture of the official colours of Line 4. Additional metro lines projected to be built in following years will probably be quite similar to L11, and their colours have been designed using the same convention.

== History ==
The line was projected to provide Barcelona Metro coverage to the most remote neighbourhoods on the hills of Nou Barris, which have historically been isolated and had poor access to mass transit. The arrival of the metro had long been demanded by the neighbourhood associations in the area.

After an agreement to build the line between the Generalitat de Catalunya and neighbourhood associations was signed in 1999, construction started in 2001. While the line would be built to light metro standards, certain aspects were taken into account during planning to allow for future conversion to full heavy rail standards, such as reserved space for 400 meter long platforms in stations or maximum slopes of 4% grade.

The entire segment between Trinitat Nova and Can Cuiàs opened on December 14, 2003. While the line was conceived as an automated light metro extension of Line 4, it would only be in 2009 that platform screen doors were installed and automated operation began. This meant Line 11 became the second automated line of the Barcelona Metro, after Line 9. However, platform screen doors were initially not installed at Trinitat Nova, as the platform was shared with Line 4. This would change in 2021, as the station's platform was extended and the services on the two lines were finally separated, with a new area with platform screen doors for Line 11.

While several extensions towards Universitat Autònoma de Barcelona and Ripollet or the possibility of double-tracking the line have been proposed, there are currently no expansion plans for the line.

== Rolling stock ==
The rolling stock on Line 11 is the 500 series. While similar to the 2100 series on Line 4, its composition is unique in the network, as there are just three two-car trains running on the line.

== Stations ==
| Station | Image | Location | Opened | Interchanges |
|---|---|---|---|---|
| Trinitat Nova | | Barcelona (Nou Barris) | 14 December 2003 | Barcelona Metro Barcelona Metro line 3 Barcelona Metro line 4 |
| Casa de l'Aigua | | Barcelona (Nou Barris) | 14 December 2003 | |
| Torre Baró-Vallbona | | Barcelona (Nou Barris) | 14 December 2003 | (at Torre del Baró) |
| Ciutat Meridiana | | Barcelona (Nou Barris) | 14 December 2003 | |
| Can Cuiàs | | Montcada i Reixac (Can Cuiàs) | 14 December 2003 | |
