= Alexandre Danin =

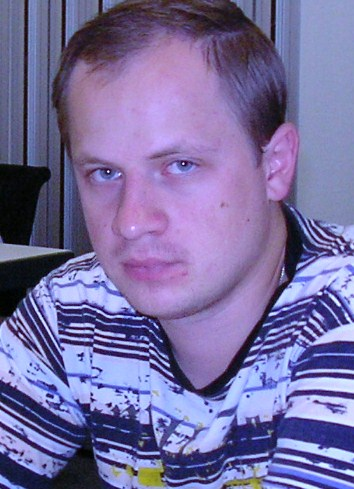
- Danin in 2011

Personal information
- Born: Alexandre Danin; March 14, 1986 (age 40) Bryansk, Russian SFSR, Soviet Union

Chess career
- Title: Grandmaster (2011)
- FIDE rating: 2525 (November 2026)
- Peak rating: 2606 (2015)

Alexandre Danin (Russian: Александр Данин; born 14 March 1986) is a Russian chess Grandmaster (GM). A competitive player in both domestic Russian tournaments and European open circuits, he achieved his career-peak classical FIDE rating of 2606 in 2015.

== Early life and youth achievements ==
Danin was born in Bryansk, Russian SFSR. He began playing chess as a child, advancing through regional and national junior championships in the late 1990s and early 2000s.

== Chess career ==
Born in Bryansk, Danin advanced through the Russian junior chess ranks during the late 1990s and early 2000s. He earned his International Master (IM) title from FIDE in 2004 after fulfilling the necessary rating and norm requirements.

Throughout the mid-to-late 2000s, Danin established himself as a prominent open tournament competitor. He routinely placed highly in regional European opens and national team qualifications. Following a series of strong international norm performances, FIDE officially ratified his Grandmaster title in 2011.

== Notable Performances and Style ==
Danin achieved his peak classical Elo rating of 2606 in 2015, crossing the 2600 threshold typically associated with elite tournament play. Over his career, he has recorded individual victories against high-level grandmasters, including an outstanding win against former Russian Champion Evgeny Alekseev (then rated 2688 Elo). He has also consistently competed in marquee events such as the European Individual Chess Championship and the Karlsruhe Neckar Open.

As a player, Danin is recognized for his dynamic theoretical preparation. Playing with the White pieces, he frequently employs the Scotch Game (particularly the Schmidt and Mieses variations) and the Exchange variations of the Grünfeld Defense. When handling the Black pieces, he is an active proponent of the French Defense (Classical and Steinitz variations) as well as the Taimanov and Scheveningen variations of the Sicilian Defense.

== Opening repertoire and playing style ==
Danin is recognized for maintaining a solid, classical repertoire with aggressive counter-attacking options: * **As White:** He relies heavily on $1.e4$ openings, primarily featuring the Scotch Game (notably the Schmidt and Mieses variations) and the Classical/Intermezzo line. Against $1...c5$, he frequently employs the Sicilian Defense Taimanov and Fischer-Sozin Attack lines. * **As Black:** Against $1.e4$, he favors the French Defense (Classical, Steinitz, and Boleslavsky variations) as well as the Sicilian Defense Taimanov. Against $1.d4$, he regularly plays the Grünfeld Defense (Modern Exchange Variation) and the King's Indian Defense.
