= Can Cuiàs station =

Metro station in Barcelona, Spain

Can Cuiàs
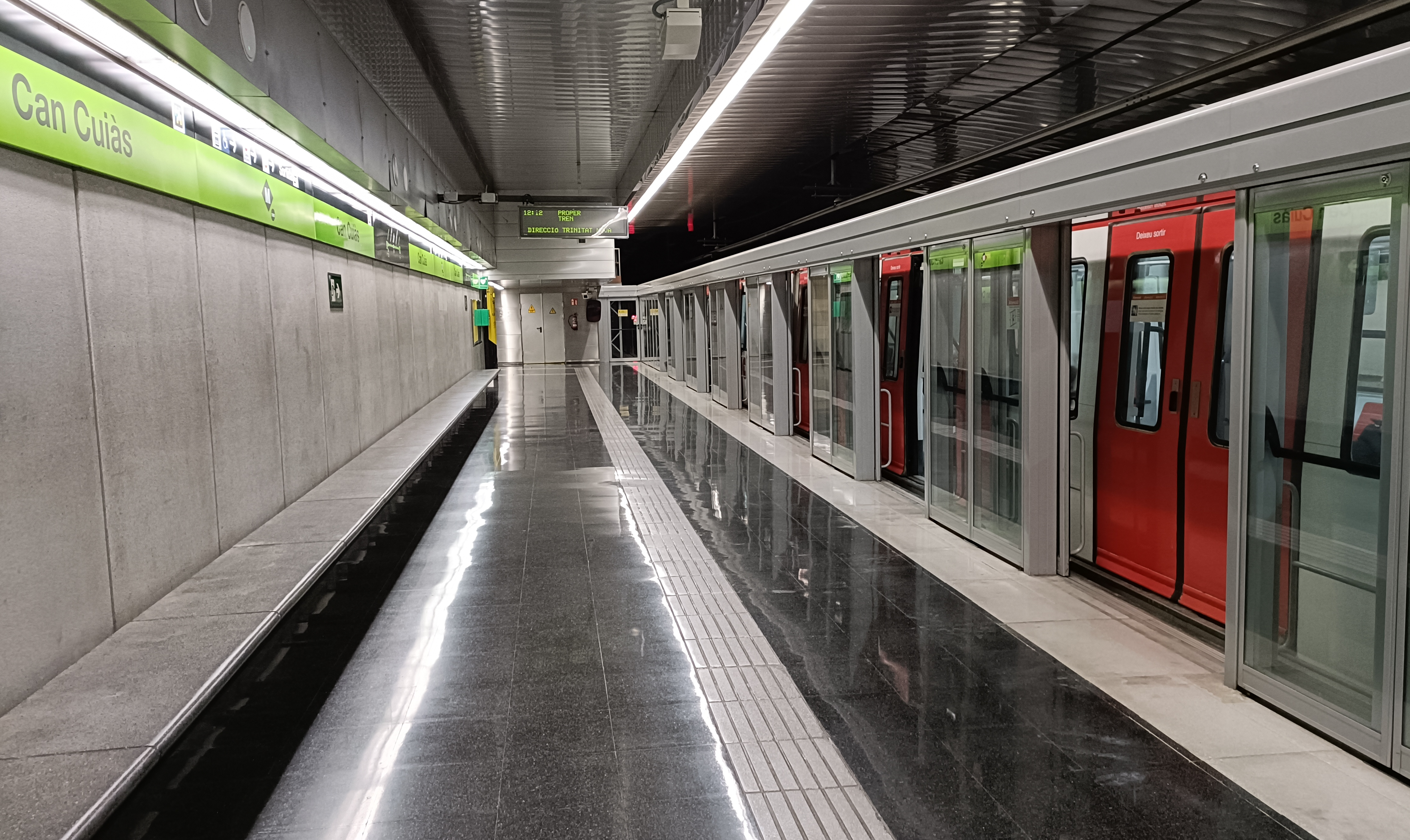

General information
- Location: Can Cuiàs, Montcada i Reixac
- Coordinates: 41.4632°N 2.17181°E
- System: Barcelona Metro rapid transit station
- Owner: Transports Metropolitans de Barcelona
- Operator: Transports Metropolitans de Barcelona
- Platforms: 2
- Tracks: 2

Construction
- Structure type: Underground
- Accessible: Disabled access

History
- Opened: December 14, 2003

Passengers
- 2024: 310,852

Services
Preceding station	Metro	Following station
Terminus	L11	Ciutat Meridiana towards Trinitat Nova
Location

Can Cuiàs (Catalan pronunciation: [ˈkaŋ kuˈjas]) is a station on Line 11 of the Barcelona Metro. It is located at the northern edge of the Nou Barris district of Barcelona, within the municipality of Montcada i Reixac. Opened along the rest of the line in 2003, it serves as the western terminus of Line 11. It is currently the only Barcelona Metro station in Montcada i Reixac.

== Location ==
The station is named after the Can Cuiàs neighbourhood of Montcada i Reixac, in which it is located. While the station is within the city limits of Montcada i Reixac, the city proper is behind the Turó de Montcada hill, leaving the Can Cuiàs neighbourhood isolated. Thus, the neighbourhood and industrial park of the same name are located on the hills next to several other neighbourhoods of the Nou Barris district of Barcelona, like Ciutat Meridiana and Torre Baró. The station has two accesses, one on Carrer de la Circumval·lació and another one on Carrer dels Tapissers.

== History ==
The station was opened on December 14, 2003, like the rest of Line 11. In 2008, platform screen doors were installed on the station's platforms to allow for automated operation, which would begin in 2009. In 2019, the station was used by TMB for a trial of vertical platform screen doors.

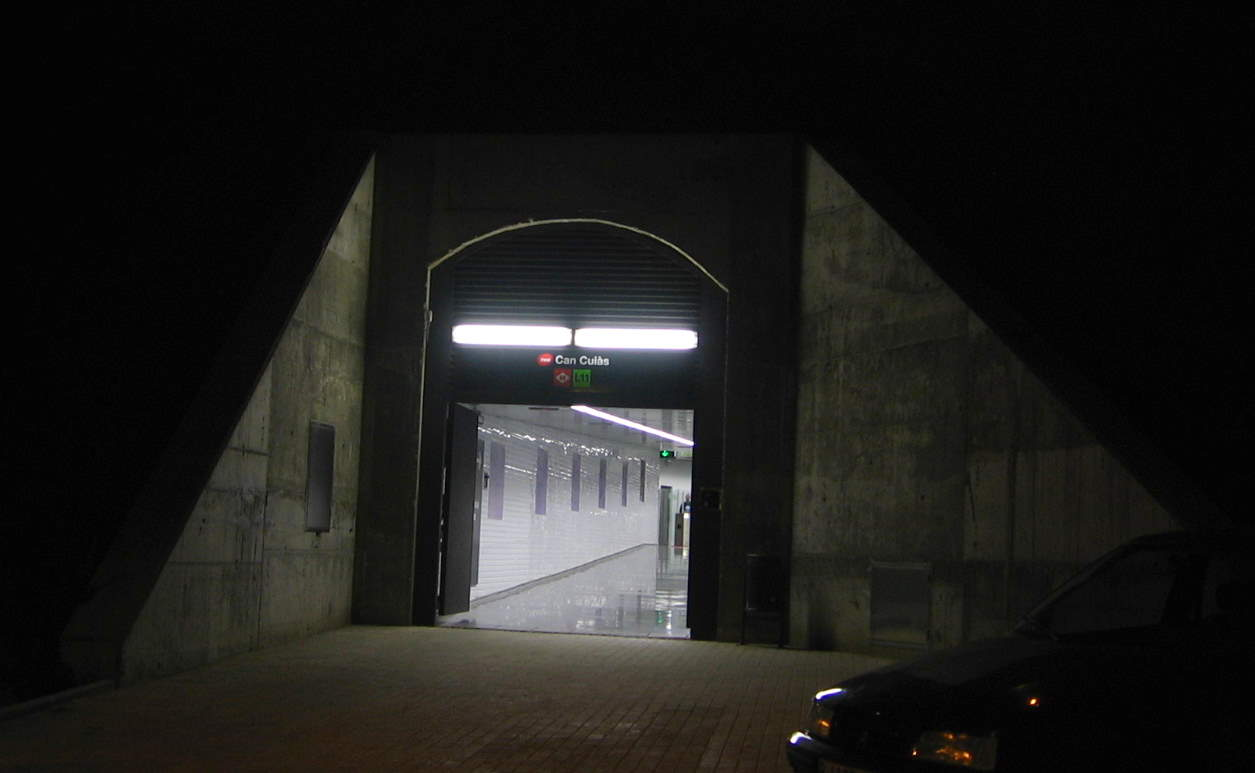
The station's entrance at Carrer dels Tapissers

== Passenger numbers ==
In 2024, it was the sixth least used station of the Barcelona Metro network, with 310,852 users.

== See also ==
- List of Barcelona Metro stations
- Transport in Montcada i Reixac
