= Gabriel Flom =

French chess grandmaster (born 1986)

Personal information
- Born: January 27, 1986 (age 40) Paris, France

Chess career
- Country: France
- Title: Grandmaster (2020)
- FIDE rating: 2458 (November 2026)
- Peak rating: 2515 (July 2018)

Gabriel Flom (né Battaglini) is a French chess grandmaster.

== Chess career ==
In August 2013, he finished in third place in the IM1 section of the 19th Maccabiah Games.

In February 2017, he won the B section of the Aeroflot Open.

In December 2022, he hosted a simultaneous exhibition at Elon University.

As of July 2023, he was teaching chess to summer camp children at recreation centers across Greensboro.
