= Montcada i Reixac =

- Municipality
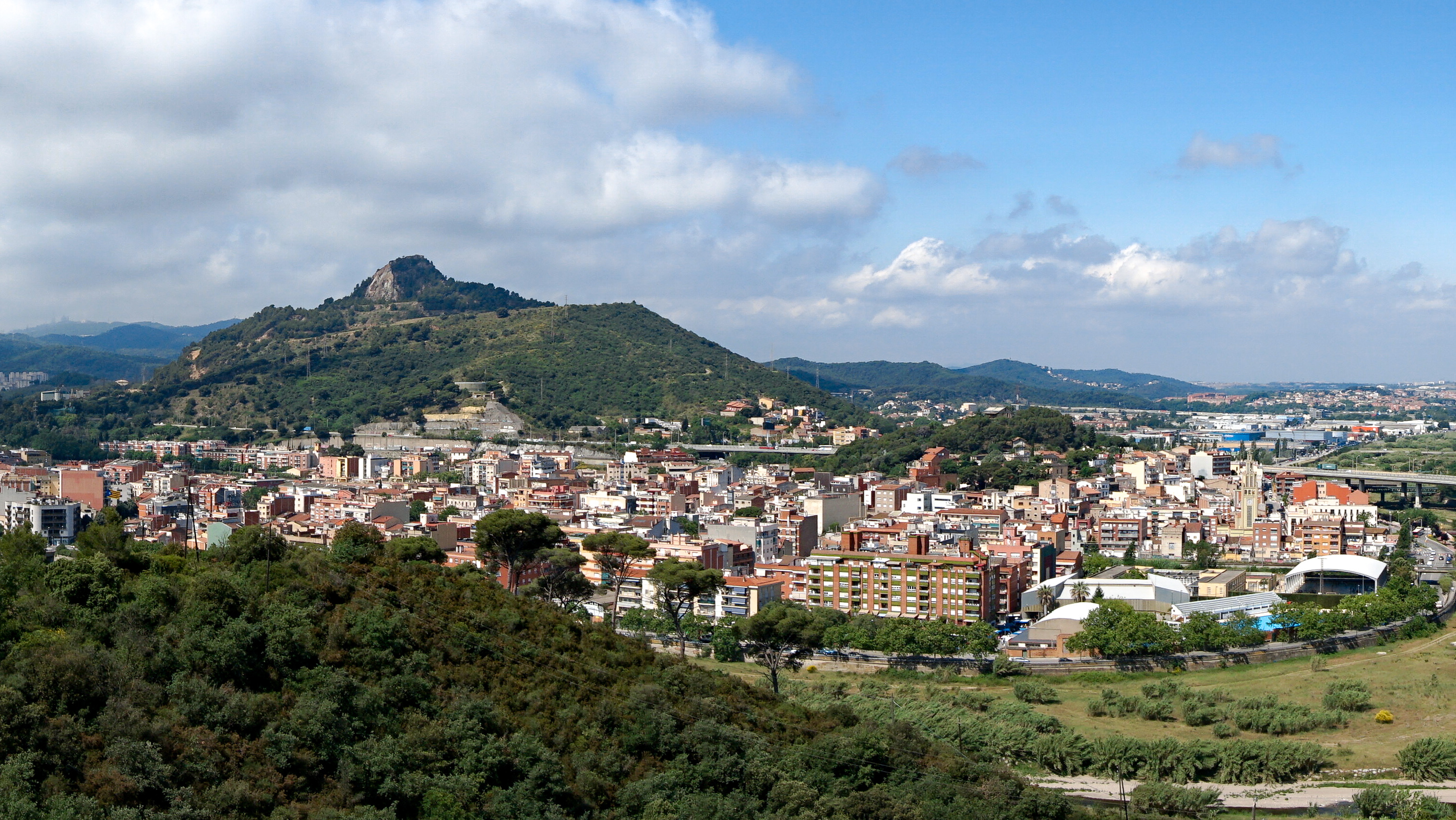
- Aerial view of Montcada i Reixac

- Flag Coat of arms

- Location in Catalonia Montcada i Reixac (Spain)
- Coordinates: 41°29′14″N 2°11′16″E
- Country: Spain
- Community: Catalonia
- Province: Barcelona
- Comarca: Vallès Occidental

Government
  - Mayor: Laura Campos Ferrer (2015)

Area
  - Total: 23.5 km^{2} (9.1 sq mi)
- Elevation: 36 m (118 ft)

Population (2025-01-01)
  - Total: 37,460
  - Density: 1,590/km^{2} (4,130/sq mi)
- Demonym(s): Montcadenc, montcadenca
- Postal code: 08110
- Website: montcada.cat

Montcada i Reixac (Catalan pronunciation: [muŋˈkaðəj rəˈʃak]), often referred to as simply Montcada, is a municipality in the comarca of the Vallès Occidental in Catalonia, Spain. It is situated at the confluence of the Ripoll river and the Besós river, and very close to the northernmost neighbourhoods of the city of Barcelona and is therefore a part of the metropolitan area of Barcelona. It had 33,656 inhabitants according to the 2010 census.

== Neighbourhoods ==
The following areas make up the urban tissue of Montcada: Can Cuiàs, Can Pomada, Can Sant Joan (Bifurcació), Carrerada (Montcada Nova), Font Pudenta, La Ribera (Valentine), Mas Duran, Mas Rampinyo, Montcada Centre, Pla d'en Coll, Terra Nostra (Santa Maria de Montcada) i Vallençana-Reixac. The municipality includes a small exclave to the north between Palau-solità i Plegamans and Mollet del Vallès.

== Transport ==
The town is served by the A-7 autopista, the N-152 road, six Renfe Rodalies Barcelona and regional railway stations used by several lines, and the terminus Barcelona Metro line 11, located at Can Cuiàs.

The GR 92 long distance footpath, which roughly follows the length of the Mediterranean coast of Spain, has a staging point at Montcada i Reixac. Stage 17 links northwards to Coll de la Font de Cera, a distance of 16.9 kilometres (10.5 mi), whilst stage 18 links southwards to Baixador de Vallvidrera station, a distance of 16.7 kilometres (10.4 mi).

== Notable people ==
- Elisenda de Montcada (c. 1292–1364), queen consort of Aragon (fourth wife of James II), noblewoman of the House of Montcada (which gives the town its name), and founder of the Royal Monastery of Santa Maria de Pedralbes (Note: Associated via the House of Montcada; birthplace sources indicate Aitona.)
- Joan Capella (1927–2005), painter and muralist
- Miquel Poblet (1928–2013), professional road cyclist considered the greatest in Catalan history, with 214 victories including two Milan–San Remo wins, two Volta a Catalunya wins, and stage wins in the Tour de France, Giro d'Italia, and Vuelta a España; first Spaniard to wear the yellow jersey in the Tour de France
- Serafín Marín (born 1944), professional bullfighter (torero) (or similar taurine site confirming birthplace)
- Carlos Cuevas (born 1995), actor known for roles in television series such as Merlí and El desorden que dejas
- Clàudia Pina (born 2001), professional footballer for FC Barcelona and the Spain national team
- La Pegatina, ska and rumba catalana band founded in 2003 in Montcada i Reixac, known for albums like Al Carrer! and international tours

== Twin towns ==
- Águilas, Spain
