= La Trinitat Nova =

Coordinates: 41°26′54.89″N 2°11′6.89″E

- Neighborhood of Barcelona
- Interactive map of La Trinitat Nova
- Country: Spain
- Autonomous community: Catalonia
- Province: Barcelona
- Comarca: Barcelonès
- Municipality: Barcelona
- District: Nou Barris

Area
  - Total: 0.56 km^{2} (0.22 sq mi)

Population
  - Total: 7,259
  - Density: 13,000/km^{2} (34,000/sq mi)

La Trinitat Nova (Catalan pronunciation: [lə tɾiniˈtad ˈnɔβə]) is a neighborhood in the Nou Barris district of Barcelona, Catalonia, Spain.

Trinitat Nova metro station, on lines L3, L4 and L11 of the Barcelona Metro, lies in the neighborhood.
