= Pavel Anisimov (chess player) =

Russian chess grandmaster (born 1986)

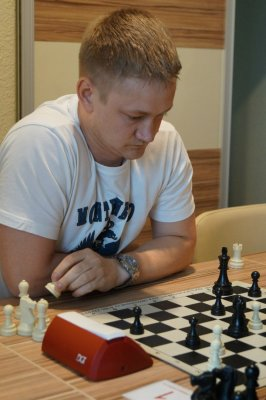

Personal information
- Born: April 19, 1986 (age 40) Leningrad, Russian SFSR, Soviet Union

Chess career
- Country: Russia (until 2023); Montenegro (since 2023)
- Title: Grandmaster (2019)
- FIDE rating: 2506 (July 2026)
- Peak rating: 2541 (July 2012)

Pavel Animisov (born April 19, 1986 in Leningrad, Russia) is a Russian chess Grandmaster (2019). His highest rating was 2541 (in July 2012). His current rating is 2506 (May 2026). He currently plays for Montenegro.

Champion of Russia among under 14 years old (2000). Olympic champion in the Russian national children team (2000). He took 1-4 place in the championship of Russia up to 16 years (2001).

He received the International master title in 2005.
