= Trinitat Nova station =

Metro station in Barcelona, Spain

Trinitat Nova
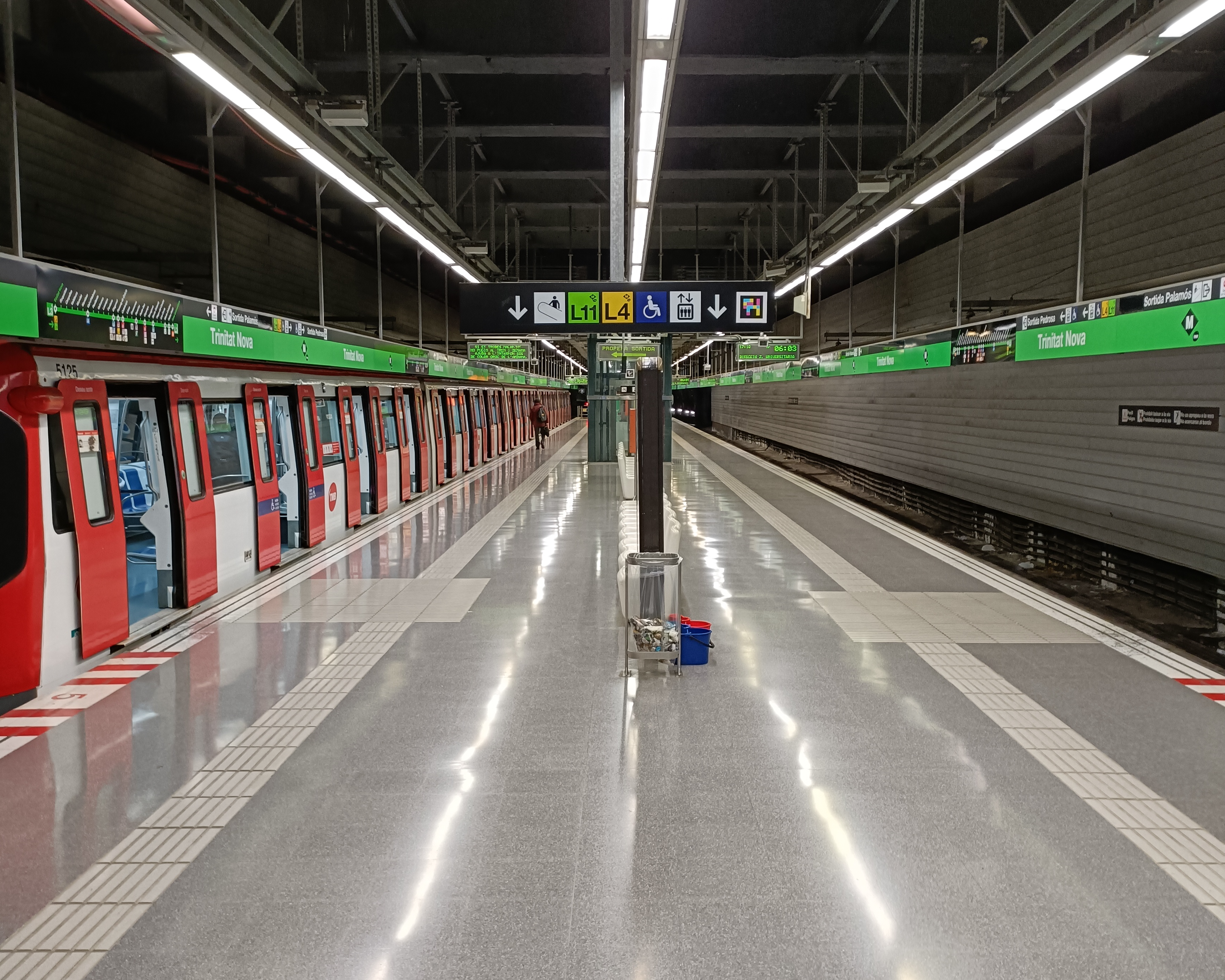
- The Line 3 platform

General information
- Location: Barcelona (Nou Barris)
- Coordinates: 41°26′56″N 2°10′57″E
- System: Barcelona Metro rapid transit station
- Owner: Transports Metropolitans de Barcelona
- Platforms: 3 island platforms
- Tracks: 6

Construction
- Structure type: Underground

Other information
- Fare zone: 1 (ATM)

History
- Opened: 1999; 27 years ago (Line 4); 2003; 23 years ago (Line 11); 2008; 18 years ago (Line 3)

Services
Preceding station	Metro	Following station
Roquetes towards Zona Universitària	L3	Terminus
Terminus	L4	Via Júlia towards La Pau
Casa de l'Aigua towards Can Cuiàs	L11	Terminus
Track layout
Location

Trinitat Nova (Catalan pronunciation: [tɾiniˈtad ˈnɔβə]) is a Barcelona Metro station, located in the Nou Barris district of the city of Barcelona. The station is served by Line 3, Line 4 and Line 11. The station is the current terminus of the three lines.

== Location ==
Trinitat Nova is located in La Trinitat Nova, the neighbourhood after which it is named. La Trinitat Nova is in the Nou Barris district of Barcelona. The station is located under the street-level at Carrer d'Aiguablava. With platforms at two different levels, the station has 3 different accesses at Carrer d'Aiguablava, Carrer de la Pedrosa and Carrer de Palamós. The Line 3 platform is at a much deeper level than the others, with several escalators and elevators connecting them. The station is located in front of the Mossos d'Esquadra police station of the district of Nou Barris.

== History ==
The first section of the station was opened in October 1999, with the extension of Line 4 from what is now Via Júlia station. Line L11 was opened in 2003, as a light metro extension to line L4, towards Can Cuiàs station and sharing line L4's platforms. Line L3 arrived at Trinitat Nova on 4 October 2008, with its own platforms.

Lines L4 and L11 used to share a single island platform, located underneath Carrer Aiguablava. Trains on line L4 would enter and leave from the south end of the platform and normally terminate on the eastern side of the platform, whilst trains on line L11 would enter and leave from the other end and terminate on the other side of the platform.

This would change after the station underwent renovations in the summer of 2021. The platform shared by Line 4 and Line 11 was extended to allow the separation of the two services. The existing platform is now used exclusively by Line 4 trains while the extended area of the platform, fitted with platform screen doors, became the new Line 11 platform. The renovations were completed in September 2021, with some travellers complaining about the narrowness of the new Line 11 platform and connection corridor.

== Gallery ==
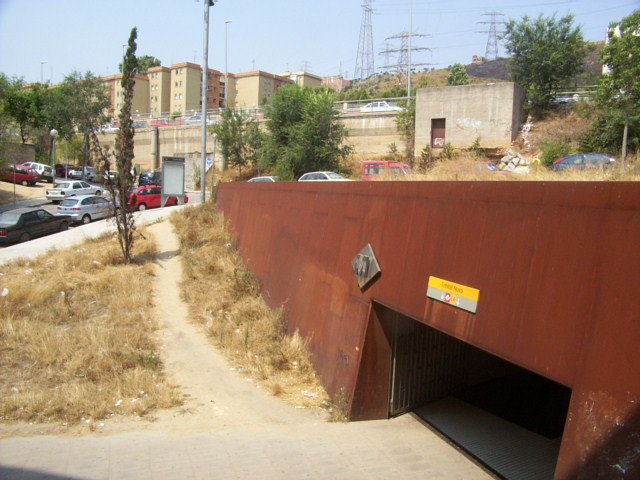
The station's entrance at Carrer de la Pedrosa, below platform level

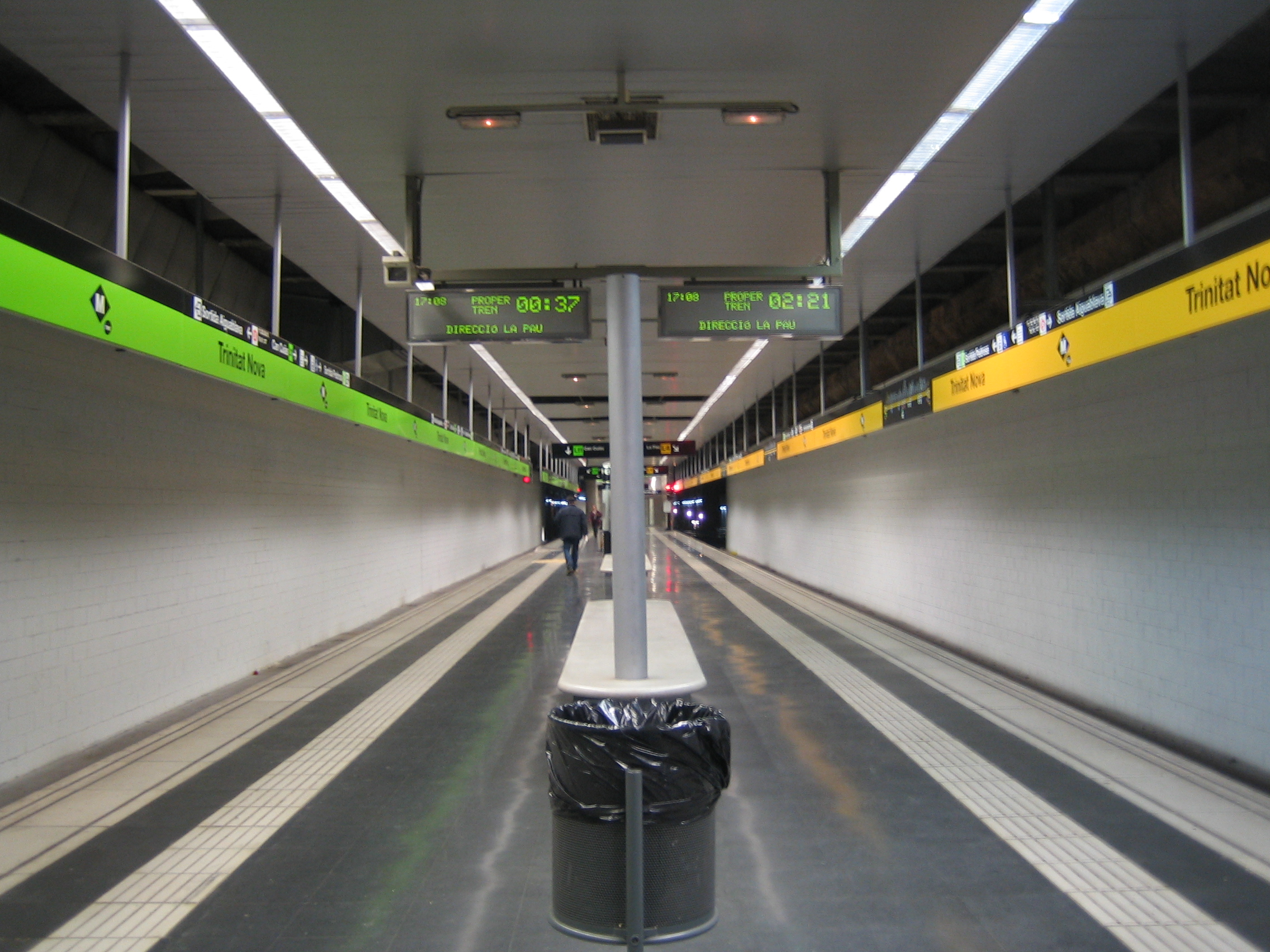
The station's appearance before 2021 with a single shared platform for Line 11 and Line 4

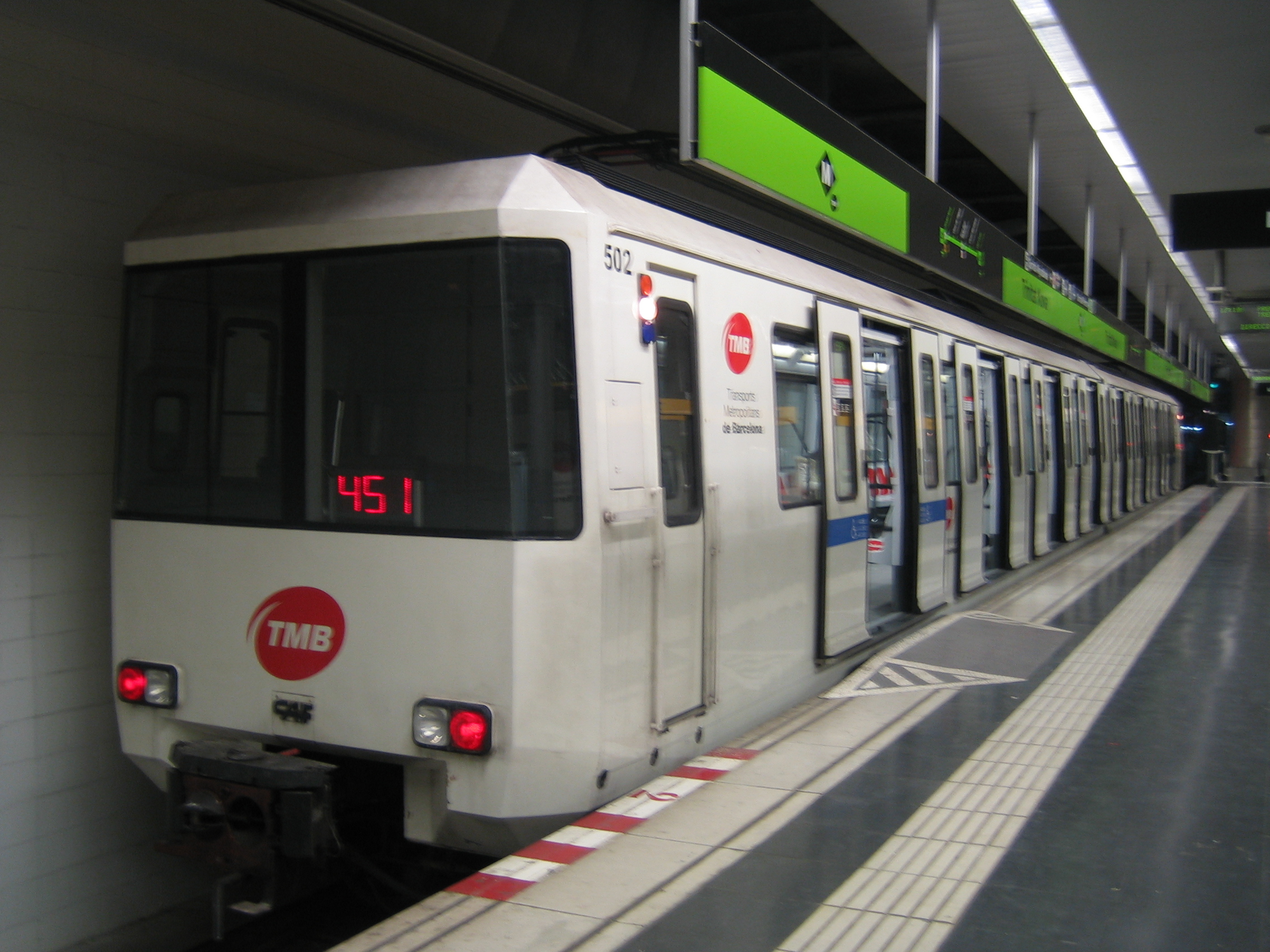
A Line 11 train at the former shared platform, before 2021

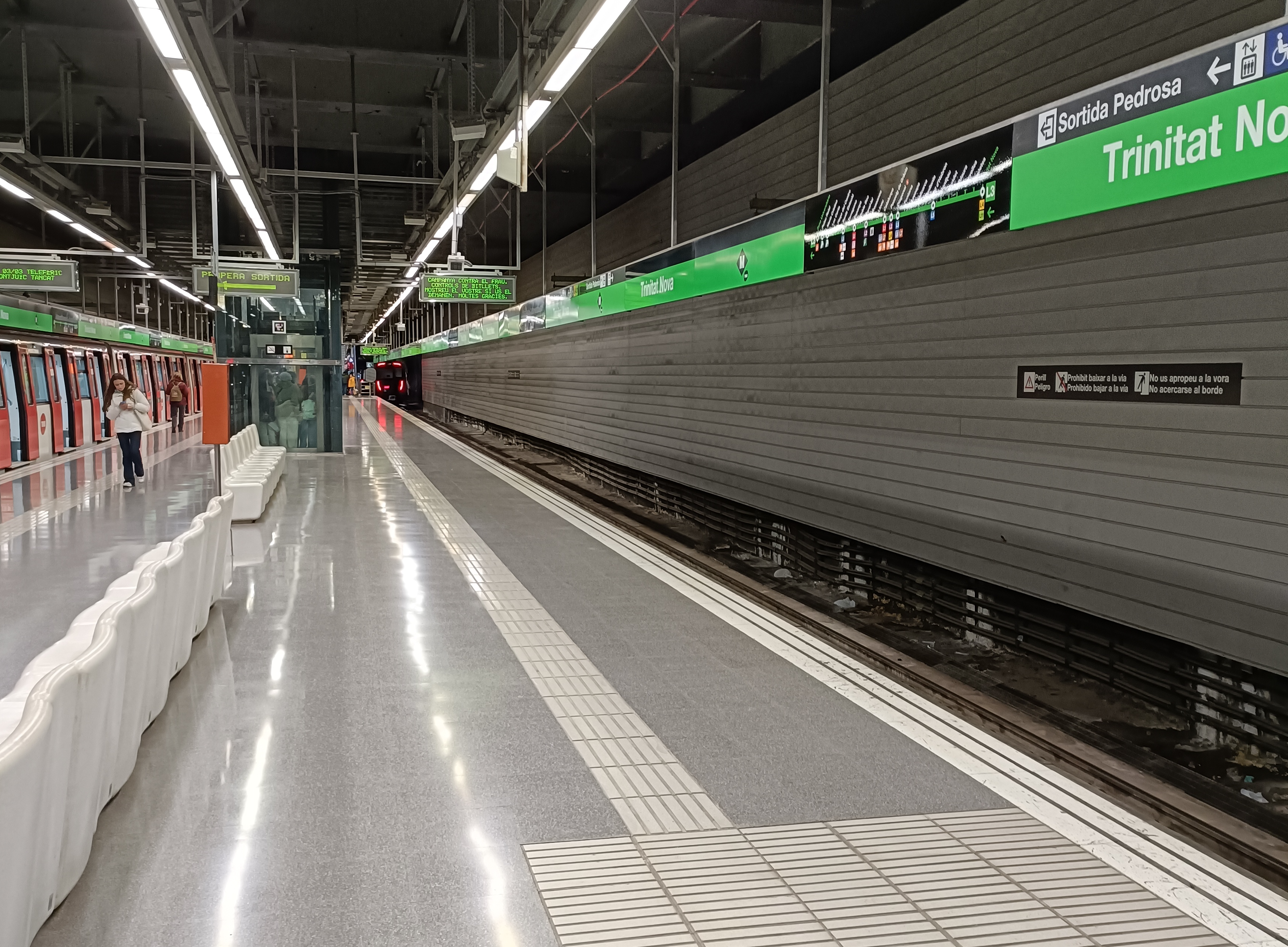
The platform of Line 3

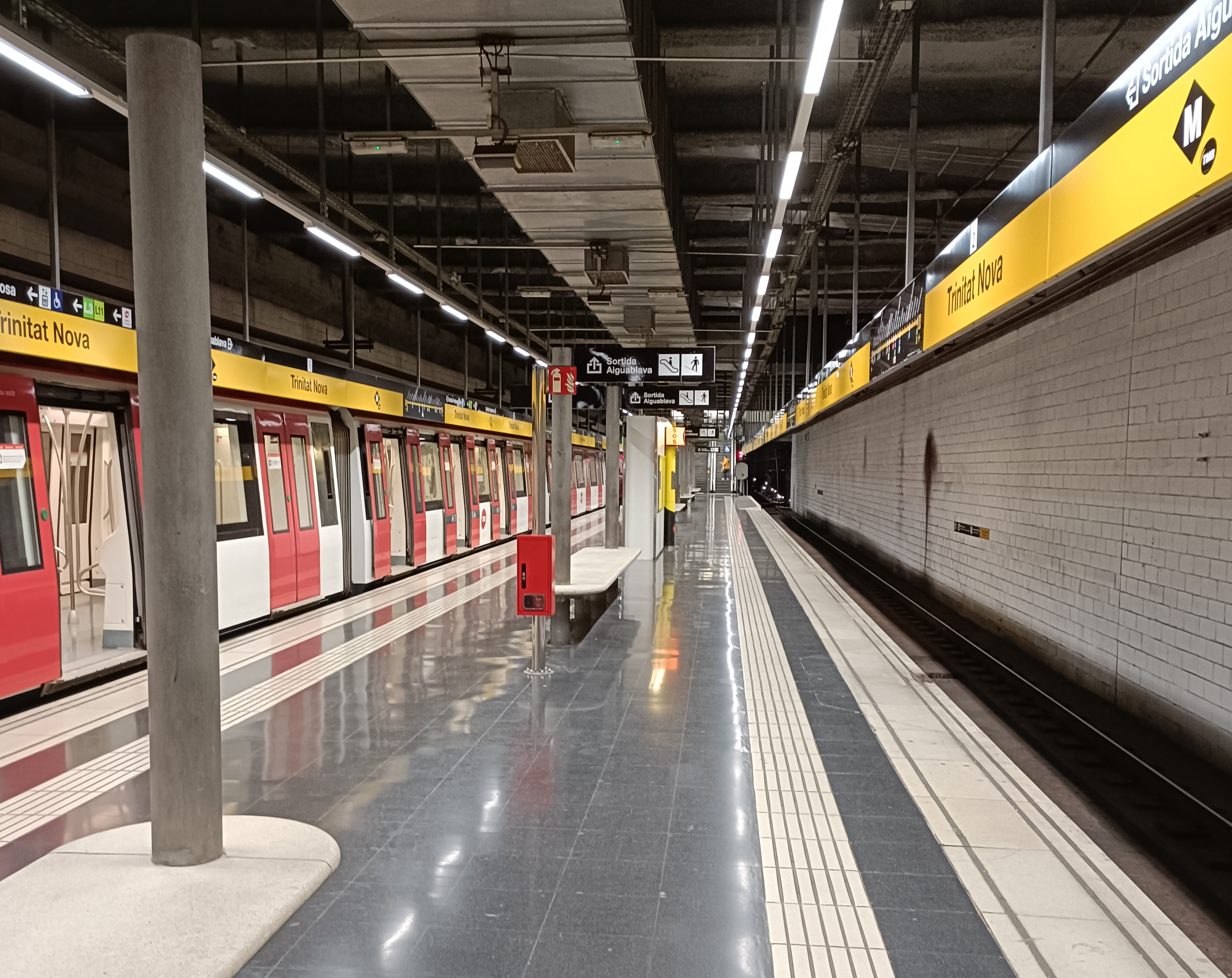
The current appearance of the Line 4 platform

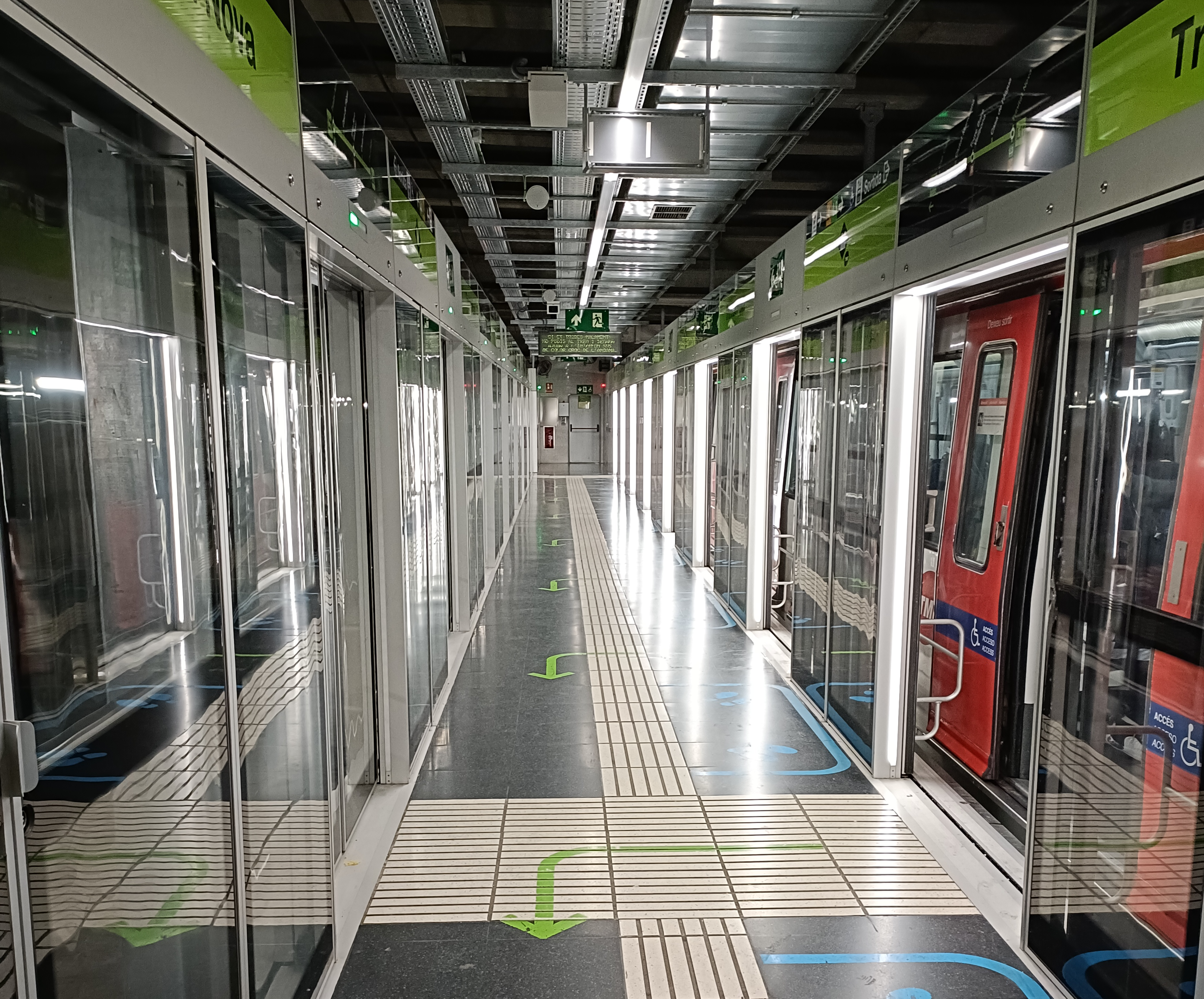
The current appearance of the Line 11 platform

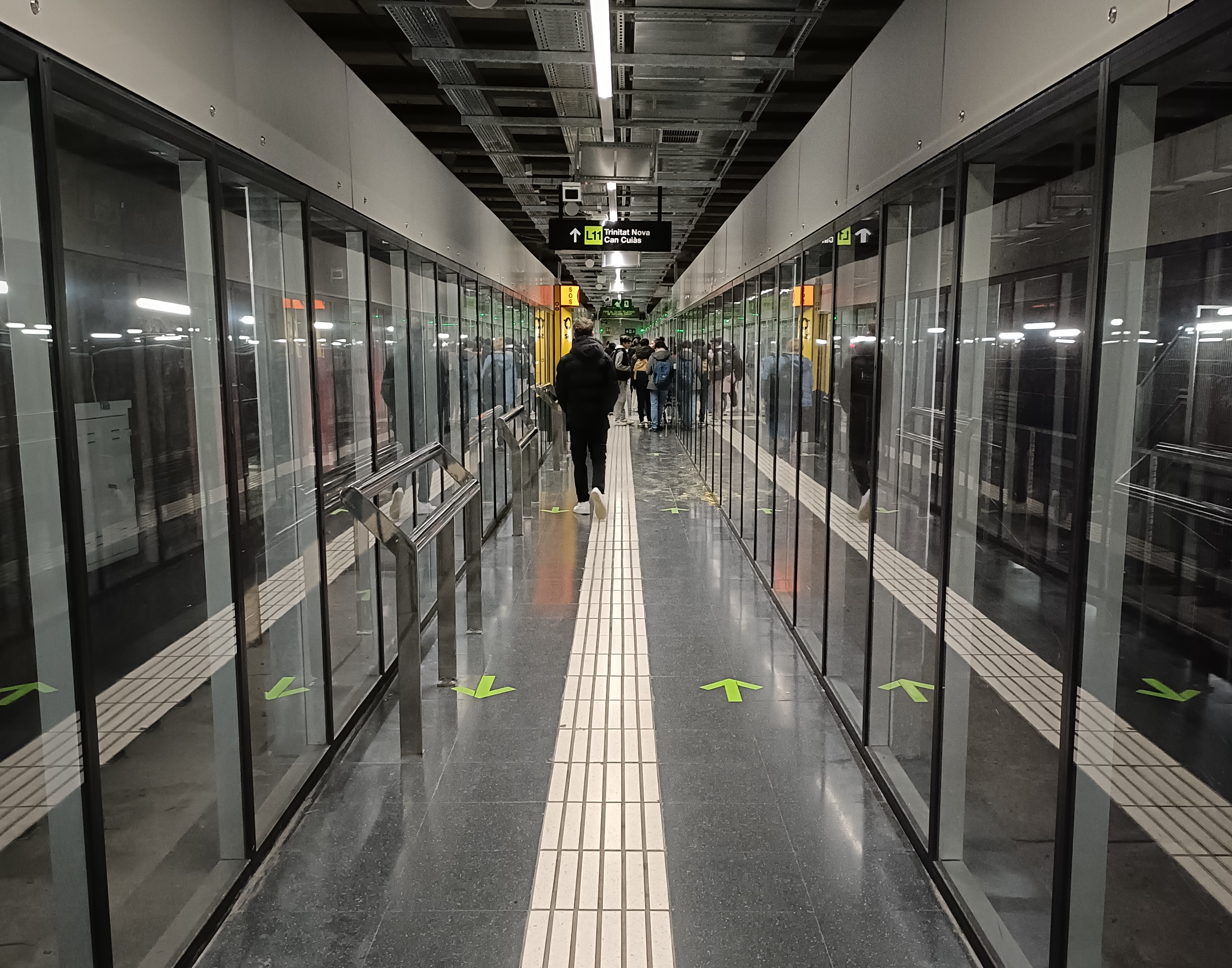
The narrow corridor that connects the platforms of Line 4 and Line 11
