= Barcelona Provincial Council Local Museum Network =

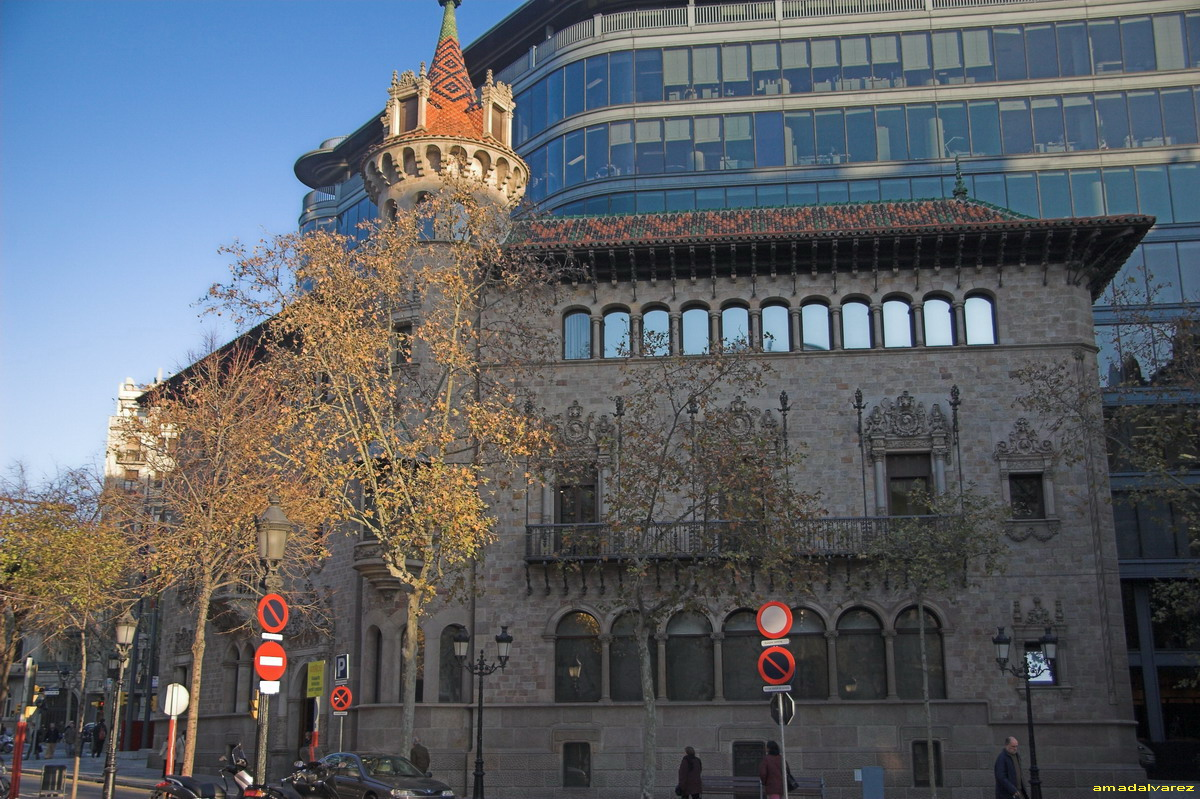
Front of Can Serra, headquarters of Barcelona Provincial Council

The Barcelona Provincial Council Local Museum Network (Catalan: Xarxa de Museus Locals), also known as Catalonia’s Biggest Museum, is a tool for support and collaboration from and for the museums of the province, which makes available to municipalities a series of services and actions aimed at improving, through the provision of direct services and research into viable formulas for supramunicipal cooperation, the management, conservation and dissemination of heritage and the museum facilities of the towns of Barcelona province. It is managed from the Cultural Heritage Office, which in turn depends on the Department of Knowledge and New Technologies of Barcelona Provincial Council.

It was started in 2001, the continuation of a collaboration effort established by the Local Museum Cooperation Committee, which was founded in 1988 in connection with the preparation for the 1st Conference on Museums and Local Administration. Its main objective is to work as a team toward a dynamic, versatile, pluridisciplinary museum model that is in touch with reality and with the lives of people, making local museums centres of public service that are close and accessible to the people, so that they may become benchmarks in the preservation of identity and collective memory as well as new centres of learning, socialisation, leisure and territorial development.

== Museums in the network ==
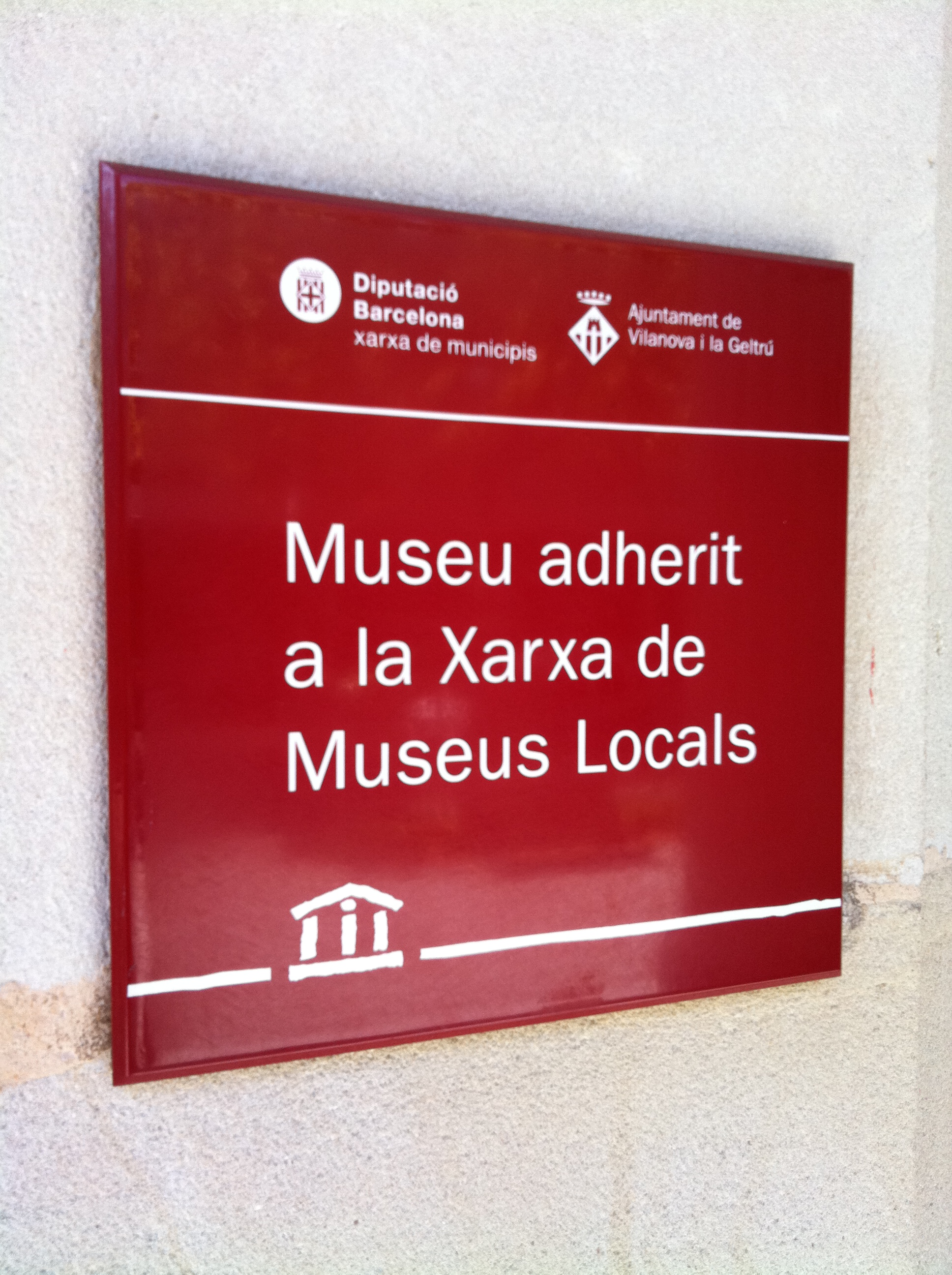
Plaque of the Network at Biblioteca Museu Víctor Balaguer.

In 2013, the network comprised 65 museums or facilities spread over 52 different municipalities:

- Arenys de Mar: Arenys de Mar Museum (Marès Lace Museum and Mollfulleda Mineralogy Museum)
- Argentona: Argentona Water Jug Museum
- Badalona: Badalona Museum
- Berga: Berga Interpretation Area
- Caldes d'Estrac: Palau Foundation
- Caldes de Montbui: Thermalia. Caldes de Montbui Museum
- Calella: Calella Josep M. Codina i Bagué Municipal Archive Museum
- Canet de Mar: Lluís Domènech i Montaner House-Museum
- Capellades: Capellades Paper Mill Museum
- Cardedeu: Cardadeu Tomàs Balvey Museum-Archive
- Castellbisbal: Museu de la Pagesia
- Cercs: Cercs Mine Museum
- Cerdanyola del Vallès: Cerdanyola Art Museum. Can Domènech, Cerdanyola Museum, Ca n'Oliver Iberian Settlement and Museum
- Cornellà de Llobregat: Mercader Palace Museum
- Esplugues de Llobregat: Can Tinturé Museum
- Folgueroles: Verdaguer House-Museum
- Gavà: Gavà Museum and the Gavà Mines Archaeological Park
- Granollers: Granollers Museum, Granollers Museum of Natural Sciences
- L'Hospitalet de Llobregat: Arranz-Bravo Foundation, L'Hospitalet Museum
- Igualada: Igualada Leather and L'Anoia Regional Museum, Muleteer's Museum. Antoni Ros Collection
- Manlleu: El Ter Industrial Museum - Can Sanglas
- Manresa: Museu Comarcal de Manresa
- Martorell: L'Enrajolada, Santacana House-Museum. Martorell, Vicenç Ros Municipal Museum
- El Masnou: El Masnou Municipal Nautical Museum
- Mataró: Mataró Museum
- Moià: Archaeological and Palaeontological Museum – El Toll Caves, Moià
- Molins de Rei: Molins de Rei Municipal Museum
- Mollet del Vallès: Abelló Museum
- Montcada i Reixac: Montcada Municipal Museum
- Montmeló: Montmeló Municipal Museum
- El Prat de Llobregat: El Prat Museum
- Premià de Dalt: Premià de Dalt Museum
- Premià de Mar: Premià de Mar Textile Printing Museum
- Ripollet: Molí d'en Rata Heritage Interpretation Centre
- Roda de Ter: L'Esquerda Archaeological Museum
- Rubí: Rubí Municipal Museum. El Castell-Urban Ecomuseum
- Sabadell: Sabadell Art Museum, Sabadell History Museum
- Sant Adrià del Besòs: History of Immigration in Catalonia Museum
- Sant Andreu de Llavaneres: Sant Andreu de Llavaneres Archive Museum
- Sant Boi de Llobregat: Sant Boi de Llobregat Museum
- Sant Cugat del Vallès: Sant Cugat Museum
- Sant Joan Despí: Jujol Centre - Can Negre
- Santa Coloma de Gramenet: Balldovina Tower Museum
- Sitges: Cau Ferrat Museum, Maricel Museum, Can Llopis Romanticism Museum
- Terrassa: Textile Museum and Documentation Centre and Terrassa Museum
- Tona: El Camp de les Lloses Interpretation Centre and Site
- Vic: Museum of Leather Artistry. A. Colomer Munmany Collection
- Viladecans: Ca n'Amat
- Vilafranca del Penedès: Casa de la Festa Major de Vilafranca del Penedès, Vinseum - Catalan Wine Cultures Museum
- Vilanova i la Geltrú: Can Papiol Romanticism Museum, Biblioteca Museu Víctor Balaguer
- Vilassar de Dalt: Vilassar de Dalt Archive-Museum
- Vilassar de Mar: Vilassar de Mar Municipal Museum
