= Molins de Rei Municipal Museum =

Local history museum in Molins de Rei, Spain

Coordinates: 41°24′51″N 2°00′58″E

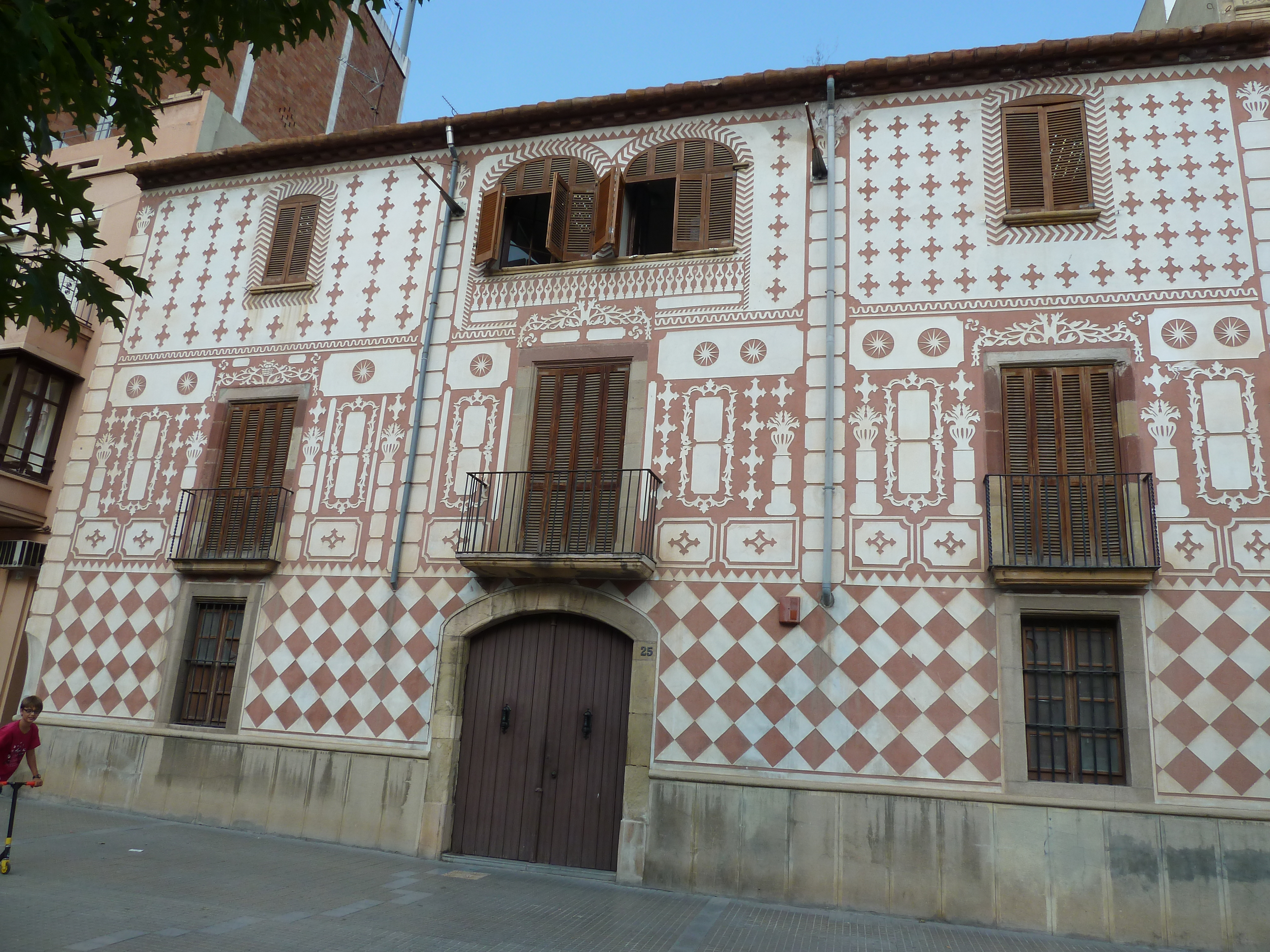
- Location: Spain
- Website: https://molinsderei.cat/museu/
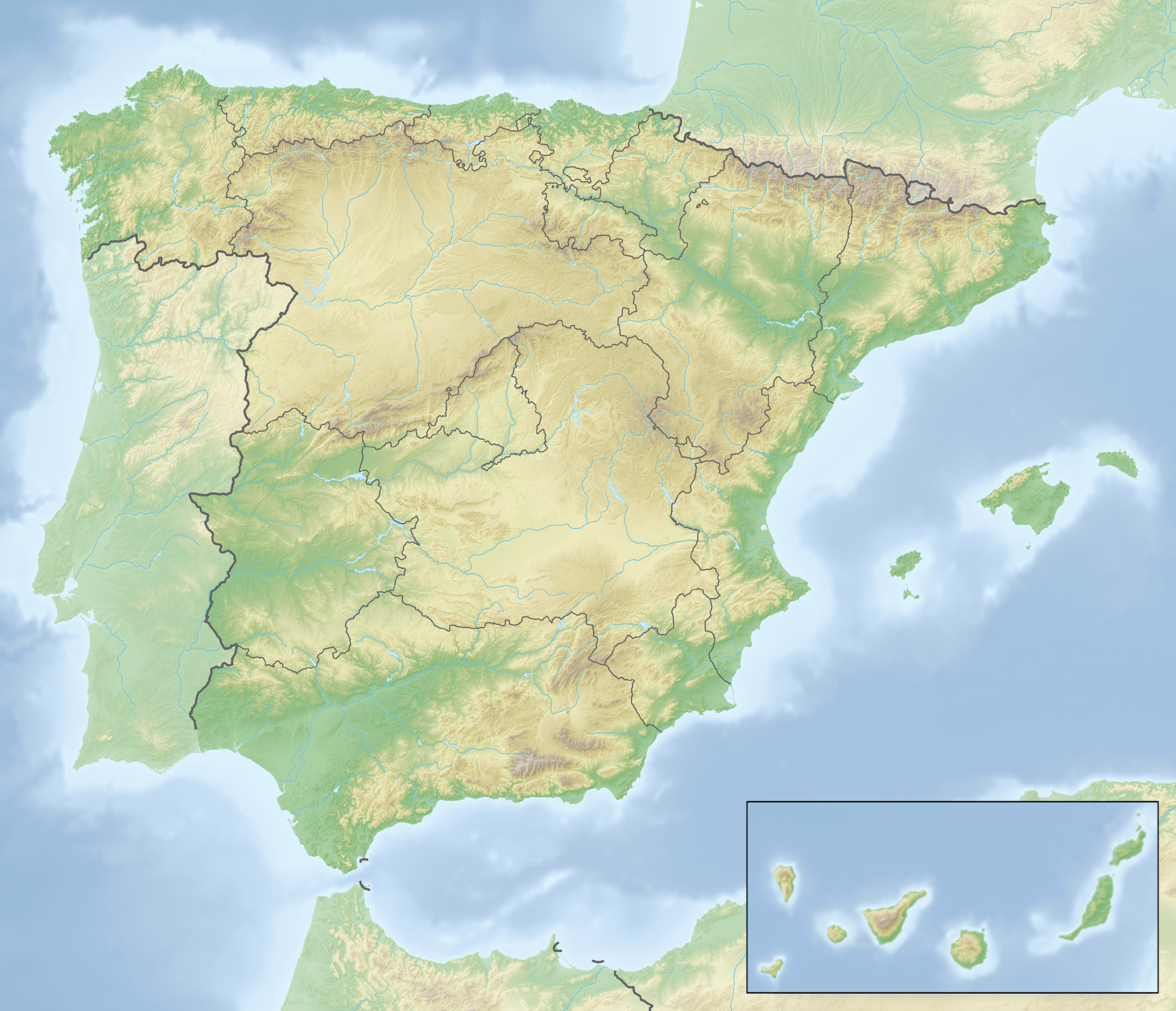
- Location of Molins de Rei Municipal Museum

The Molins de Rei Municipal Museum is a local history museum that reflects the history, culture and craftsmanship of the town of Molins de Rei, in the region of El Baix Llobregat, Catalonia, Spain, and of the neighbouring areas closest to the town. The museum, which is part of the Barcelona Provincial Council Local Museum Network, was created in 1953; it has a permanent exhibition at its central location at number 55, Carrer Pintor Fortuny, and also has a temporary exhibition space at Ca n'Ametller, which is where the museum will eventually be located.
