= Mercader Palace Museum =

Coordinates: 41°21′26.39″N 2°5′6.54″E

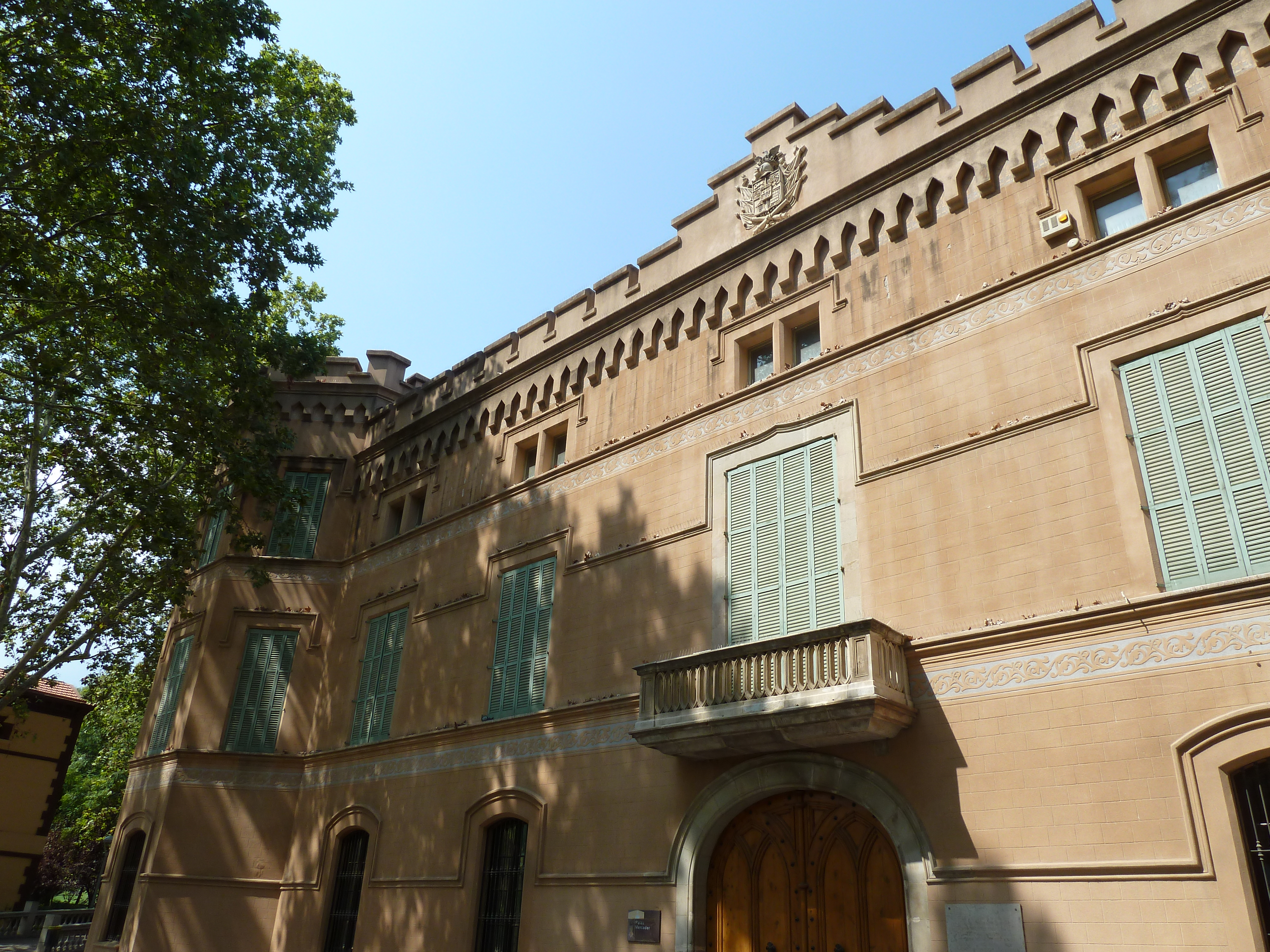
Mercader Palace Museum

The Mercader Palace Museum (Catalan: Museu Palau Mercader) in Cornellà de Llobregat contains more than 3,000 objects from the museum of the Count of Bell-lloc and is an example of the lifestyle and cultural and artistic tastes of an aristocratic family of the 19th century. It is located in the Palau Mercader (Mercader Palace), built in the 19th century by Josep Domínguez Valls, in an eclectic style. It was opened on 23 April 1995 and belongs to the Barcelona Provincial Council Local Museum Network.
