= Cultural Heritage Office of Barcelona Provincial Council =

Council office in Barcelona, Spain

The Cultural Heritage Office of Barcelona Provincial Council (Oficina de Patrimoni Cultural or OPC in Catalan) is a service of the Department of Knowledge and New Technologies of Barcelona Provincial Council specialising in working with town councils on technical projects to conserve and promote cultural heritage. Its involvement is intended to lend support to the areas, technical offices and municipal services responsible for the management of local cultural heritage and to the specialised cultural facilities—namely, museums and archives—that depend on them. Its roots lie in the Technical Section for Museums, which was responsible for coordinating the museums of Barcelona Provincial Council and which became the Technical Section for Heritage in 1992, in response to the need to adapt to the new conceptions of heritage, redirect its objectives and specialise the nature of its actions. In 1996 the name was changed to the current one. The OPC views heritage as a public service and as a factor in territorial development on a local and regional scale. Therefore, it bases its action on the principles of bringing management closer to the people and substituting authority with cooperation. Its actions are structured around three programmes: The Local Museum Network, the Municipal Archive Network and the Programme for Cultural Heritage Studies and Projects. The office also manages the movable artistic heritage of Barcelona Provincial Council, dispersed throughout different warehouses and corporate associates.

== See also ==
- Barcelona Provincial Council Local Museum Network
