= Premià de Mar Textile Printing Museum =

Coordinates: 41°29′18.73″N 2°21′8.19″E

Premià de Mar Textile Printing Municipal Museum
- Museu Municipal de l'Estampació de Premià de Mar
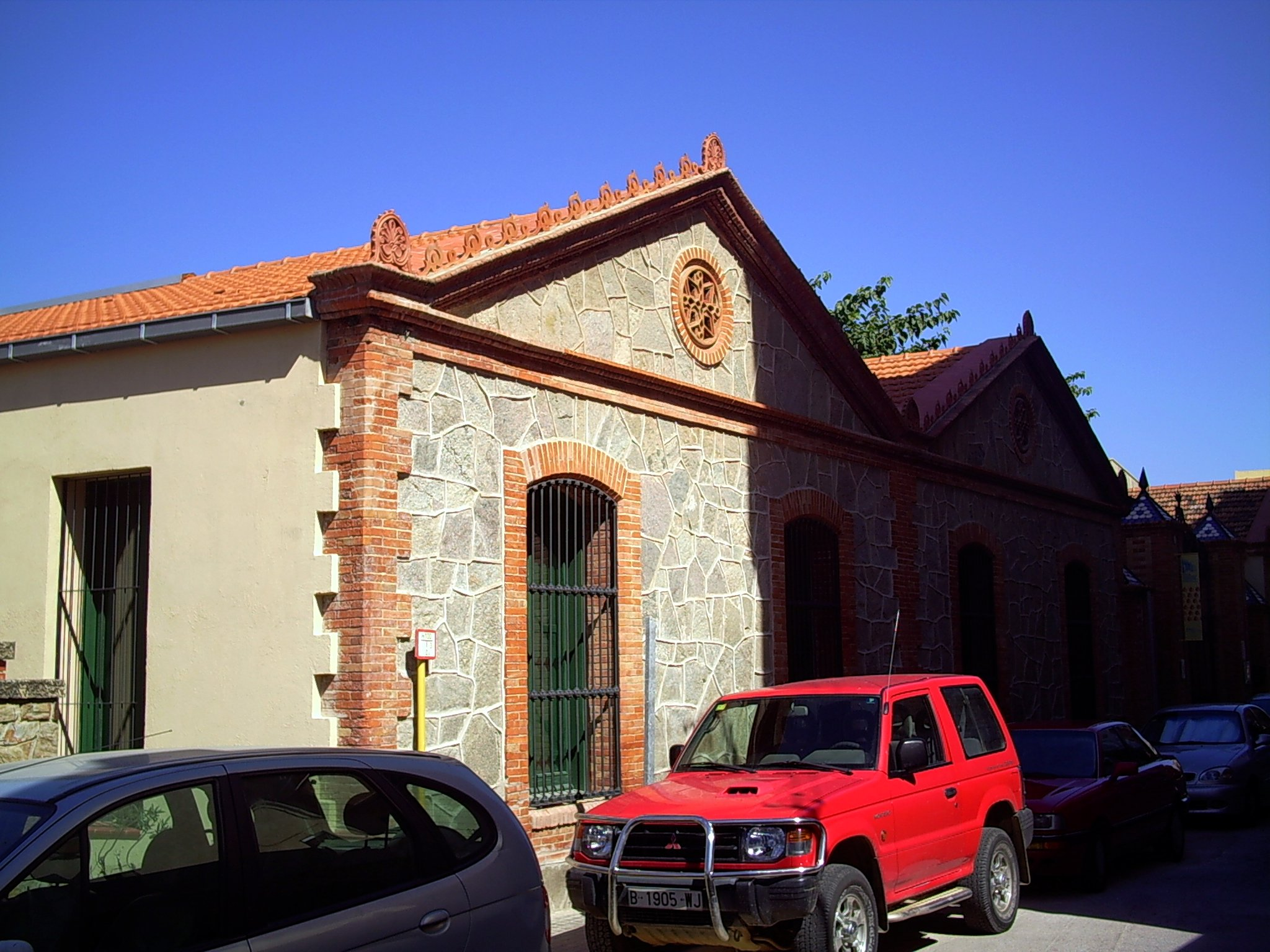
- Headquarter of the Premià de Mar Textile Printing Museum
- Established: 2005
- Location: Premià de Mar (Catalonia)
- Type: Textile museum
- Website: museuestampacio.pdm.cat

The Premià de Mar Printing Museum (Catalan: Museu Municipal de l'Estampació de Premià de Mar), located in the old gas factory of the town, is a museum dedicated to explaining the history of textile printing in Premià de Mar and all of Catalonia. It is part of Science and Technology Museum of Catalonia and the Barcelona Provincial Council Local Museum Network. Its main objective is to expose samples and objects related to textile printing and to explain the techniques used over time, as well as to highlight the important role that this economic activity has played in the past as a driver of industrialisation in Catalonia.

== Location ==
On 14 April 2002, new facilities were opened at the gas works, an Art Nouveau and Neoclassical building built in 1884. It is the only coal gas works still standing in Catalonia. In 2005 the permanent exhibition was opened, which displayed the various textile printing techniques and their evolution from the 18th century up to the present day. Some fabrics and dresses from the era as well as reproductions can also be seen.
