= El Prat Museum =

Museum located in Barcelona, Spain

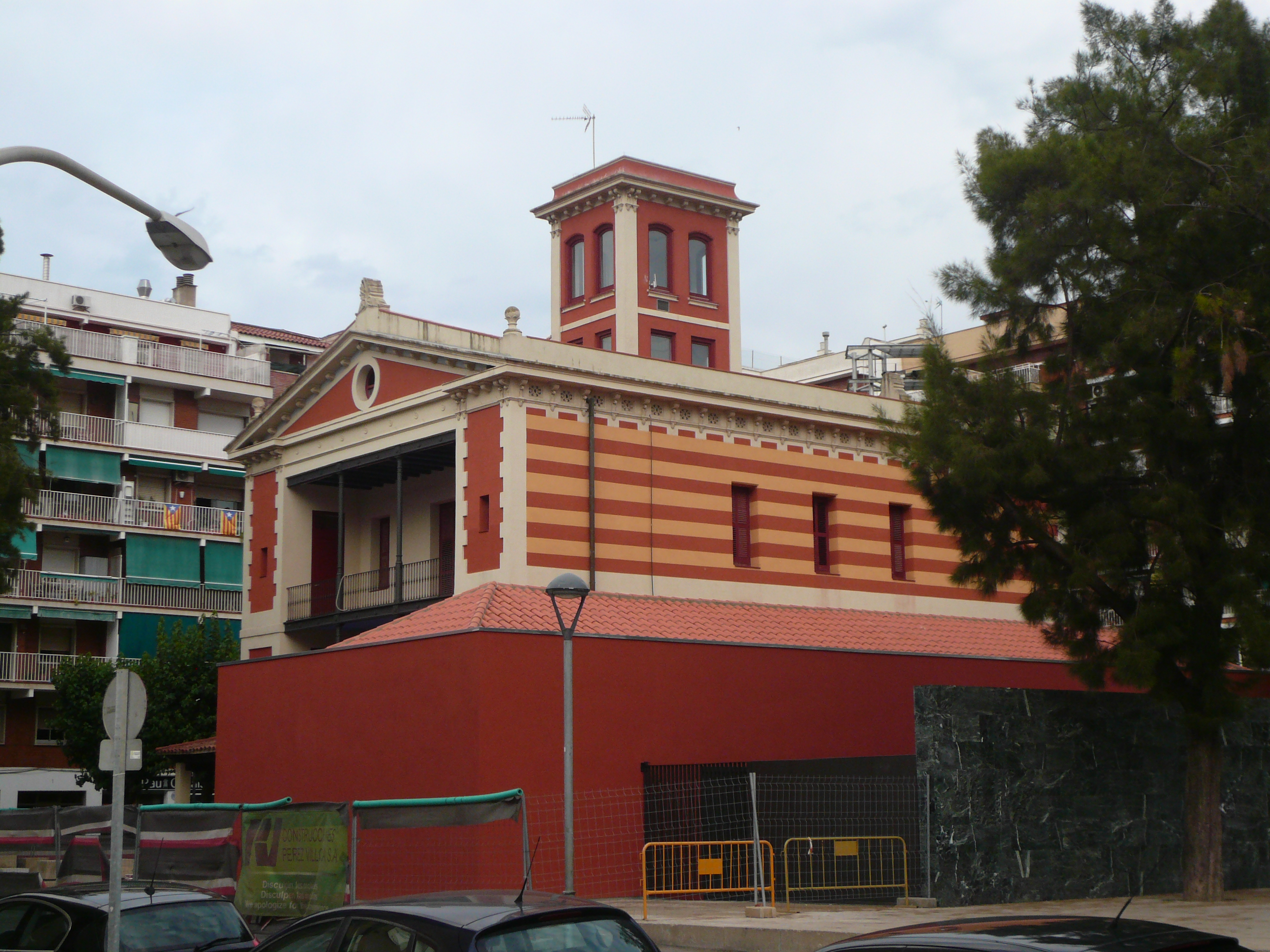
- Location: Spain
- Coordinates: 41.3262°N 2.0939°E
- Website: www.patrimonicultural.elprat.cat
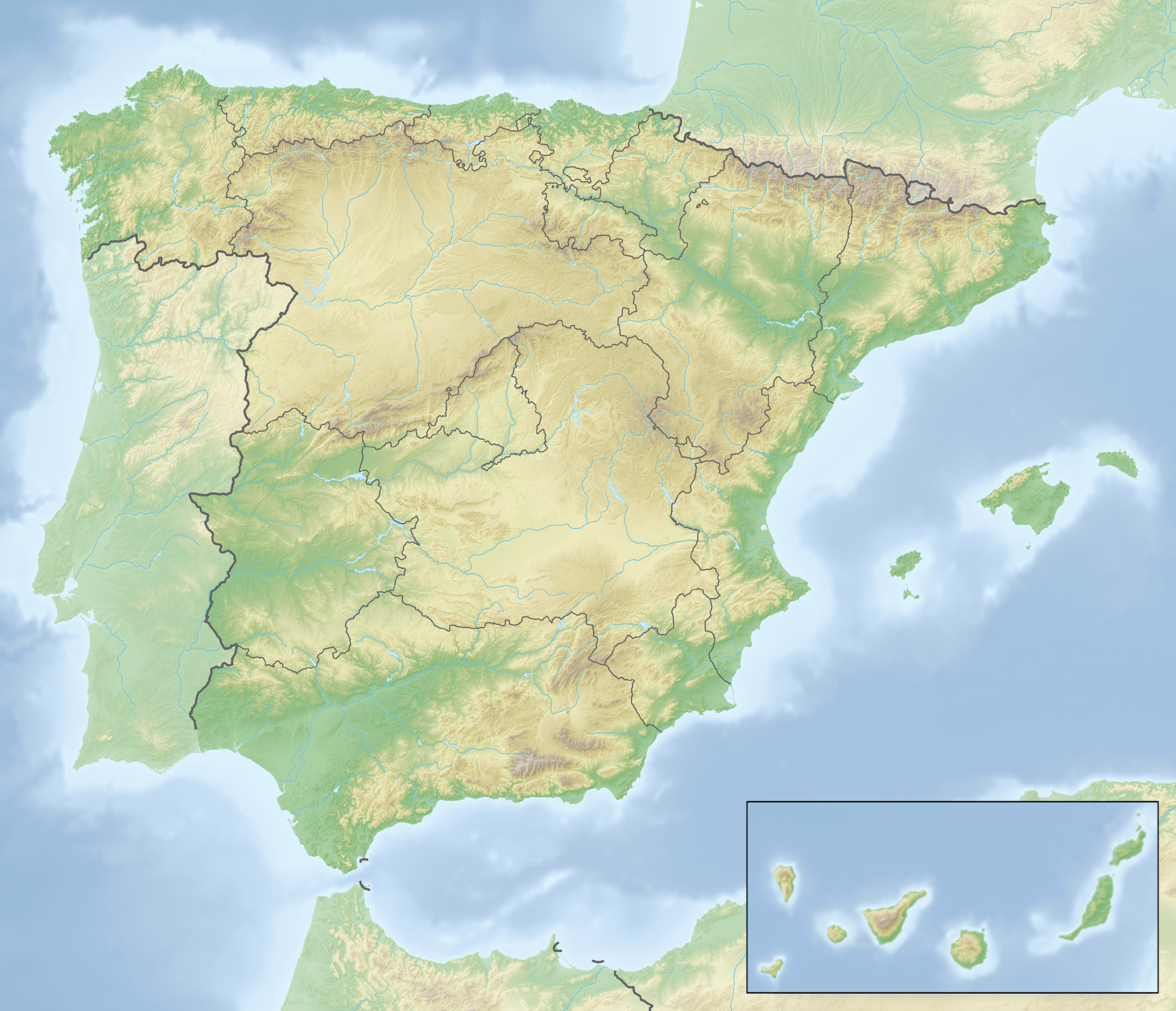
- Location of El Prat Museum

The El Prat Museum, in El Prat de Llobregat (Baix Llobregat), Catalonia, was created in 1962 as part of an initiative of the town council to recover the town’s historic and natural heritage. It is located in Balcells Tower, a building from the mid-19th century that was used for farming and as a summer residence, and is part of the Barcelona Provincial Council Local Museum Network. In the next few years the El Prat Museum will relocate to a new building currently under construction.

== Exhibition ==
The museum collection is divided into three large blocks: a vast collection of material related to El Prat’s agricultural and industrial past; an ornithological collection, representing the rich fauna of the Llobregat Delta; and a contemporary art collection that currently includes 300 works of art. The central theme of the permanent exhibition, remodelled in 1996, is the process behind the formation and transformation of the Llobregat Delta.
