= Can Tinturé Museum =

Tile museum in Spain

Coordinates: 41°22′42″N 2°05′13″E

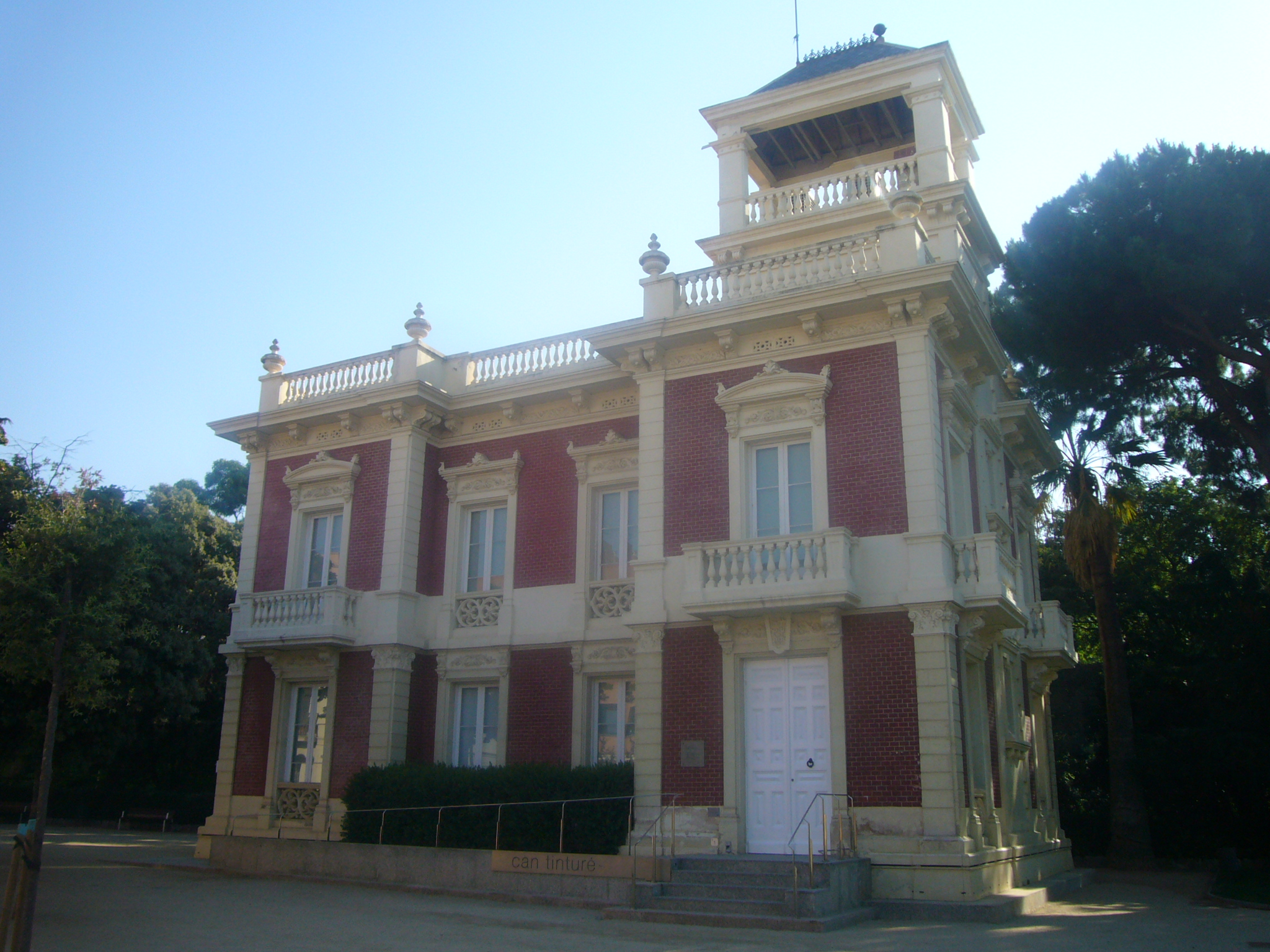
Front of the Can Tinturé Museum

The Can Tinturé Museum, in Esplugues de Llobregat, is located in a house built at the end of the 19th century by architect Claudi Duran i Ventosa, and is the first monographic sample tile museum in Spain. The Can Tinturé Museum also manages the museum at the Pujol i Bausis factory, La Rajoleta, which was a point of reference in the production of Catalan industrial tiles, especially during the highpoint of Art Nouveau. The Museum is part of the Barcelona Provincial Council Local Museum Network and of the territorial system of the Science and Technology Museum of Catalonia.

The Can Tinturé Museum collection consists mainly of the Salvador Miquel sample tile collection, acquired in 1999 by the Esplugues Town Council and which has more than 3,000 tiles of different styles and models, from medieval times to industrial production.

== La Rajoleta ==
The Pujol i Bausis ceramic factory, also known as La Rajoleta (meaning small tile in Catalan), opened to the public as a museum in 2002. It has a small permanent exhibition that explains the history and production of the factory.
