= Museu de la Pagesia =

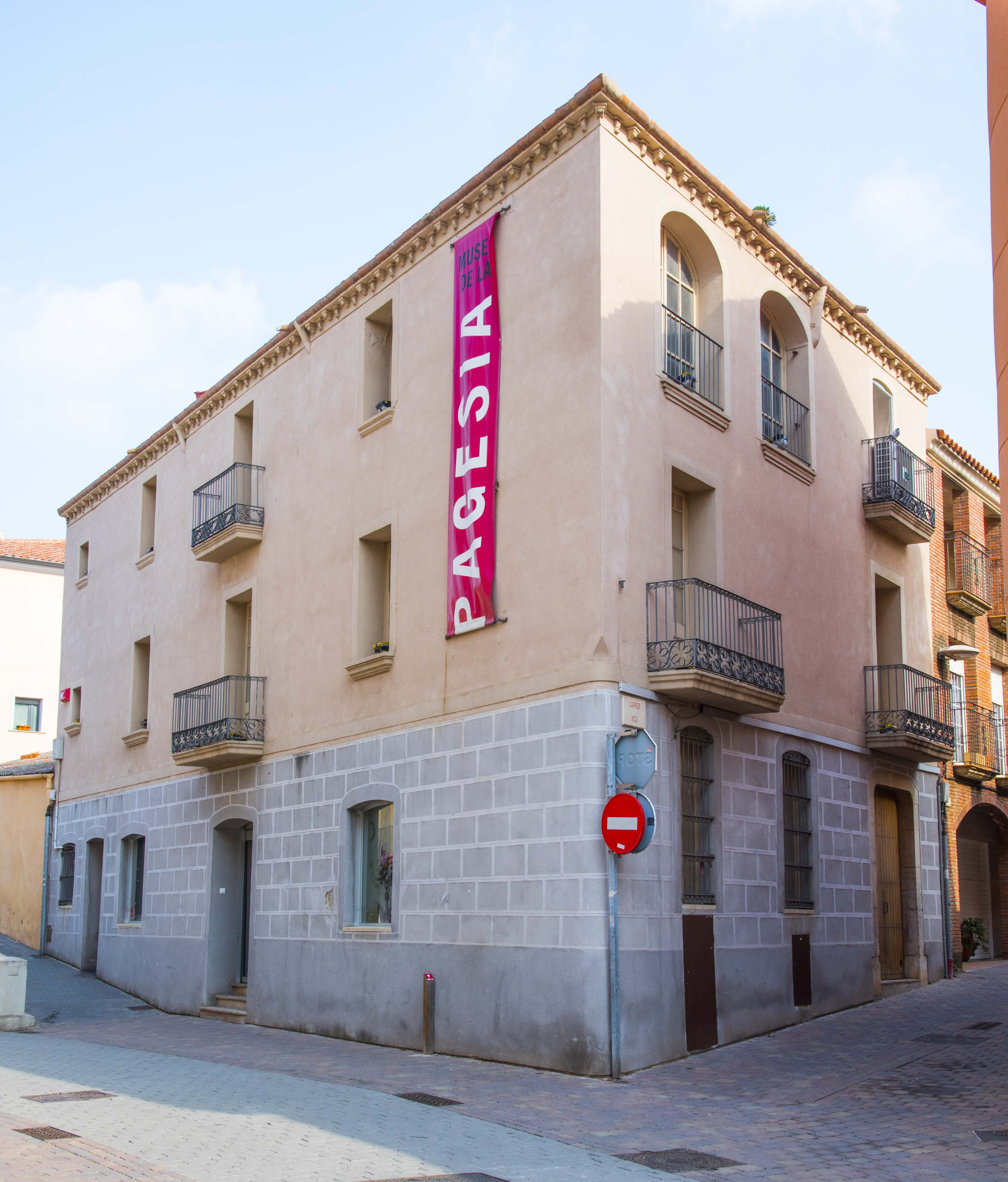
- Location: Spain
- Coordinates: 41°28′27″N 1°58′48″E
- Website: www.castellbisbal.cat/castellbisbal/equipaments/museudelapagesia.html
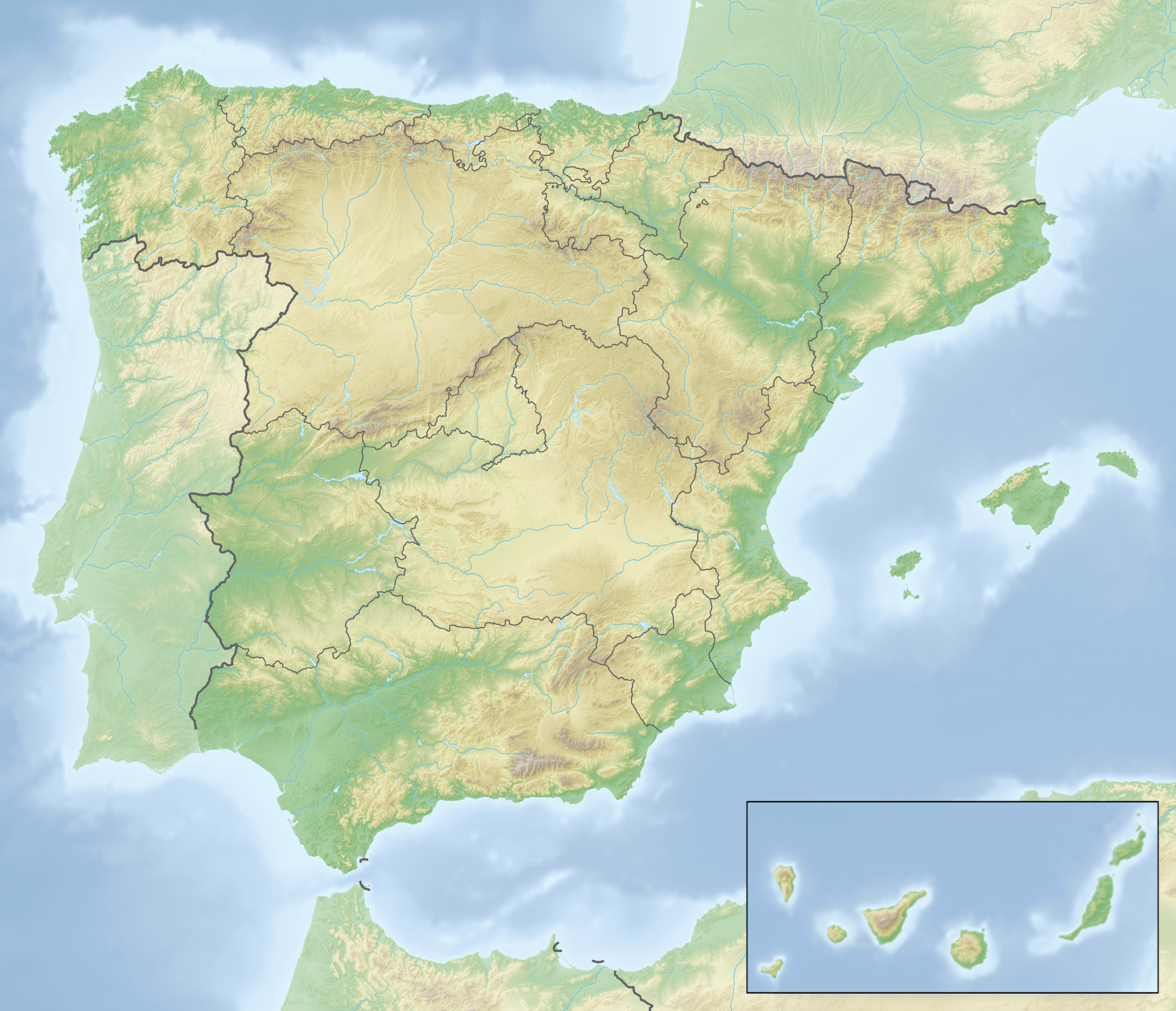
- Location of Museu de la Pagesia

The Museu de la Pagesia (Rural Life Museum), in Castellbisbal, Vallès Occidental, Catalonia was created to preserve and disseminate local cultural heritage associated with agricultural life. The Museum’s collection comprises homemade tools and those for use in the fields, photographs and personal accounts, which create a permanent exhibition that gives an overview of traditional farming in the town, work in the field and the social structure of rural life. The permanent exhibition is divided into three areas: the people, the land, and market and transport. The Museum is part of the Barcelona Provincial Council Local Museum Network.
