= Berga Interpretation Area =

Municipal museum located in Spain

- Catalan: Centre d'Interpretació de Berga
- Location: Berga, Catalonia, Spain
- Coordinates: 42°6′15.22″N 1°50′45.44″E
- Type: Municipal
- Website: www.turismeberga.cat

The Berga Interpretation Area (Catalan: Centre d'Interpretació de Berga) is a municipal museum located in Berga, the capital of El Berguedà in Catalonia, Spain. It has a permanent exhibition. It is part of the Berga Regional Museum and the Barcelona Provincial Council Local Museum Network.

== Exhibition ==
The Berga Interpretation Area analyses local history, beginning with the birth of the urban centre and its evolution, then on to all the periods of history thereafter, with commentary on the period in which the town was called Bourbon town, mainly due to the castle there. It also explains the Carlist period of the town.
