= L'Esquerda Archaeological Museum =

Coordinates: 41°58′52″N 2°18′33″E

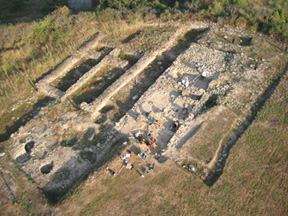
Aerial view of L'Esquerda Archaeological site

The L’Esquerda Archaeological Museum, located in Roda de Ter, was opened in 1988 as a place to house the material from the archaeological excavations at the L'Esquerda site and bring the findings closer to the public. It is part of the Barcelona Provincial Council Local Museum Network and 'The Iberian Route', organised by the Archaeological Museum of Catalonia (MAC).

== Exhibition ==
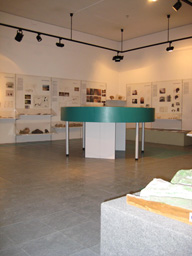
Exhibition hall

The museum organises the theme of its permanent exhibition into different sections: the geographic environment; excavation methodology and analysis; and different aspects of the two best-known periods of the site up until now: the L'Esquerda of the Iberians and the L'Esquerda of the Middle Ages. Since 2003, it also includes the exhibition "Desperta Ferro!" (Awake, Iron!), which provides a compilation of the most significant metals recovered in the excavations.

In addition to exhibiting archaeological material from the site, the L’Esquerda Museum is also the body responsible for disseminating and coordinating associated activities.
