= Premià de Dalt Museum =

Local history museum in Premià de Dalt, Spain

Coordinates: 41°30′17.52″N 2°20′48.33″E

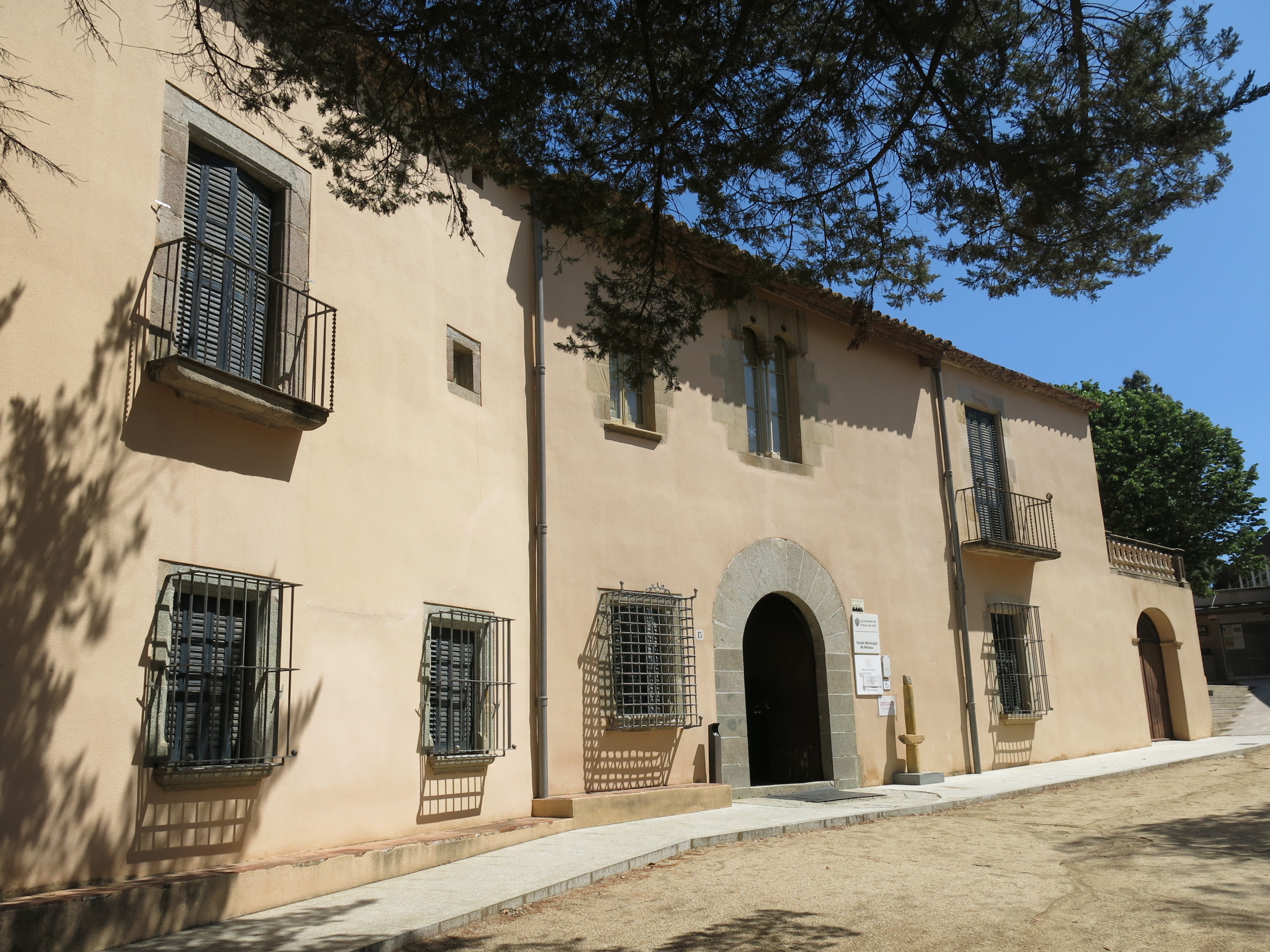
Façade of the Premià de Dalt Museum

The aim of Premià de Dalt Museum is to compile, study and disseminate the rich heritage of Premià de Dalt (Maresme) to be found in archaeological, archival, architectural and urban elements. The museum, which is part of the Barcelona Provincial Council Local Museum Network, is based on a project to create a museum that is open, fun and participative.

The museum is located in one of the buildings of the Mas Figueres estate, dating back to the 13th century, although the area the museum is housed in seems to be from the 15th century.

== Exhibition ==
The permanent exhibition is divided into three different areas: the De Masia a Museu (From Farmhouse to Museum) collection, with objects from Can Figueres, the museum's central location, that document the changes undergone by the farmhouse; the dynamic layout Jo, Premià (I, Premià), which presents a virtual journey through the history of the town; and, lastly, the touch screen Premià (des) de Dalt (Premià from above), which allows visitors to view images and the history of the town’s most emblematic heritage points on a large aerial map.
