= El Camp de les Lloses Interpretation Centre and Site =

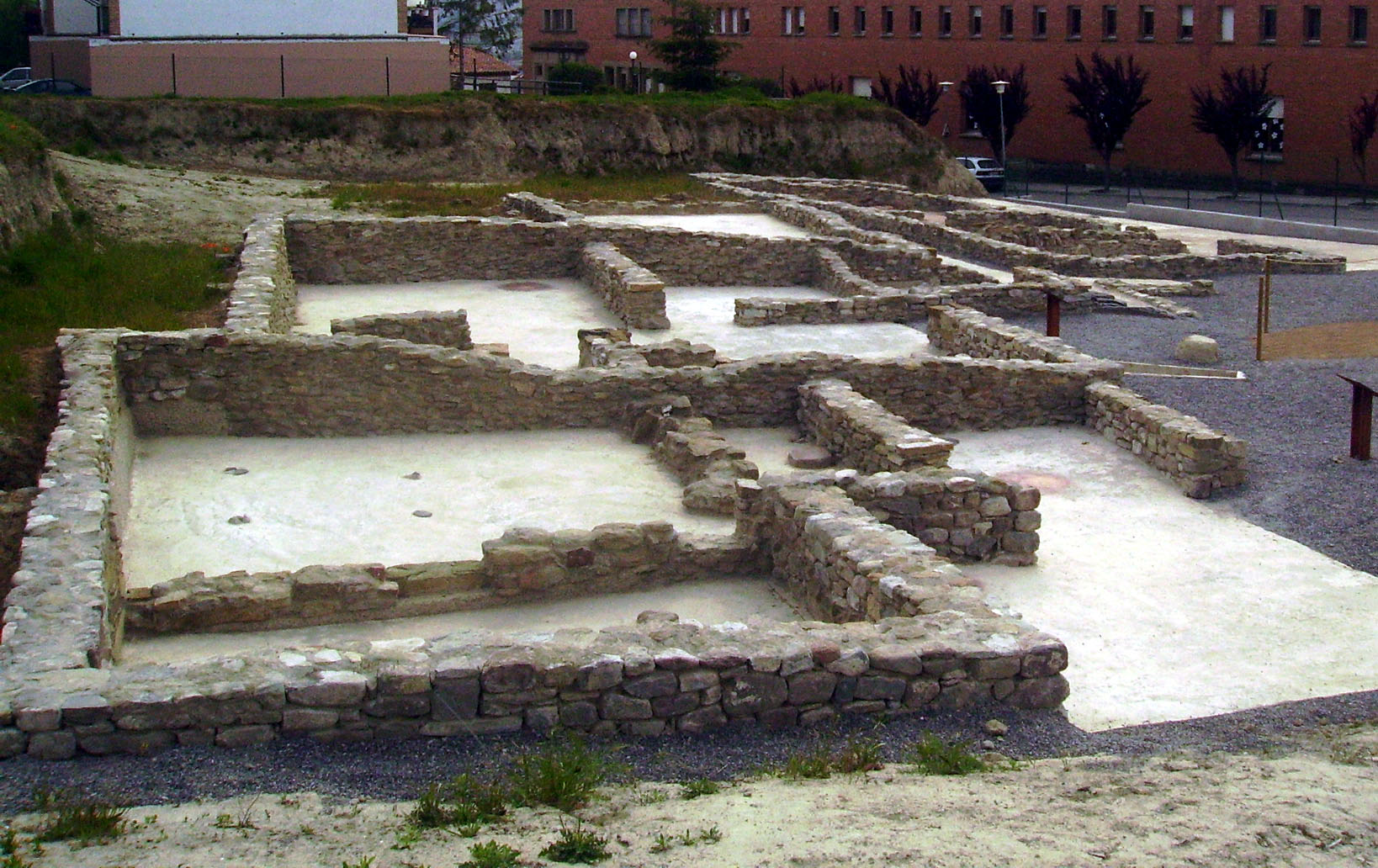
View of the settlement

El Camp de les Lloses was a Roman settlement located in the area around present-day Tona (Osona) and founded between the 2nd and 1st centuries BC.

== History of the site ==
The site excavations began in 1915 when purely by accident the Iberian stele at Tona was unearthed; in 1944, as a result of torrential rains, a first settlement level was documented, with structures from the Iberian period, and a possible second level with buried human remains with stones situated chronologically from around the 6th and 7th centuries BC. In the beginning of the 1990s, a large number of structures were identified all over the area and in 1995 the site was classified as Cultural Heritage of National Interest (BCIN). From that time up until 2006, archaeological digs and the museumization of the remains discovered actively took place.

== Interpretation centre ==
In July 2006, the El Camp de les Lloses Interpretation Centre was opened. The centre exhibits the archaeological collection from the site and explains the modus vivendi of the settlers of El Camp de les Lloses. It is part of the Barcelona Provincial Council Local Museum Network.
