= Ca n'Amat =

Coordinates: 41°19′0.34″N 2°1′11.12″E

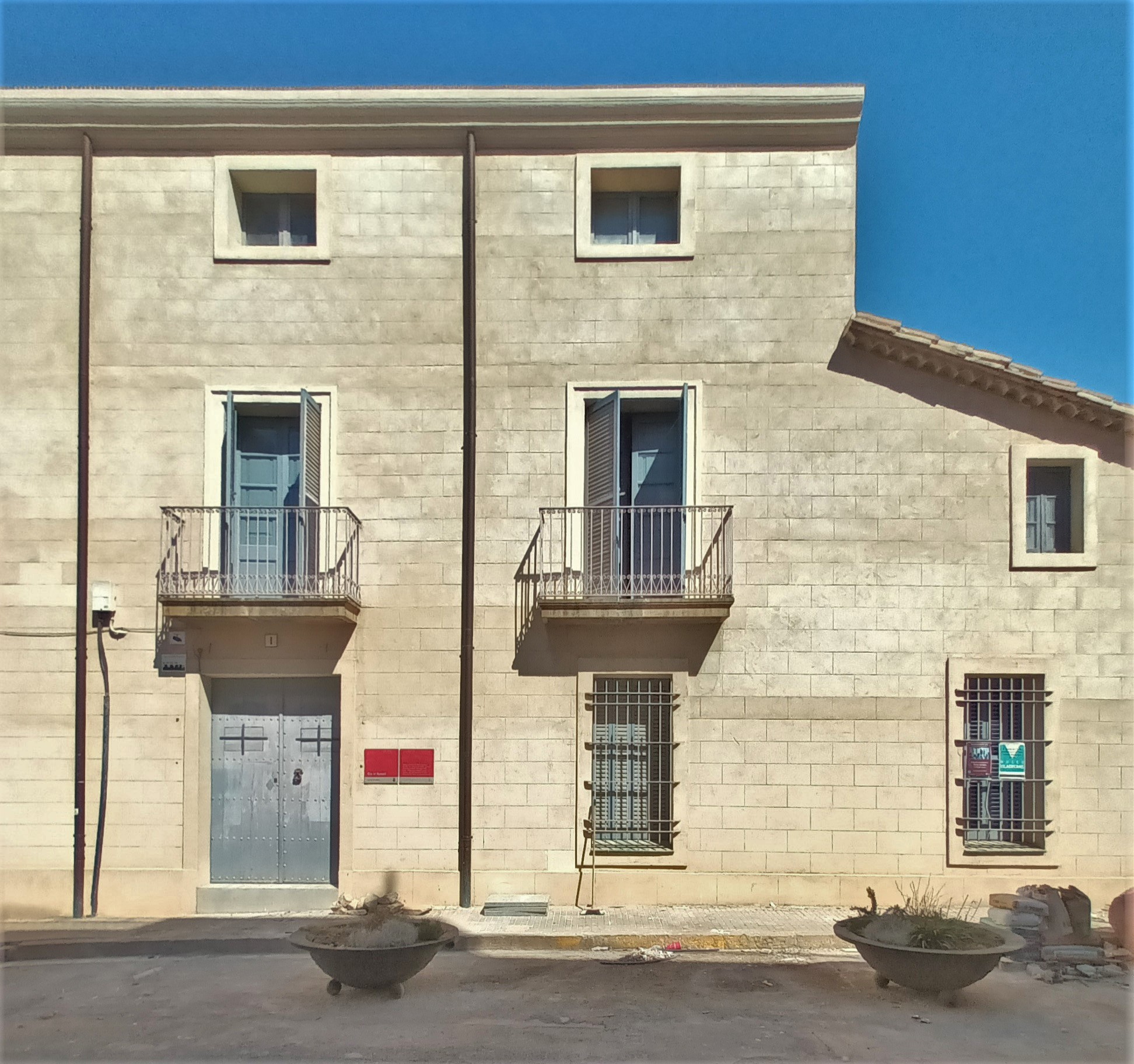
Ca n'Amat - Viladecans - Barcelona - Catalunya

Ca n’Amat is a museum facility owned by the municipality of Viladecans (Baix Llobregat), which is part of the Barcelona Provincial Council Local Museum Network. The building is an example of the typical country home a well-to-do family would have in the 19th century, with elements connected to agricultural life, the basic activity in Viladecans in the 19th and part of the 20th centuries. Therefore, in the rooms and bedrooms of the owners, Isabelline Gothic and Art Nouveau furniture coexists with the kitchen and the storage silos inside the house and the wine presses on the patio. Periodically, the town council organises a series of leisure and cultural activities to get to know the history and heritage of the city, such as guided visits of the building, temporary exhibits and talks.
