= Balldovina Tower Museum =

Museum in the Barcelona Province, (Spain)

Coordinates: 41°26′48.26″N 2°12′36.05″E

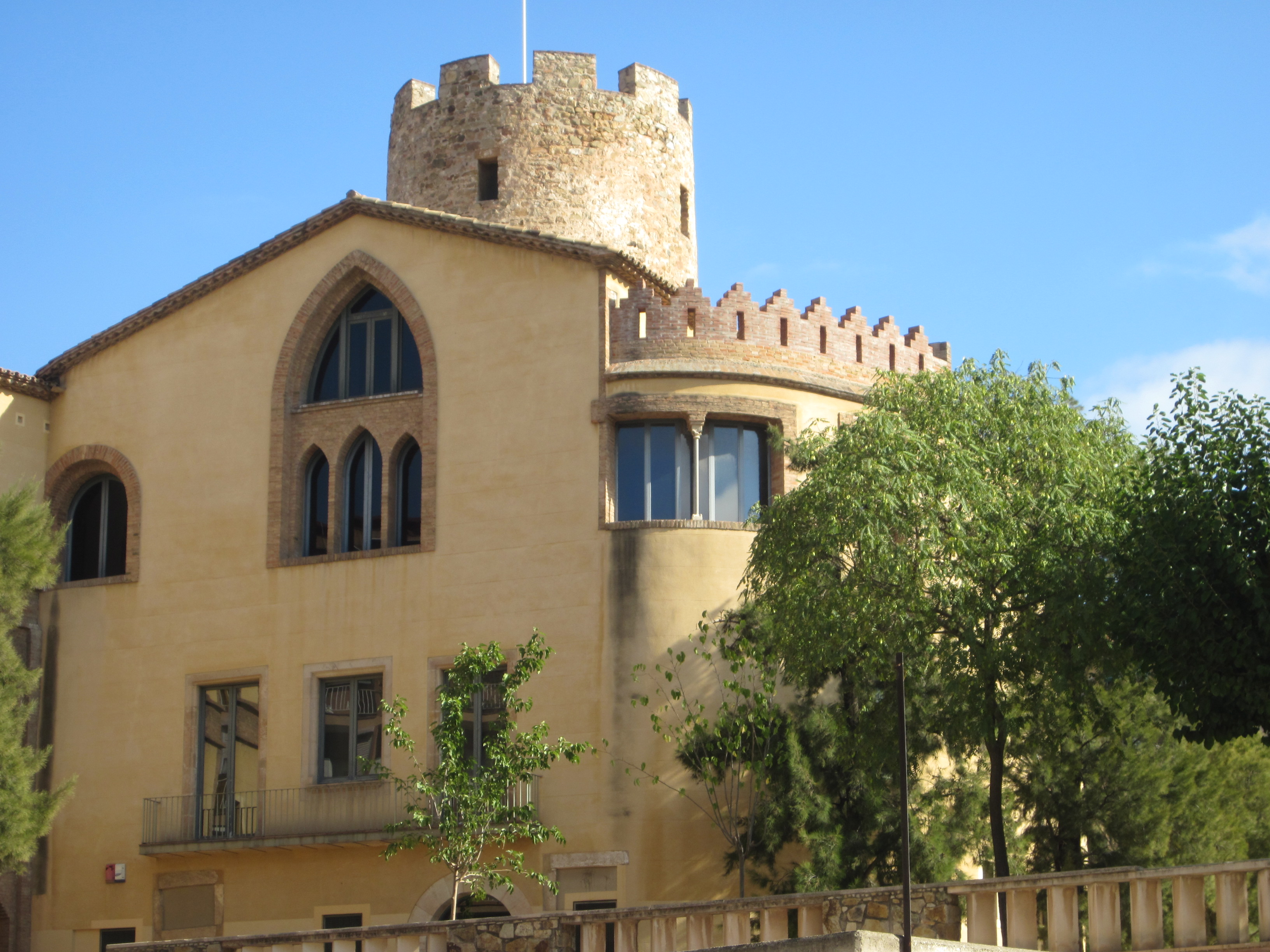
Balldovina Tower

The Balldovina Tower Museum (Catalan: Museu Torre Balldovina) of Santa Coloma de Gramenet in Catalonia, Spain, is a local pluridisciplinary museum, the aim of which is to protect, conserve, study and disseminate the cultural and natural heritage of the territory. The museum, which is part of the Barcelona Provincial Council Local Museum Network, looks after its own collections as well as the monumental heritage of the town of Santa Coloma.

== The building ==
The museum is located in Balldovina Tower, a building that has gone through many transformations over time: a defence tower in the 11th century, a building used for agricultural purposes in the 14th century, a large house in the 18th century, and, finally, the summer residence of the family of writer Josep Maria de Sagarra. In 1972 it was purchased by the town council, and since 1987 it houses the municipal museum and the city's historic archive.

== Collection ==
Among the collections at the Balldovina Tower Museum, of particular note are Iberian archaeological materials from the Puig Castellar and Can Calvet settlements, the medieval materials from the En Ribé mill (a 14th-century flour mill) and Mas Fonollar, and artefacts from agricultural life in rural Santa Coloma. It also has an important natural history collection.
