= Textile Museum and Documentation Centre =

Coordinates: 41°33′55″N 2°1′10″E

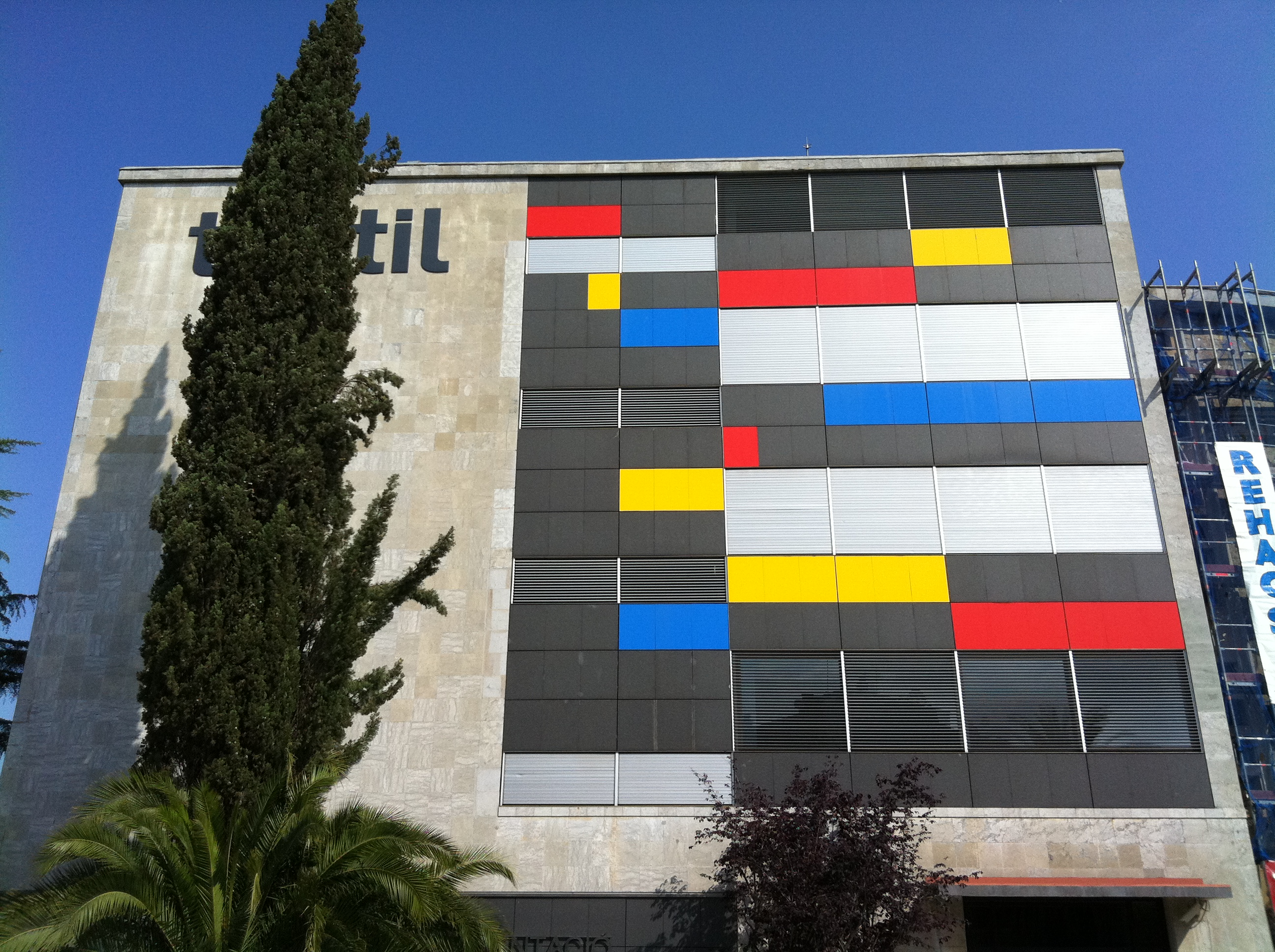
Façade of the Textile Museum and Documentation Centre

The Textile Museum and Documentation Centre (Catalan: Centre de Documentació i Museu Tèxtil) is a museum institution located in Terrassa, a city with an important textile tradition. Managed by a consortium consisting of Terrassa Town Council and Diputació de Barcelona (Barcelona Provincial Council), it presents a panoramic view of the different styles and techniques used all over the world in fabric making throughout history. It is part of the Barcelona Provincial Council Local Museum Network.

The documentation centre has an extensive library specialising in textile and fashion, a photographic archive and a rich fabric collection. The institution provides companies with different services and, through its training centre and various agreements with universities and educational institutions, it promotes contact and the exchange of knowledge among professionals in the sector. The museum has the IMATEX image bank, through which companies and individuals can access the museum's collection, which basically consists of clothing and fabric samples, especially from the Mediterranean area, from the first centuries of the Early Modern period up to the present day. There are collections from China and India and a small collection of samples from the pre-Columbian Americas. The museum also has a fabric restoration service and a lecture hall.

The museum's extensive collection, with over 20,000 representative pieces of textile history from around the world, is presented in different temporary monographic exhibitions, lasting between ten and twelve months in the Modernisme area on the first floor, and two to three years on the second floor.
