= Cardadeu Tomàs Balvey Museum-Archive =

Museum of Pharmacy in Barcelona

Coordinates: 41°38′16.79″N 2°21′17.69″E

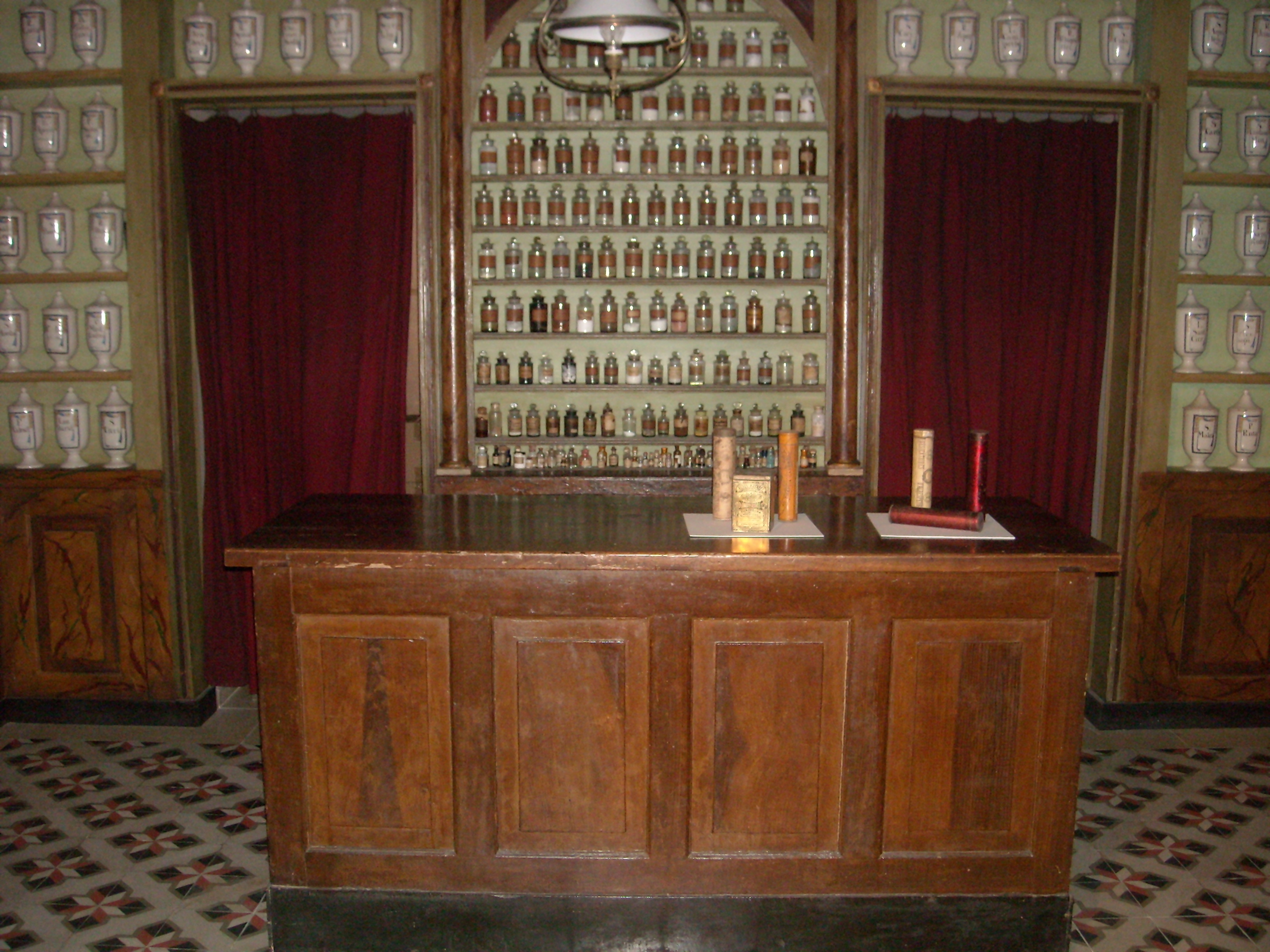
Original furniture of the old Balvey pharmacy

The Cardadeu Tomàs Balvey Museum-Archive (Catalan: Museu-Arxiu Tomàs Balvey), in Cardedeu, Vallès Oriental, is organised around the legacy of Tomàs Balvey i Bas (1865–1954), the last of a line of apothecaries in Cardedeu. The theme of the museum is based on the pharmacy and its pharmacist, focusing on the world of illness, remedies and health. The Museum-Archive is part of the Barcelona Provincial Council Local Museum Network and of the Catalan Pharmacy Museum Network.

== Exhibition ==
The most iconic element of the Museum-Archive is the old Balvey pharmacy itself, with the original furniture from 1812; more than 200 Empire style pharmacy jars which still hold the original contents; and the shop instruments: Flasks, stills, mortars, etc. In addition to the exhibition, there is a botanical garden with regional vegetation and medicinal herbs that would typically be found in a pharmacist’s garden. The museum collection also includes ethnological, archaeological and decorative materials, as well as a collection of 10th–14th century parchments and documents related to the history of Cardedeu.
