= Museu Comarcal de Manresa =

Coordinates: 41°43′29.03″N 1°49′49.75″E

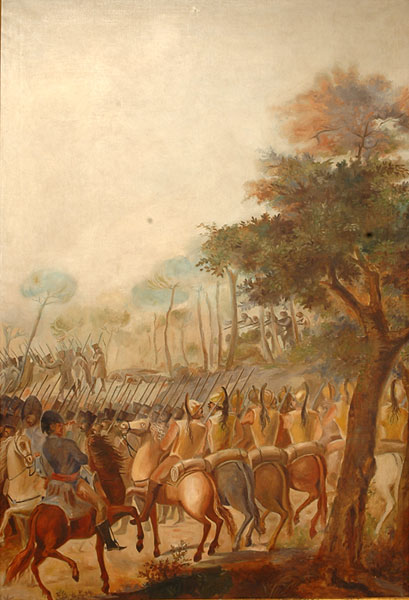
Atac dels guerrillers catalans als cuirassers francesos de l'avantguarda de la divisió del general Schwarz, painting by Francesc Cuixart exposed at the Museu Comarcal de Manresa

The Museu Comarcal de Manresa (Manresa Regional Museum) is a pluridisciplinary museum created on 2 September 1896 in Manresa and currently located in the old elementary school of Sant Ignasi (Saint Ignatius). It is part of the Barcelona Provincial Council Local Museum Network.

== Collection ==
The Manresa Regional Museum is a pluridisciplinary museum. Medieval ceramics painted in green and purple from the 14th century, polychrome carvings from the Baroque period of the 17th and 18th centuries, a fine archaeological sampling of objects from the Neolithic Period up to Romanisation and different religious objects from the 10th and 16th century. There is also a space dedicated to modern and contemporary art with an impressive collection of dioramas and paintings by Josep Mestres Cabanes, set designer for the Gran Teatre del Liceu, and paintings and engravings by Alfred Figueras.

== The building ==
The old elementary school of Sant Ignasi (Saint Ignatius) is a large, fortified square building with a spacious Neoclassical-style cloister at its centre. It was built by the Jesuits in the middle of the 18th century around the medieval hospital of Santa Llúcia (Saint Lucy).
