= Montmeló Municipal Museum =

Coordinates: 41°33′08.7″N 2°14′59″E

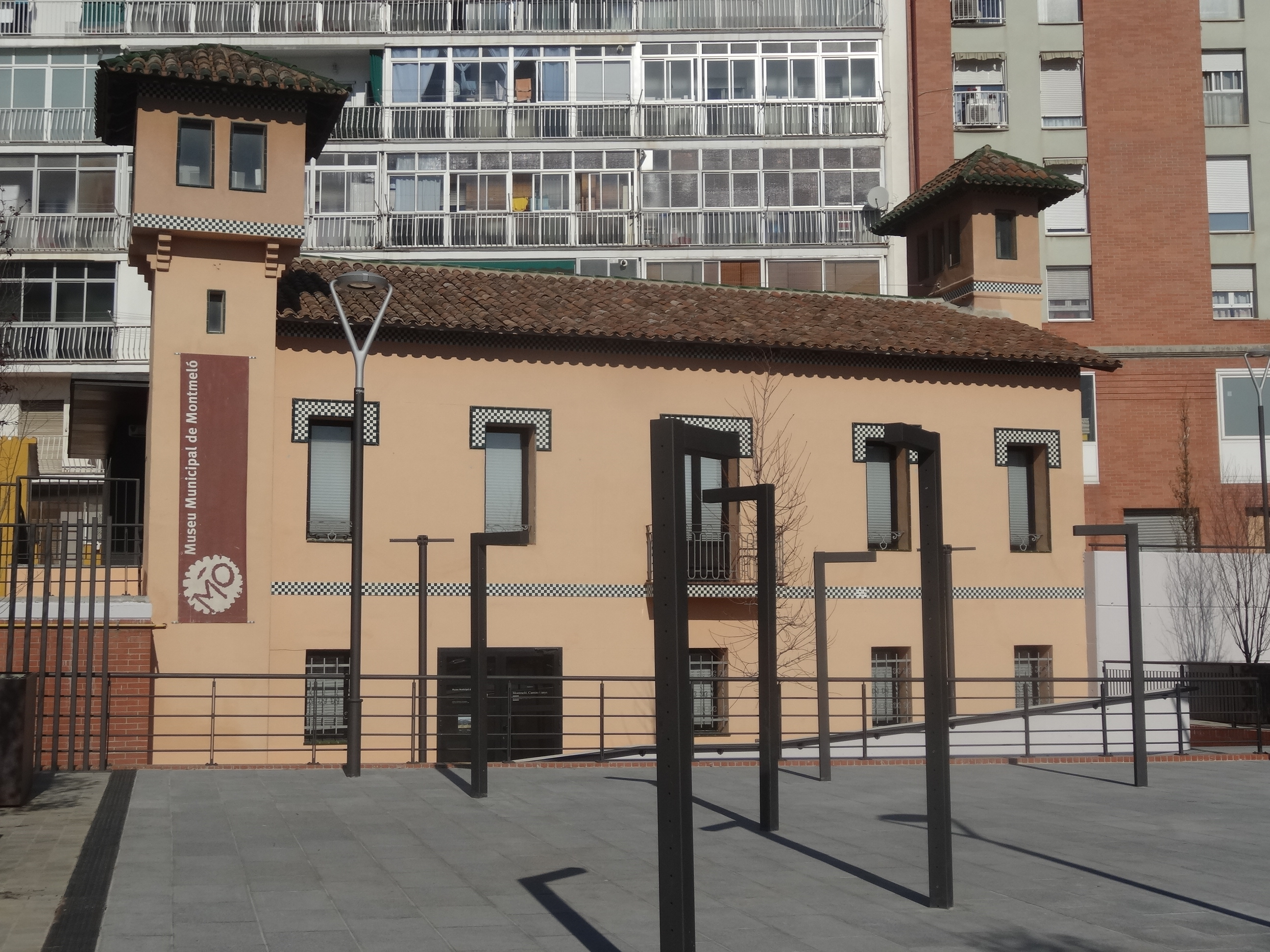
Can Caballé. Montmeló Municipal Museum.

The Montmeló Municipal Museum is a museum in the town of Montmeló, Catalonia, Spain. The museum is located in an old manor house, Can Caballé, which was built around 1920. In 1987, the town council bought the building and in 1996 approved its refurbishment as the home of the future museum, which opened in 1998. The Museum is part of the Barcelona Provincial Council Local Museum Network.

== Permanent exhibition ==
The permanent exhibition presents, under the title Montmeló, camins i anys (Montmeló, pathways and years), the historic evolution of the town within the context of El Vallès and Catalonia. In the exhibition modules visitors can see remnants of the Neolithic, Iberian, Roman and Medieval periods. These modules are structured around the collection of archaeological materials that Ignasi Cantarell loaned to the Montmeló Municipal Museum in 1998. In the medieval module, there are also Romanesque murals, of which the local church of Santa Maria de Montmeló is custodian.
