= Casa de la Festa Major de Vilafranca del Penedès =

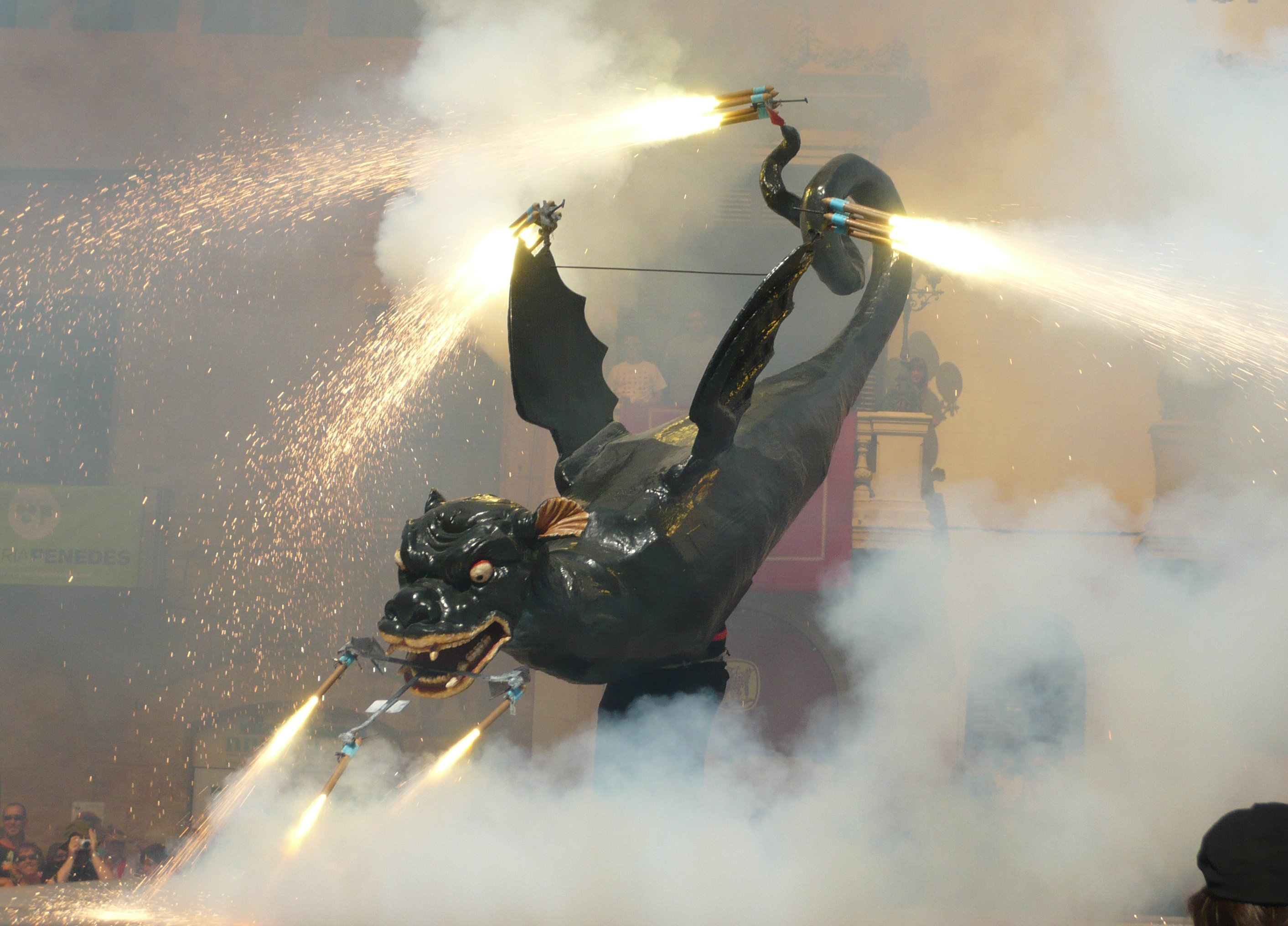
Bestiary in Vilafranca del Penedès town festival

The Casa de la Festa Major de Vilafranca del Penedès (Vilafranca del Penedès Town Festival Centre), located in the old chicken and giblets market, is a space that gathers together the rich folklore of the Vilafranca del Penedès town festival (Catalan: festa major), held between 28 August and 3 September, to honour the feast day of Sant Fèlix (Saint Felix). Municipally owned, it is part of the Barcelona Provincial Council Local Museum Network.

== The building ==
Classified as an industrial Art Nouveau building, the old chicken and giblets market was the work of Vilafranca architect Santiago Güell; it was built in 1911 and renovated in 1927. Since 1987, this space has had two functions: to archive and store the folkloric heritage related to the Vilafranca town festival and to serve as a museum to disseminate said heritage.

== Exhibition ==
The Town Festival Centre exhibits the typical dances of the Vilafranca town festival, or festa major, many of which are medieval in origin and related to the different guilds and collectives, as well as the origin of the bestiary, the dragon and the oldest pair of giants, the castellers, or human castles, and all the dances and music that are part of the festivities.
