= Montcada Municipal Museum =

Museum in Montcada

Coordinates: 41°29′12.53″N 2°11′17.01″E

The aim of the Montcada Municipal Museum (Catalan: Museu Municipal de Montcada), founded in 1982 and housed in the old Casa de la Vila de Montcada i Reixac, Catalonia (Spain) since 1987, aims to recover, conserve and protect local heritage. Its collection includes findings from the Iberian settlement of Les Maleses, in the Catalan Coastal Range in the outskirts of Montcada. The museum also has a permanent exhibition divided into five areas: the environment, mineralogy and palaeontology; prehistory; the Iberian world; medieval and modern Montcada; and, finally, contemporary Montcada. The Museum is part of the Barcelona Provincial Council Local Museum Network.

== Gallery ==
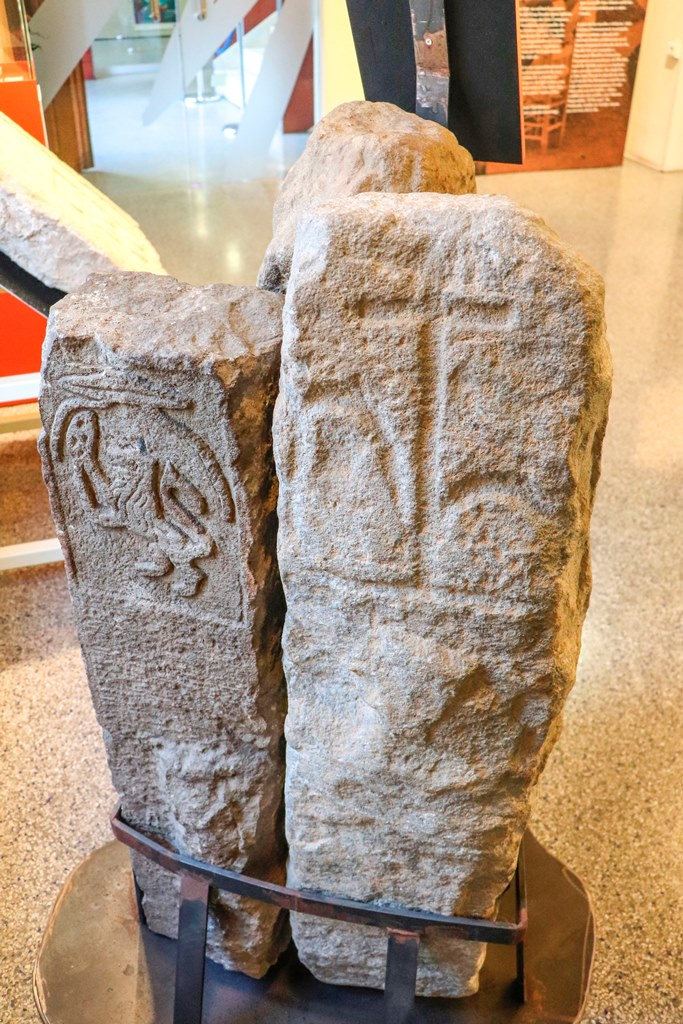
Milestones from the area of Montcada i Reixac

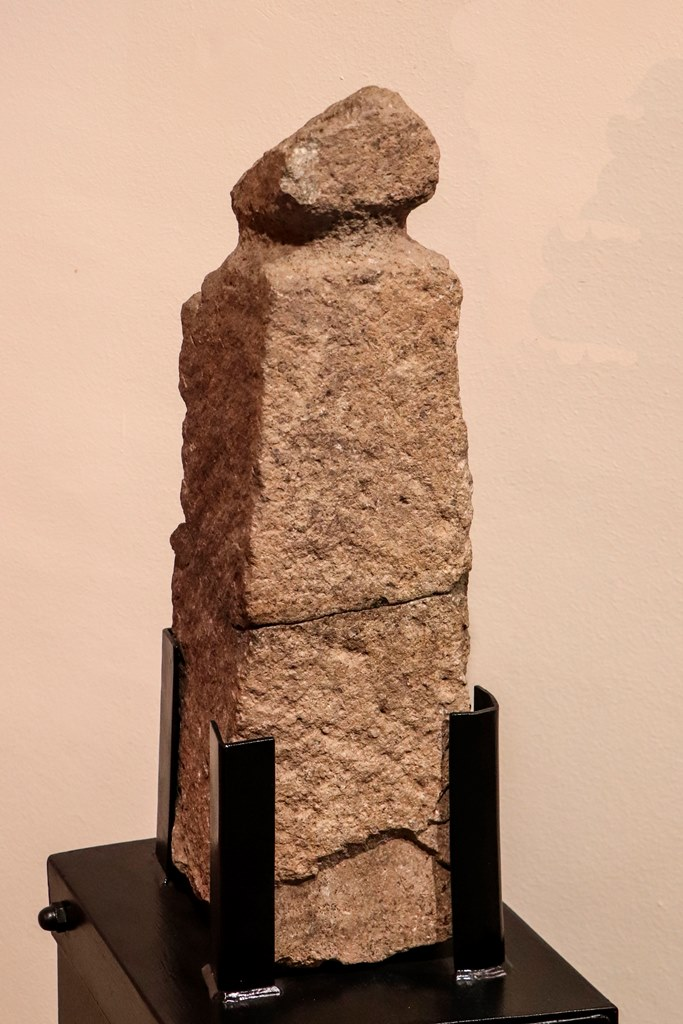
Baetylus from the Iberian settlement of Les Maleses

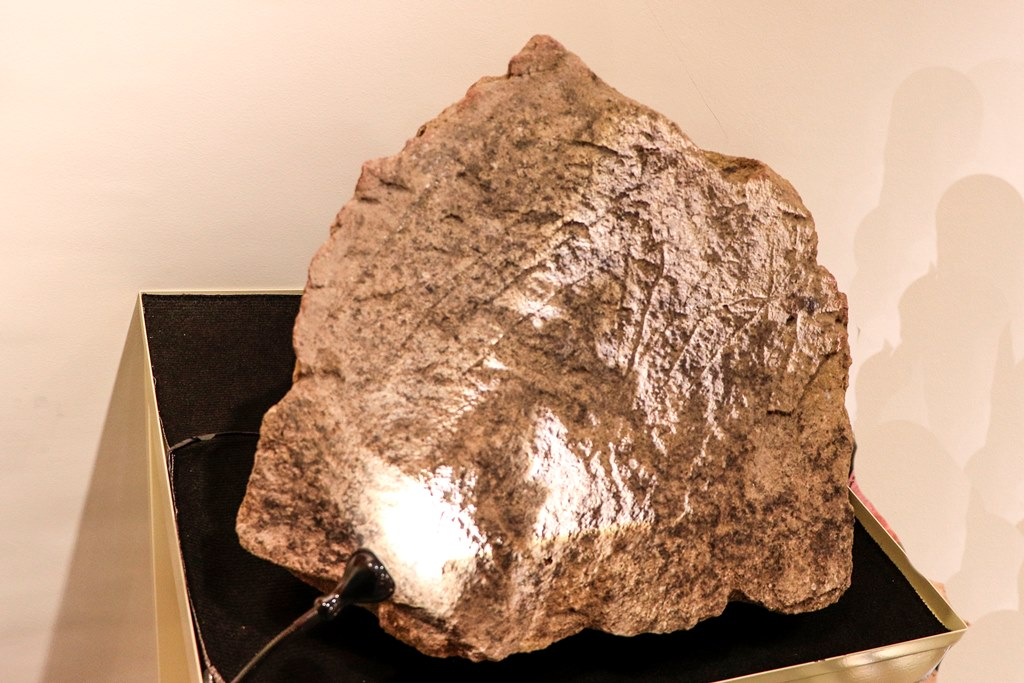
Carved stone from the Iberian settlement of Les Maleses
