= Molí d'en Rata Heritage Interpretation Centre =

Museum in Ripollet, Catalonia, Spain

Coordinates: 41°29′57.57″N 2°9′10.16″E

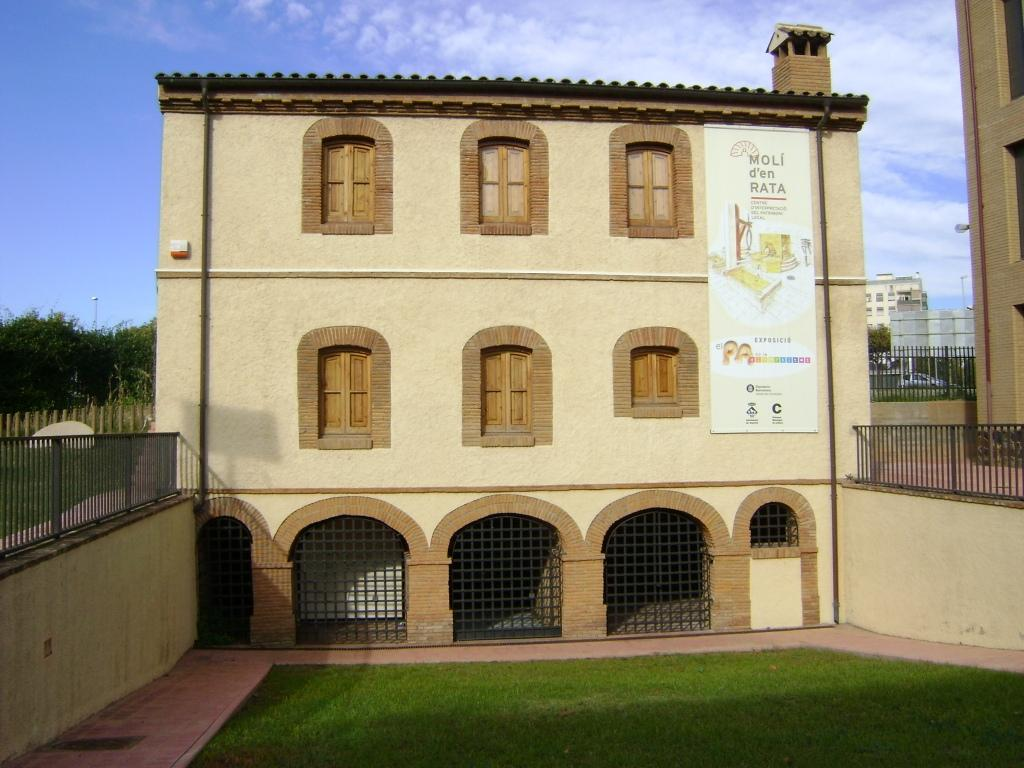
Exterior view of the Molí d'en Rata and the Heritage Interpretation Centre

The Molí d'en Rata Heritage Interpretation Centre (Catalan: Centre d'Interpretació del Patrimoni Molí d'en Rata), in Ripollet (Vallès Occidental), is a municipal facility dedicated to research into and the conservation, management and diffusion of the heritage of Ripollet. It encompasses two areas: the Molí d'en Rata (En Rata mill), one of El Vallès Occidental’s last operational flour mills, and the Heritage Interpretation Centre, a newly constructed building with two exhibition rooms: one for the permanent exhibition and the other for temporary exhibitions. It is part of the Barcelona Provincial Council Local Museum Network.

== Permanent exhibition ==
The interpretation centre's permanent exhibition includes three areas:

- El pa de la diversitat (The bread of diversity):

This area is part of the visit to the old En Rata flourmill and explains how grain was changed into flour in a hydraulic flourmill.

- Protagonistes: ripolletencs que deixen petjada (Leaders: people from Ripollet who left their mark):

This area recognises seven people born or connected with Ripollet who made their mark in their profession beyond Catalonia's borders: a painter, a sculptor and painter, a sculptor, a castanet performer, a tenor, a basketball player and a scientist.

- Ripollet i la mesura del temps (Ripollet and the test of time):

The exhibition explains the workings of the old bell tower clock of Sant Esteve de Ripollet.
