= Archaeological and Palaeontological Museum – El Toll Caves, Moià =

Archaeological and Palaeontological Museum – El Toll Caves
- Coves del Toll
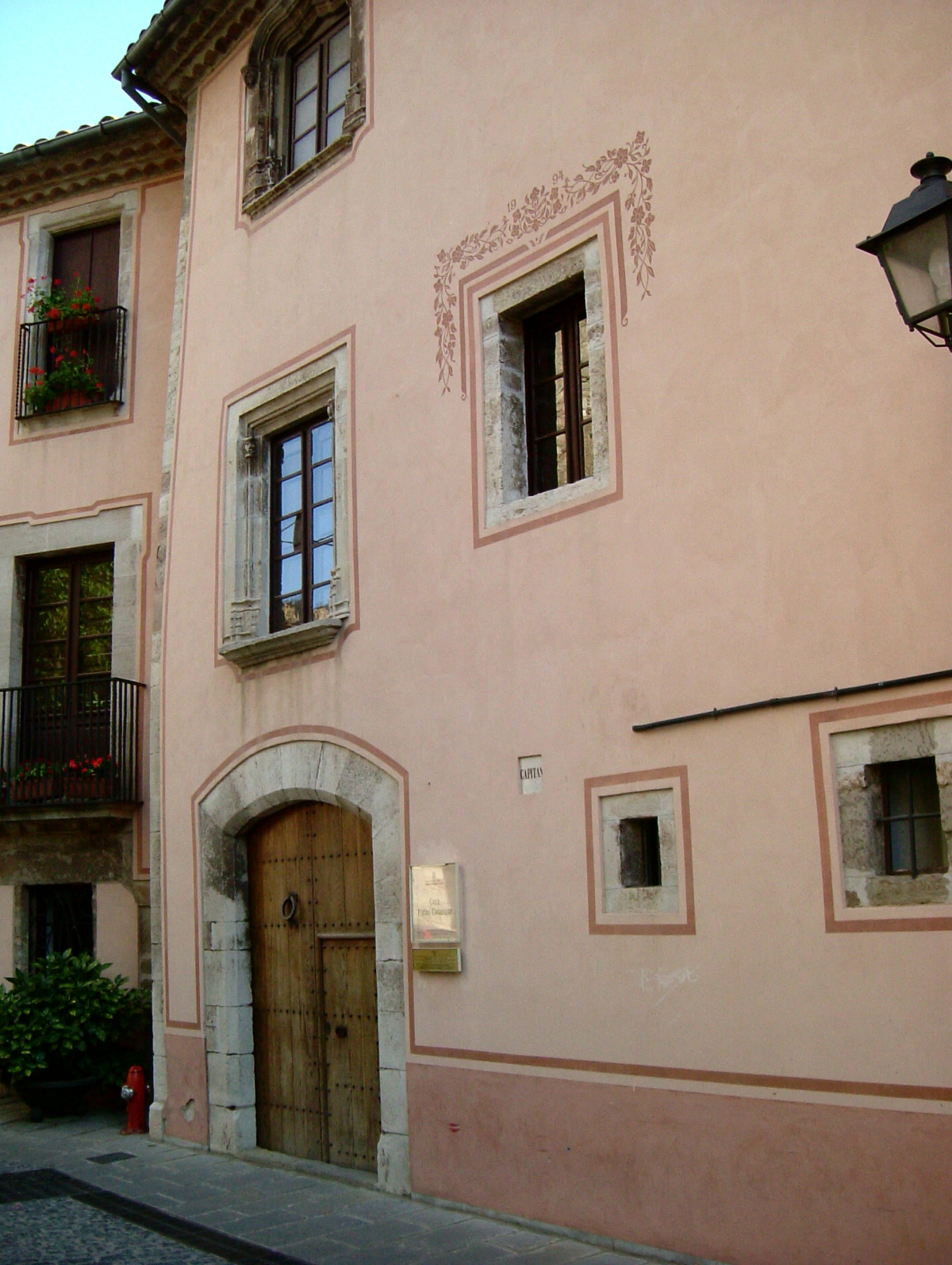
- Front of the museum
- Location: Moià (Catalonia)
- Coordinates: 41.811747°N 2.099°E
- Type: Archaeology museum
- Website: Coves del Toll

The central office of the Archaeological and Palaeontological Museum - El Toll Caves (Catalan: Museu Arqueològic i Paleontològic-Coves del Toll), in Moià (Bages), is located in the birthplace of Rafael Casanova, a building that the museum shares with the Rafael Casanova Birthplace-Museum, which depends on the History Museum of Catalonia. The museum collection includes archaeological collections from the El Toll caves, a complex comprising four caverns and a chasm that were created during the Pliocene Epoch into the Quaternary Period and, to a lesser extent, other archaeological sites in the region. Among the museum's collection, of particular note are the remains of Quaternary fauna (bears, lions, rhinoceros, hippopotamus, etc.) and signs of human presence from the Middle Palaeolithic. The museum is part of the Barcelona Provincial Council Local Museum Network and also manages the El Toll caves prehistoric park.
