= Museum of Leather Artistry. A. Colomer Munmany Collection =

Leather museum in Spain

Coordinates: 41°55′55.42″N 2°15′09.12″E

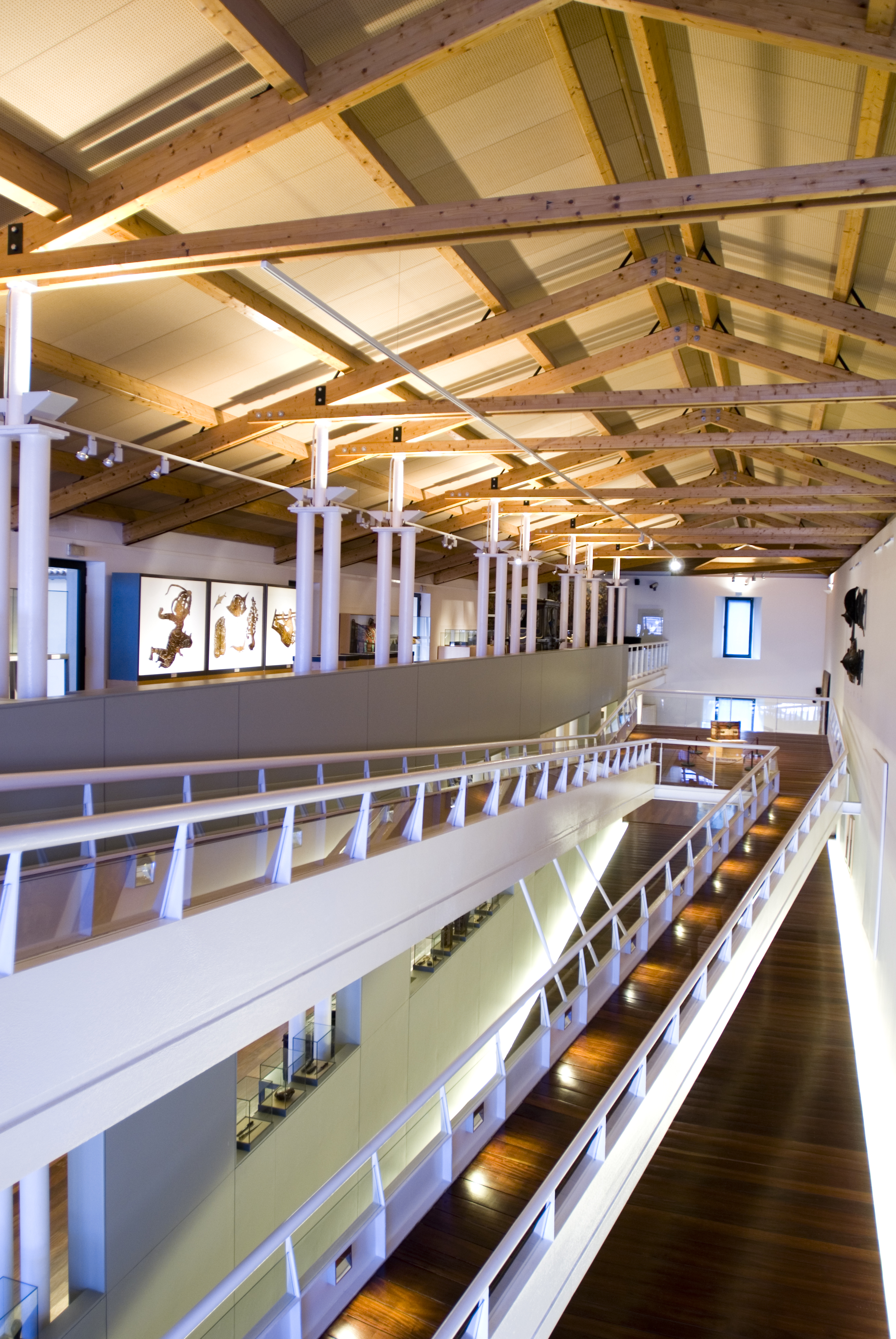
Interior of the Museum

The Museum of Leather Artistry (Catalan: Museu de l'Art de la Pell), in Vic, is a museum dedicated to the decorative and applied leather arts, founded in 1996 and located in the refurbished convent of El Carme. It exhibits the collection of Vic tanner Andreu Colomer i Munmany, focusing on objects made totally or partially of leather, such as trunks, room separators, altar frontals, chest tables, stools, saddles, masks or shadow puppets. Of particular interest is the guadamassil technique (polychrome- or gold-embossed leather) and cordovan applied to boxes and chests.

It is part of the Barcelona Provincial Council Local Museum Network.
