= Vilassar de Mar Municipal Museum =

Coordinates: 41.5076601°N 2.3902070°E

The Vilassar de Mar Municipal Museum (Catalan: Museu Municipal de Vilassar de Mar) is a local museum in Vilassar de Mar comprising two facilities: The Marina Museum, focusing on local history and placing special emphasis on its connection with the nautical world, and the Monjo Museum, which tells the story behind the legacy of Vilassar de Mar sculptor Enric Monjo.

The Vilassar de Mar Municipal Museum is part of the Barcelona Provincial Council Local Museum Network.

== Marina Museum ==
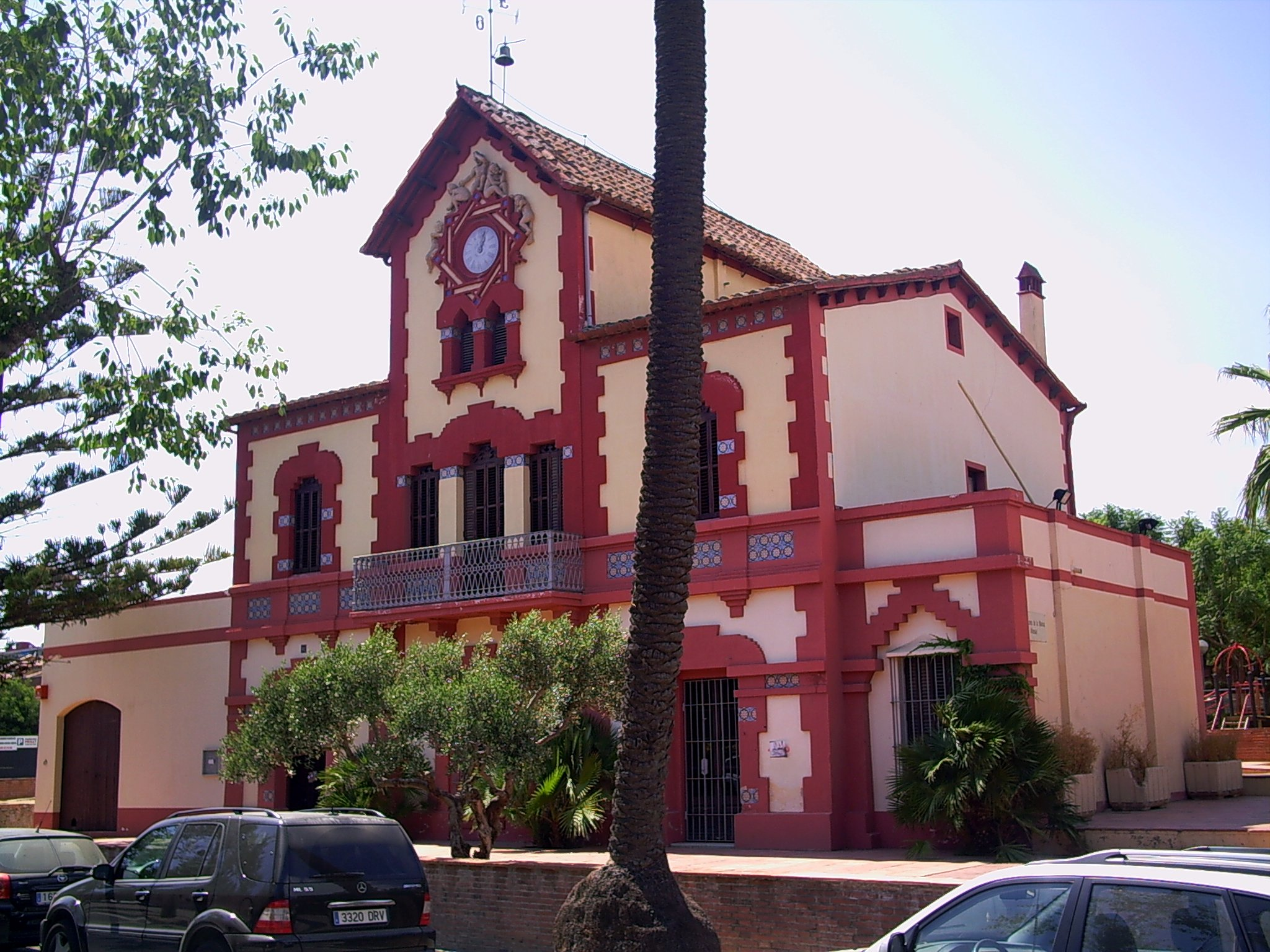
Façade of the Marine Museum

The Marina Museum (Catalan: Museu de la Marina)is located in an Art Nouveau building constructed in 1902 by architect Eduard Ferrés i Puig and known as the Sènia del Rellotge.

Its collections explain the origins and better part of Vilassar de Mar's history, focusing in particular on fishing and transatlantic sailing. Its collections include examples of the area's different fishing arts, tools of the old naval dockyards and nautical instruments, as well as an extensive cartographic collection.

== Monjo Museum ==
The Monjo Museum, also known as the Enric Monjo Glyptotheque, is an art museum that compiles the sculpture collections that Enric Monjo donated to his hometown. Founded in 1971, the museum is located in an old inn dating back to the 17th century, which served as a resting place for travellers using the old highroad that linked Mataró to Barcelona and which later on served as Vilassar de Mar Town Hall between 1785 and 1962.
