= Rubí Municipal Museum =

Museum in Catalonia, Spain

Coordinates: 41°29′40.31″N 2°1′35.28″E

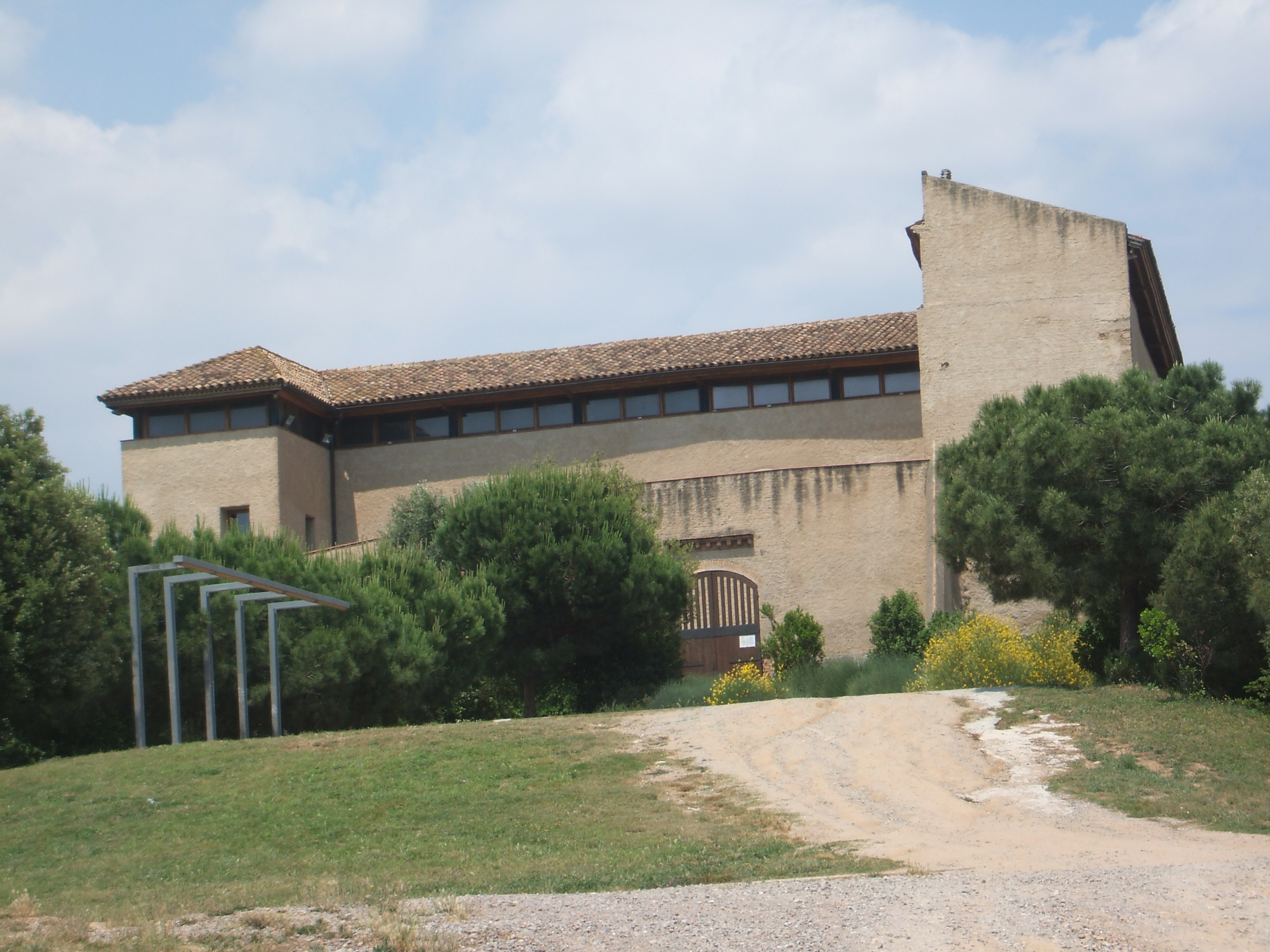
Façade of the Rubí Castle.

The Rubí Municipal Museum or El Castell-Urban Ecomuseum is a museum in Rubí (Vallès Occidental), Catalonia, Spain.

The museum is located in Rubí Castle, one of the most significant pieces of heritage in the city and which had various functions between the 13th and 20th centuries: a defensive point, a manor house and even a country house. Reopened as a museum in 1996, the facility is intended to preserve and disseminate heritage and traditional and popular culture, understood as the living and dynamic expression of a plural reality, and aims to construct a space for stable intercultural relations in which the cultural and social diversity of the city is reflected. The Museum is part of the Barcelona Provincial Council Local Museum Network.
