= Palau Foundation =

Coordinates: 41°34′15.85″N 2°31′39.04″E

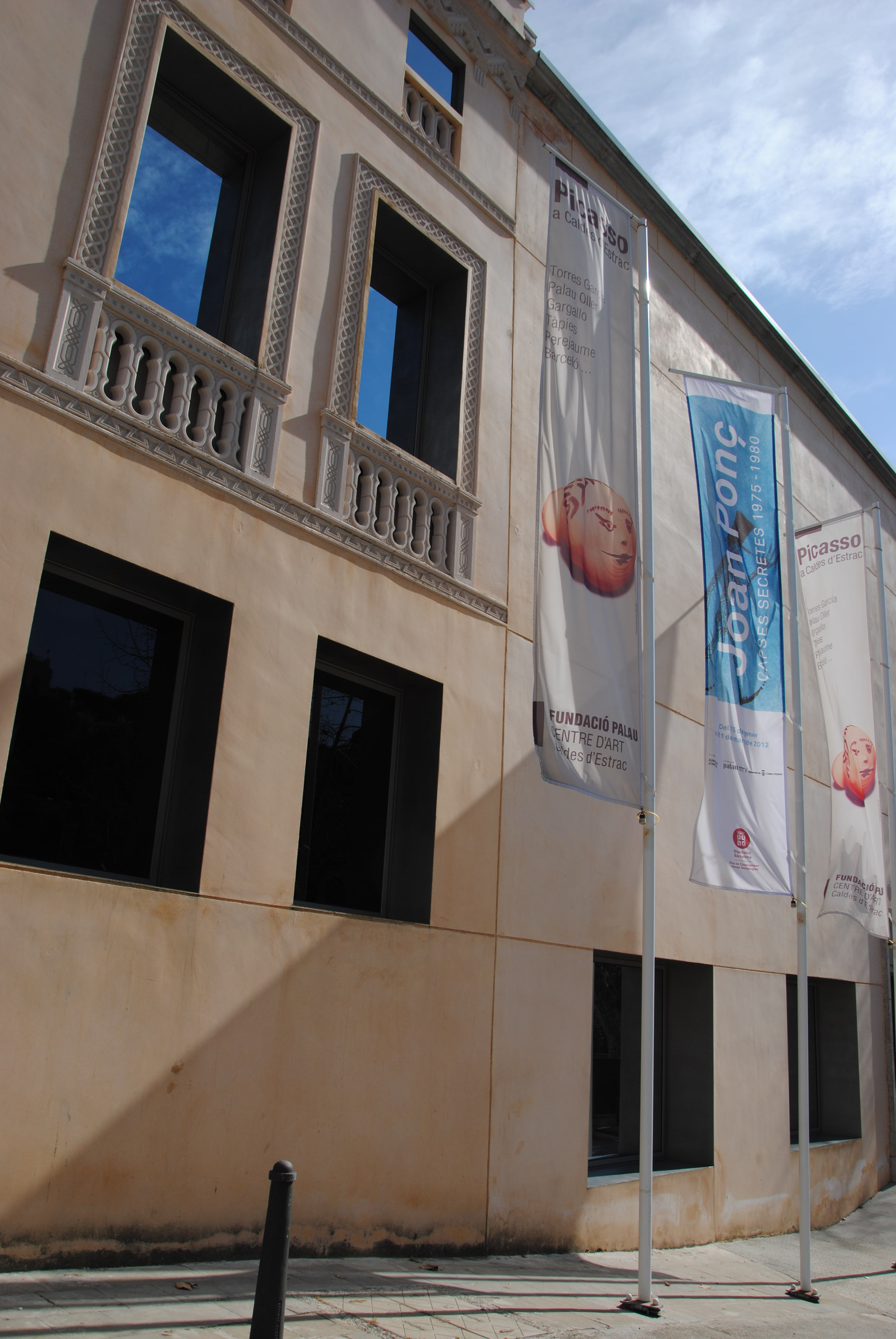
Façade of the Palau Foundation

The Palau Foundation (Catalan: Fundació Palau) is an art exhibition centre in the centre of Caldes d'Estrac, in the region of El Maresme (Catalonia). It was opened in May 2003, to exhibit and disseminate the art collection that had been compiled by Josep Palau i Fabre, as well as its archives and library. Of particular importance is its archive and bibliographical collection on Pablo Picasso. The Palau Foundation is part of the Catalan Art Museums Network and 'Espais Escrits', the Catalan Literary Heritage Network.

== Permanent exhibition ==
The new exhibition of the permanent collection, divided into three rooms and opened on 24 October 2010, documents the relationships between Palau i Fabre and Picasso. It also provides information on the figure of Josep Palau i Oller, father of Palau i Fabre, painter, textile designer, toy designer and art collector.

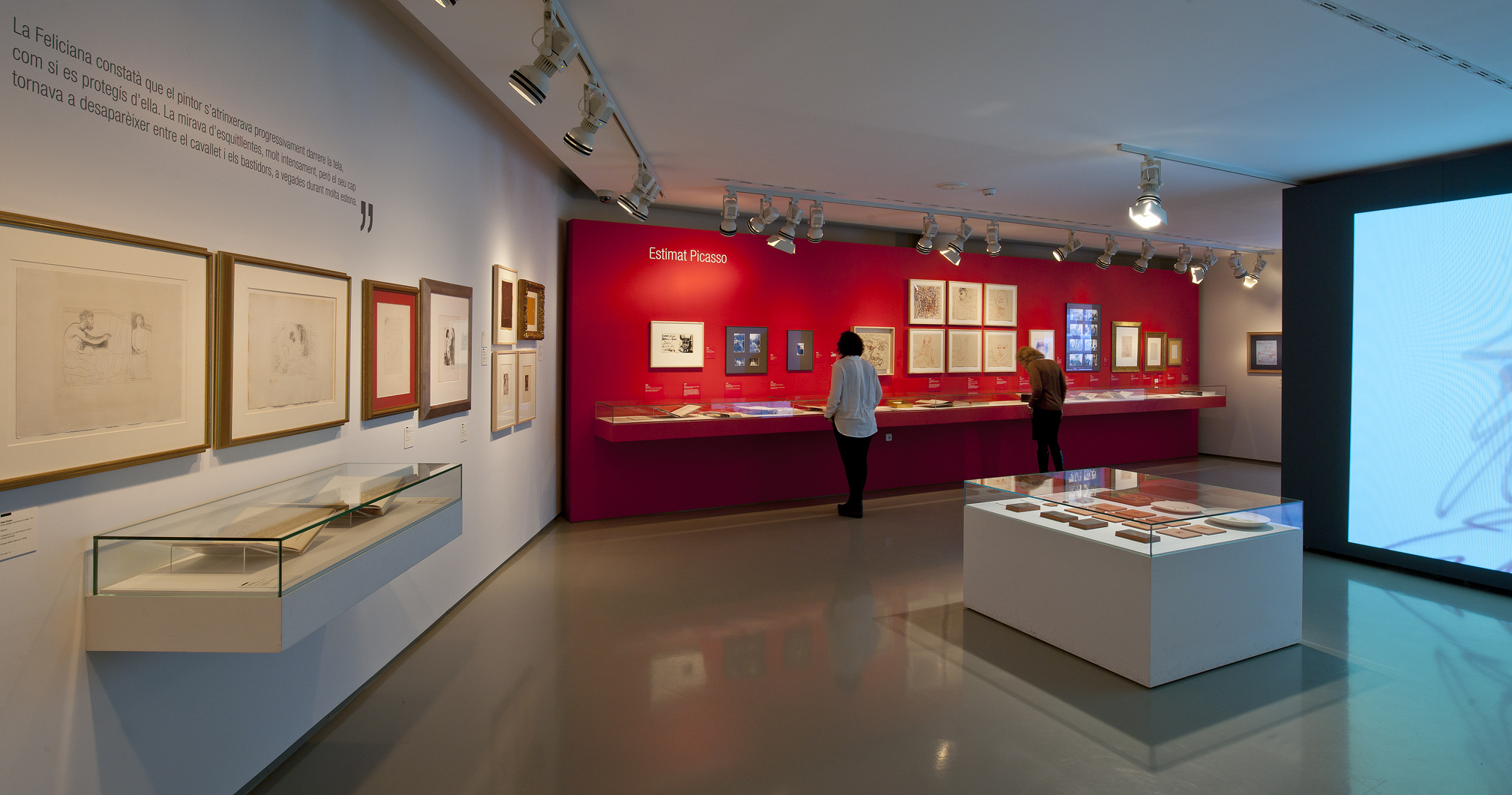
Sala Estimat Picasso

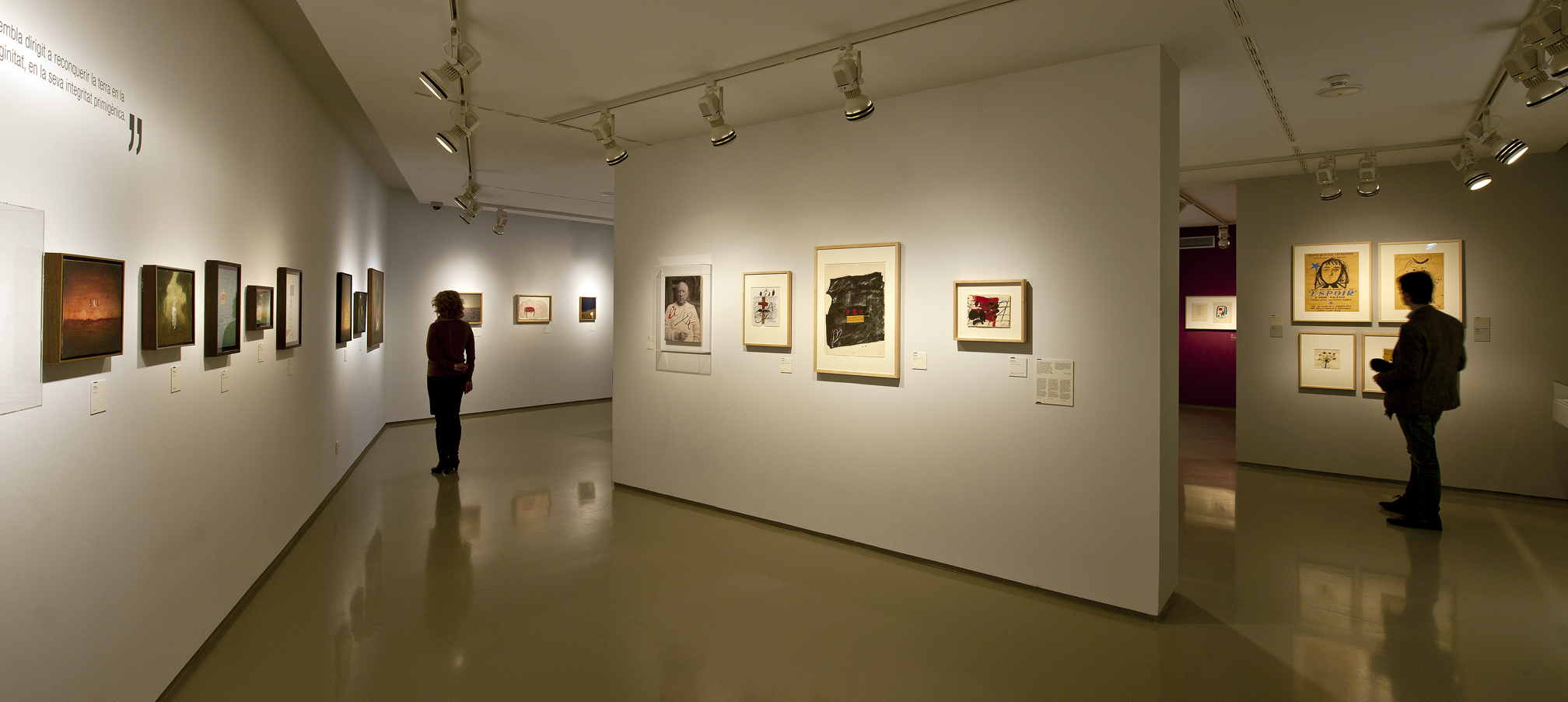
Sala en Defensa de l’Avantguarda

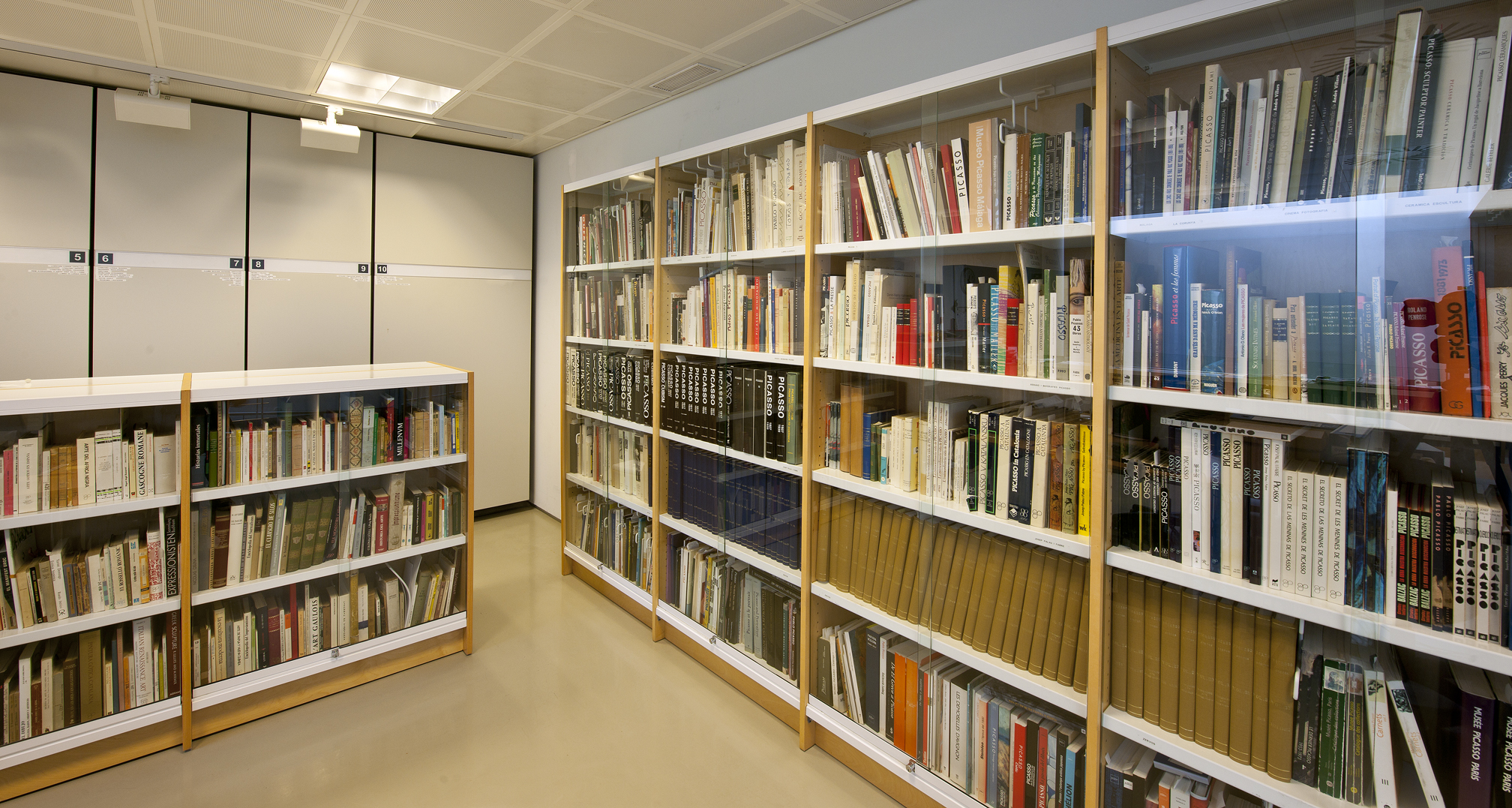
Library

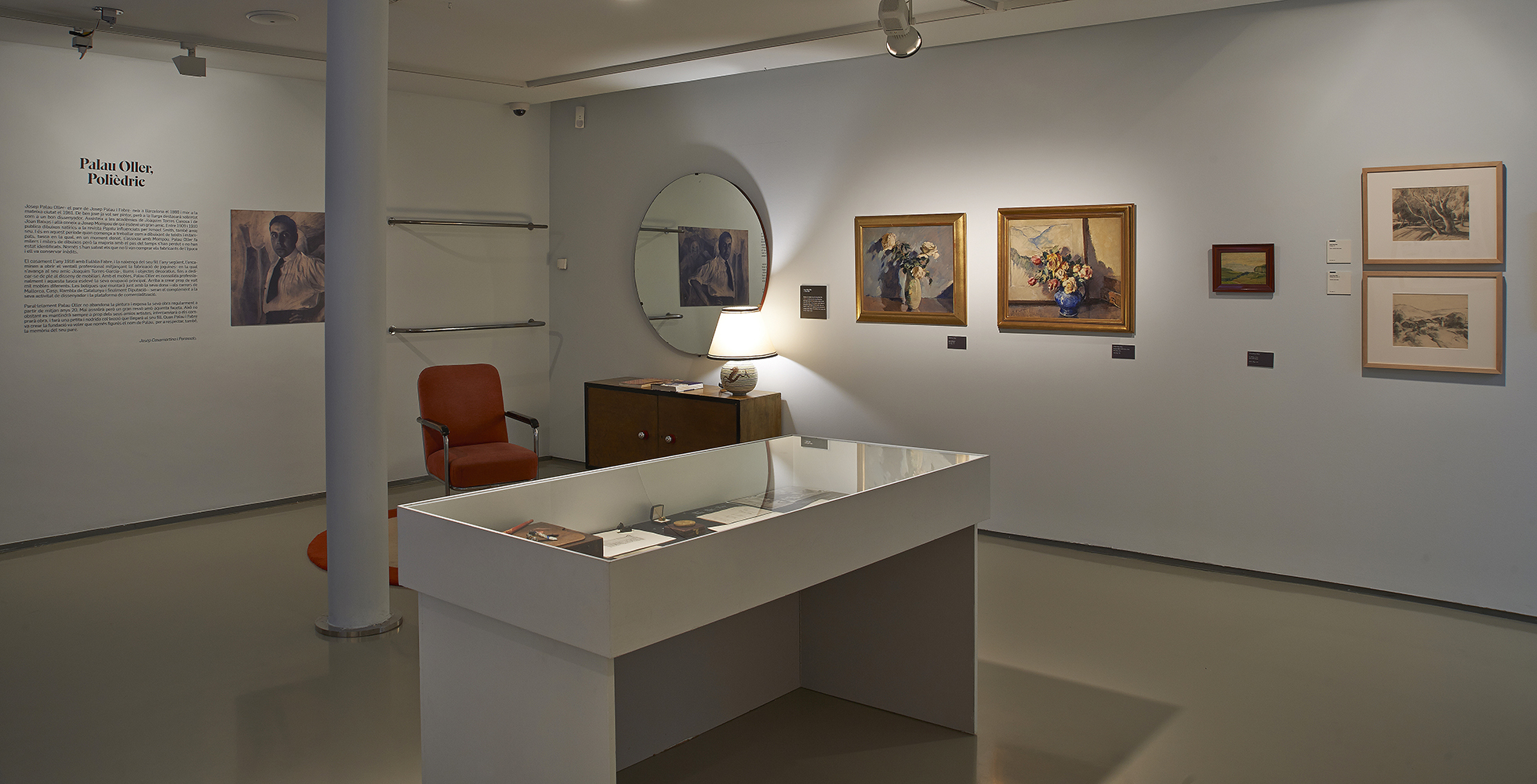
Sala Palau i Oller

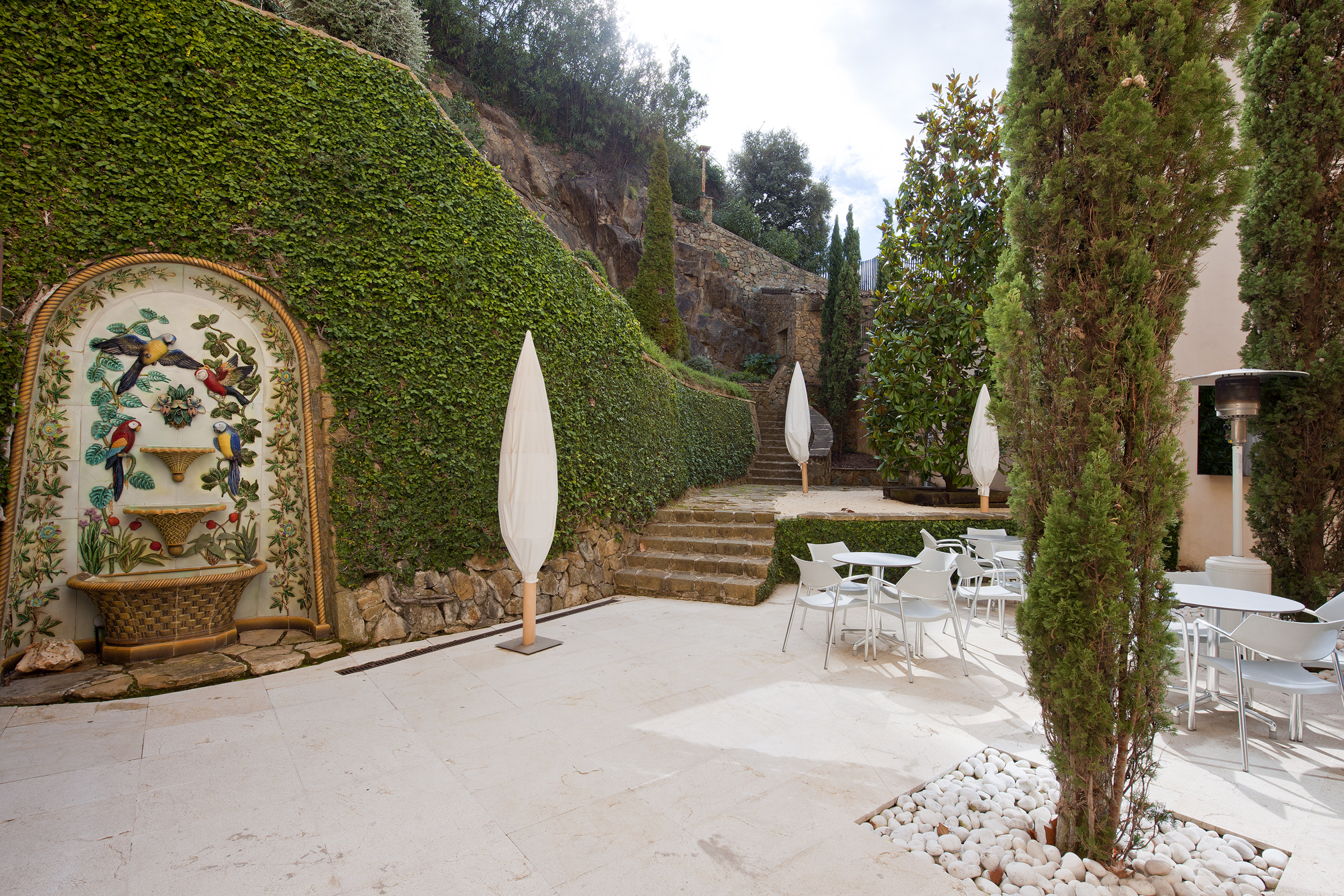
Patio
