= Calella Josep M. Codina i Bagué Municipal Archive Museum =

Museum in Catalonia, Spain

Coordinates: 41°36′46″N 2°39′26″E

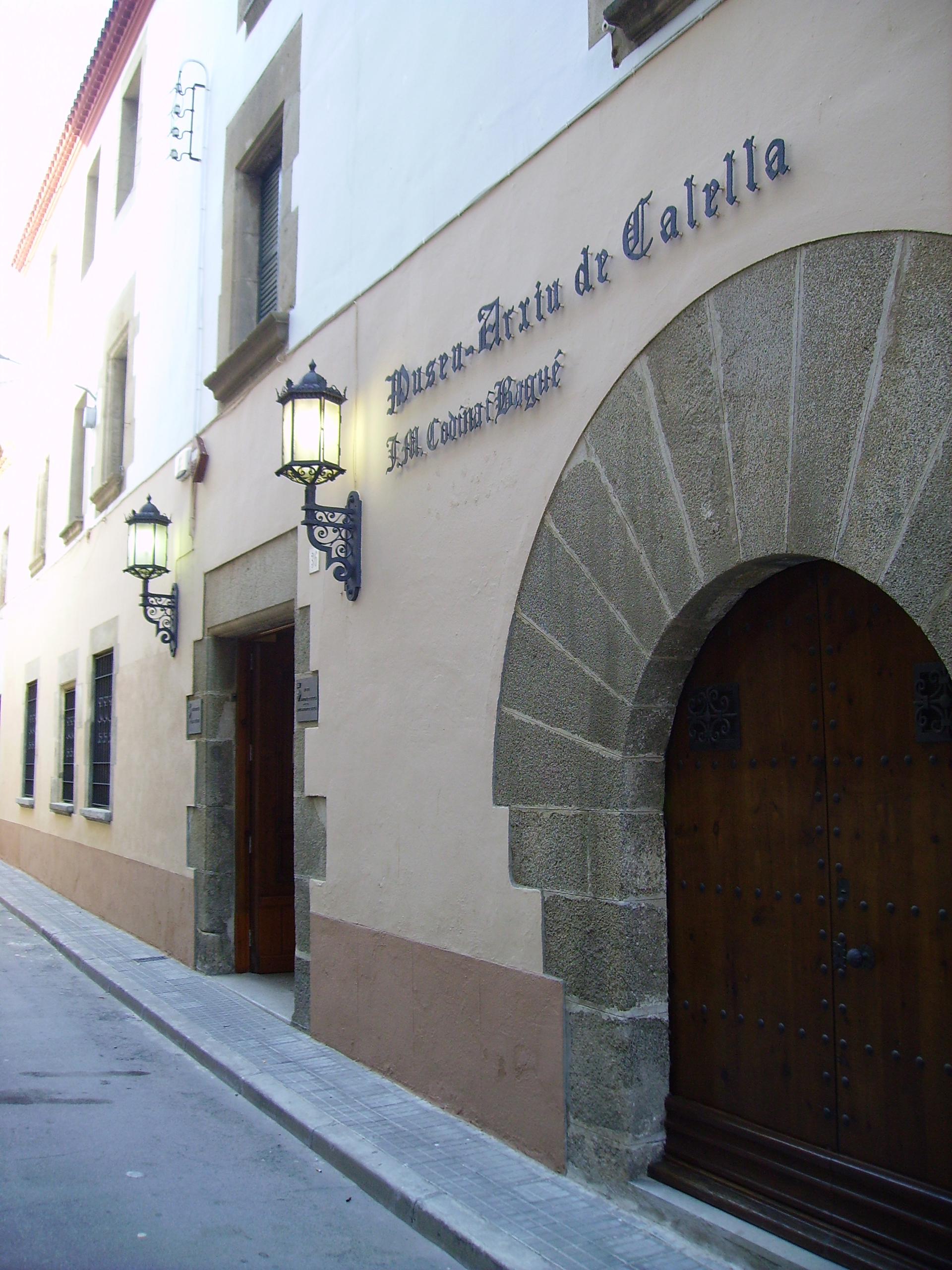
Front of the Museum

The Calella Josep Maria Codina i Bagué Municipal Archive Museum (Catalan: Museu Arxiu Municipal de Calella Josep Maria Codina i Bagué) is a municipal museum, located in a manor house from the 17th century, which is connected to the archive, located in a new building on Carrer Bartrina, Calella, by a large patio. The museum exhibits the tradition and works of various local artists.

It was founded in 1959, although it was not opened to the public until 1979. It takes special interest in the archive collection conserved at the Historic Archives, which were supported by donations from families from Calella, with parchments that date back to the 11th century and which allow visitors to retrace the path of the city's history from its origins.
