= Dionisio Baixeras Verdaguer =

Spanish painter (1862–1943)

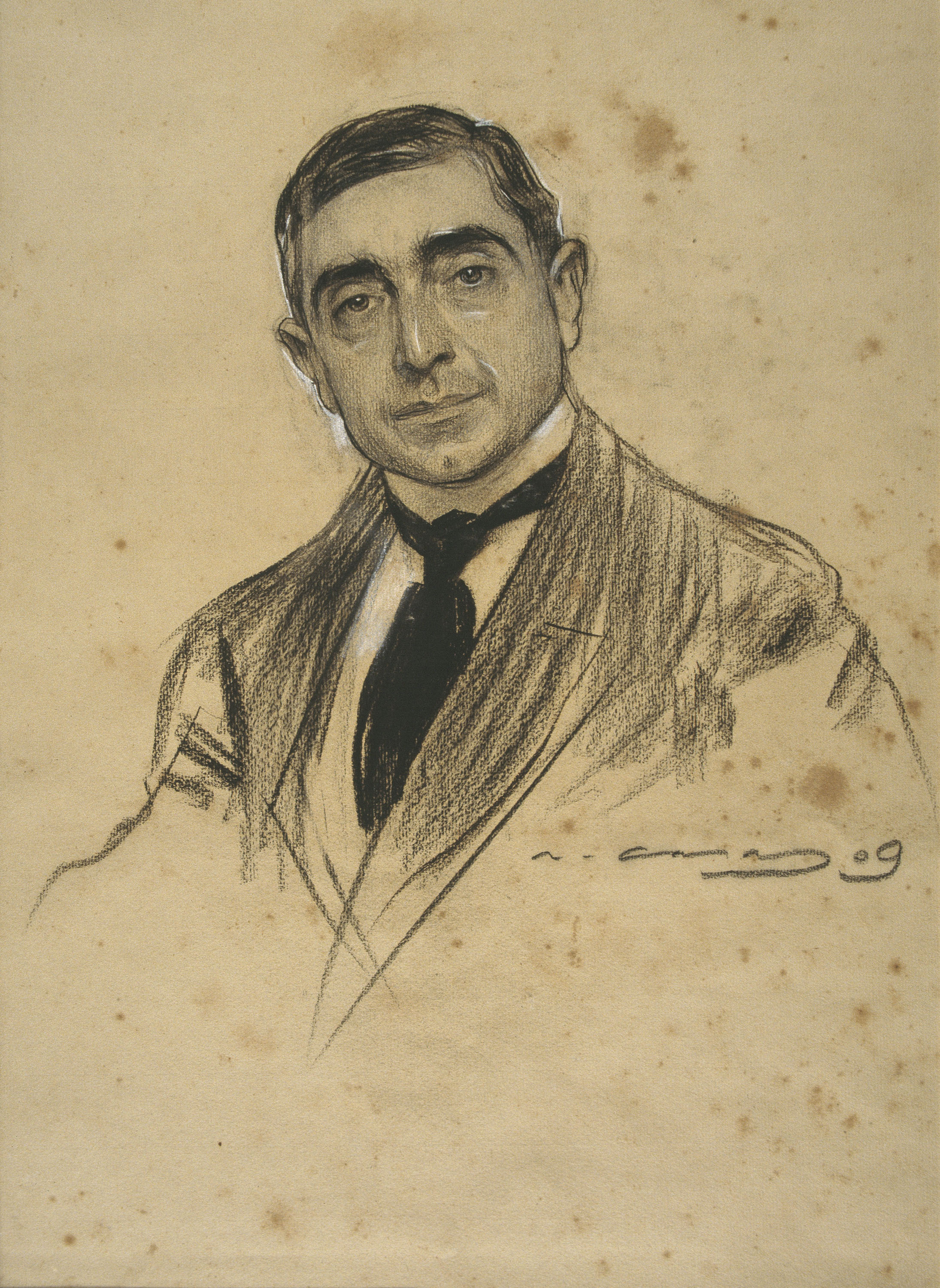
- Baixeras seen by Ramon Casas (MNAC)
- Born: Dionís Baixeras i Verdaguer; 23 November 1876; Barcelona, Catalunya, Spain
- Died: 9 September 1943 (aged 66); Barcelona
- Education: Martí Alsina and Antonio Caba
- Known for: Painter
- Movement: Orientalist

Dionís Baixeras i Verdaguer (1862–1943) was a naturalist Spanish artist from Barcelona, who specialized in oil on canvas and was noted for his realistic and detailed Orientalist and everyday life scenes.

== Early life ==
Baixeras was born in Barcelona in 1862.

== Career ==
Baixeras began studying at an early age at the La Lonja School of Fine Arts, where he was a pupil of Catalan painters such as Agustín Rigalt (1836-1899), Martí Alsina (1826-1894) and Antonio Caba (1838-1907).

He and his brothers, Juan and Jose Llimonas, were members of a group, which included painters and sculptors, known as the Cercle Artístic de Sant Lluc (Artistic Circle of San Lluc); an arts society formed in Barcelona in the early 1890s by brothers, Joan Llimona and Josep Llimona; Antoni Utrillo, Alexandre de Riquer and a group of artists who were followers of bishop Josep Torras i Bages. This circle also included the celebrated architects, Gaudí and Puig i Cadafalch.

At age 24 he moved for 4 years to Paris, where he frequented the countryside to make paintings. In Paris, he was impressed by the realism and naturalism of Jean-François Millet, Jules Bastien-Lepage and Pascal Dagnan-Bouveret, whose style would leave a lasting impression on the young artist. He then returned to Barcelona.

Baixeras exhibited often and with the help of Antonio Blanch, he sold many paintings. The everyday scenes he painted ensured that his work was popular, and he was commercially successful.

== Personal life ==
Baixeras was married.

== Work ==
His works have variously been described as Orientalist and Costumbrista.

His works hang in several museums including:

- Musée d'art et d'industrie de Roubaix, France.
- « Boatmen of Barcelona », (1886), MET, New York

His more well-known paintings include:

- Abd al-Rahman III Receiving the Ambassador at the Court of Cordoba, 1885
- Alphonse X, the Wise with his Collaborators
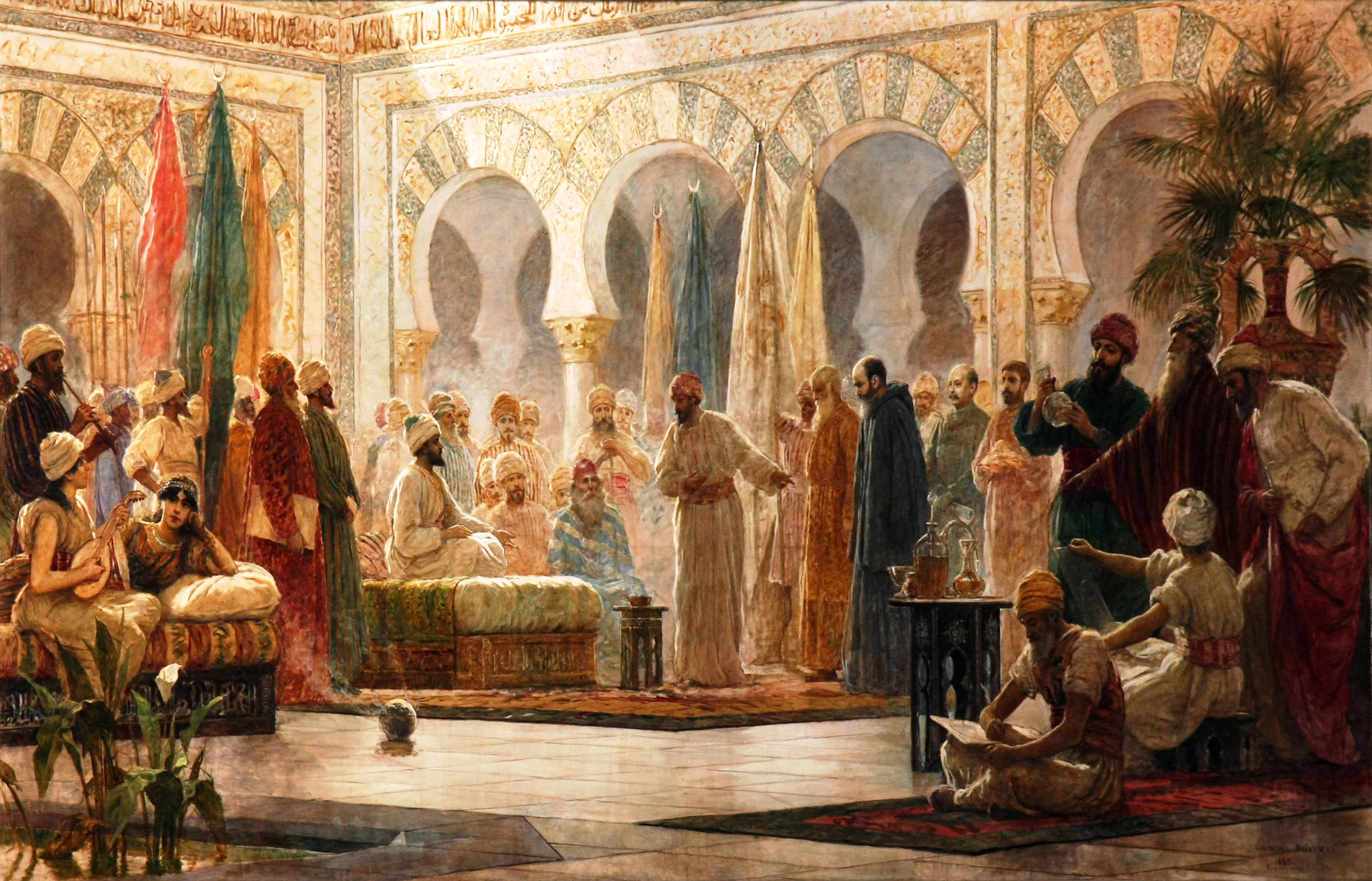
Caliphate of Cordoba

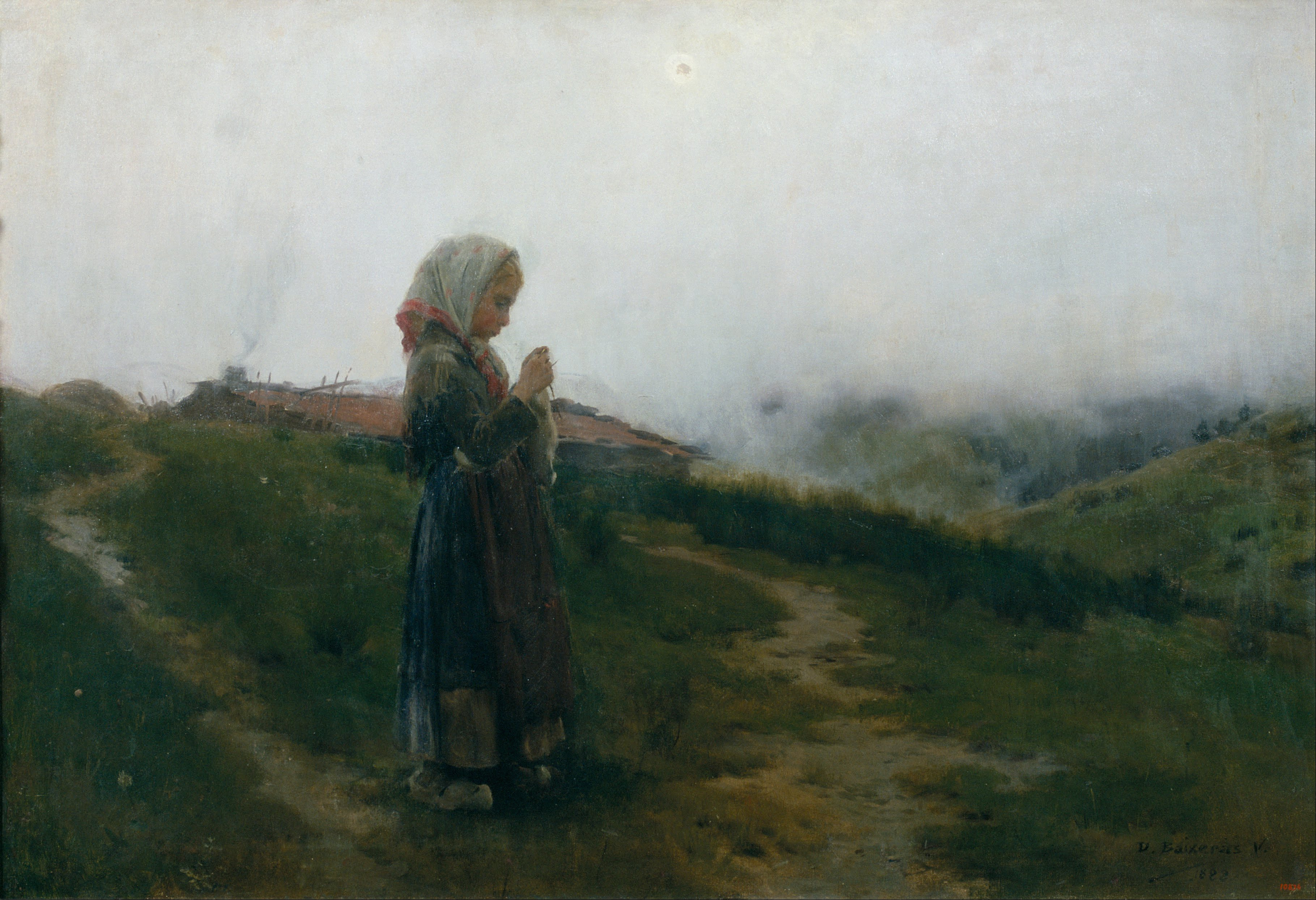
Knitting, 1888, Museu Nacional d'Art de Catalunya

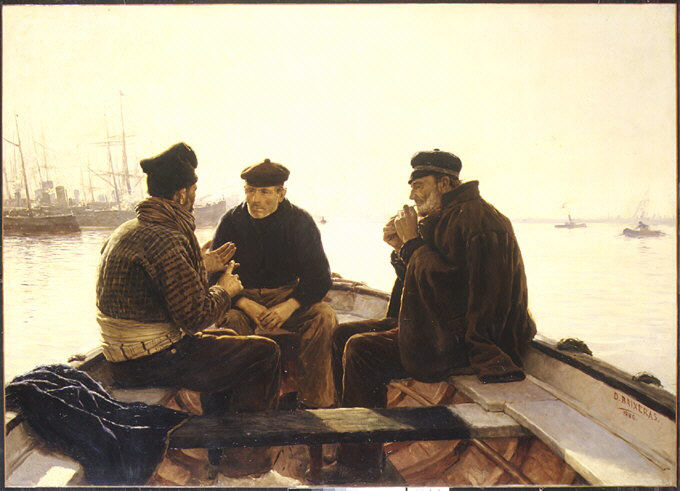
Boatmen of Barcelona, 1886

Young fisherman (Roubaix)

== See also ==
- List of Orientalist artists
- Orientalism
