= Desolation (Llimona) =

Sculpture by Josep Llimona

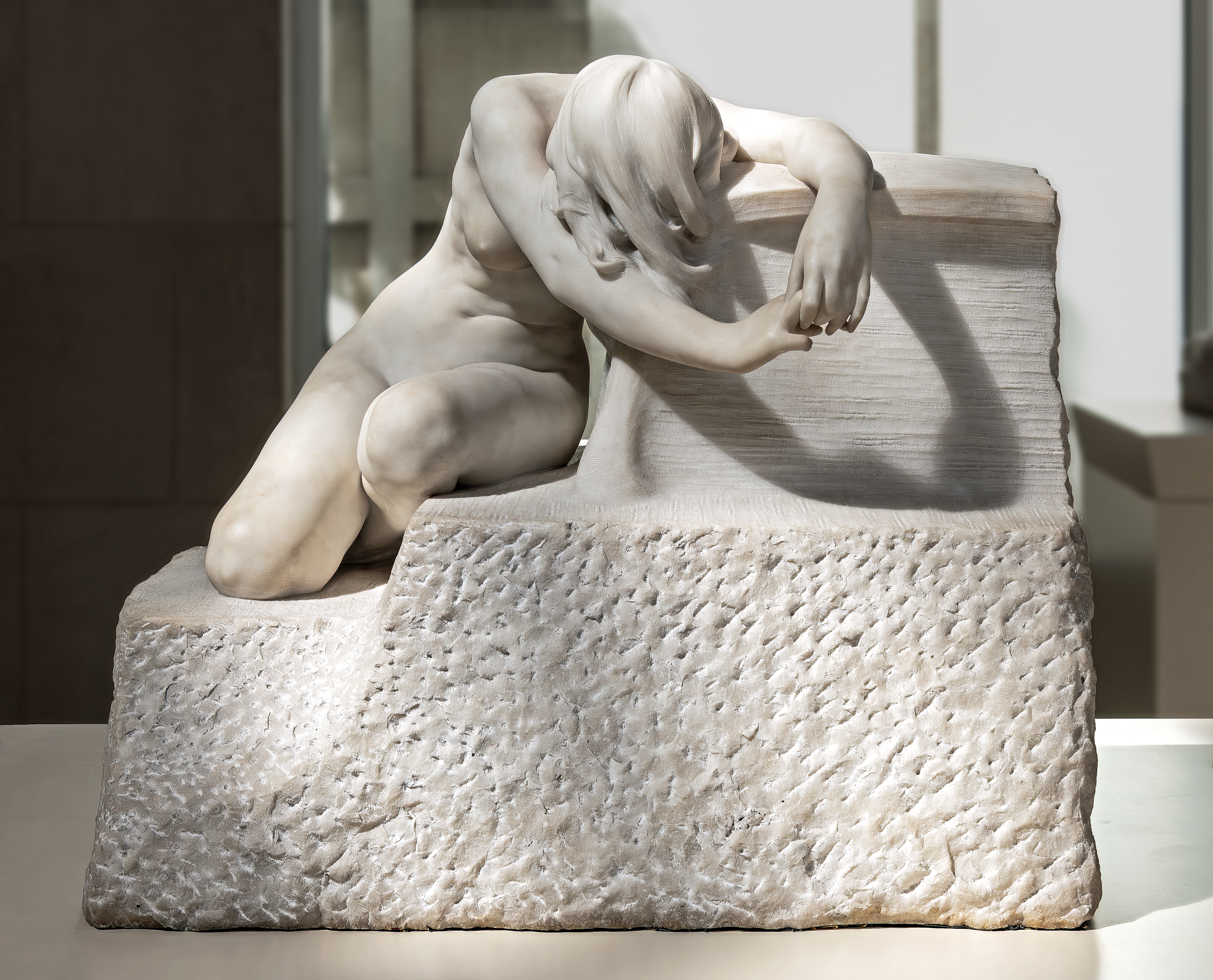
- Artist: Josep Llimona
- Year: 1907
- Type: sculpture
- Dimensions: 66.4 cm × 78.8 cm (26.1 in × 31.0 in)
- Location: Museu Nacional d'Art de Catalunya; Barcelona

Desolation is a sculpture that was crafted by Josep Llimona in 1907, which now resides in the National Art Museum of Catalonia in Barcelona.

== Background ==
Llimona, of the Catalan Modernism school of sculpture, joined the Symbolism movement during the first few years of the 20th century after adopting an idealism deeply rooted in his religious convictions. Llimona contributed to the founding of the Artistic Circle of Sant Lluc, which intended to preserve art from the perceived excesses of contemporary artists. Female nudes were prohibited by the Circle's initial statutes, and Llimona created Desolation after the prohibition was lifted. The work was exhibited for the first time in 1907 and aims to communicate feelings that reflect a deep humanity through a naked female figure.

Desolation, an example of Modernisme sculpture, represents the formal traits of Symbolism as adopted by prominent Catalan sculptors of the day. These traits include undulating lines and softened contours, features that derive from The Danaide by Auguste Rodin. Critics have said that a notable difference exists between the resigned, melancholic and chaste attitude of Desolation and the vitality, strength and sensuality of Rodin's work. With Desolation, Llimona utilised his process of sculptural renewal, while also aiming to exemplify the Symbolist aesthetic of Catalan Modernism.

== Description ==
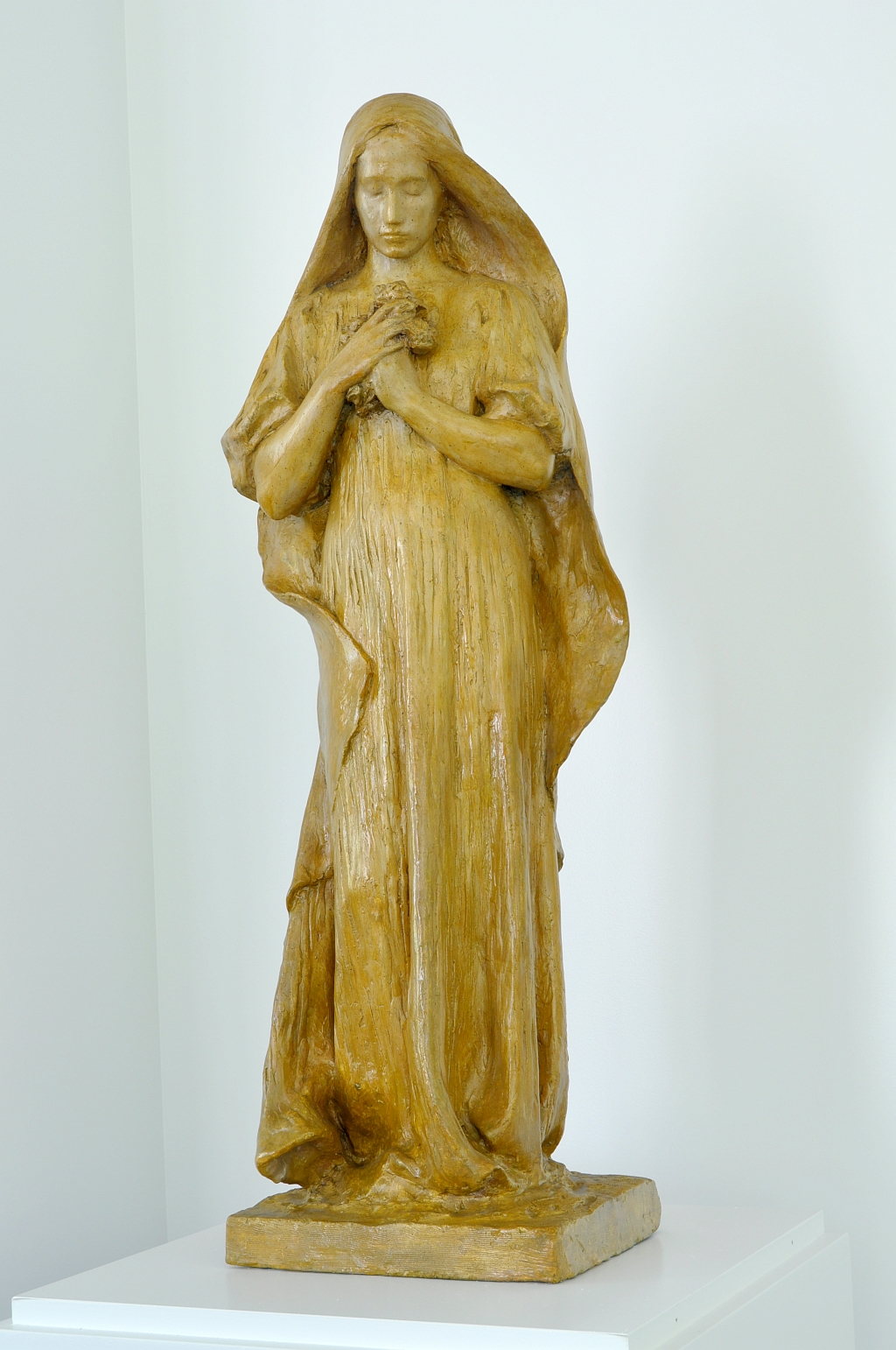
A Virtue by Llimona hold at the Art Museum of Cerdanyola, in Catalonia.

Desolation is a nude version of a figure produced for a burial vault in the Montjuic Cemetery. The sculpture´s measurements are 67 cm x 76 cm x 67 cm (26.4 in x 29.9 in x 31.5 in).

The sculpture belongs to a group of works created specifically for new pantheons built during the early 1900s. Artists created sculptures of angels, or Virtues, that included women overcome by the weight of their grief and allegorical figures reflecting feelings such as despair, grief, or resignation. The artists aimed to capture feeling, rather than beauty. Typical characteristics of these works are languid, bowed female figures with long hair dressed in flowing tunics. Although this style wasn't adopted in all the works, female figures predominate, and their formal characteristics passed into the artistic language used by modernist sculptors in the works they produced for collectors, which discarded the funerary elements of the originals.

The most notable characteristic of Desolation is the ease with which it transmits inner emotions. The hermetic and mysterious nature the sculpture evokes has to do with its posture. The hidden gaze, the closed composition of the body, and its curved contours seem to enclose the figure within its own silence.

== History ==
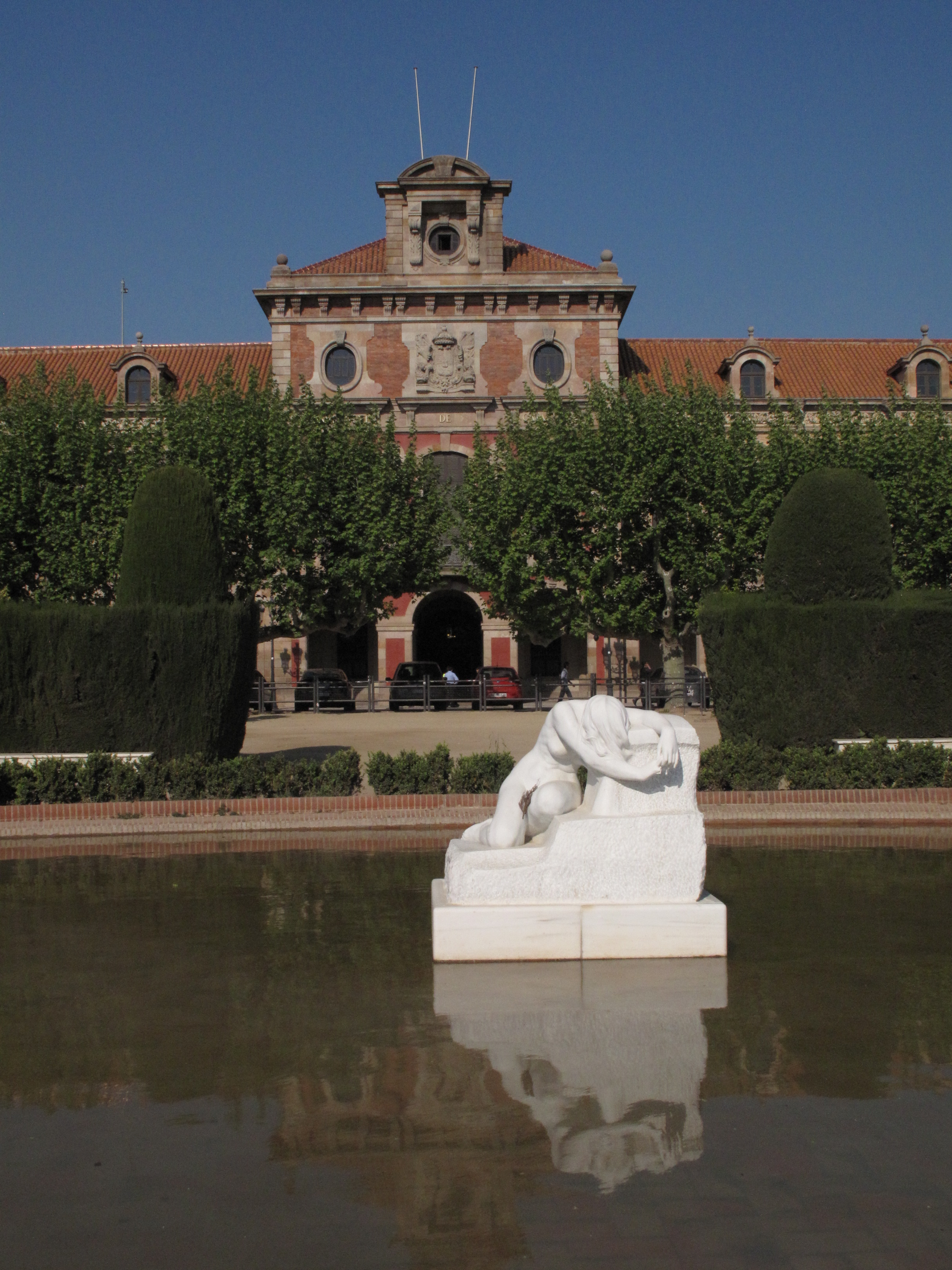
Replica in front of the Parliament of Catalonia (41°23′16″N 2°11′17″E)

The sculpture can be found at The National Art Museum of Catalonia (MNAC). The work earned a gold medal in the V Exposition of Fine Arts of Barcelona in 1907. That same year, a photograph of the work was published in the catalog of the International Exhibit of Art in Barcelona. In 1909, Desolation was purchased by Barcelona's Major Domènec Sanllehy who donated the statue to The Museum of Modern Art of Barcelona. The statue was later moved to the Modern Art gallery of The National Museum of Contemporary Art of Catalonia.

== Replicas ==
In addition to the original, Josep Llimona produced replicas utilizing diverse materials. The bronze replica is somewhat bigger in size than the original. It was presented at an art exhibition that commemorated the work of Josep Llimona at the Parés Salon in 1934. The stone replica is a variation of the original, in which the female figure is clothed. The sculpture is the same size as the original and is part of a funerary monument dedicated to Mercedes Casas de Vilanova. The stone variant of Desolation can be found at the Southeast Cemetery in Barcelona.

In 1917 Josep Llimona produced a second marble replica, much bigger than the original. It measures 78.8 cm x 68.8 cm (31.0 in x 27.1 in.) The sculpture was damaged over time and was replaced by a plaster replica produced in 1984. The sculpture is the centerpiece of a pond situated in front of the Parliament of Catalonia in the Ciutadella park.

A replica is located in the Kelleher Rose Garden in the Back Bay Fens in Boston. It was presented to Boston – one of Barcelona's sister cities – in 1986.

== Analysis ==
Desolation represents a woman hiding her face in an attitude of despair, and is one of the paradigmatic works of the Catalan Modernist movement. One of the principal points of reference for the Catalan modernist artists was the French sculptor Auguste Rodin. The artwork reflects the influence of Rodin's work Danaid but with a more melancholy, chaste approach. The similarities between Llimona's Desconsol and Rodin’s Danaid lie primarily in the modeling technique used by the artist, the composition of the figure, and the thoughtful use of light and shadow. Llimona's masterful work arises from a block of stone, but the softness and roundness of its forms contrasts strongly with the roughness of the material. The female figure evokes contained melancholy that can be perceived subtly; her pose hides much of the inner world of the character. Her face, concealed by a thick veil of hair, is known only to her and Llimona. Only the gesture of the hands, gracing the stone, provide a trace of life to the sculpture.
