= List of disused Barcelona Metro stations =

There are a number of disused stations in the Barcelona Metro network, abandoned for various reasons. This is a comprehensive list:

== Closed down ==
Station	Old line number	Current line	Opened	Closed	Area	District	Notes	Reference
Bordeta	FMT	L1	1926	1983	La Bordeta	Sants-Montjuïc	It was closed as it was deemed unnecessary being too close to Santa Eulàlia.	
Correos	Line I	L4	1934	1972	Via Laietana	Ciutat Vella	The best known among the disused metro stations in the city, it was part of the aforementioned former L4 section.	
Fernando	GMB	L3	1946	1968	La Rambla	Ciutat Vella	Belongs to a section of the line which was closed when L3 expanded into the area and L4 started growing in another direction. It was replaced by Drassanes.	

== Never opened ==
Station	Old line number	Current line	Built	Area	District	Notes	References
Banc	Line I	L4	1911	Via Laietana	Ciutat Vella	It was built in the area known nowadays as Plaça d'Antonio Maura, the seat of the headquarters of a few banks, but was never opened to public use. In 1925 it became the line's depot, and it may have also been used by the banking institutions.	
Gaudí	Line II	L5	1968	Sagrada Família	Eixample	The station was next to Sagrada Família and was an early project for what would eventually become the current Sagrada Família metro station. It can be seen at times from the carriage at the station, when there's enough lighting, as it's 11.65m. under the surface.	
Travessera	Line I	L3	Never built	Gran de Gràcia	Gràcia	Located between Diagonal and Fontana, around Travessera de Gràcia, it was envisioned as a midpoint between these two stations, which were deemed to be too far from each other, but it was never built.	

== Moved to nearby locations ==
All these are still in use, but have been moved somewhere around their original location.

- Santa Eulàlia - L1
- Espanya - L1
- Universitat - L1

== See also ==
- Transport in Barcelona
- List of Barcelona Metro stations
