= Laietani =

The Iberian Peninsula in the 3rd century BC

The Laietani or Laeetani were an ancient Iberian (Pre-Roman) people of the Iberian Peninsula (the Roman Hispania). They inhabited the area occupied by the city of Barcelona. One of the main thoroughfares of the city, Via Laietana, is named after the Laietani. They are believed to have spoken an Iberian language.

== Name ==
Iberian coins, with the inscription laieśken in northeastern Iberian script, dating from the 2nd and 1st centuries BCE, are interpreted as minted by the Laietani, and bearing an endonym of that people in the Iberian language: from the Laietani or from those of Laie. A minority view takes the ś to be part of the name. Conventionally, seven other types of coins have been catalogued as Laietanian, but without a firm connection, as their places of minting are usually unknown. In addition, the name is attested in a few inscriptions. Ancient geographers and writers that have written about the area used a greater variety of names, including Laletani/Laletanum, Lasetani and Lacetani (or at least their manuscript traditions do). Modern editors tend to emend those writings based on the epigraphic evidence, while Lacetani is connected with the other Iberian people of Iacetani.

== Gallery ==
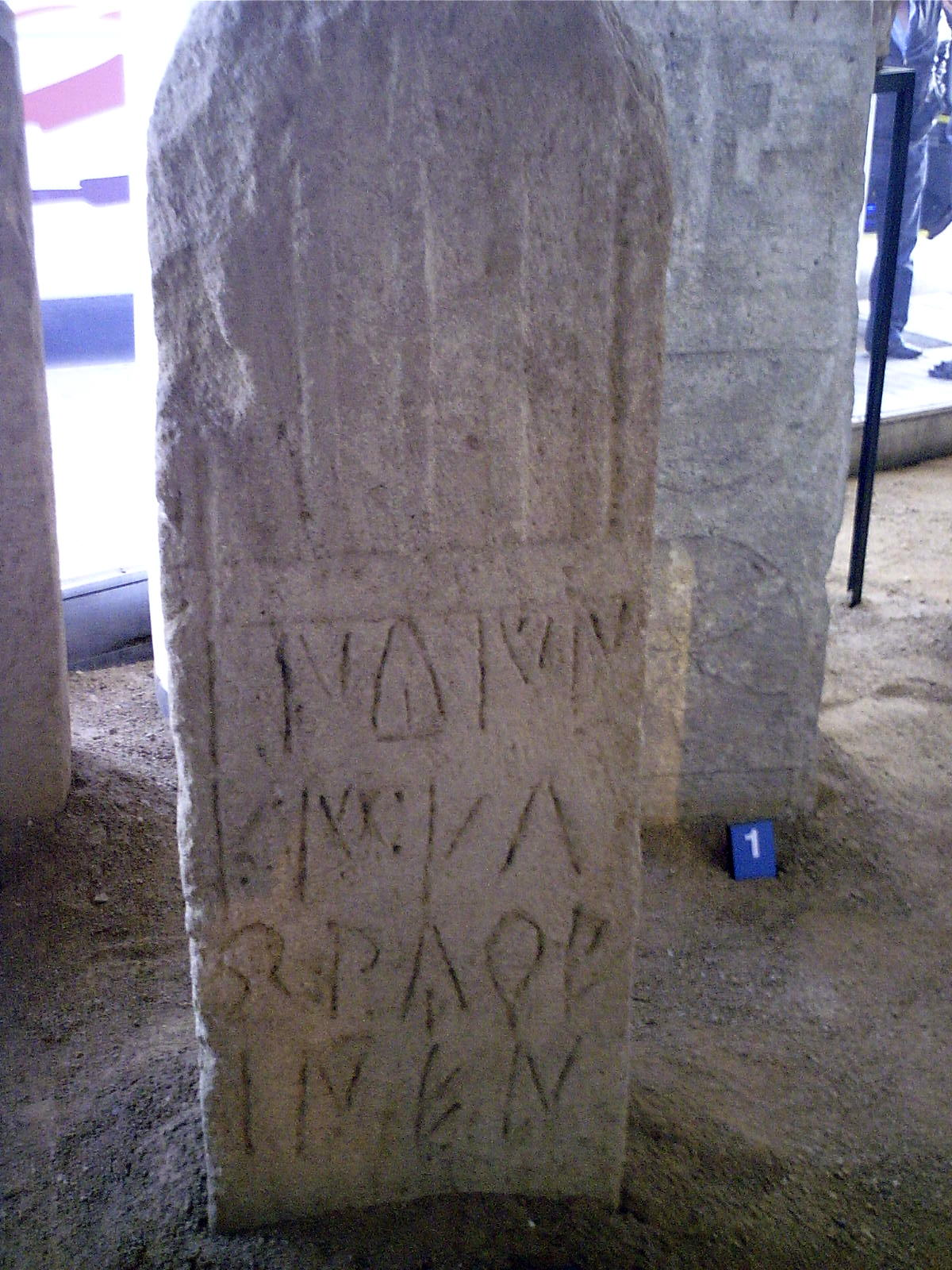
Funerary stele from Badalona

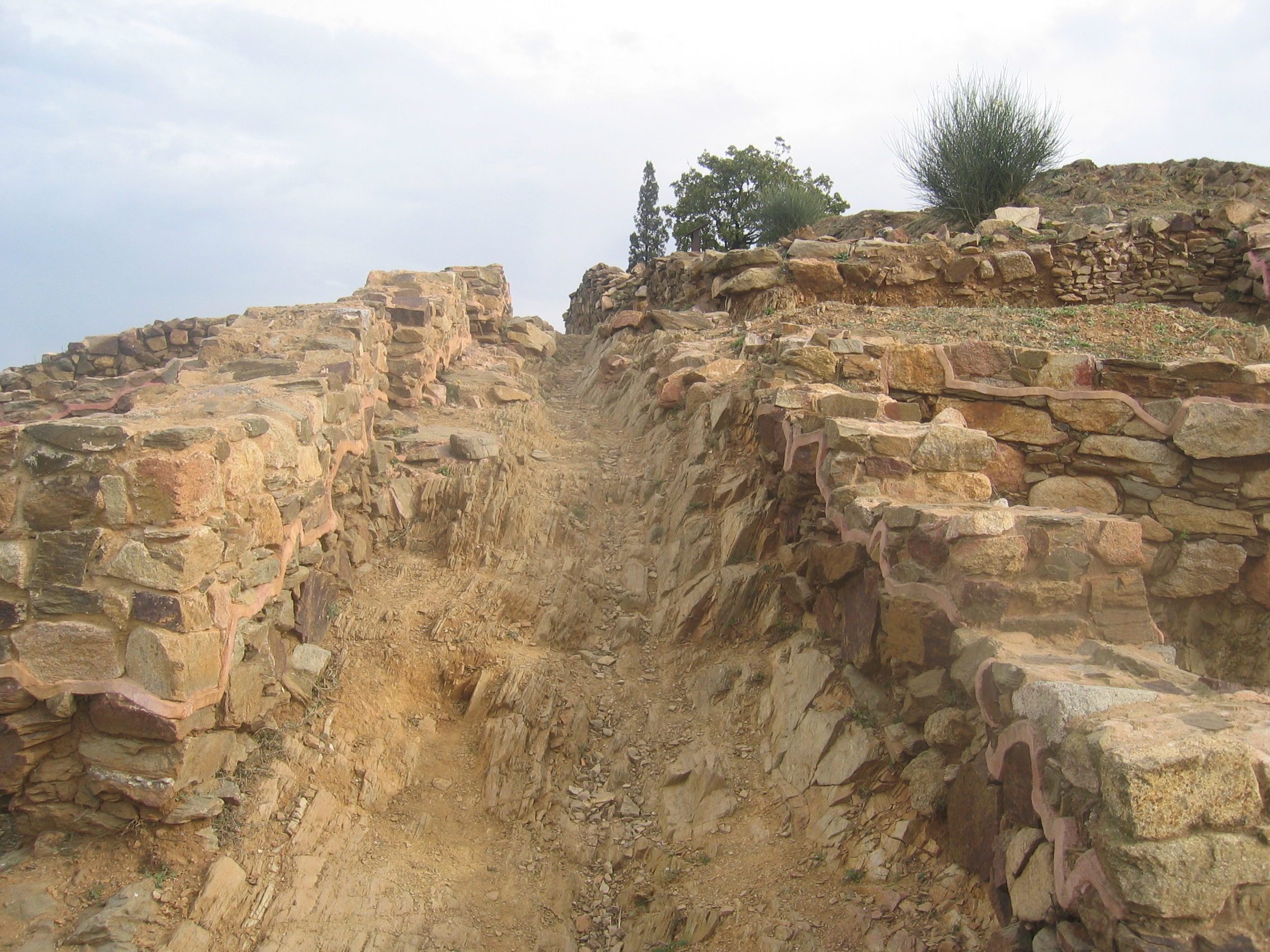
Ruins of the Puig Castellar Iberian village, Santa Coloma de Gramenet

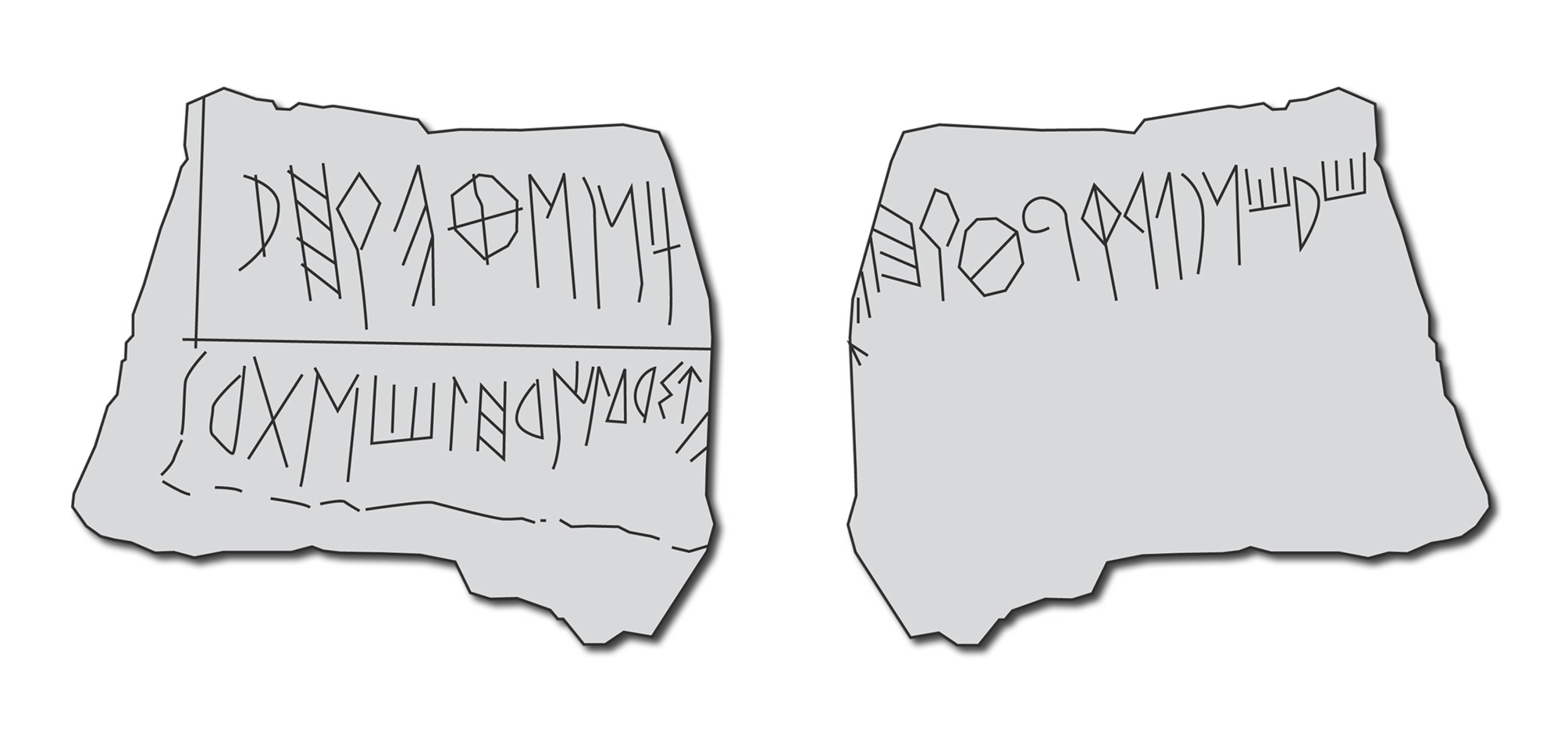
Inscribed lead plates from the Iberian archaeological site Penya del Moro, Sant Just Desvern

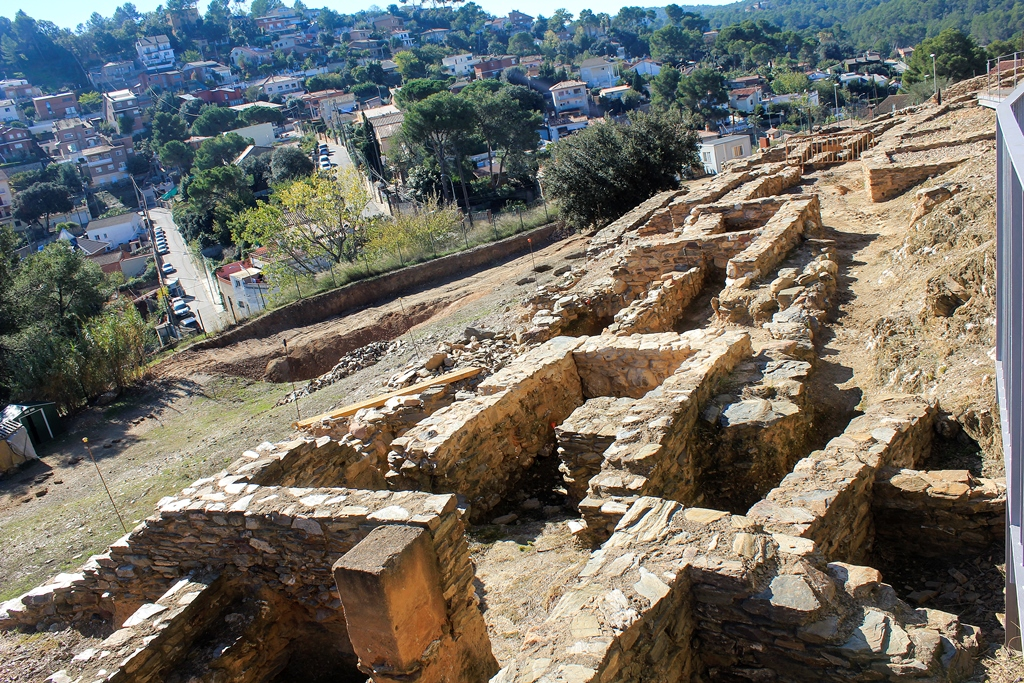
Vestiges of iberian archaeological site Ca n'Oliver Iberian Settlement and Museum, Cerdanyola del Vallès

== See also ==
- Lacetani
- Iberians
- Pre-Roman peoples of the Iberian Peninsula
