= Feliu Elias =

Spanish painter, art historian and historian (1878–1948)

Feliu Elias i Bracons (October 7, 1878 – August 1948) was a Catalan caricaturist, painter and critic.

== Biography ==
He was born in Barcelona. He studied art at the Hoyos Painting Academy and the Cercle Artístic de Sant Lluc in Barcelona. During the first third of the twentieth century he achieved popularity as a cartoonist for various magazines, using the pseudonym Apa. Beginning in 1902, he contributed drawings to the magazine Cu-Cut!. In 1908, he founded the satirical magazine Papitu. He also published comics and cartoons in L'Esquella de la Torratxa, El Senyor Canons, Mirador, and many other magazines. In 1911, he fled to Paris to avoid arrest after a series of drawings he published in Papitu offended the government.

His cartoons in favor of the allied cause in World War I were collected in the book Kameraden, and earned him the Cross of the Legion of Honor. He made the daily vignette of the main Catalan newspaper of the twenties and thirties, La Publicitat, and wrote a treatise entitled L'Art de la caricatura (The Art of Caricature).

He developed an important work as an artistic critic, under the pseudonym "Joan Sacs", writing articles in the Catalan press and several books.

He also devoted himself to painting in a Magic Realist style, in which the still lifes, portraits and landscapes stand out. The Spanish critic Juan Manuel Bonet has compared Eliu's work to that of the German New Objectivity movement, and termed him "in a way, our Félix Vallotton".

Josep Pla dedicated one of his portraits in Homenots to Eliu.

Fayans Català (ca. 1904)

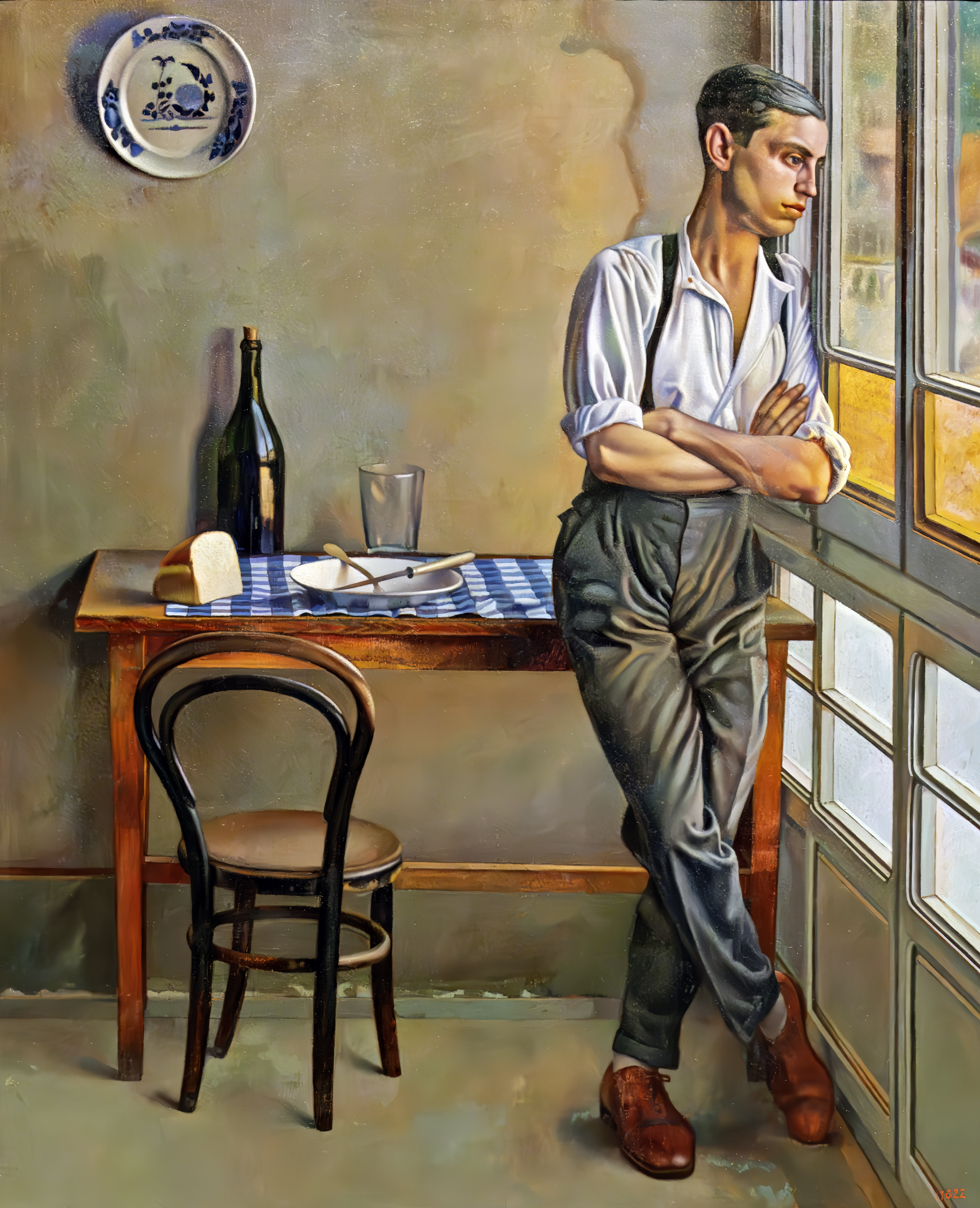
The Galery 1928 - in Museu Nacional d'Art de Catalunya
