= Cerdanyola Museum =

Museum in Cerdanyola del Vallès, Spain

Coordinates: 41°29′19.61″N 2°8′9.11″E

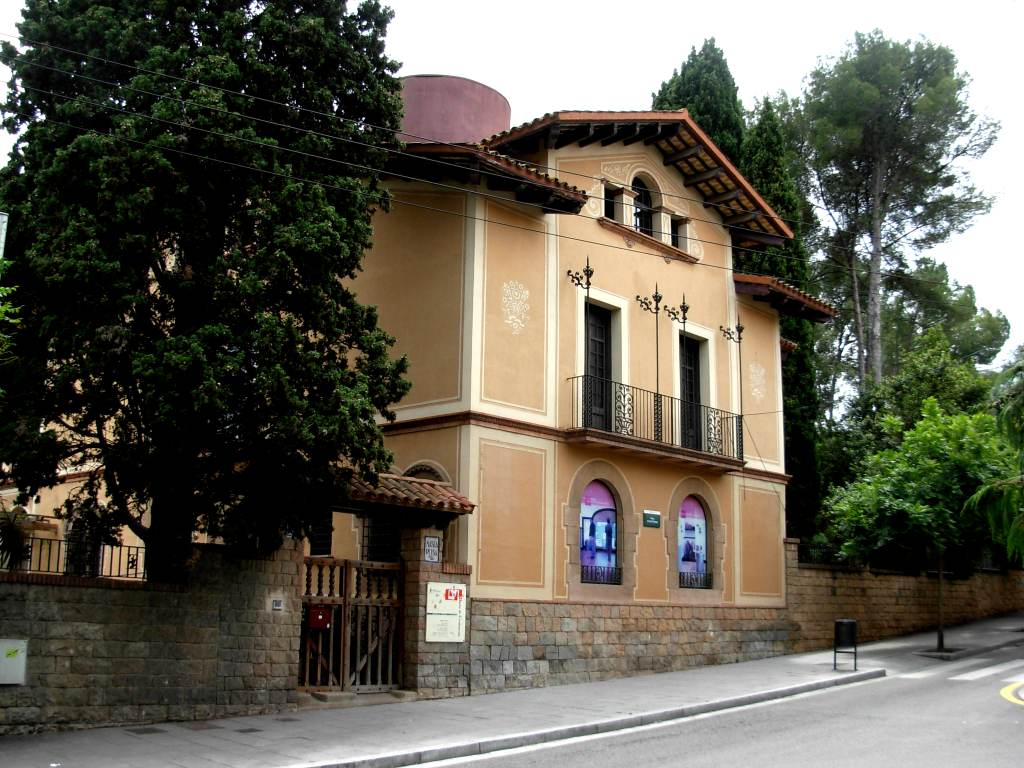
Front of Ca n'Ortadó, central building of the Museum.

The Cerdanyola Museum (Catalan: Museu de Cerdanyola) is a museum in Cerdanyola del Vallès, Vallès Occidental, Catalonia, Spain. It is guided by the belief that the museum is the territory itself and comprises a group of spaces spread throughout the area. The museum’s objective is to offer a didactic approach to the evolution of the population of this area of El Vallès, following the thread of its history from prehistory to the present day. The Museum is part of the Barcelona Provincial Council Local Museum Network.

Currently, the Ca n’Ortadó central building is closed to the public, immersed in an intense remodelling process in relation to the 2009 opening of the Cerdanyola Art Museum and that of the Ca n'Oliver Iberian Settlement and Museum, in 2010.

== See also ==
- Cerdanyola Art Museum. Can Domènech
- Ca n'Oliver Iberian Settlement and Museum
