= Correos station =

Former metro station in Barcelona, Spain

Correos
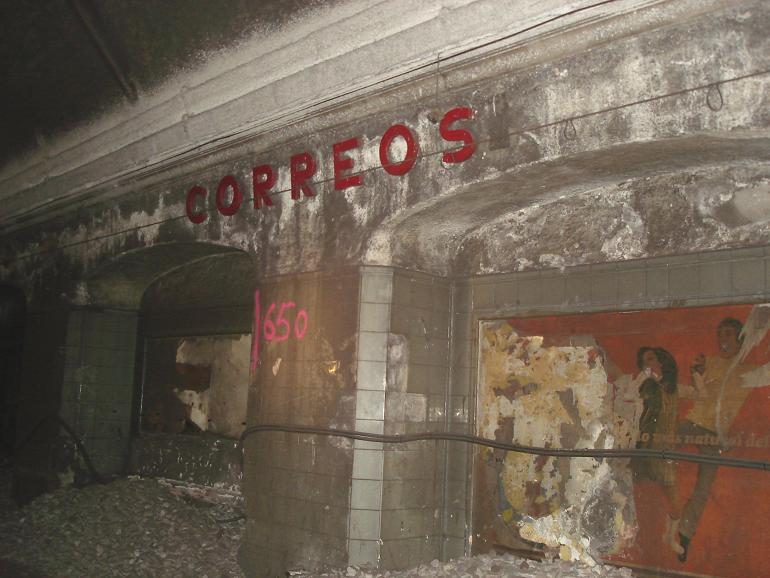

General information
- Location: Via Laietana, Ciutat Vella, Barcelona
- Coordinates: 41°22′55″N 2°10′53″E
- System: Barcelona Metro rapid transit station
- Owner: Transports Metropolitans de Barcelona
- Platforms: 2 side platforms
- Tracks: 1

Construction
- Structure type: Underground

History
- Opened: 1934
- Closed: 1972

Services
None (abandoned)
Location
- Location within Barcelona Location within Spain

Correos (Spanish) or Correus (Catalan) was a Barcelona metro station. The station site is located on what is now line L4 between the existing stations of Jaume I and Barceloneta, and under the street of Via Laietana.

The station opened in 1934 as a terminus of a branch of the Gran Metro de Barcelona, Barcelona's first metro line. The Gran Metro de Barcelona came to be known as line L3 but Correos remained the terminus of a branch. The station was dismantled in 1972 to permit the extension of the line into La Barceloneta, as part of the integration of the branch into line L4.

Along with Banco, it is one of the two metro stations on Via Laietana that have disappeared.

== See also ==
- Disused Barcelona Metro stations
- Gaudí (Barcelona Metro)
- Banc (Barcelona Metro)
