= Cerdanyola Art Museum =

Art museum in Cerdanyola del Vallès, Spain

Coordinates: 41°29′26.94″N 2°08′13.52″E

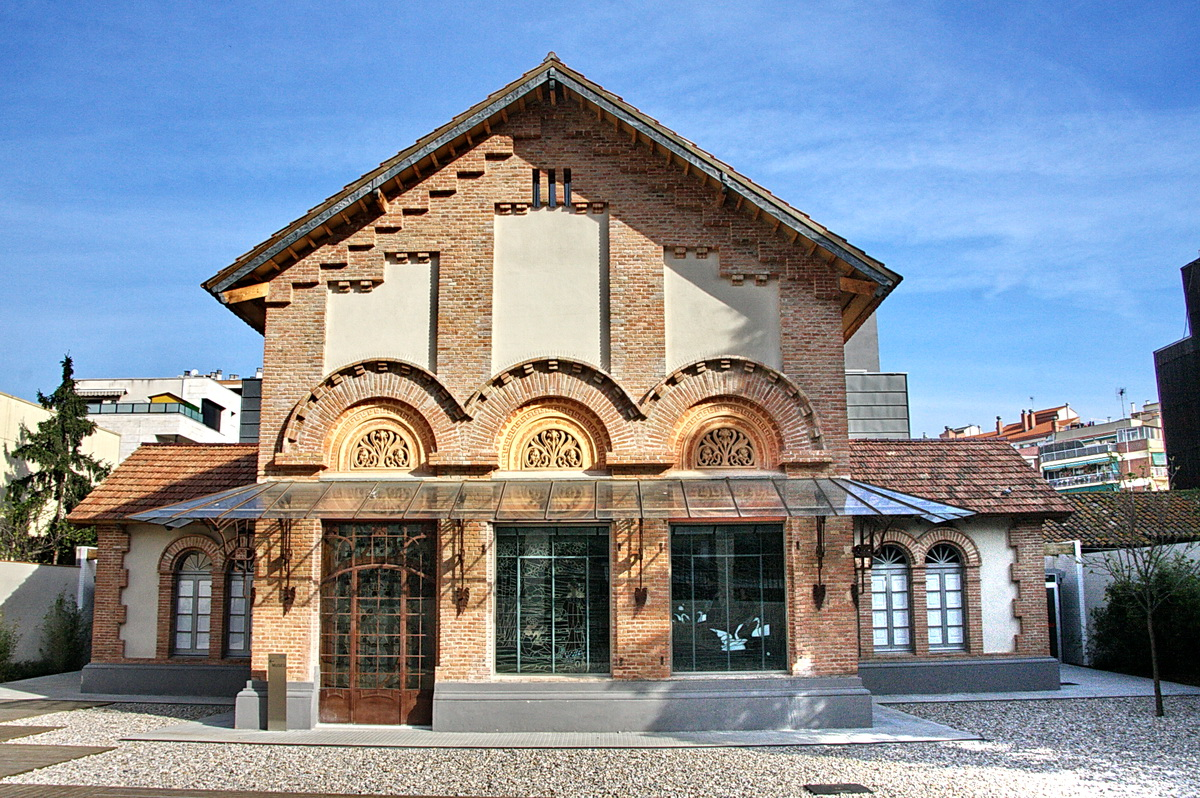
Front of Can Domènech

The Cerdanyola Art Museum, also known as Can Domènech, is an art museum located in the old quarter of the city of Cerdanyola del Vallès. It was opened on 10 September 2009 and is part of the Barcelona Provincial Council Local Museum Network and of the Art Nouveau European Route.

== The building ==
The building, work of architect Gaietà Buïgas and Eduard Maria Balcells, dates back to 1894. It is one of the most noteworthy constructions of local Art Nouveau. In 2003, the building was approved for remodelling with the help of sponsorship from individuals and entities such as the Government of Catalonia, Barcelona Provincial Council, the Barcelona Metropolitan Area Municipal Association, the Banc de Sabadell Foundation, Obra Social Caixa Sabadell and Obra Social Caixa Catalunya. The restoration works were carried out from 2006 to July 2009 under the direction of architect Víctor Argentí.

== Permanent collection ==
The backbone of the permanent exhibition is Art Nouveau and the Cerdanyola artists’ community. It comprises the period between 1880 and 1930, a time in which the town was a spot where the Catalan and, in particular, Barcelona, bourgeoisie spent the summer. The museum collection is made up of material owned by Cerdanyola Town Council and donations from entities and individuals, and includes works by artists such as Ismael Smith, Josep Togores, Josep Llimona and Manolo Hugué. Of particular note are the large Art Nouveau windows known as the Tríptic de les dames de Cerdanyola (triptych of the ladies of Cerdanyola).

== See also ==
- Cerdanyola Museum
- Ca n'Oliver Iberian Settlement and Museum
