= Via Laietana =

Thoroughfare in Barcelona, Spain

Coordinates: 41°23′07″N 2°10′37″E

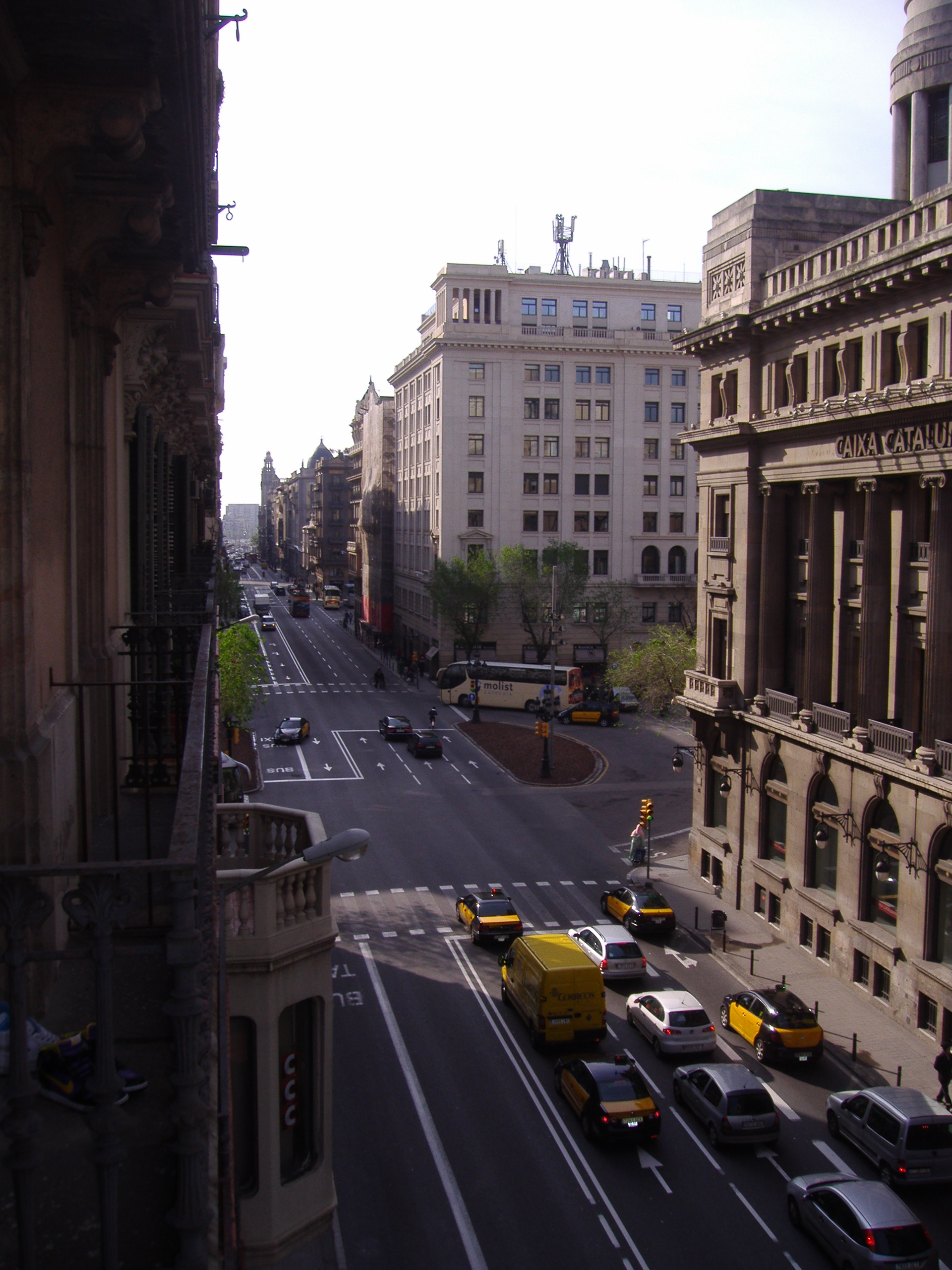
- Looking South towards the Port

- Via Laietana within the district of Ciutat Vella
- Length: 1.1054 km (0.6869 mi)
- Location: Ciutat Vella, Barcelona, Catalonia, Spain
- From: Plaça d'Urquinaona
- To: Plaça d’Idrissa Diallo and Plaça de Correus

Construction
- Inauguration: 1907

Via Laietana (Catalan pronunciation: [ˈbi.ə ləjəˈtanə]) is a major street in Barcelona, Catalonia, Spain, in the Ciutat Vella district. The avenue runs from Plaça d'Urquinaona, at the city center, to Plaça d'Idrissa Diallo and Plaça de Correus (formerly Plaça d'Antonio López), by the seafront, and separates the neighbourhoods of the old city it has on either side: La Ribera/El Born and Sant Pere on one and Barri Gòtic on the other. It can be seen as an extension of Carrer de Pau Claris in the Eixample.

It is lined with numerous examples of Modernista, Art Deco, and Noucentista neo-classical architecture, and historically hosted the headquarters of a number of banks (notably the former buildings of la Caixa and Caixa Catalunya), as well as other institutions.

Via Laietana was named after the Laietani, an Iberian people who inhabited the region around Barcelona, Maresme, Vallès, and Baix Llobregat.

== History ==
The construction of Via Laietana was first projected in 1879 and started in 1907, with the aim of communicating Eixample with the waterfront, amid much controversy due to the required demolition of a large number of houses and the removal of the streets in the area. As some of the traditional guilds of the city, some dating back to the Middle Ages, were located there, they had to be relocated in different parts of Barri Gòtic, notably Plaça de Sant Felip Neri. The first section to be built was named Carrer de Bilbao, which nowadays is a separate, shorter street that stems from the larger Via Laietana. The avenue was finished in 1926. Francesc Cambó, a prominent politician of the time, built his personal residence in the avenue.

During the years of the Spanish Civil War (1936-1939), the road was renamed Via Durruti, in honour of the anarchist militia leader Buenaventura Durruti. It hosted the headquarters of the CNT-FAI and the General Commissariat of Public Order, in close proximity to each other.

== Architecture ==
As an avenue built in the early 20th century, its buildings reflect the aesthetic ideals of the period, and of the different political regimes. The style of some of its buildings has no other referent in Barcelona and has much more in common with the architecture that can be seen in Madrid. A number of these buildings are being converted into hotels.

=== Buildings of interest ===
- Conservatori Superior de Música del Liceu
- Caixa de Pensions Building (1917), by Enric Sagnier - Unusual office building built in a trend of the Neo-Gothic style inspired by central European churches with a white façade.
- Casa Bulbena-Salas (1924-1926) by Joan A. Roig.
- Edifici del Col·legi d'Enginyers Industrials (1922) by Antoni Ferrater.
- Casa Artur Suqué (1927) by Adolf Florensa.
- Caixa Catalunya building (1931) by José Yárnoz Larrosa and Luis Menéndez Pidal Álvarez - It's been the Caixa Catalunya headquarters since 1955, but originally hosted Banco de España.
- Casa dels Velers (1758-1763) by Juan Garrido i Bertrán
- Foment del Treball building (1934-1936) by Adolf Florensa - rationalist building, influenced by the Chicago School.
- Edifici de Tabacs (1923) by Francesc Guàrdia Vidal.
- Edifici de Correus (1926-1927 by Josep Goday Casals and Jaume Torres Grau.

=== Places of interest in the vicinity ===
- Palau de la Música Catalana
- Santa Caterina market
- Cathedral of Santa Eulàlia

== Two closed metro stations ==
Via Laietana hosted two metro stations that were finally dismantled and abandoned because of different reasons. Correus was closed because of major changes in the metro line that crossed the area, and Banc was never opened.

== Transport ==
=== Bus ===
- Line 17
- Line 19
- Line 40
- Line 45

=== Metro ===
- Jaume I (L4)
- Urquinaona (L1, L4)

== Gallery ==
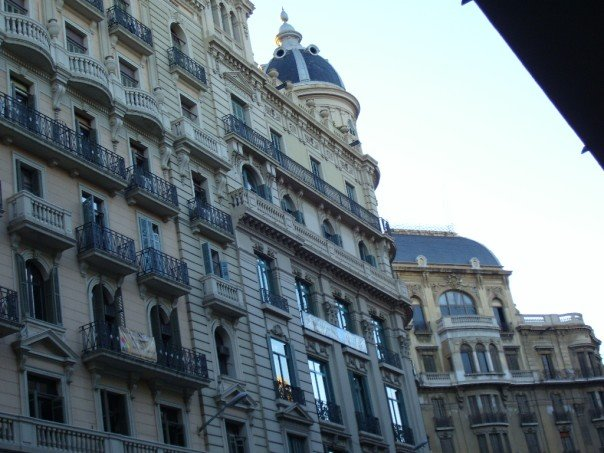
Casa Heribert Sales, with Casa Bulbena-Salas in the background.

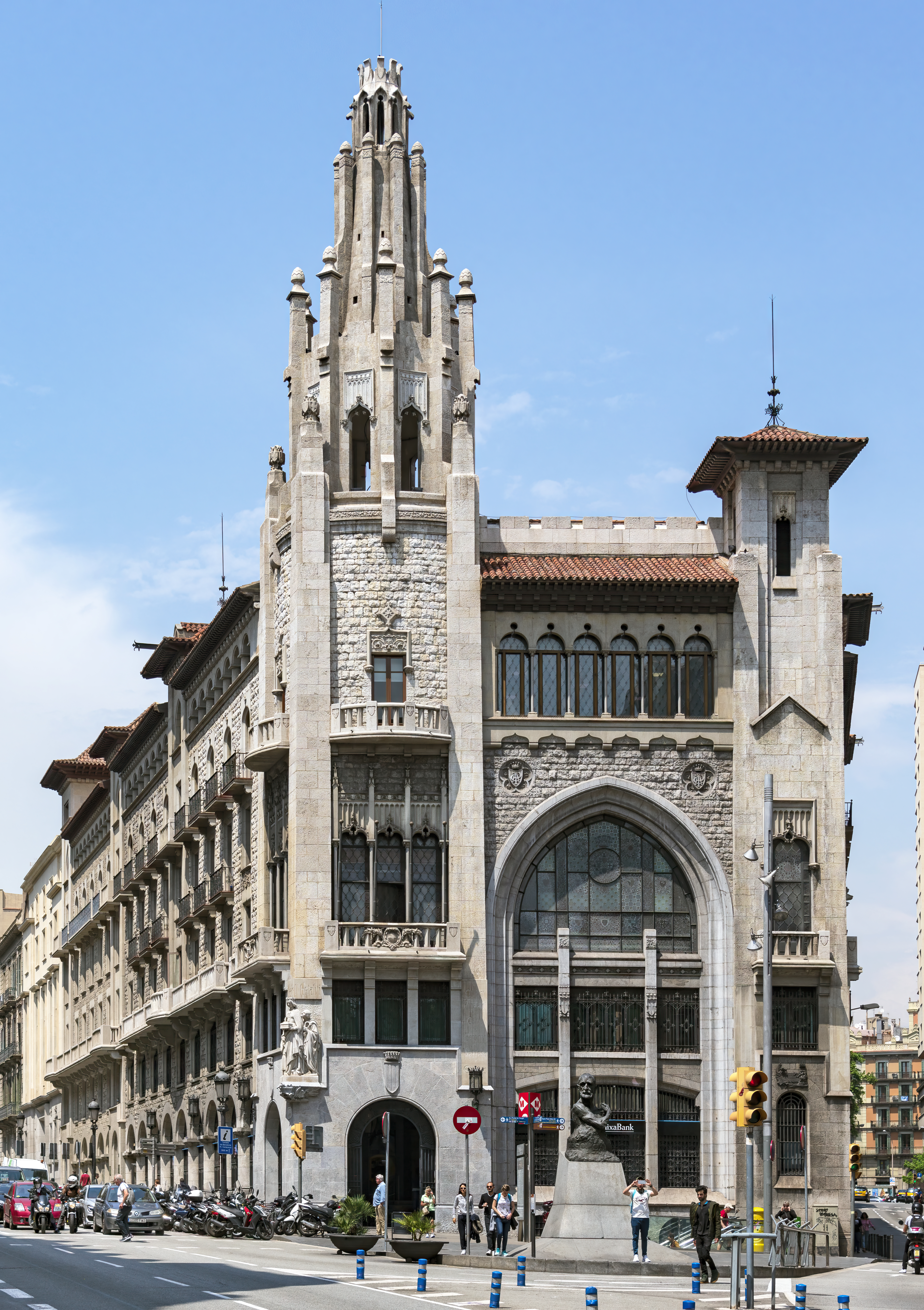
Caixa de Pensions building.

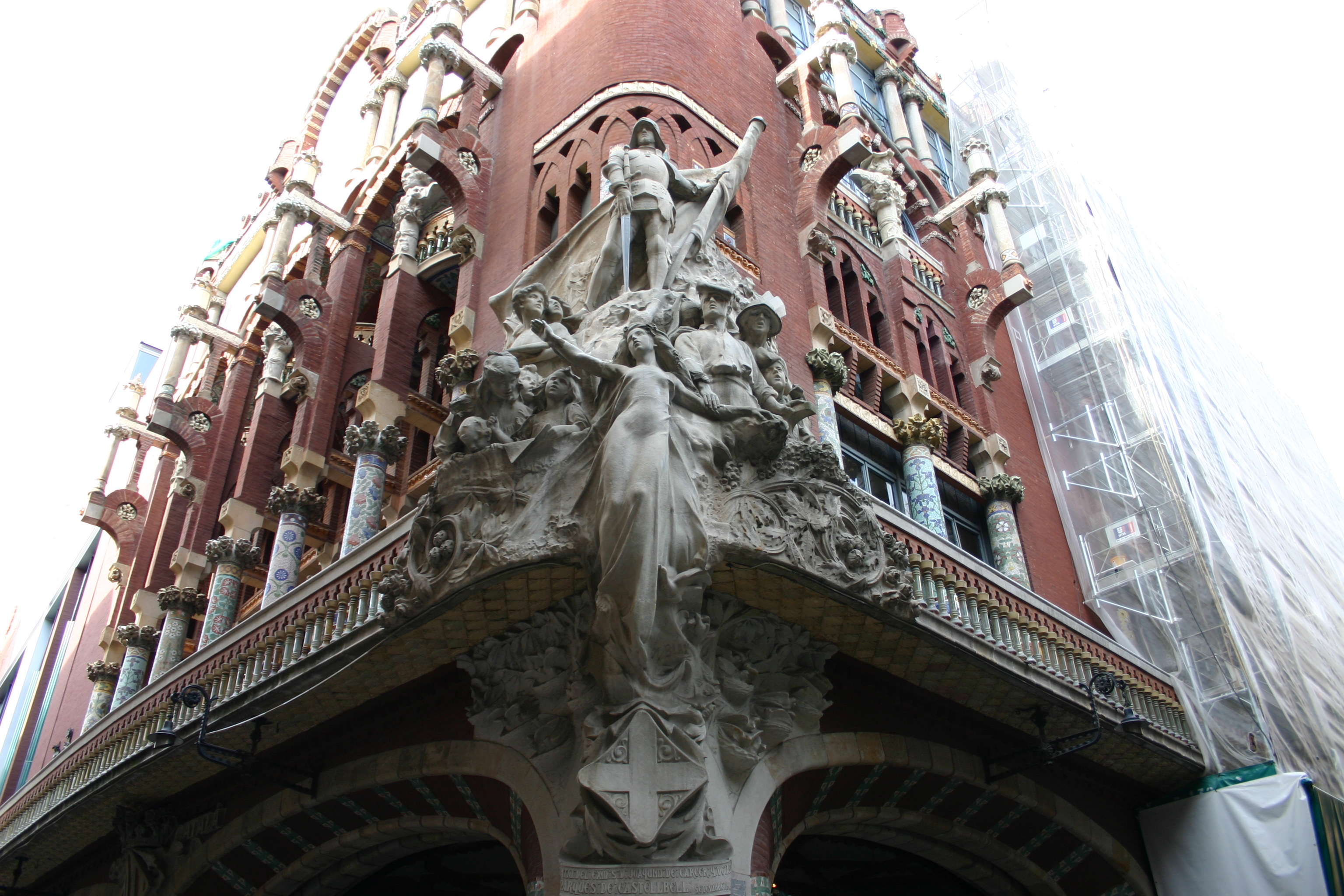
The prestigious Palau de la Música Catalana is located next to Via Laietana

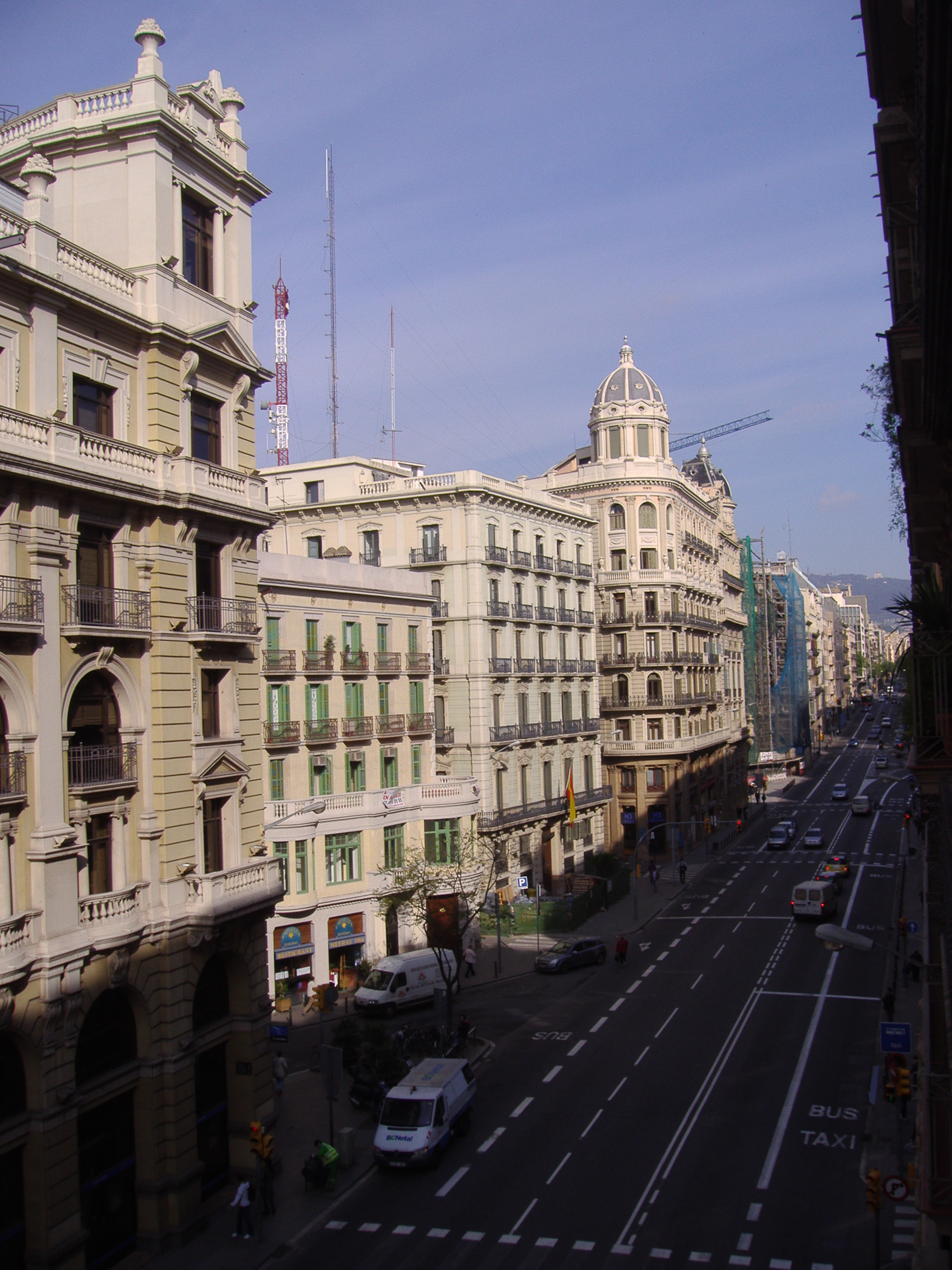
View North along the Via Laietana.

== See also ==
- History of Barcelona
- Francesc Cambó
- List of streets and squares in Eixample
- Street names in Barcelona
- Urban planning of Barcelona
