= Gaudí station =

Railway station in Barcelona, Spain

Gaudí
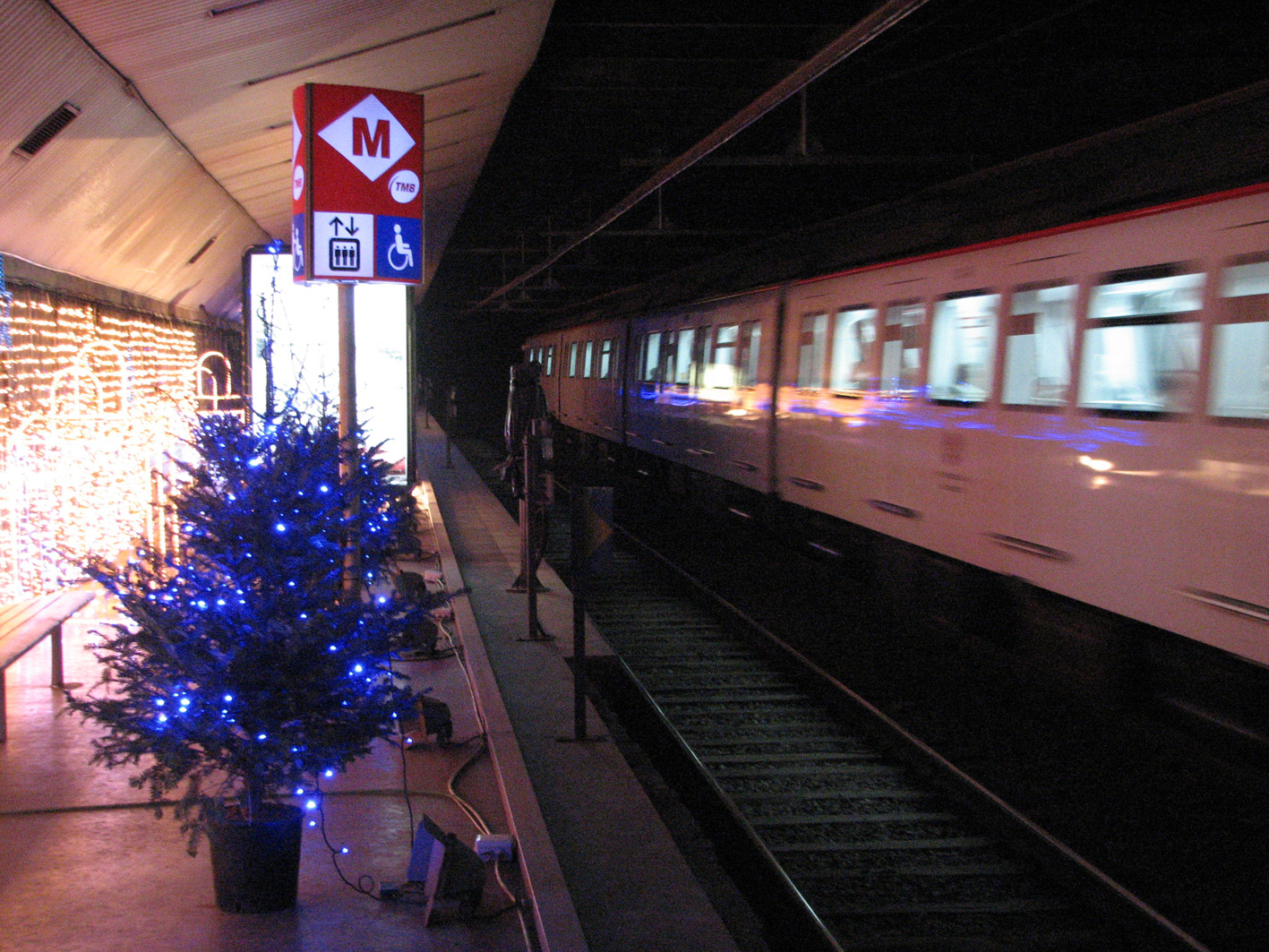
- Gaudí station with Christmas decorations in 2008

General information
- Location: Barcelona
- System: Barcelona Metro rapid transit station
- Owner: Transports Metropolitans de Barcelona

Construction
- Structure type: Underground
Location

Gaudí is a defunct metro station of the Barcelona Metro. The Line 5 trains continue to pass through the station. The upper lobby has been converted into an office for retired TMB workers.

== History ==
Built in the 1960s, the station was originally to be part of the old Line II of the Barcelona Metro. However plans changed and the station was rerouted to part of the Line 5. Because of its close proximity to the station Sagrada Familia, it was ultimately decided not to open the station. As a result, the Gaudí station was fully constructed but has never been opened to the public. Its main lobby currently serves as a retirement office for Barcelona Metro employees.

== See also ==
- List of disused Barcelona Metro stations
- Correos (Barcelona Metro)
- Banc (Barcelona Metro)
