= Ca n'Oliver Iberian Settlement and Museum =

- Poblat ibèric de Ca n'Oliver (Catalan)
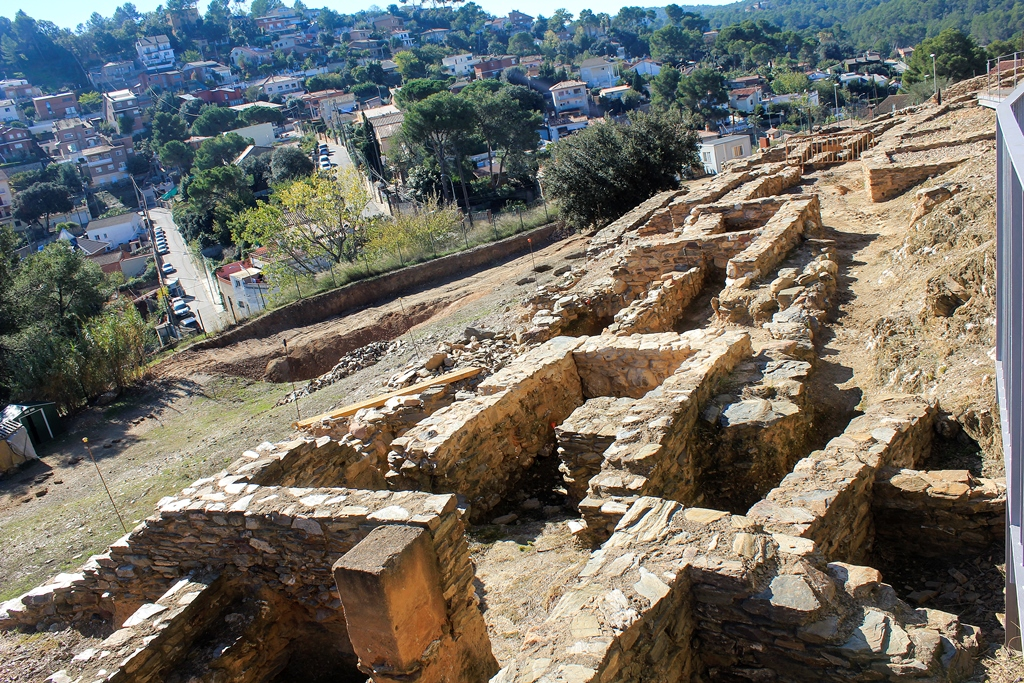
- Ca n'Oliver Iberian Settlement
- Interactive map of Ca n'Oliver Iberian Settlement and Museum
- 41°28′51.3″N 2°08′05.6″E
- Type: Settlement
- Location: Cerdanyola del Vallès, Catalonia, Spain

History
- Built: 7th century BC
- Built by: Iberians
- Abandoned: 1st century BC

The Ca n'Oliver Iberian settlement is a very large Iberian settlement found in the Collserola mountain range, in the territory formerly known as Laietania, in present-day Cerdanyola del Vallès. It is an archaeological site that was inhabited between the 6th century and 50 BC and, later on, in the Middle Ages.

== History ==
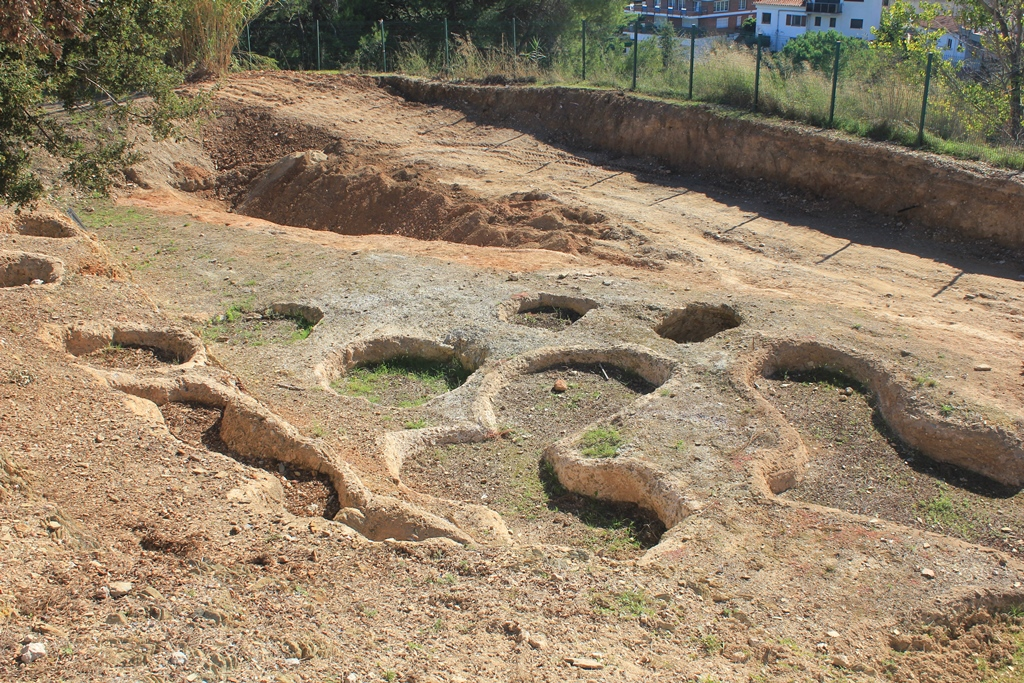
Field of silos

The settlement was inhabited during the time of the Iberians. Initially it was just rows of simple houses grouped together and built within a large plot of land. During the full Iberian period, the houses grew larger and diversified, and the settlement was at its most prosperous with the construction of an access road, moat, and a field of silos for storing leftover farm products, which were later sold to other Mediterranean towns.

The settlement was destroyed at the end of the 3rd or the beginning of the 2nd century BC, a result of the Punic Wars (218-206 BC), but it was rebuilt during the end of the Iberian period. Years later, with the arrival of the new territorial organisation imposed by the Romans, the Iberians abandoned the settlement for good.

During the 9th and 10th centuries, in the high Middle Ages, the settlement was once again inhabited, taking advantage of some of the Iberian buildings and silos.

== Museumization ==
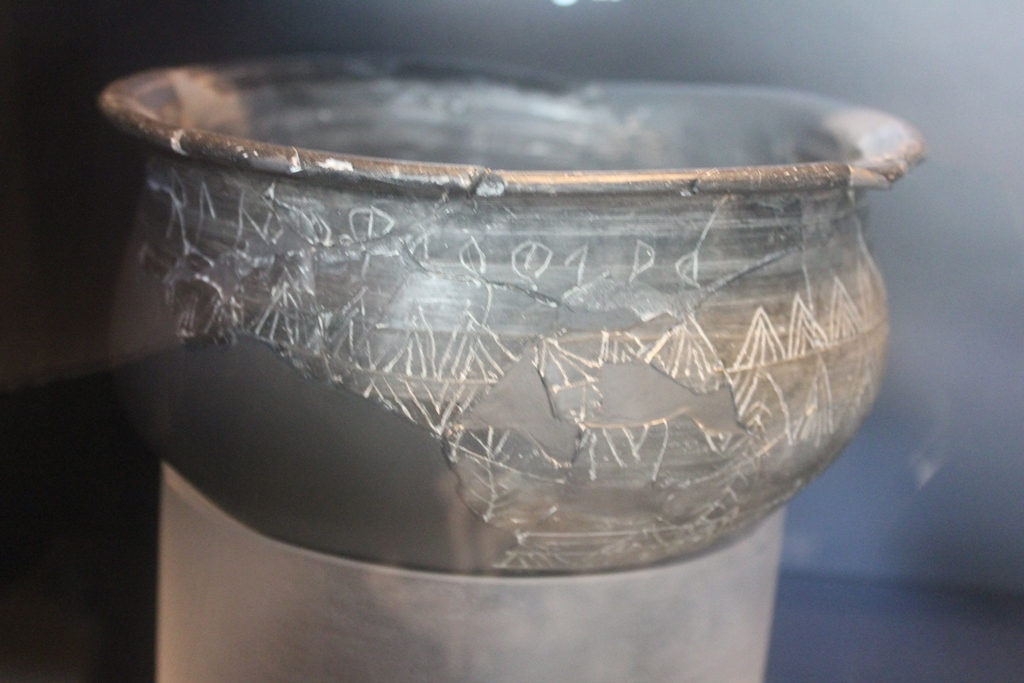
Vessel with Iberian script

On 1 October 2010, the Ca n'Oliver Iberian Settlement and Museum was opened, located in the settlement's old quarry, which puts on display a wider selection of the large volume objects recovered during excavations and places the settlement on 'The Route of the Iberians', a cultural tourism project of the Archaeology Museum of Catalonia.

The museum is provided with a modern Interpretation Center intended to disseminate Iberian culture in Catalonia.

== See also ==
- Cerdanyola Art Museum. Can Domènech
- Cerdanyola Museum
