= Joan Llimona =

Spanish artist

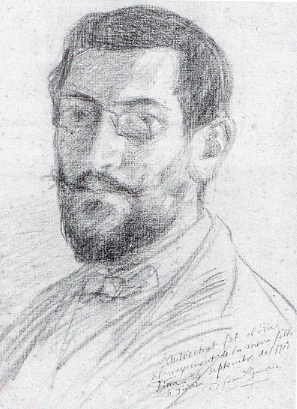
- Self Portrait by Joan Llimona, 1903
- Born: Joan Llimona i Bruguera; 23 June 1860; Barcelona, Catalunya, Spain
- Died: 23 February 1926 (aged 65); Barcelona, Catalunya, Spain
- Education: School of Llotja, Barcelona
- Known for: Painter
- Movement: Orientalist; Cercle Artístic de Sant Lluc; Modernist

Joan Llimona i Bruguera (1860–1926) was a Spanish artist who rose to popularity at end of the Romantic movement in Europe, Llimona was a key contributor to the modernist movement Llimona was born in Barcelona in 1860 and died in 1926 in his hometown of Barcelona. Despite his brief life, Llimona made a lasting impact on the modernist movement in European art during the early 20th century. Deeply influenced by religion, many of Llimona's works deal with religious scenes and beliefs and subsequently communicate often controversial religious messages.

== Early life ==
Llimona was born in Barcelona, Spain on June 23, 1860. He was born into an extremely religious and artistic family. Llimona was particularly close to his brother, Josep Llimona, who was an accomplished modernist sculptor.

Llimona had two children who were also large forces in the European art community: Nuria Llimona Raymer, a painter, and Mercedes Llimona Raymer, an illustrator. Joan Llimona died in 1926 in Barcelona.

== Education ==
Before Llimona became an accomplished and controversial artist, he studied architecture and engineering. Shortly after discovering his aptitude for painting, Llimona abandoned his architecture studies in favor of studying painting at the School of Llotja in Barcelona.

Llimona also spent large amounts of time studying painting in different cities throughout Europe. His time was concentrated studying painting in Madrid and Venice. During his frequent trips to Madrid, Llimona concentrated his time studying the paintings at the Prado.

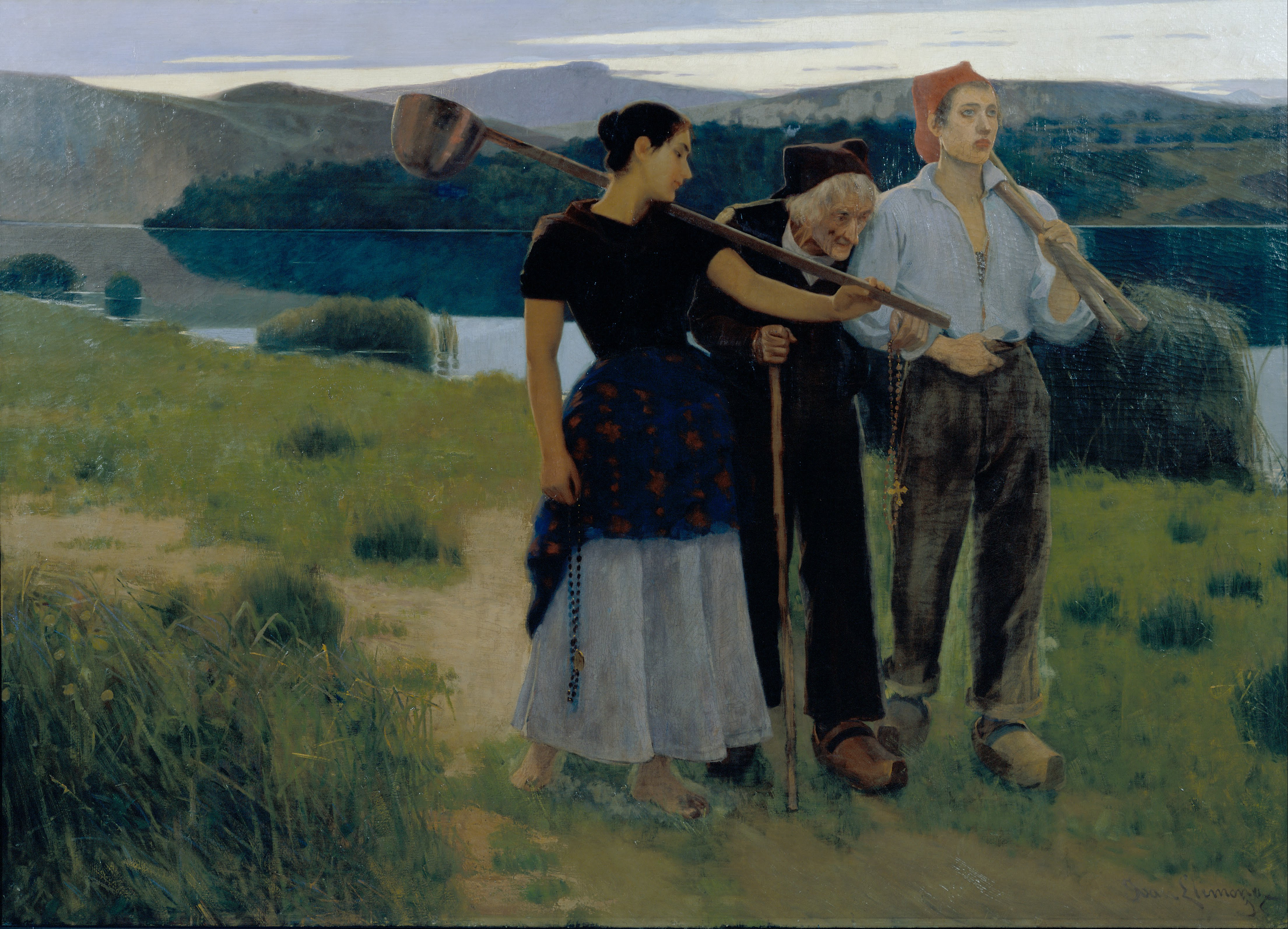
Returning from the Plot by Joan Llimona; demonstrates his mastery of technique associated with painting the outdoors

Between the summer and fall of 1882, Llimona traveled to Venice with intentions to perfect his technique. During this time, he focused on his employment of color and brightness in his paintings, fearing that his paintings were often too mundane and dull. To do this, Llimona wanted to paint outdoors and gain experience with practice strokes for different colors and strengths. Additionally, Llimona visited countless museums throughout Venice to study paintings by Veronese, Tiepoli and Tintoretto.

== Trip to Rome ==
Soon after pursuing his studies in painting, Llimona accompanied his brother to Rome. There, Jose pursued a scholarship he had won to study Roman sculpture. Upon the brothers’ arrival to Rome, the two artists were promptly welcomed into the first workshop of Enric Sierra. The brothers rented a studio in the Villa Estrollfern, an ancient villa near the Villa Borhese. This apartment functioned as Llimona's home and workshop throughout his time in Rome. During his time in Rome, Llimona spent his days working in this workshop and spent his nights at the Academy of Gigi.

Llimona spent his time in Rome awakening his interests and perfecting his techniques in painting. Here, the two brothers developed deep professional and personal relationships with other artists, both from within Catalonia and outside. One of the most influential relationships Llimona made in Rome was with Joan Carles Martí Priozzini. Correspondence between the two men demonstrates Llimona's determination to create a successful career as a painter.

In Rome during their visit, there were two dominant artistic trends: historical representations and Neapolitan depictions. Llimona married these trends with his modernist influences in many of his works post his time in Rome.

== Return to Barcelona ==
When the two brothers returned to Barcelona, Llimona was 24 years old. Upon their return, there were two dominant groups of artists in Barcelona: the more aristocratic group, which met at the Barcelona Athenaeum, and the more creaftsmen-focused group, which formed the Center Watercolour ists in the Cathedral Square. A member of the latter group, Llimona spent his time painting with a broad array of Spanish society.

In the Cathedral Square, artists, such as Llimona, came to paint models and play dominoes.

During this early stage in his career, many of Llimona's paintings are described as anecdotal with lifelike detail and dramatic environmental detail. In December 1884, Llimona participated in the Second Exhibition of Fine Arts with other prominent artists such as Baixeras, Cusachs and others.

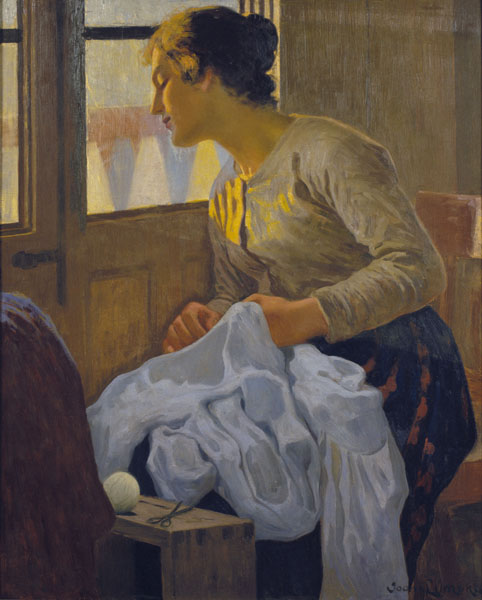
L'esposa by Juan Llimona

In 1886, he presented his painting, “At dawn” at an exhibition of the Paris Salon and in 1887 he presented his canvas painting, “migrants” for the exhibition of fine arts. Together with his painting, “The first tooth,” presented in 1889 at the Extraordinary Fine Arts, form the group of paintings that are most characteristic of the first stage of Joan Llimona.

== Styles and development ==
After 1905, Llimona's painting was clearly influenced by symbolism. Additionally after his 1890 conversion to Catholicism, his works maintained their strong religious roots.

Later in his career, Llimona published countless articles about the aesthetic presence and controversy related to the rigid interpretation of sexual morality and blasphemy. He also became a member of the “Lliga bon mot,” which loosely translates to the League of Good Word. The group functioned as a society aimed at defending the conservative and rigid concept of morality.

Additionally, Llimona and his brother co-founded, with the help of other prominent artists, the “Cercel Artistic de Sant Lluc,” which was a center for the dissemination of the traditional Catholic morality in art. The society is still active today.

== Religion ==
Although Llimona did not fully commit to religion until 1890, Catholicism deeply influenced both Llimona's personal life and work throughout his life. In 1890, Joan Llimona completely committed to his conversion to Catholicism. At this point Llimona was thirty years old, unmarried and suffering from a personal crisis. Consequently, Llimona's conversion to Catholicism is often seen as an attempt to salvage his personal life.

Many link this conversion to Llimona's trip to Rome where Llimona became ill and was treated by Dr. Josep Blanch Benedict. Benedict was a very religious man and spoke to Joan about being spiritually enlightened after following the path of the Church. His conversion to extreme Catholicism led him to believe in the pragmatic application of faith centered around the constant practice of good and protecting women, who he believed where the weakest creature and subsequently a victim of society.

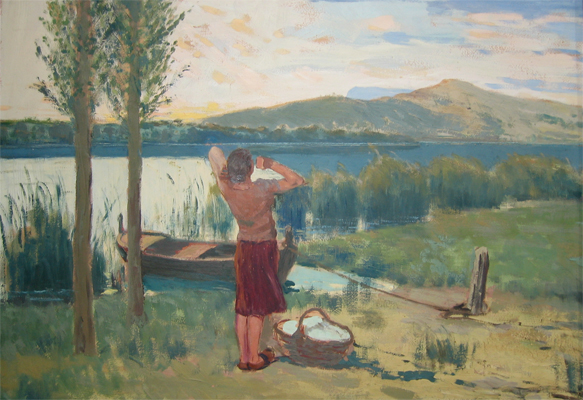

Soon, Catholicism permeated his art. Some of his works raised violent criticism, such as “The Sudden death,” which the author then decided to destroy and use it later as a canvas to pain on the 1896. During this stage in his art, the former anecdotism is mixed with Llimona's desire to express states of mind and excite charity.

== Artistic Circle of St. Luke ==
In 1893, the Llimona brothers, along with other notable artists such as Antonio Gaudí, Dionysus Baixeras and Joaquim Bancells, founded the Artistic Circle of St Luke. The organization sought to bring together Christian artists and pursued the creation of an artistic union. The values of the organization revolved around strict Catholicism and explored the intersection of religion and morality.

== Notable works ==
- "Autorretrato" 1903
- "San Felipe Neri en la consagración de la Santa Misa" 1902; en la Iglesia de San Felipe Neri, Barcelona
- "Cartell Circol S Lluc"
- "V Exposición Internacional de Arte" 1907
- "Apunte" 1917
- "El enfermo"
- "Dona estesa" 1902
- "La esposa"
- "Dalt del terrat"
- "Noia llegint" 1900-1905
- "Pensativa junto al río" 1920
- "La carta" 1905
- "Lectura" 1891
- "Mujer melancólica" 1910
- "Noia estirant-se (Chica estirándose)" 1916
- "L'ultima Pasqua"
- "Azul (chica en paisaje)"
- "Costa Tramontana mallorquina"
- "Cristo yacente"; reproduction of a sculpture by his brother, Josep Llimona, that is in the Cathedral of Barcelona
- "San José con Jesús" 1920
- "Virgen con Niño" 1920
- "San Felipe Neri and la consagración de la Santa Misa" 1902
- "Tornant del tros" 1896
- "La muerte súbita antes de ser repintada"

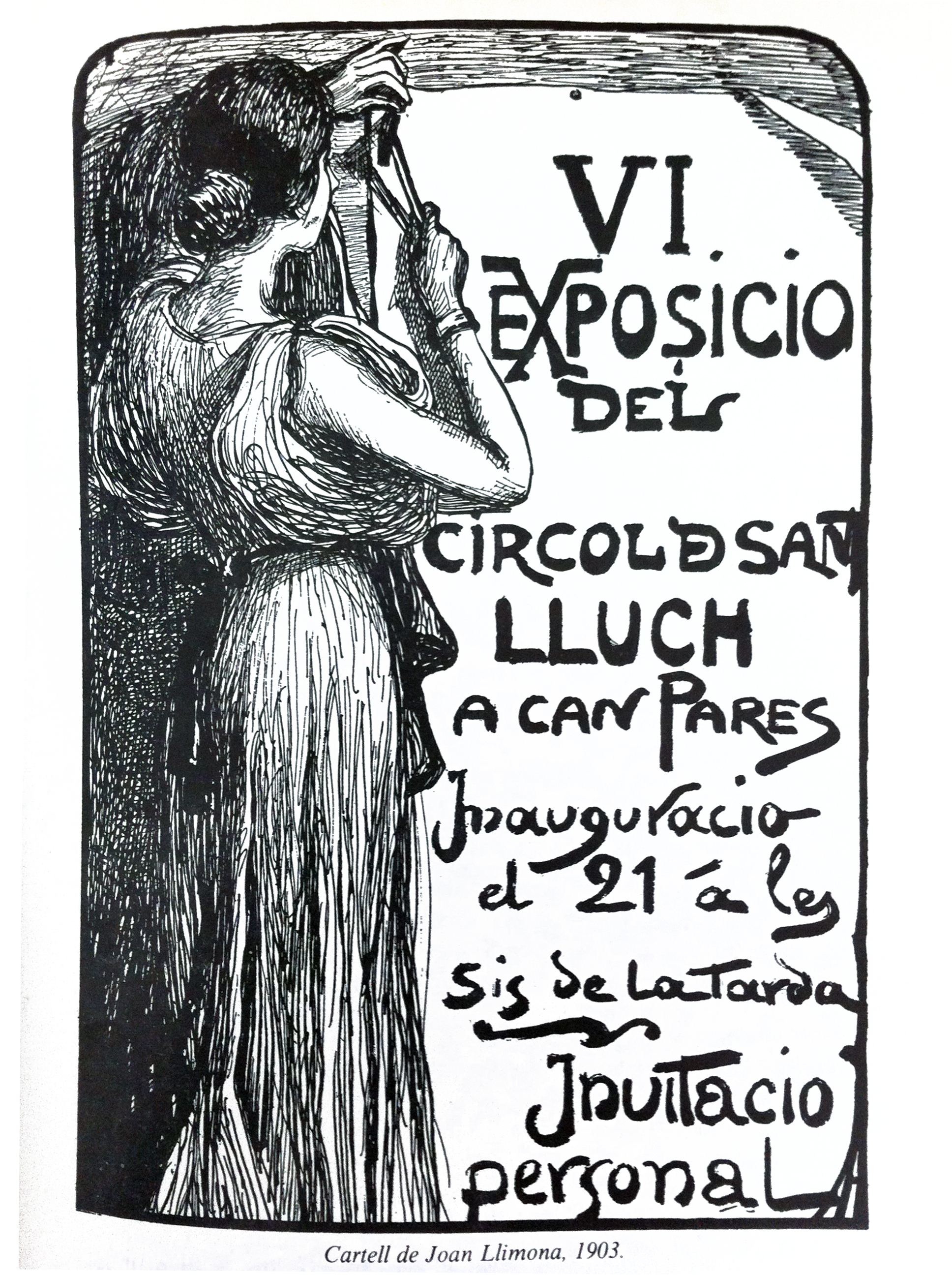

== See also ==
- List of Orientalist artists
- Orientalism
