= Banc station =

Railway station in Barcelona, Spain

Banc
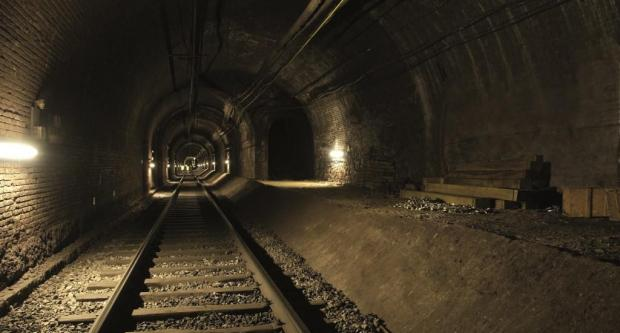

General information
- Location: Barcelona
- System: Barcelona Metro rapid transit station
- Owner: Transports Metropolitans de Barcelona
- Tracks: 1

Construction
- Structure type: Underground

Banc, also called Banco, is a defunct metro station of the Barcelona metro. Built in 1911 as part of the first Barcelona metro line, it has never been opened to the public.

== History ==
The station was built in 1911 as part of the original tunnel built in the Barcelona metro. It was named Banc (meaning bank) because it was built underneath the building of Banco de España (Bank of Spain), which today is the location of Catalunya Caixa.

The station has never been opened to the public. The tunnel and platform were built before the advent of electronic trains, and the infrastructure could not support the new technology.

The train passed through the station up until 1926, when it was converted to a storage facility.

== See also ==
- List of disused Barcelona Metro stations
- Correos (Barcelona Metro)
- Gaudí (Barcelona Metro)
