= Cercle Artístic de Sant Lluc =

Coordinates: 41°23′01″N 2°10′26″E

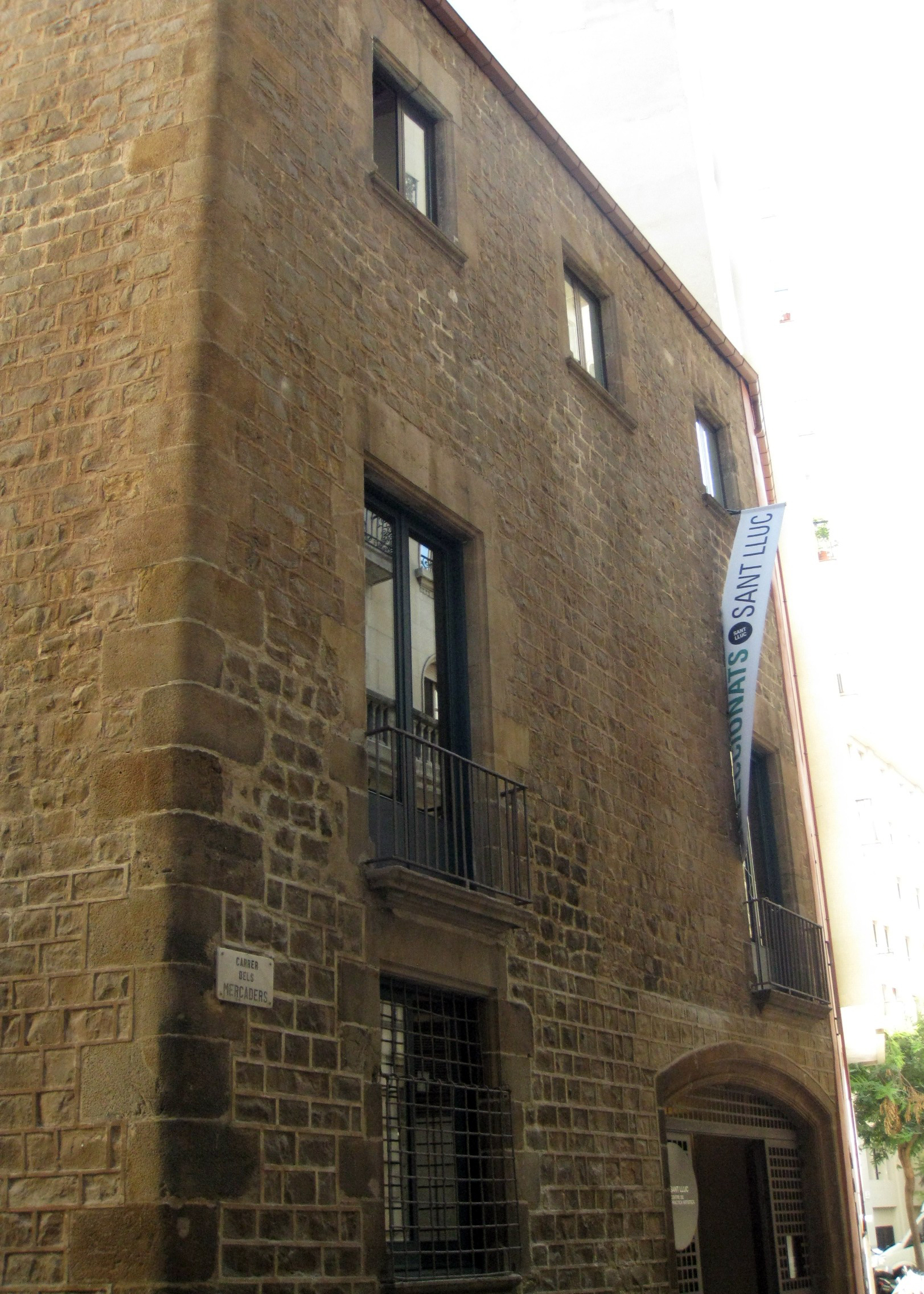
The Cercle's headquarters in 2011

The Cercle Artístic de Sant Lluc (Catalan pronunciation: [ˈseɾklə əɾˈtistiɡ də ˈsaɲ ˈʎuk], meaning in English "Saint Lluc Artists' Circle") is an arts society which was founded in Barcelona (Catalonia) in 1893 by Joan Llimona, Josep Llimona, Antoni Utrillo, Alexandre de Riquer, the city councillor Alexandre M. Pons and a group of artists who were followers of bishop Josep Torras i Bages, as a reaction to the anticlerical current present in modernisme and in the Cercle Artístic de Barcelona, which they considered to be frivolous. The society was typified by its vigorous defence of Catholic morals (even going so far as to prohibit the artistic nude) and of family virtue, and its desire to follow in the path of humility that was pursued by the mediaeval guilds.

Its president was Lluís Serrahima, and its members included Dionisio Baixeras Verdaguer, Iu Pascual, Enric Clarasó, Antoni Gaudí, Joaquim Vancells i Vieta, Joaquim Renart i Garcia and Ramon Sunyer i Clarà, as well as Joaquín Torres García, Josep Pijoan, Feliu Elias, Darius Vilàs, Francesc d'Assís Galí, Eugenio d'Ors and other artists without religious commitment who attended drawing classes there including Joan Miró. It is considered to have been very influential in defining the noucentisme movement.

After the Spanish Civil War it was reorganized and it protected the activities of the Agrupació Dramàtica de Barcelona and the Coral Sant Jordi, as well as the early performances by Els Setze Jutges and Els Joglars. It created the Joan Miró Drawing Prize and in 1993 it received the highest honour awarded by the Catalan government, the Creu de Sant Jordi.

== See also ==
- Guild of Saint Luke
