= Josep Llimona i Bruguera =

Spanish sculptor

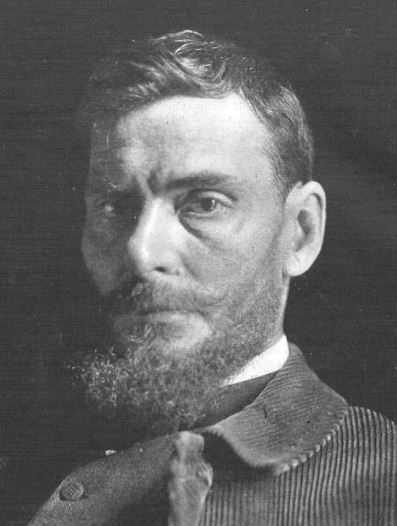
- Josep Llimona, 1907
- Born: 8 April 1864; Barcelona, Catalunya, Spain
- Died: 27 February 1934 (aged 69)
- Education: Llotja school, Barcelona; Studio of Agapit and Venaci Vallmitjana
- Known for: Sculptor

Josep Llimona i Bruguera (Catalan pronunciation: [ʒuˈzɛb ʎiˈmonə]; 8 April 1864, in Barcelona – 27 February 1934) was a Spanish sculptor. His first works were academic, but after a stay in Paris, influenced by Auguste Rodin, his style drew closer to modernisme. He was very prolific, and exhibited in Catalonia, Madrid, Paris, Brussels and Buenos Aires. Some of his monumental work is familiar to Barcelona residents and visitors alke.

== Artistic education and career ==
He studied at the Llotja School in Barcelona and in the studio of the brothers Agapit and Venaci Vallmitjana. He was also a disciple of Rossend Nobas, with whom he worked for two years, and the painter Martí i Alsina, in the school of fine arts in Barcelona. When he was 16 years old he obtained a Fortuny grant, awarded by the City Council, and moved to Rome, where as well as producing the works that were mandatory under the terms of his grant, he made an initial model for an equestrian statue of the count of Barcelona Ramon Berenguer the Great. This work earned Llimona the renewal of his grant for a further month, enabling him to remodel the statue at its definitive scale.

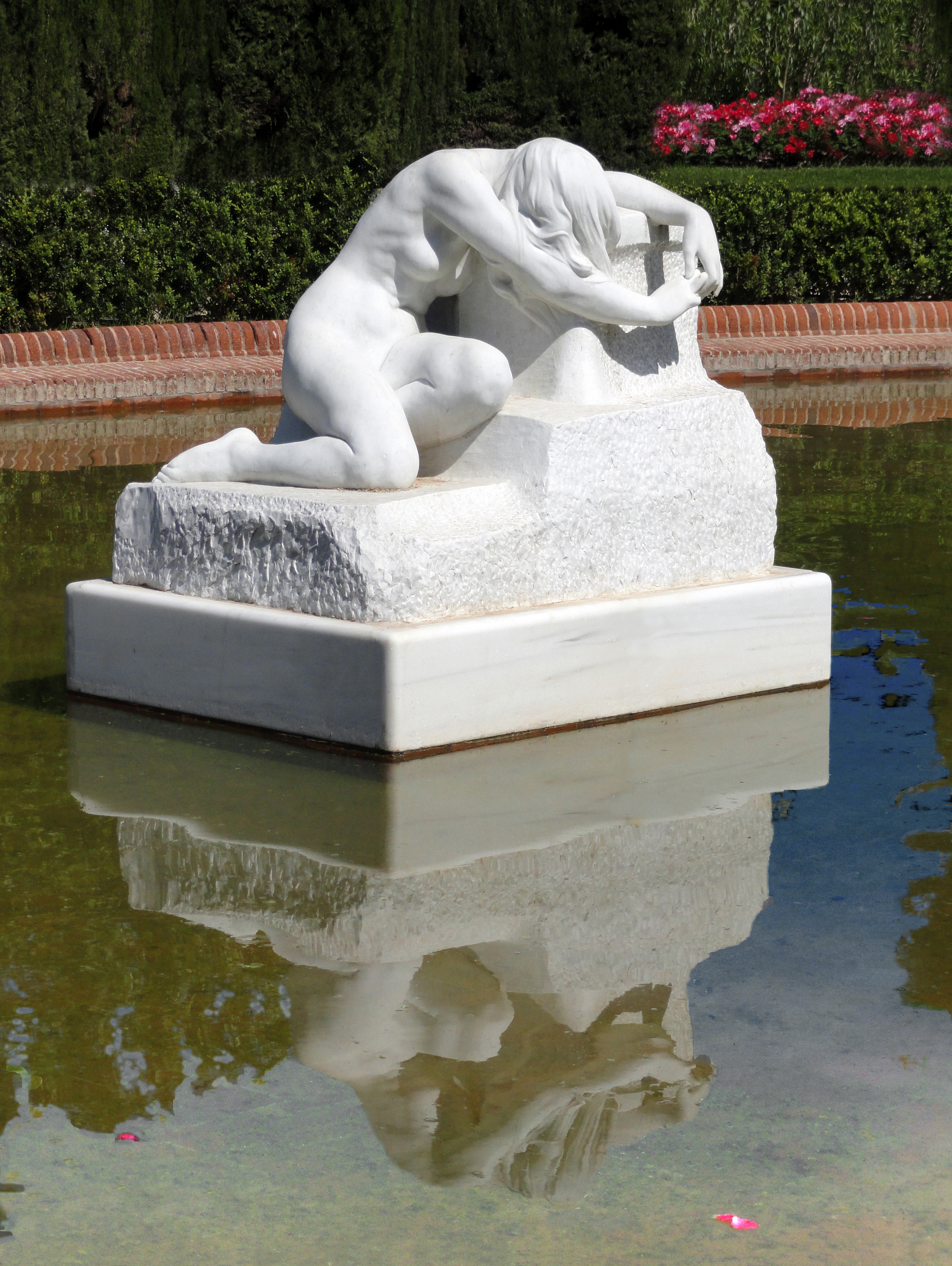
Josep Llimona, 1903, Desconsol, white marble, Parc de la Ciutadella, Barcelona

The work was shown at the Exposición Universal de Barcelona (1888), where it won a gold medal, the highest award given by the international jury for sculpture. The original became the property of the City Council, in return for the modest amount of the grant (3,600 pesetas) and it can now be seen in the Barcelona square named after the count. Almost at the same time Llimona won a competition for a statue of Ramon Berenguer the Elder, which, cast in bronze, is amongst the monuments which stand in the Saló de Sant Joan in Barcelona, and in spite of sending in his work late, he won a resounding moral victory in the competition held in Reus (Tarragona) for an equestrian statue of general Joan Prim i Prats.

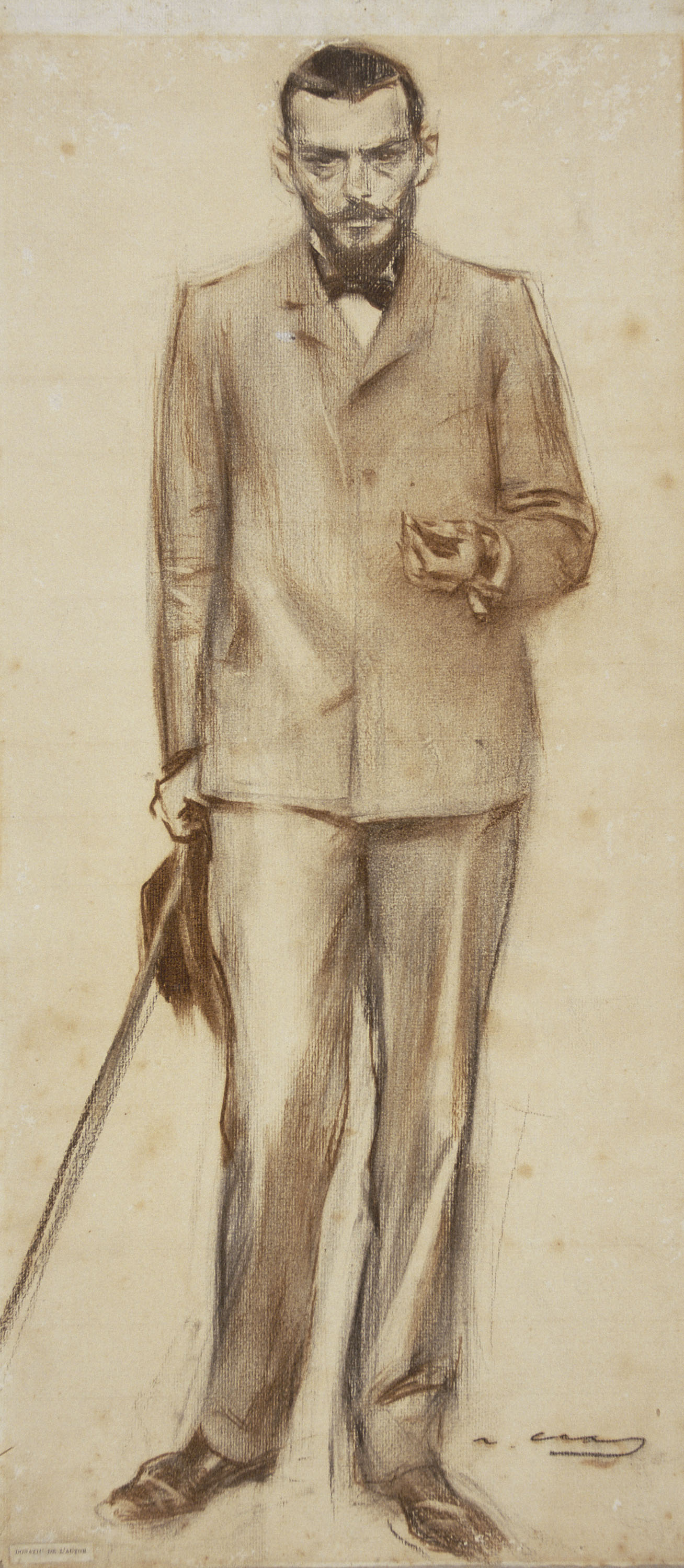
Josep Llimona seen by Ramon Casas (MNAC)

Josep Llimona also sculpted a large number of works in other genres, including Desconsol, shown in the international fine arts exhibition held in Barcelona in 1907 and acquired for the city's municipal museum; Idil·li, in a private collection in Argentina; the funerary monument of Señora de Chopitea (Buenos Aires); the group Amor a la infància, in the Bosc Schools on Montjuïc, and the great monument to Doctor Robert, originally placed in the Plaça de la Universitat in Barcelona and now in the Plaça Tetuan.

He also worked in the applied arts. Notable examples in this area are the crosier for the bishop of Vic, a coffee service that was to be offered as a gift for a royal wedding, and various pieces of jewellery whose artistic value exceeds the intrinsic value, although the latter is still considerable. Also, as a draughtsman, Llimona produced a large number of excellent life studies.

He was one of the founders, along with his brother Joan Llimona i Bruguera, of the Cercle Artístic de Sant Lluc in 1892.

== Notable works ==
- 1888 Frieze for the Arc de Triomf in Barcelona.
- 1888 Equestrian statue of Ramon Berenguer III, Count of Barcelona (cast in bronze in 1950)
- 1888 Eight reliefs for the monument to Christopher Columbus, Barcelona.
- 1890 Sacred Heart. Parish church of Terrassa.
- 1891 Modèstia. Museu Nacional d'Art de Catalunya.
- 1892 Virgin of the Rosary. Museum of the Abbey of Montserrat.
- 1893 Piélago family grave. Cemetery of Comillas, Cantabria.
- 1895 L'Àngel exterminador. Cemetery of Comillas, Cantabria.
- 1897 Saint Nicholas and the fishermen. Church of San Nicolás, Bilbao.
- 1903-1910 Monument to Dr. Robert in Barcelona.
- 1907 Desconsol. Museu Nacional d'Art de Catalunya, Barcelona.
- 1914 El forjardor (The Blacksmith). Several versions existing.
- 1914 Christ Resurrected. In collaboration with Antoni Gaudí for the Abbey of Montserrat.
- 1916 Saint George standing. Grand stairs of the Barcelona City Hall.
- 1916 Monument to José María Usandizaga. San Sebastián.
- 1920 L'enterrament de Crist Barcelona Cathedral
- 1924 Saint George on horseback. Park of Montjuïc, Barcelona.
- 1925 Female nude. Museu Nacional d'Art de Catalunya.
- 1929 Sculptural group of the Monument to the heroes of 1808.
- 1929 Judas’ kiss. Tarragona Cathedral.
- 1929 La Font. Public gardens in Buenos Aires.
- 1930 The bath. Museu Nacional d'Art de Catalunya.
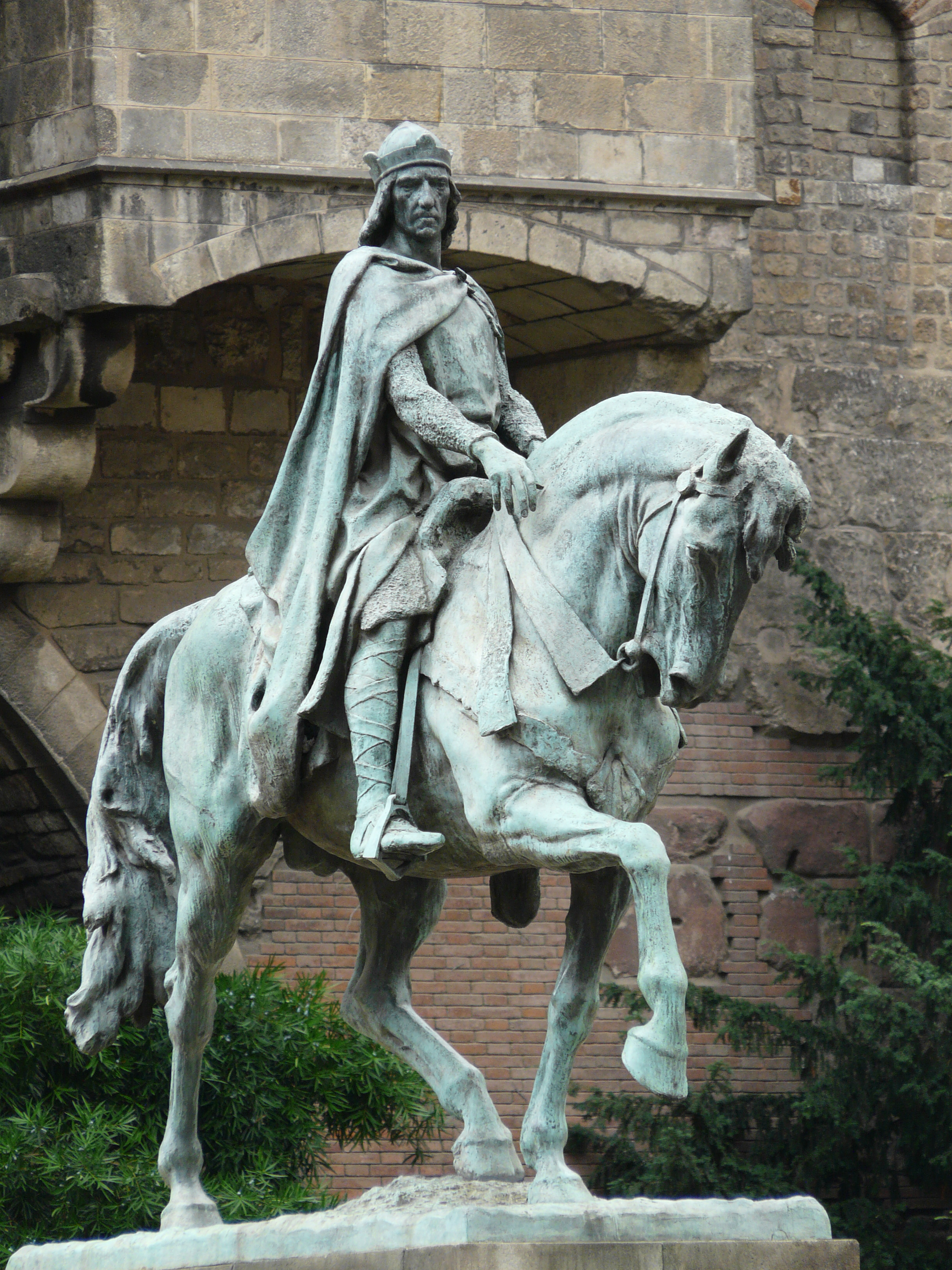
Ramon Berenguer III “the Great” in Barcelona

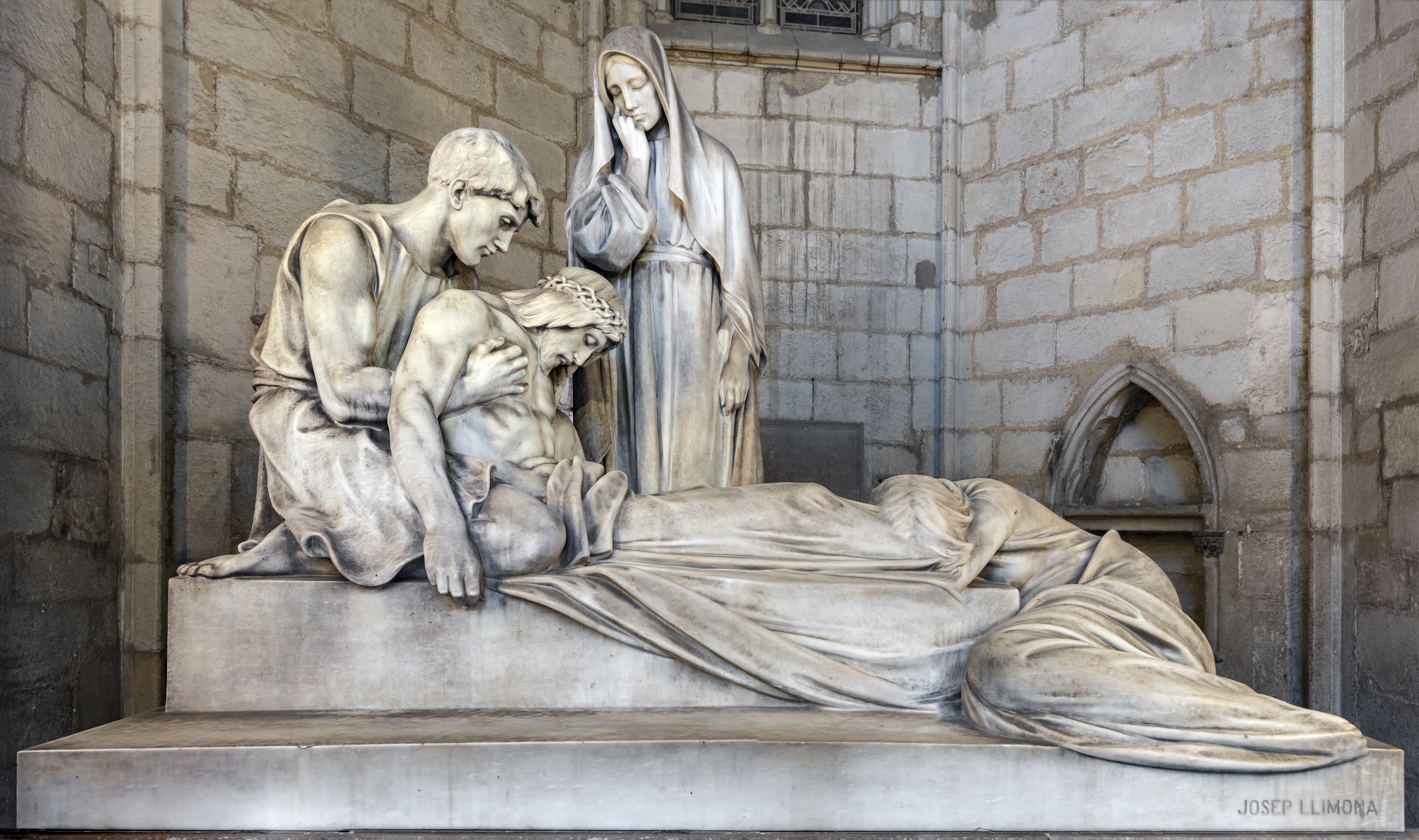
L'enterrament de Crist Barcelona Cathedral

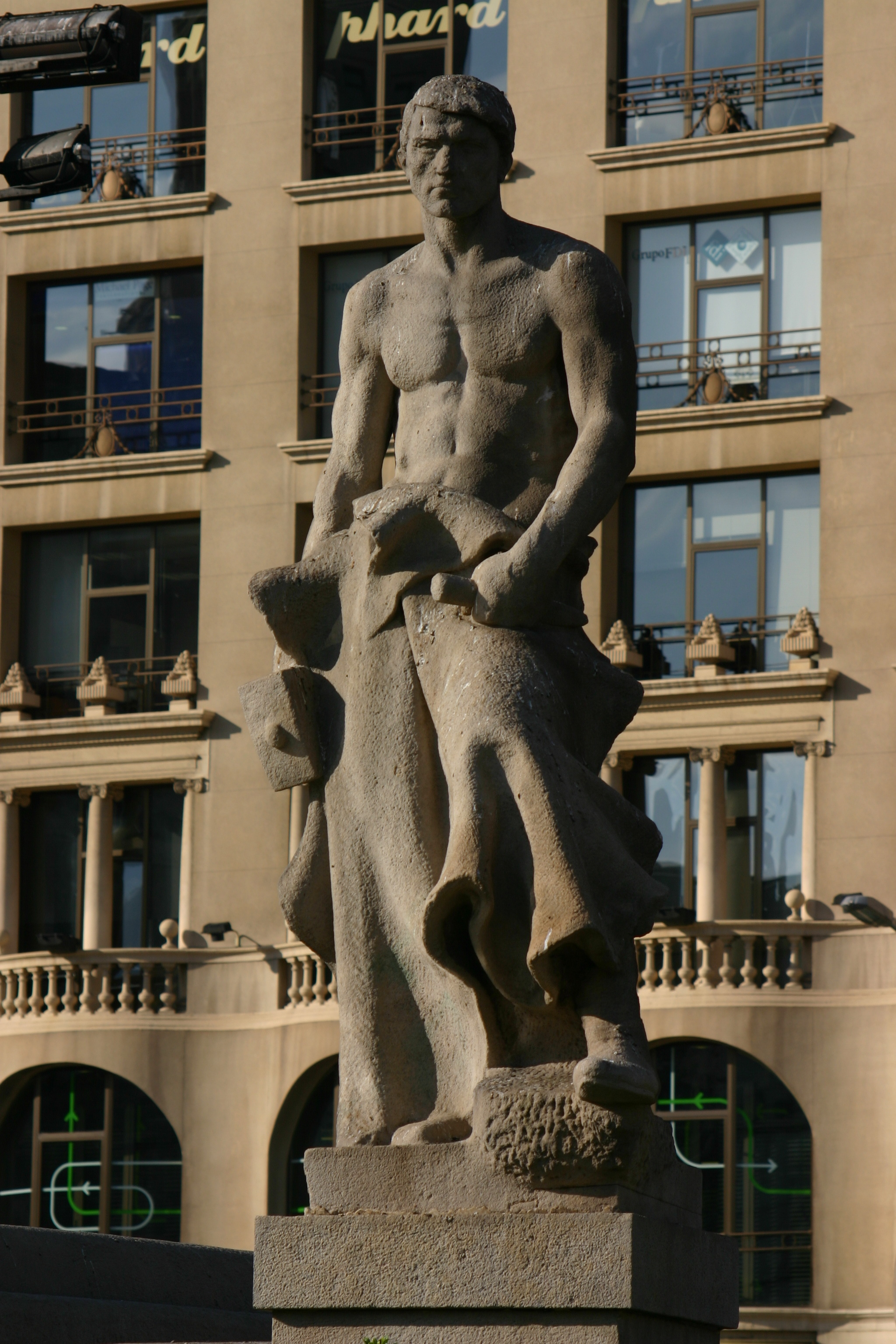
El forjador (The Blacksmith): the Plaça Catalunya stone version, Barcelona

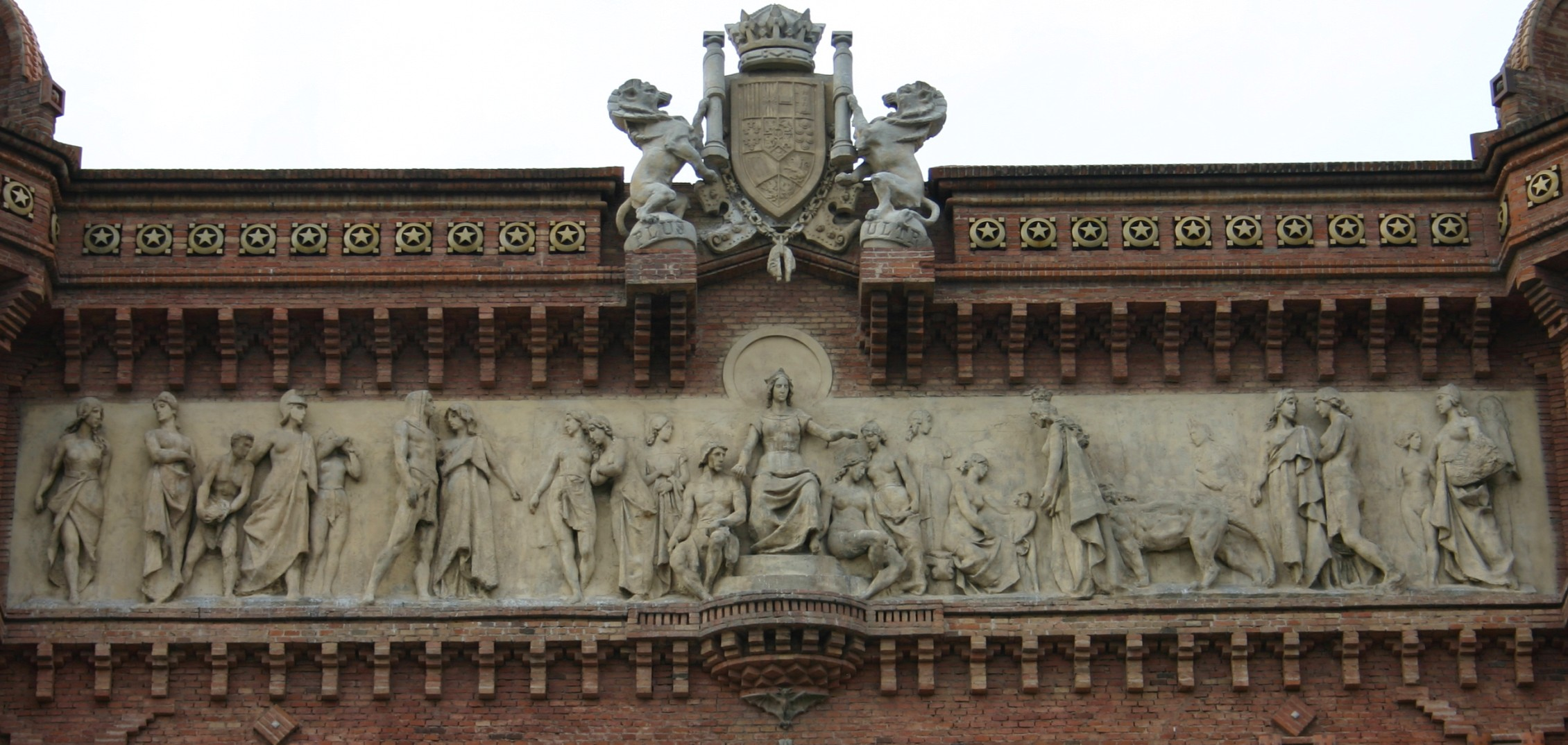
Frieze on the Arc de Triomf in Barcelona

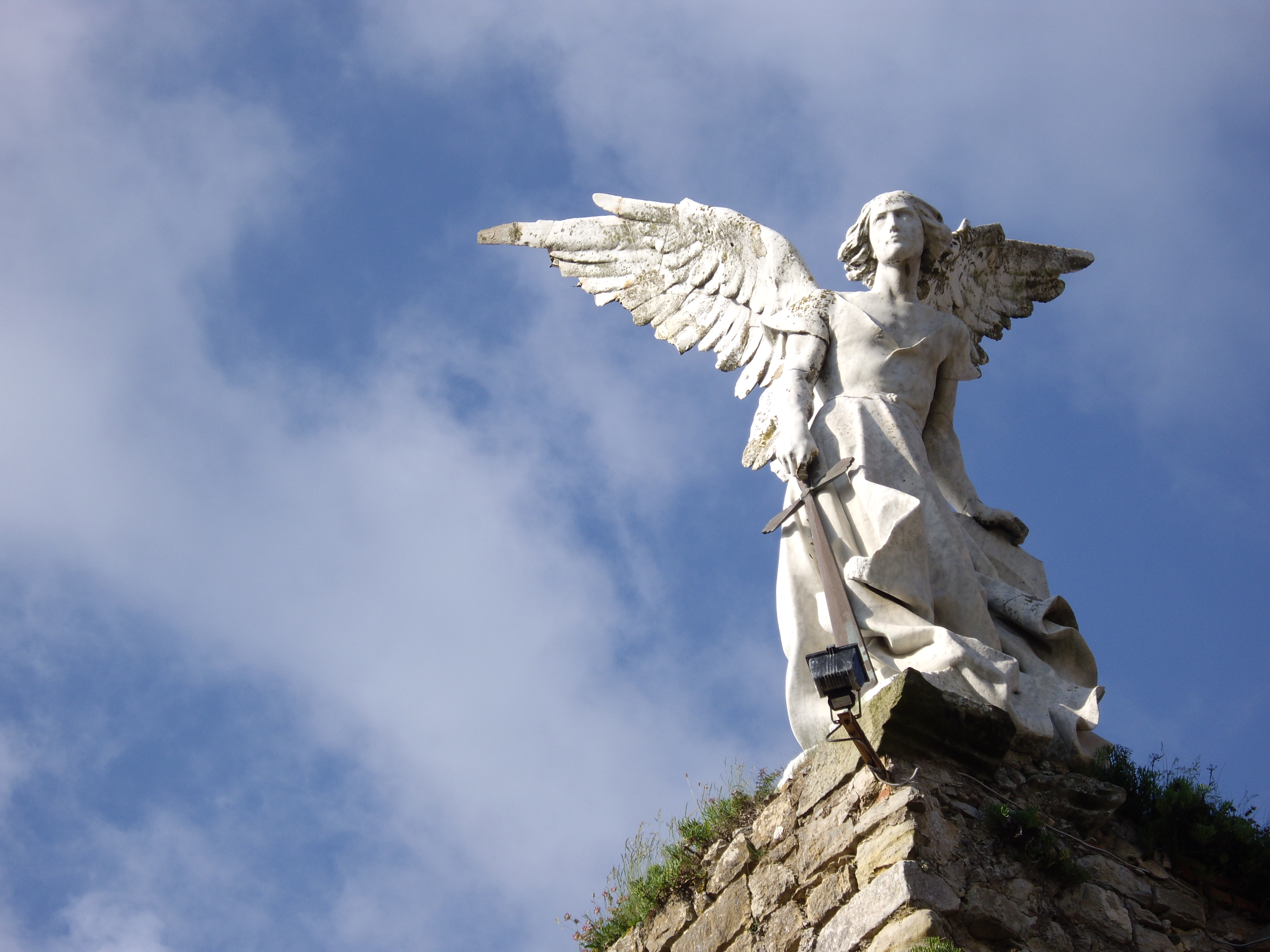
L'Àngel exterminador in the cemetery at Comillas

== See also ==
- Cercle Artístic de Sant Lluc
- Joan Llimona i Bruguera (1860-1926) (brother)

== Sources ==
Adapted from the Catalan Wikipedia

- La Gran Enciclopèdia en català Volum XII, Barcelona: Edicions 62, 2004. ISBN 84-297-5440-7
- Josefina Alix Trueba Escultura Española 1900/1936 Madrid, Ediciones El Viso, 1985. ISBN 84-7483-412-0
- Apèndix VI pag. 1350-Tom nº, 31 pags. 1044-45 de l'enciclopèdia Espasa
