= List of museums in Catalonia =

This is a list of museums in Catalonia by comarca.

== Alt Camp ==
=== Alcover ===
- Museu d'Alcover

=== Valls ===
- Museu de Valls
- Món Casteller Human Tower Museum of Catalonia (MCC)

== Alt Empordà ==
=== Cadaqués ===
- Museu de Cadaqués
- Salvador Dalí House - Portlligat Museum

=== Capmany ===
- Museu de les Aixetes

=== Castelló d'Empúries ===
- Flour Mill and Eco-Museum, Castelló d'Empúries
- Museu Parroquial "Tresor de la Catedral"
- Museu d’Història Medieval de la Cúria-Presó, s. XIV de Castelló d’Empúries (MHMCE)

=== L'Escala ===
- Anchovy and Salt Museum
- Archaeology Museum of Catalonia - Empúries
- Museu de la Moto Col·lecció Vicenç Folgado

=== Figueres ===
- Dalí Theatre and Museum (Dalí·Jewels)
- Museu de l'Empordà
- Technical Museum of the Empordà
- Museu del Joguet de Catalunya (MJC)

=== La Jonquera ===
- Exile Memorial Museum (MUME)

=== Llançà ===
- Museu de l'Aquarel·la

=== Peralada ===
- Museu del Castell de Peralada

=== Roses ===
- Museu de la Ciutadella de Roses (MCR)

== Alt Penedès ==
=== Olèrdola ===
- Archaeology Museum of Catalonia - Olèrdola

=== Vilafranca del Penedès ===
- Vinseum – Catalan Wine Cultures Museum

== Alt Urgell ==
=== La Seu d'Urgell ===
- Museu Diocesà d'Urgell

== Alta Ribagorça ==
No registered museums

== Anoia ==
=== Capellades ===
- Capellades Paper Mill Museum

=== Igualada ===
- Igualada Leather Museum
- Igualada Muleteer's Museum

== Aran ==
=== Vielha e Mijaran ===
- Musèu dera Val d'Aran

== Bages ==
=== Manresa ===
- Museu Comarcal de Manresa

=== Monistrol de Montserrat ===
- Museum of Montserrat

== Baix Camp ==
=== Cambrils ===
- Museu d'Història de Cambrils

=== Reus ===
- Museu de Reus
- Gaudí Centre

== Baix Ebre ==
=== Tortosa ===
- Museu de Tortosa

== Baix Empordà ==
=== La Bisbal d'Empordà ===
- The Terracotta Ceramics Museum

=== Castell-Platja d'Aro ===
- Doll Museum of Castell d'Aro

=== Palafrugell ===
- The Cork Museum
- Can Mario Museum
- The Josep Pla Foundation

=== Palamós ===
- The Fishing Museum

=== Palau-sator ===
- Museu Rural de Palau Sator

=== Pals ===
- Ca la Pruna - Culture Museum

=== La Pera ===
- Gala Dalí Castle Púbol

=== Sant Feliu de Guíxols ===
- Sant Feliu de Guíxols History Museum
- The Toy Museum

=== Santa Cristina d'Aro ===
- El Gran Museu de la Màgia (col·lecció Xevi)

=== Torroella de Montgrí ===
- The Museum of the Mediterranean
- Palau Solterra Museum

=== Ullastret ===
- Archaeology Museum of Catalonia - Ullastret

== Baix Llobregat ==
=== Cornellà de Llobregat ===
- Mercader Palace Museum
- Museu Agbar de les Aigües
- Museu de Matemàtiques de Catalunya (MMACA)
- Masia Museu Serra

=== Esparreguera ===
- Museu de la Colònia Sedó

=== Esplugues de Llobregat ===
- Can Tinturé Museum
- Ceramic Museum “La Rajoleta”

=== Gavà ===
- Gavà Museum and the Gavà Mines Archaeological Park
- Fundació Hervás Amezcua

=== Martorell ===
- L’Enrajolada Santacana House-Museum
- Vicenç Ros Municipal Museum

=== Molins de Rei ===
- Molins de Rei Municipal Museum

=== Pallejà ===
- Masia Museu Municipal de Pallejà

=== El Prat de Llobregat ===
- El Prat Museum

=== Sant Boi de Llobregat ===
- Sant Boi de Llobregat Museum

=== Sant Climent de Llobregat ===
- Museu d'eines del pagès

=== Sant Joan Despí ===
- Jujol Centre – Can Negre

=== Viladecans ===
- Ca n'Amat

== Baix Penedès ==
=== El Vendrell ===
- Vil·la Casals-Museu Pau Casals
- Fundació Apel·les Fenosa
- Museu Deu

== Barcelonès ==
=== Badalona ===
- Badalona Museum

=== L'Hospitalet de Llobregat ===
- L'Hospitalet Museum
- Arranz-Bravo Foundation

=== Sant Adrià de Besòs ===
- History of Immigration in Catalonia Museum
- Refugi antiaeri de la placeta Macià (RapM)

=== Santa Coloma de Gramenet ===
- Balldovina Tower Museum

== Berguedà ==
=== Berga ===
- Museu Comarcal de Berga

=== Castellar de n'Hug ===
- Museu del Ciment Asland (National Museum of Science and Industry of Catalonia)

=== Cercs ===
- Cercs Mine Museum

=== Fígols ===
- Centre d'interpretació Dinosaures Fumanya

== Cerdanya ==
=== Llívia ===
- Museu Municipal de Llívia (Esteve Pharmacy)

== Conca de Barberà ==
=== L'Espluga de Francolí ===
- Museu de la Vida Rural

=== Montblanc ===
- Museu Comarcal de la Conca de Barberà (MCCB)

== Garraf ==
=== Sitges ===
- Cau Ferrat Museum
- Maricel Museum
- Can Llopis Romanticism Museum
- Museu d'Art Contemporani de Sitges

=== Vilanova i la Geltrú ===
- Catalonia Railway Museum
- Biblioteca Museu Víctor Balaguer
- Can Papiol Romanticism Museum
- Museu de Curiositats Marineres Roig Toqués

== Garrigues ==
=== La Floresta ===
- Museu de la Pedra

=== La Granadella ===
- Museu de l'Oli de Catalunya

=== Les Borges Blanques ===
- Museu de Cal Pauet
- Museu Arqueològic de les Borges Blanques

== Garrotxa ==
=== Olot ===
- Museu Comarcal de la Garrotxa
- Museum of the Saints, Olot

== Gironès ==
=== Amer ===
- Historical Museum of the City of Girona

=== Cervià de Ter ===
- Collection Museum Raset

=== Salt ===
- Collection Museum of the Water

=== Girona ===
- Archaeology Museum of Catalonia (Girona)
- Arab Baths
- Archeological promenade along / on the medieval city walls
- Centre Bonastruc ça Porta - Jewish Heritage Museum
- Cinema Museum
- Girona Cathedral - Cathedral Art Museum
- Girona Synagogue - Old synagogue
- Museu d'Art de Girona
- History Museum of the City of Girona
- Petit Museu de la Fantasia, Col·lecció Llorenç Deulofeu (Small Fantasy Museum, Llorenç Deulofeu Collection - an indoor miniature city and doll houses)
- Treasure Museum of the Cathedral of Girona

== Maresme ==
=== Argentona ===
- Argentona Water Jug Museum

=== El Masnou ===
- El Masnou Municipal Nautical Museum

=== Premià de Mar ===
- Premià de Mar Textile Printing Museum

=== Vilassar de Dalt ===
- Cau del Cargol

== Montsià ==
=== Amposta ===
- Museu de les Terres de l'Ebre

== Osona ==
- Museu Episcopal de Vic

== Pla de l'Estany ==
=== Banyoles ===
- Museu Arqueològic Comarcal de Banyoles
- Darder Museum and Interpretation of space, both in Lake of Banyoles

== Ribera d'Ebre ==
=== Móra la Nova ===
- Railway Interpretation Centre of Móra la Nova

== Segrià ==
=== Lleida ===
- CaixaForum Lleida
- Centre d'Art la Panera
- Lleida Museum
- Petite Galerie

== Selva ==
=== Arbúcies ===
- Museu Etnològic del Montseny, la Gabella (MEMGA)

=== Breda ===
- Josep Aragay Museum

=== Cassà de la Selva ===
- Art Park

=== Sant Hilari Sacalm ===
- Collection Municipal Museum Guilleries

=== Santa Coloma de Farners ===
- Collection of the Museum Trias of Cookies

=== Sils ===
- Collection Salvador Claret Automobile

=== Tossa de Mar ===
- Collection of Mediterranean Lighthouse Interpretation
- Municipal Museum of Tossa (Work Chagall)
- Maritime Museum Collection - Can Garriga in Lloret de Mar

== Solsonès ==
=== Solsona ===
- Museu Diocesà i Comarcal de Solsona

== Tarragonès ==
=== Tarragona ===
- National Archaeological Museum of Tarragona
- Museu d'Art Modern de Tarragona

== Urgell ==
=== Tàrrega ===
- Museu Comarcal de l'Urgell

=== Verdú ===
- Museum of Toys and Automata

== Vallès Occidental ==
=== Castellbisbal ===
- Museu de la Pagesia
- Museu del Tractor d'Època

=== Cerdanyola del Vallès ===
- Cerdanyola Art Museum
- Ca n'Oliver Iberian Settlement and Museum
- Cerdanyola Museum

=== Montcada i Reixac ===
- Montcada Municipal Museum

=== Ripollet ===
- Molí d'en Rata Heritage Interpretation Centre

=== Rubí ===
- Rubí Municipal Museum

=== Sabadell ===
- Sabadell Art Museum (MAS)
- Sabadell History Museum (MHS)
- Museu de l'Institut Català de Paleontologia Miquel Crusafont
- Museu d'Eines del Camp

=== Sant Cugat del Vallès ===
- Sant Cugat Museum

=== Terrassa ===
- National Museum of Science and Industry of Catalonia (mNACTEC)
- Terrassa Museum
- Textile Museum and Documentation Centre

== Vallès Oriental ==
=== Granollers ===
- Granollers Museum
- Granollers Museum of Natural Sciences
