= Mataró (locomotive) =

British-built Spanish steam locomotive

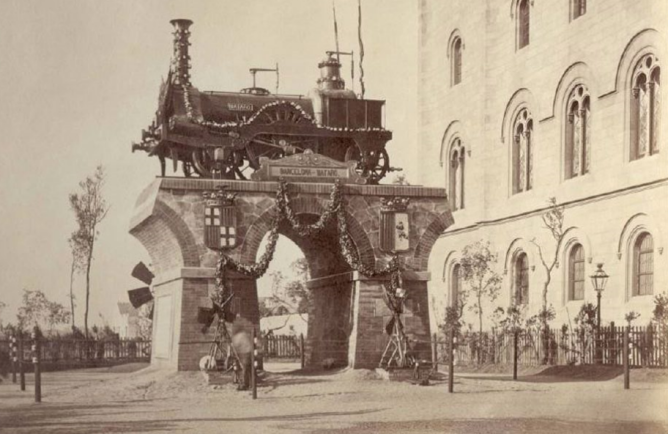
- The original Mataró locomotive on its monument, c. 1878
Type and origin
- Power type: Steam
- Builder: Jones, Turner and Evans
Specifications
- Configuration
  - Whyte: 2-2-2
  - UIC: 1A1 n2
- Gauge: 1,668 mm (5 ft 5 21/32 in) Iberian gauge
- Length
  - Over buffers: 11.898 m (39.04 ft)
- Fuel type: Coal
- Fuel capacity: 1 1/2 metric tons (1.5 long tons)
- Water cap.: 2,430 L (530 imp gal; 640 US gal)
- Firebox
  - Grate area: 0.98 m^{2} (10.5 sq ft)
- Boiler
  - Tube plates: 3.038 m (9.97 ft)
  - Small tubes: 158 (original); 4.445 cm (1.750 in); 144 (replica)
- Heating surface
  - Firebox: 0.914 m × 1.066 m × 1.117 m (3 ft 0 in × 3 ft 6.0 in × 3 ft 8.0 in)
  - Flues: 3 m (9.8 ft)
- Cylinders: Two, outside
- Cylinder size: 15 in × 20 in (380 mm × 510 mm)
- Valve gear: Stephenson valve gear
Performance figures
- Maximum speed: 90 km/h (56 mph)
- Power output: 250 hp (190 kW)
Career
- Official name: Mataró
- Nicknames: La Mataró
- First run: October 28, 1848
- Retired: 1865
- Disposition: Original scrapped Replica under restoration

Mataró, also known as La Mataró, is a British-built steam locomotive which pulled the first train across peninsular Spain on October 28, 1848. The locomotive was built by Jones, Turner and Evans as a Crewe type locomotive. From the late 1840s to the mid 1860s, the locomotive suffered mechanical problems, and was taken out of service indefinitely in 1865. The locomotive was placed on a monument for the Exposición Catalana de 1877 (lit. 'Catalan Exhibition of 1877'); the locomotive fell off of the monument after the exhibition, and was subsequently scrapped. In 1948, a replica of the locomotive was built, which was used for the Tren del Centenario (lit. 'Centenary Train').

== Original locomotive ==
The railroad line between Barcelona and Mataró began construction in June 1847. New rolling stock was built for the railroad line, including four locomotives built by Jones, Turner and Evans; the locomotives were given the nameplates Barcelona, Cataluña, Besos, and Mataró. Mataró was built as a Crewe type locomotive. Both the railroad line and locomotives were built to Iberian gauge; the project was briefly approved to use standard gauge on March 20, 1847, but was rescinded on February 28, 1848, to prevent the isolation of the railroad line from the existing lines. The existing tracks and the locomotives—both of which were built for standard gauge—were modified for Iberian gauge.

Two tests were performed on the line on October 8 and October 11, 1848; during the second test, the line's route was completed in 36 minutes. The line was inaugurated on October 28, 1848; Mataró pulled the line's inaugural train, which was also the first train to cross peninsular Spain. On October 28, at 9 a.m., an inaugural ceremony began; the four locomotives were blessed and baptized by prelates and priests. (Note: At the time, the locomotives had been attributed with demonic qualities, due to the fear of the unknown regarding the new railroad line. The trains were stoned as they passed, while songs were sung; one of the songs sung in Badalona was "El carril de Mataró / lleva cuernos, lleva cuernos / el carril de Mataró / lleva cuernos y yo no." (lit. '"The Mataró line / carries horns, carries horns / the Mataró line / carries horns, and I don't."')) The ceremony ended at 10 a.m., when the passengers boarded the first class carriages. The train consisted of the Mataró locomotive and twenty-four passenger carriages which carried about nine hundred people. There were seven stations on the 28-kilometer (17 mi) line during the inauguration: Barcelona, Badalona, Montgat, Masnou, Premià de Mar, Vilassar de Mar, and Mataró.

In early 1849, the Mataró had broken down on several occasions. An insufficient amount of water had been kept in the boiler during operations, which caused the boiler tubes and tube sheet to fail. The Mataró was taken out of service; the chief engineer for the locomotives, Joseph White, was unable to fix the locomotive. On February 8, 1850, an order was placed to Jones, Turner and Evans for two hundred new boiler tubes. The locomotive returned to service in 1863, but was taken out of service indefinitely in 1865; a new locomotive used its nameplate. The locomotive was placed on a monument when King Alfonso XII visited the Exposición Catalana de 1877 (lit. 'Catalan Exhibition of 1877'). When the locomotive was being lowered off of the monument, it fell to the ground; the locomotive was significantly damaged as a result of the accident, and was subsequently scrapped. (Note: It is unclear what happened to the locomotive immediately after the exhibition, before it was scrapped; newspapers published around the time of the exhibition, such as La Ilustración Española y Americana and Gaceta de Cataluña, suggest that the locomotive was kept in a locomotive shed at El Clot station, located in Barcelona.)

== Replica locomotive ==
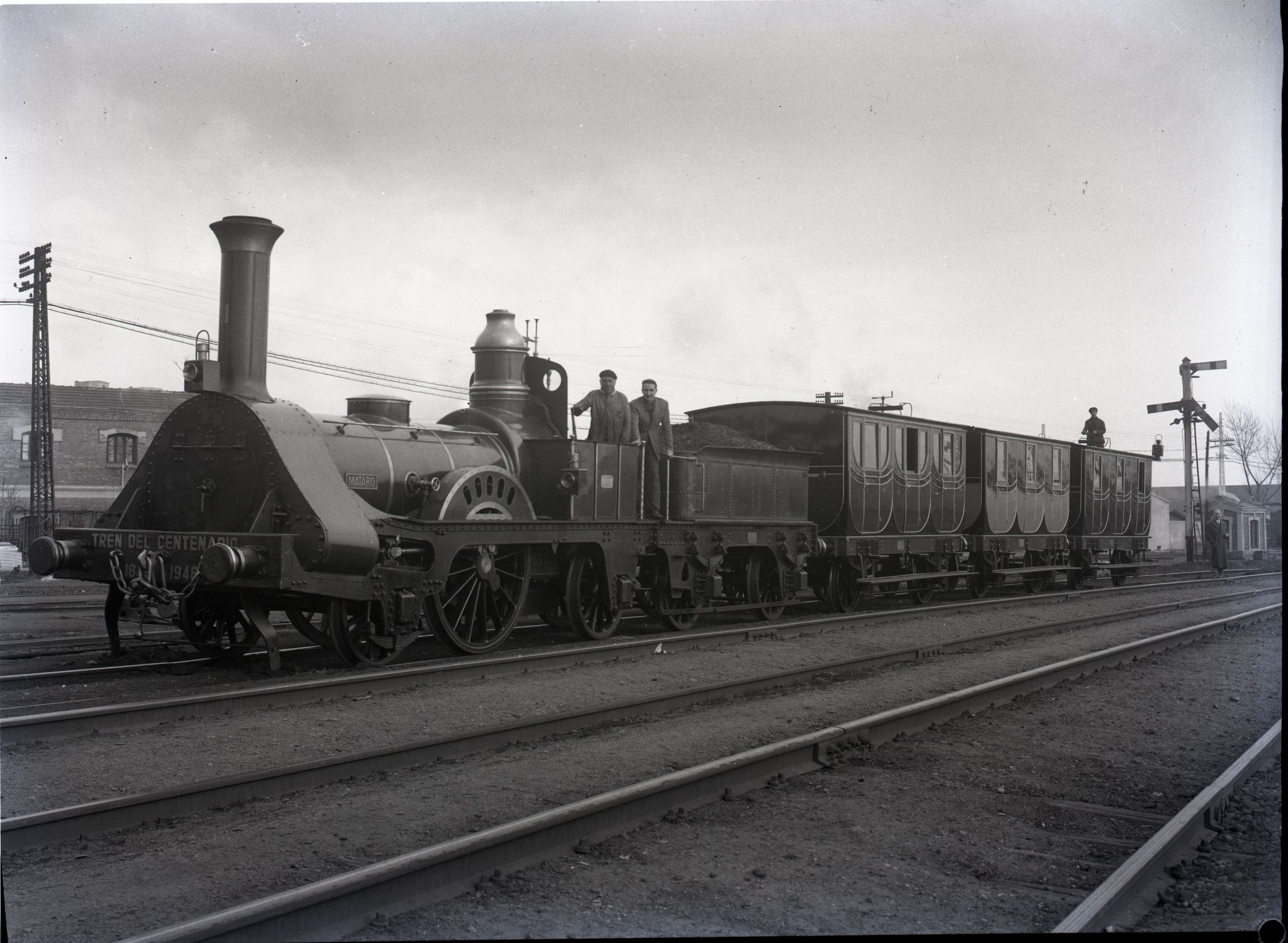
Tren del Centenario replica train at Vilanova i la Geltrú station, c. 1950s

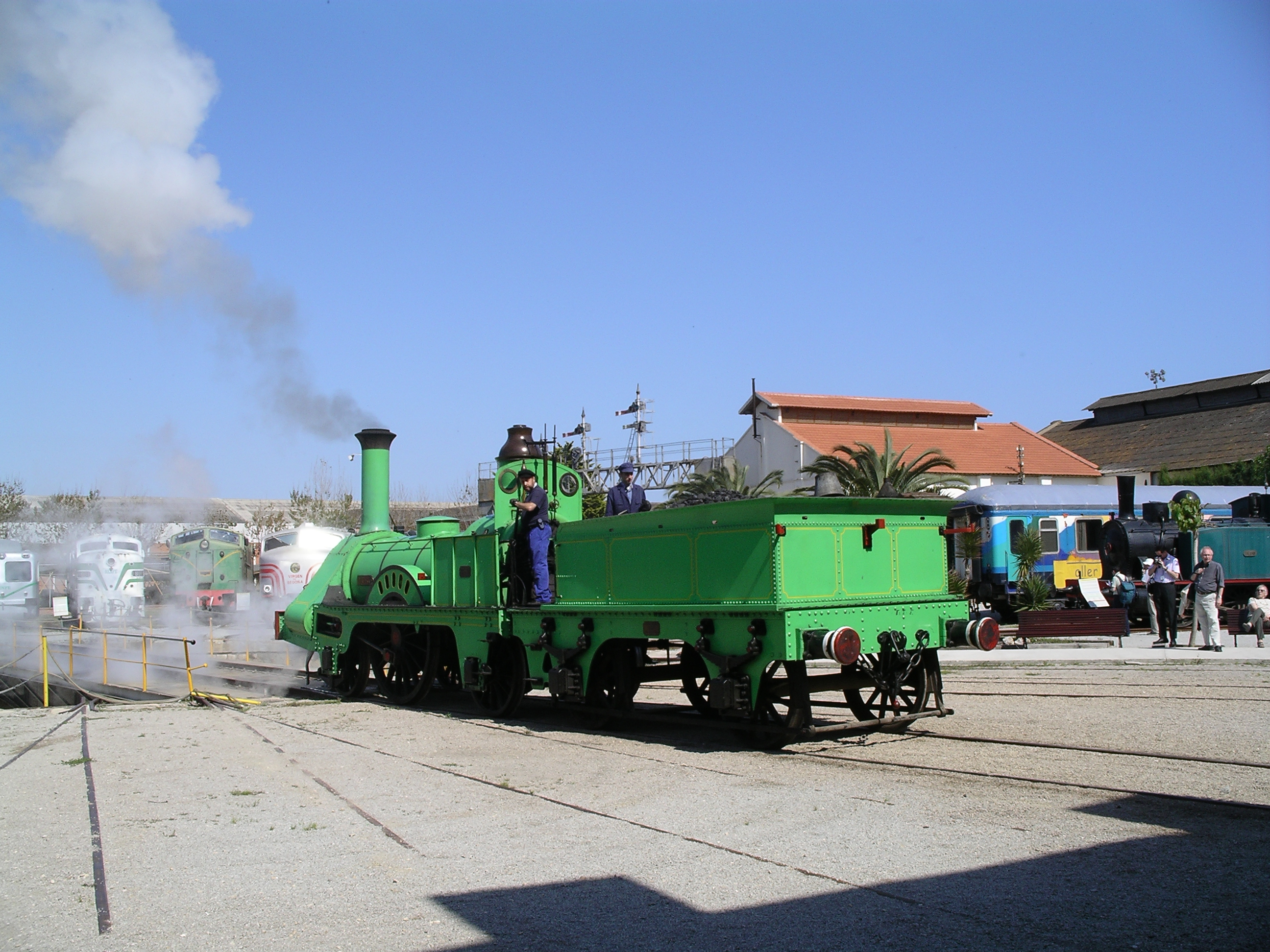
Replica locomotive at the Railway Museum of Catalonia, 2004

In 1948, the 100th anniversary (centenary) celebration of the railroad line's first train was held. A replica of the Mataró locomotive, as well as three coaches, were commissioned in 1947 by La Maquinista Terrestre y Marítima (lit. 'The Land and Maritime Machinist') and built in 1948. An event known as the Tren del Centenario (lit. 'Centenary Train') reenacted the train's first service with the new locomotive and coaches. The event was publicized with No-Do newsreels and a documentary of the Marquess of Salamanca; in addition, plaques, stamps, and coins depicting the train were created in commemoration. An exhibition was held at a locomotive shed in Barcelona, featuring other steam locomotives.

The locomotive continued its operations for events until the late 1960s, where it was stored at an unused locomotive shed in Vilanova i la Geltrú. In 1981, the locomotive was repaired by Renfe and the Condel Boiler Company. The locomotive has been used in subsequent anniversaries, and also for the opening of the Railway Museum of Catalonia in Vilanova i la Geltrú on August 3, 1990. For the 175th anniversary, the locomotive was moved to the Port of Mataró from October 27–29, 2023; the locomotive was unable to move under its own power. In 2025, the locomotive was moved to a workshop in Vilanova i la Geltrú to be restored for service. In February 2026, all of the 144 boiler tubes in the locomotive's boiler had been replaced.

== See also ==
- History of rail transport in Spain

== Sources ==
- mNACTEC (n.d.). "La Locomotora de vapor Mataró" [The Motaró steam locomotive] (PDF). Railway Museum of Catalonia (in Spanish). Vilanova i la Geltrú. pp. 2–11. Archived from the original (PDF) on November 26, 2020.
- Nubiola de Castellarnau, Xavier (2017) [2016]. "La veritable historia de la locomotora Motaró" [The true story of the Motaró locomotive]. XXXIII Sessió d'Estudis Mataronis (in Catalan). No. 33. p. 107–137.
- Méndez, Ramón; Cuéllar, Domingo (May–August 2017). "Apuntes sobre la construcción del patrimonio ferroviario en España durante el siglo XX: identidad y museos" [Notes on the construction of railway heritage in Spain during the 20th century: identity and museums] (PDF). Oculum Ensaios (in Spanish). 14 (2): 275–292. ISSN 1519-7727.
