= Salt Museum =

Salt Museum may refer to:

- Salt Museum, Pomorie near Solnitsata — the oldest city in Europe, as well as the Varna Necropolis of Varna culture
- German Salt Museum, in Lüneburg, Lower Saxony, Germany
- Salt Museum (Liverpool, New York), in Liverpool, New York, U.S.
- Strataca, formerly known as Kansas Underground Salt Museum, Hutchinson, Kansas, U.S.
- Taiwan Salt Museum, Tainan, Taiwan
- Ust-Borovaya Saltworks, formerly saltworks and now a museum in Solikamsk, Russia
- Weaver Hall Museum and Workhouse, Northwich, U.K.; formerly known as the Salt Museum
- Zigong Salt Museum, People's Republic of China

== See also ==
- Anchovy and Salt Museum, in L'Escala, Catalonia, Spain
