= Flour Mill =

A flour mill grinds cereal grain into flour and middlings.

Flour Mill or Flourmill may refer to:

== Places ==
- Flour Mill, Ipswich, a heritage-listed former mill in Australia
- Flour Mill, Ontario, a neighbourhood in Sudbury

== Other ==
- Flourmill Volcanoes, a small volcano range in British Columbia, Canada
- Flour Mills of Nigeria, a Nigerian agribusiness company

== See also ==
- Flour Mill and Eco-Museum, Castelló d'Empúries, a museum in Catalonia
