= Granollers Museum of Natural Sciences =

Coordinates: 41°36′7.06″N 2°17′15.79″E

The Granollers Museum of Natural Sciences, in Granollers (in Vallès Oriental, Catalonia, Spain), covers the fields of palaeontology, geology, botany, meteorology, and, in particular, zoology. In addition, the Museum is the headquarters of the Montseny Natural Park Documentation Centre (natural sciences section) and of the Catalan Butterfly Monitoring Scheme; it also manages the Granollers Meteorological Station and the Can Cabanyes Environmental Education Centre. The Granollers Museum of Natural Sciences, part of the Barcelona Provincial Council Local Museum Network, was from October 2008 to May 2012.

== Catalan Butterfly Monitoring Scheme ==
The Catalan Butterfly Monitoring Scheme is a project to monitor the butterfly populations in order to detect more precisely changes in their population based on weekly repetitions of visual census using fixed transects, to later relate said changes to the different environmental factors.

== Granollers Meteorological Station ==
The Granollers Meteorological Station has worked uninterruptedly since its creation, in 1950, by the Granollers Museum, and is part of the network of the National Institute of Meteorology of the Spanish Ministry of the Environment and Rural and Marine Affairs.

== Can Cabanyes Environmental Education Centre ==
The Can Cabanyes natural area is located to the south of Granollers, between the Montmeló road and the right bank of the Congost River, and gets its name from the farmhouse once located on the property. Both environmental recovery and landscape improvement measures, such as riverbank recovery, the regeneration of existing woodland and the creation of artificial wetlands, have been carried out, which has led to an increase in the naturalisation and environmental diversification of the riverbank.

== See also ==
- Granollers Museum
