= Sant Boi de Llobregat Museum =

Coordinates: 41°20′49.03″N 2°2′44.62″E

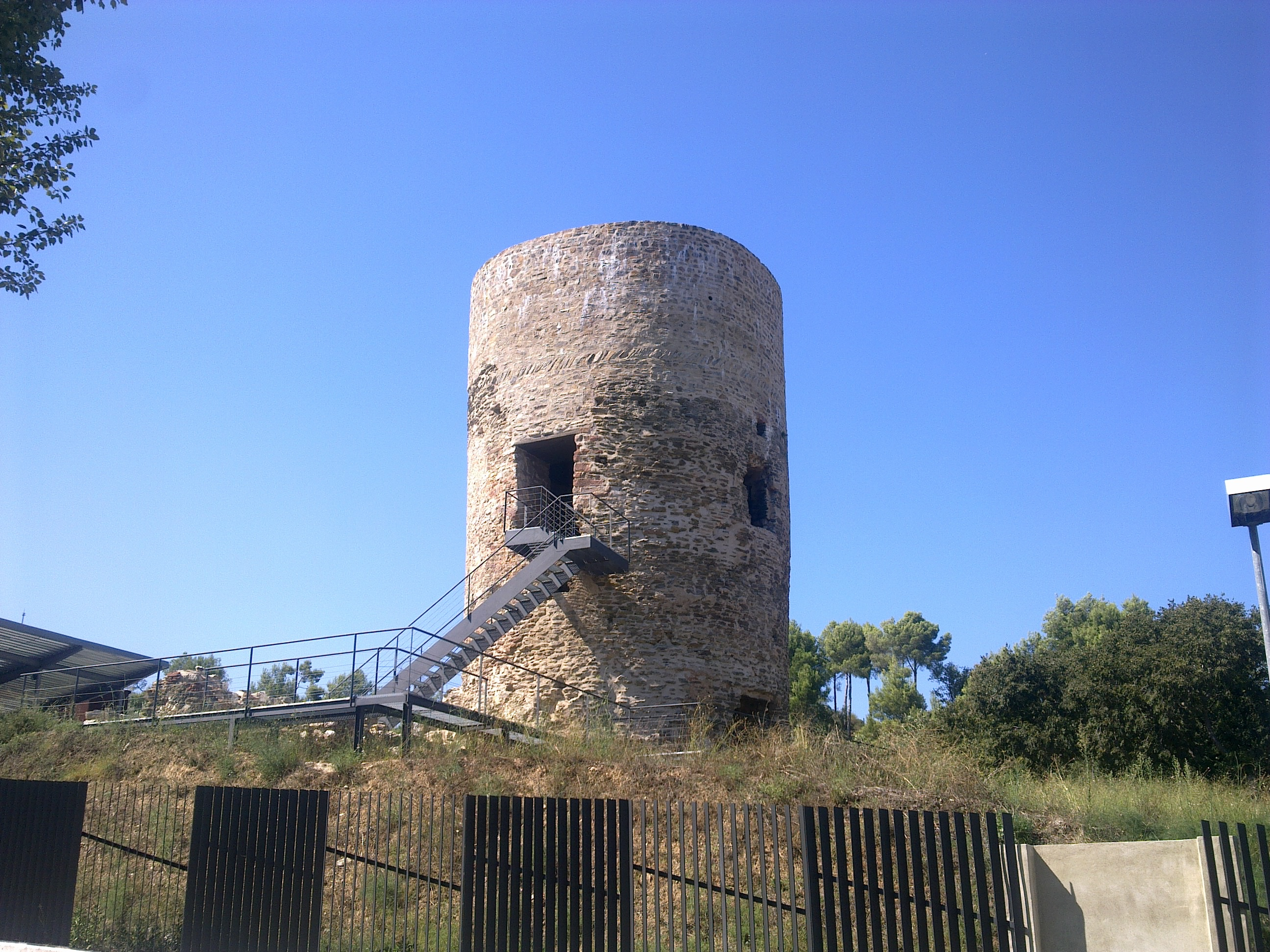
Benviure tower

The Sant Boi de Llobregat Museum (Catalan: Museu de Sant Boi) conserves and carries out research into the cultural heritage and historic memory of the town of Sant Boi de Llobregat in Catalonia, Spain. The main museum collections are those of Iberian, Roman and Medieval archaeological remains unearthed during the different excavations carried out in the town and different ethnographic sources. The museum houses the permanent exhibitions Sant Boi. Temps i espai (Sant Boi. Time and space) and Rafael Casanova i el seu temps (Rafael Casanova and the times he lived in), as well as different temporary exhibitions. Founded in 1998, the museum is part of the Barcelona Provincial Council Local Museum Network and is housed in several buildings: Can Barraquer, Can Torrents, the Roman thermal baths and Benviure tower.

== Facilities ==
=== Can Barraquer ===
Houses the Sant Boi de Llobregat Museum since 26 March 2011, Can Barraquer is a 14th-century manor house in which Rafael Casanova, the last Conseller en cap, or head minister, of the Consell de Cent (Council of One Hundred) of Barcelona, lived and died.

=== Can Torrents ===
Can Torrents is a 16th-century manor house. Formerly the museum's exhibition room, since the opening of Can Barraquer houses the museum's technical services and is the central office of the Municipal Historic Archive.

=== Roman baths ===
The Roman baths of Sant Boi are the best-preserved private baths from this time period in Catalonia. They were built towards the end of the 2nd century, during a period of economic splendour in the Llobregat valley, and the bathhouse was fully functional until the 5th century. They were unearthed in 1953 and opened as a museum in 1998.

=== Benviure tower ===
The Benviure tower is a Romanesque circular defence tower with walls nearly 2 metres thick; various excavation campaigns have uncovered remains from Iberian and Medieval times. The monument was recently restored and guided visits are given.
