= L'Hospitalet Museum =

Coordinates: 41°21′42.04″N 2°5′56.9″E

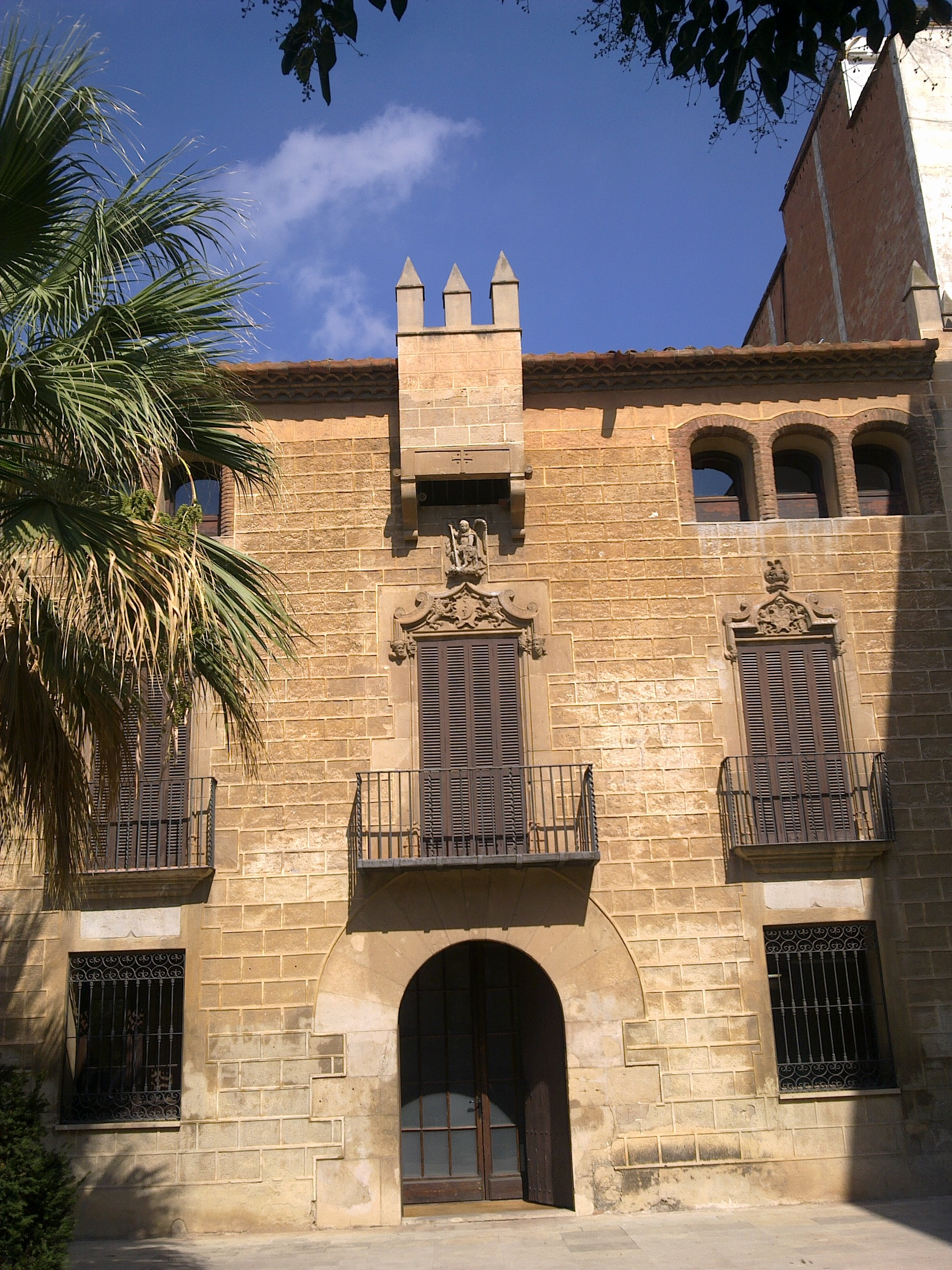
Front of Casa Espanya

The L’Hospitalet Museum, in L'Hospitalet de Llobregat (Barcelonès), is a municipally owned cultural facility that aims to disseminate and conserve the cultural heritage and resources of L'Hospitalet. The museum was opened in 1972 in Casa Espanya, built in the 16th century, and is part of the Barcelona Provincial Council Local Museum Network.

The L'Hospitalet Museum currently has three centres:

- Casa Espanya – History Area
- L’Harmonia – Art Area
- Can Riera – Collective Memory Area

== Collection ==
The museum collections are highly diverse: they have a contemporary art collection that is periodically exhibited in temporary exhibitions, which comprises works by artists from the second half of the 20th century, such as Dalí, Miró, Tàpies, Guinovart, Solanich, Manolo Hugué and Josep Serra, among others, in addition to a collection of religious altarpieces from the 16th and 17th centuries from the old church of Santa Eulàlia de Mèrida, among which the altarpiece of Saint Roch and that of the souls, attributed to Jaume Huguet I and Jaume Huguet II, are of particular note.

== See also ==
- Arranz-Bravo Foundation
