= Verdú =

- Municipality
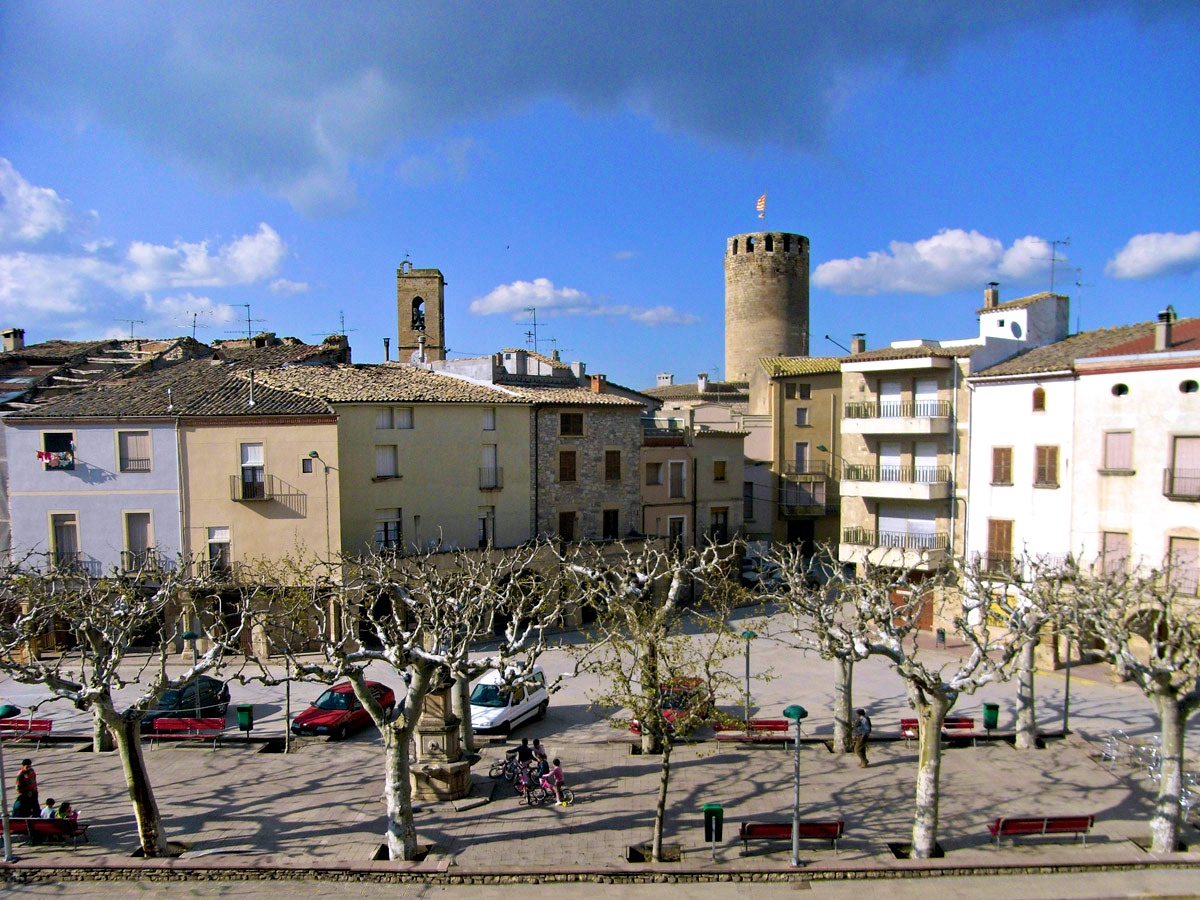
- Plaça Major in Verdú

- Coat of arms

- Location in Catalonia
- Coordinates: 41.61°N 1.144°E
- Country: Spain
- Autonomous community: Catalonia
- Province: Lleida
- Comarca: Urgell

Government
  - Mayor: Josep Mas Carpi (2015)

Area
  - Total: 35.8 km^{2} (13.8 sq mi)

Population (2025-01-01)
  - Total: 876
  - Density: 24.5/km^{2} (63.4/sq mi)
- Time zone: UTC+1 (CET)
  - Summer (DST): UTC+2 (CEST)
- Climate: Cfa
- Website: verdu.cat

Verdú (Catalan pronunciation: [beɾˈðu]) is a village and municipality in the province of Lleida, in Catalonia, Spain. It is traditionally associated with the Segarra region, but in 1936 was transferred to the comarca of Urgell.

It has a population of 876 (register office, 2025).

The municipality covers 36 km^{2}. The landscape consists of rolling hills with valleys and plains cultivated with grain, vineyards, and olive and almond trees. Small forests of pine and oak are scattered throughout the area. The Segarra-Garrigues canal and the Montblanc-Tàrrega highway both bisect the municipality, passing to the west of the town.

Today Verdú is known for wine, its traditional black pottery, its historic buildings such as its Castle and the Church of Santa Maria, its notable native St. Peter Claver, and recently its toy museum, that closed in 2013 and was converted to an art gallery.

== History ==
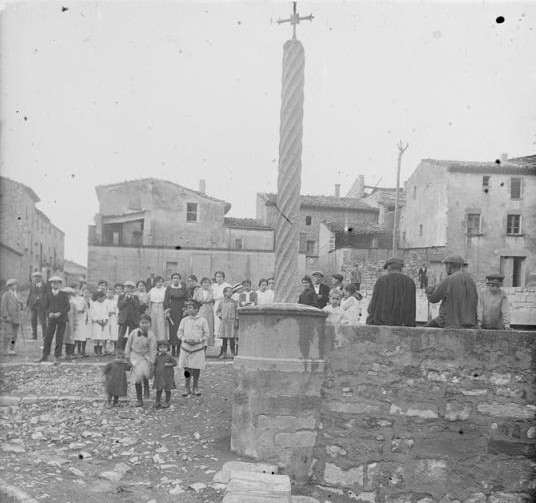
Verdú in 1916

The town is mentioned in a document from 1273. It is believed the name is derived from a Celtic name like Virodunum, meaning a fortress. It was subject to the Poblet monastery until 1835. The population of the municipality reached a peak of 2185 in 1887 but has since declined to 1002 in 2013.

Its history is marked by its membership the Poblet Monastery for six centuries (from 1227 to 1835). The population before the flood of 1184 was located in Cercavins, the river valley, beside a fountain and around the church of Santa Magdalena. After the flood that devastated three quarters of the old town, the lady and owner of Verdu, Berengaria of Cervera, made the villagers agree to move their houses above the floodplain, around the castle, which had begun to be built a century earlier.

In return, the villagers got walls and portals built surrounding the new town. Berengaria's son, Guillem of Cervera, sold the villa in Poblet. Under the auspices of the monastery, Verdú enjoyed many privileges and advantages, which made it succeed more than the surrounding cities, for many centuries. Evidence of this prosperity include the castle, the parish church, the whole streets and stately homes.

== Economy ==
The economy of Verdú is dominated by the town's pottery industry, and agriculture.

Its pottery industry traditionally produces water jars, known as càntirs, made from black clay. The industry goes back to Roman times and has been documented since the 13th century. It is celebrated annually in the Firacàntir Festival on the last weekend of April.

Its agriculture consists mainly of non-irrigated cultivation of grains (barley and wheat), grapes, almonds and olives. A local agricultural cooperative produces olive oil and sends grapes to wineries for cava (Spanish wine).

Raising of pigs, cattle, sheep and rabbits is also widely practiced, and the town is an important centre for livestock fairs.

== Architecture ==
The castle is a monumental piece of architecture. It is crowned by a cylindrical tower 25 meters tall and 25 meters in diameter, constructed in 1080. Two rooms are in the romance style of the 11 century. It is the only Catalan Gothic castle that preserves three large naves superimposed on one another. The third gothic room is Copons Abbot, recently restored, and is a Catalan Civil Gothic jewel. Around the courtyard is a gallery, with Renaissance stone steps along the tower. Downstairs, the basement was commissioned by the Verdú Cooperative, the architect being Cesar Martinell, a pupil of Antoni Gaudí, a sample of modernist architecture.

The church of Santa Maria can be dated to the late 13th century. The austerity of the Cistercian Order of the self caused it to have a single nave, but population growth led to the gradual enlargement. The image that presides over the altar stone is from the 15tyh century by Andreu Pi. It also led out the door of the sacristy. The work of the altarpiece made the painter Jaume Ferrer, one of the most famous painters in Lleida. Today, the altar is in the Episcopal Museum of Vic.

The church was expanded in accordance with the needs of the population was expanded and eventually had three naves, the central one covered with a slightly pointed barrel vault and the two sides ones gibe testimony to the time they were made. Later, the Baroque Purisima, made by Agusti Pujol in 1623, made another, in Barcelona. Another highlight is the apse of the right aisle of the church dedicated to Sant Flavia. The altarpiece disappeared during the Civil War. On the left is the tombstone consecration of the church made in 1586 by the archbishop of Tarragona, Joan Terès i Borrull, son of the town.

Also the image of St. Christ, the most valuable and most revered image in Verdú is dated from the late 13th or the early 14th century and was implored by the population of Verdú during droughts and epidemics. Also, the paintings that decorate the altar were made by the painter Jaume Minguell in 1955 and 1956. The latest work in the church has been the placement of windows, dedicated to Sant Flavia, St. Peter Claver and St. Hippolytus, in the summer of 2004. The rose window is intended as a tribute to the town.
