= Sabadell History Museum =

Coordinates: 41°32′53.36″N 2°6′27.77″E

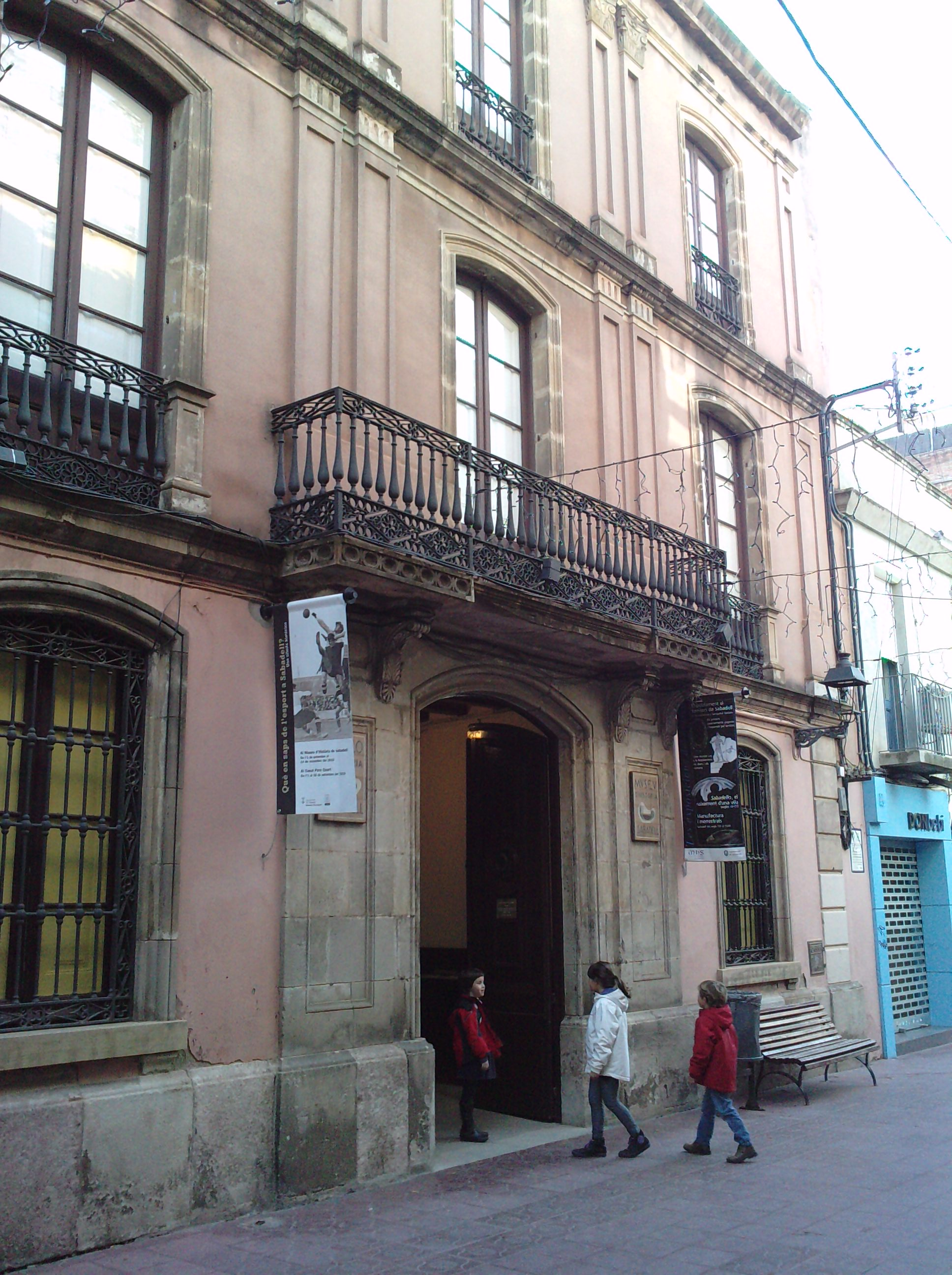
Façade of the Sabadell History Museum

The Sabadell History Museum or MHS (Catalan: Museu d'Història de Sabadell) is a pluridisciplinary museum that brings together collections on the archaeology, history and ethnology of the city of Sabadell, especially in relation to wool manufacture and the textile industry. Lectures and talks are given on subjects regarding the city's history. Entrance is free and wheelchair accessible.

The museum is part of the Barcelona Provincial Council Local Museum Network and located in an old factory house dating from 1859 that belonged to Antoni Casanovas, a Sabadell businessman.

== See also ==
- Sabadell Art Museum
