= L'Enrajolada Santacana House Museum =

Historic house museum in Martorell, Catalonia

L’Enrajolada Santacana House-Museum
- L'Enrajolada, Casa Museu Santacana
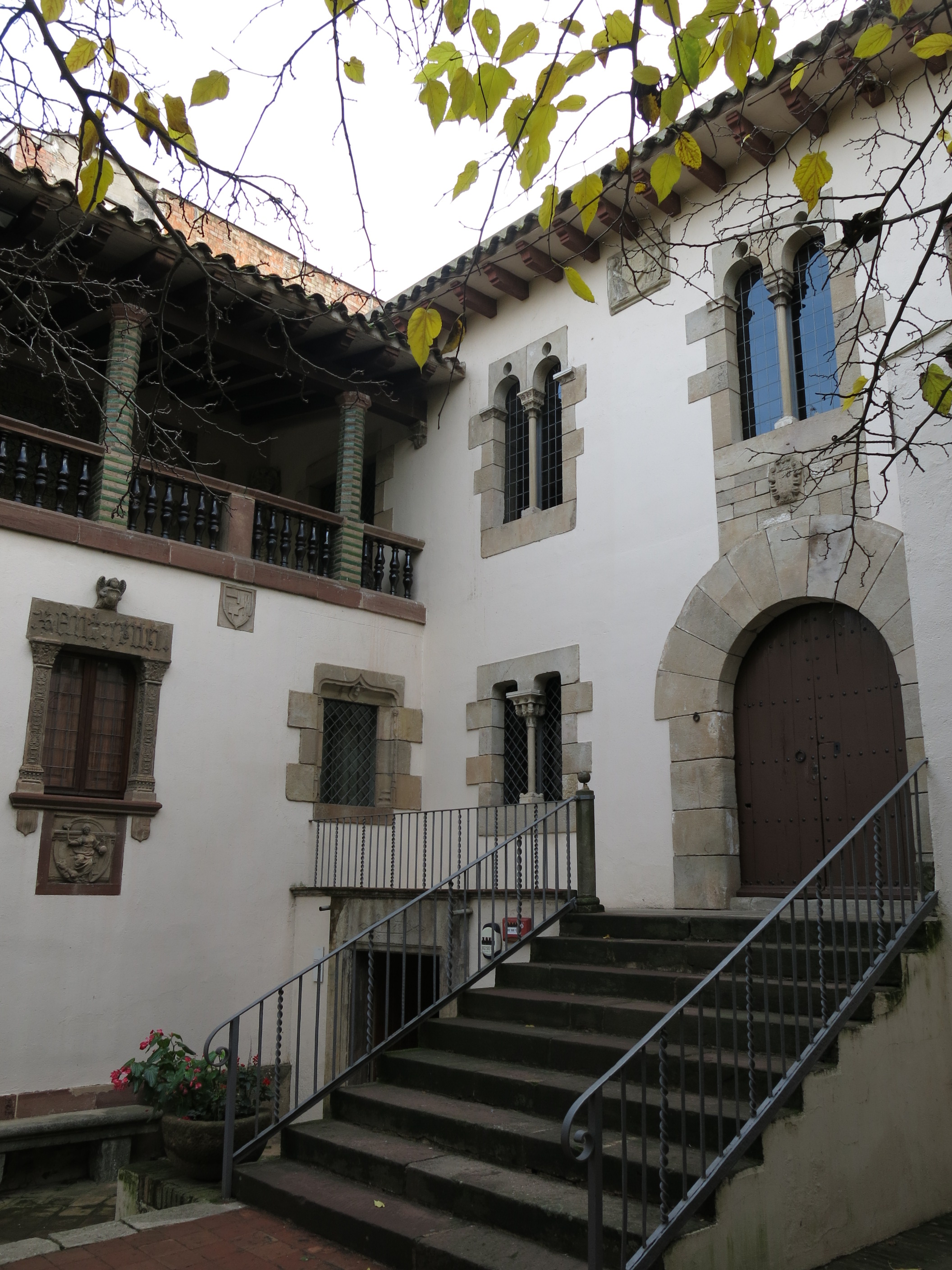
- L'Enrajolada (Martorell)
- Established: 1876
- Location: Martorell, Baix Llobregat, Catalonia, Spain
- Coordinates: 41°28′27.65″N 1°55′43.8″E
- Type: Historic house museum
- Founder: Francesc Santacana i Campmany

The L’Enrajolada Santacana House-Museum (Catalan: L'Enrajolada, Casa Museu Santacana), in Martorell (Baix Llobregat), is one of the oldest museums in Catalonia. It was founded in 1876 by Francesc Santacana i Campmany (1810-1896) and then taken over by his grandson, Francesc Santacana i Romeu (1883-1936). It is located in an old private residence with four floors and a garden, which belonged to the Santacana family. L'Enrajolada is part of the Barcelona Provincial Council Local Museum Network.

== Collection ==
The collections are very varied and come from all over: There are tiles from the 14th through to the 20th century, ceramic pieces, architectural elements and sculptures from ancient buildings, paintings from the 19th century, furniture and decorative elements. In addition, there is archaeological material from excavations carried out by Francesc Santacana in Martorell and the surrounding area.

== See also ==
- Vicenç Ros Municipal Museum
