= Petite Galerie (Lleida) =

Petite Galerie was a short-lived alternative art gallery in Lleida, Catalonia, Spain. It existed between 1968 and 1974, during the last years of the Francoist dictatorship, and was especially relevant for being the first of its kind in Catalonia, offering exhibitions of avantgarde art. It was opened as a collaboration between the local branch of Alliance Française, directed by Jaume Magre, and painters Àngel Jové and Albert Coma Estadella. The Barcelona-born artist Antoni Llena debuted there.

In 2009, the Sala Coma Estadella, a gallery in Lleida, showcased a retrospective about La Petite Gallery and Coma Estadella's works.

== See also ==
- Culture of Lleida
- Petite Galerie of the Louvre
