= Vicenç Ros Municipal Museum =

Coordinates: 41°28′23.23″N 1°55′53.79″E

The Vicenç Ros Municipal Museum, in Martorell (Baix Llobregat), occupies one of the sections of an old Capuchin convent dating back to the 17th century and is part of Barcelona Provincial Council Local Museum Network. Opened in 1945, the museum came to be thanks to Vicenç Ros i Batllevell (1883–1970), who donated his large ceramics collection. Over the years, the museum has organised its collection into different categories, which it has expanded: ethnology, art, archaeology, architecture and archives.

== The collection ==
The museum collection is made up of different smaller collections, of which ceramics, architectural and sculptural elements, ethnology and art are of particular note. The ceramics collection is the most extensive, with 350 pieces of ceramics of varying origins and styles and almost 15,000 tiles.

== See also ==
- L'Enrajolada, Santacana House-Museum. Martorell
