= Girona History Museum =

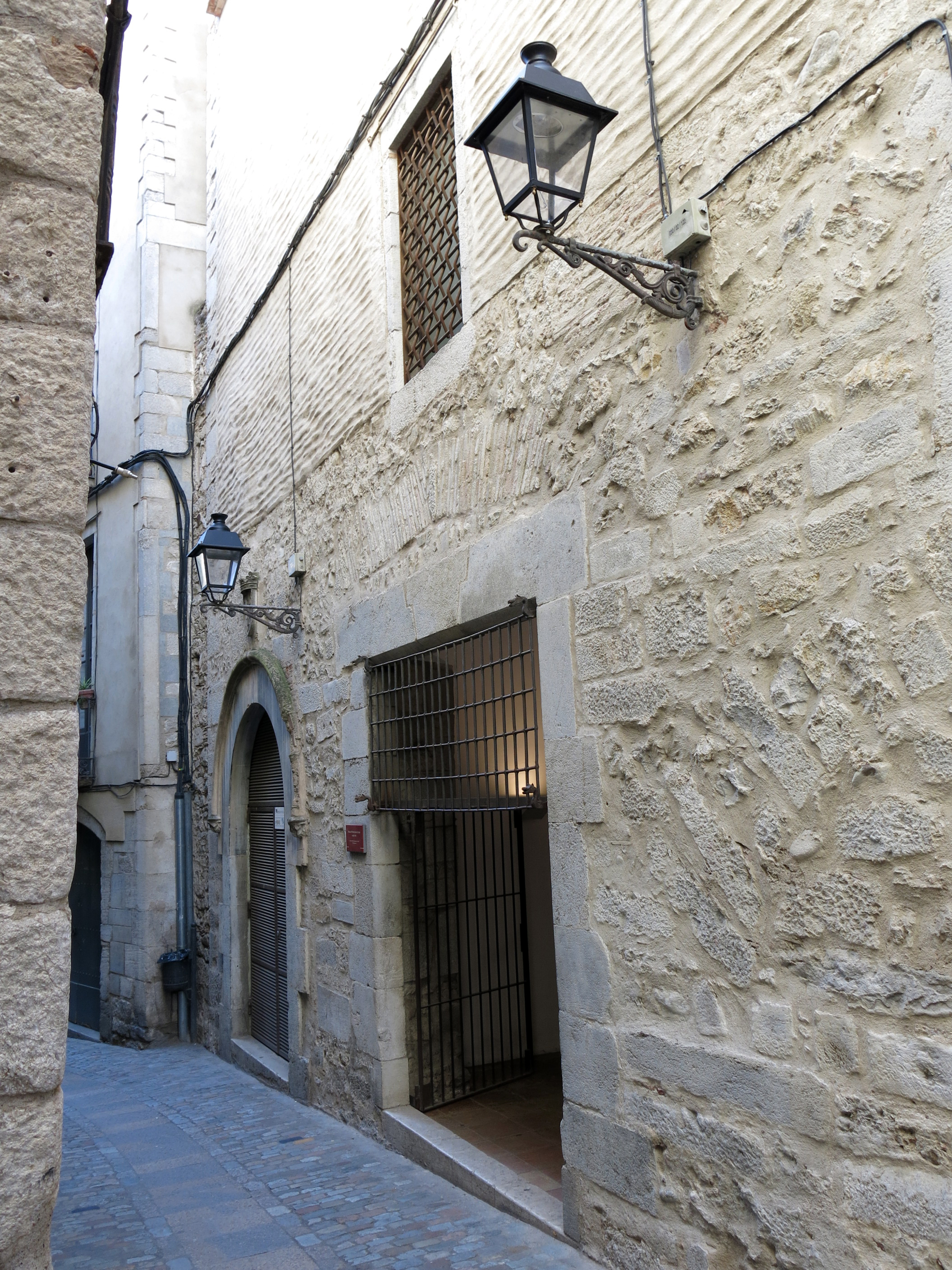
- Entry to the Girona History Museum

- Location within Province of Girona
- Established: January 8, 1960
- Location: C/ de la Força 27, Girona, Spain
- Coordinates: 41°59′13.1″N 2°49′30.3″E
- Type: History museum
- Director: Sílvia Planas Marce
- Website: www.girona.cat/museuhistoria/eng/index.php

The Girona City History Museum is a museum in the middle of the Old Town of Girona, Spain, in a unique building which used to be the convent of the Capuchin friars of Saint Anthony in 18th century, and which still conserves some surprising remnants of the time, such as the cemetery, cloister and cistern.

The museum features displays showing how Girona was founded, from the Roman period through to the transition to democracy, all in chronological order. Several subject areas are covered, including an exhibition dedicated to popular imagery in the city and a room dedicated to the Sardana (a type of circle dance typical of Catalan culture) and the Cobla (a music ensemble).

The museum exhibition spaces are located in the main building and in other areas dedicated to the Spanish Civil War, part of the Democratic Memory Spaces Network of Catalonia. These include the air-raid shelter in the 'Jardi de la Infància', the provincial prison and the common grave in the old cemetery.

The museum offers a varied programme of activities, and temporary exhibitions are held in different areas within the museum: in the exhibition hall, the coal room, the cistern and the cellar.
