= Anchovy and Salt Museum =

Museum in L'Escala, Catalonia, Spain

- Museu de l'Anxova i la Sal
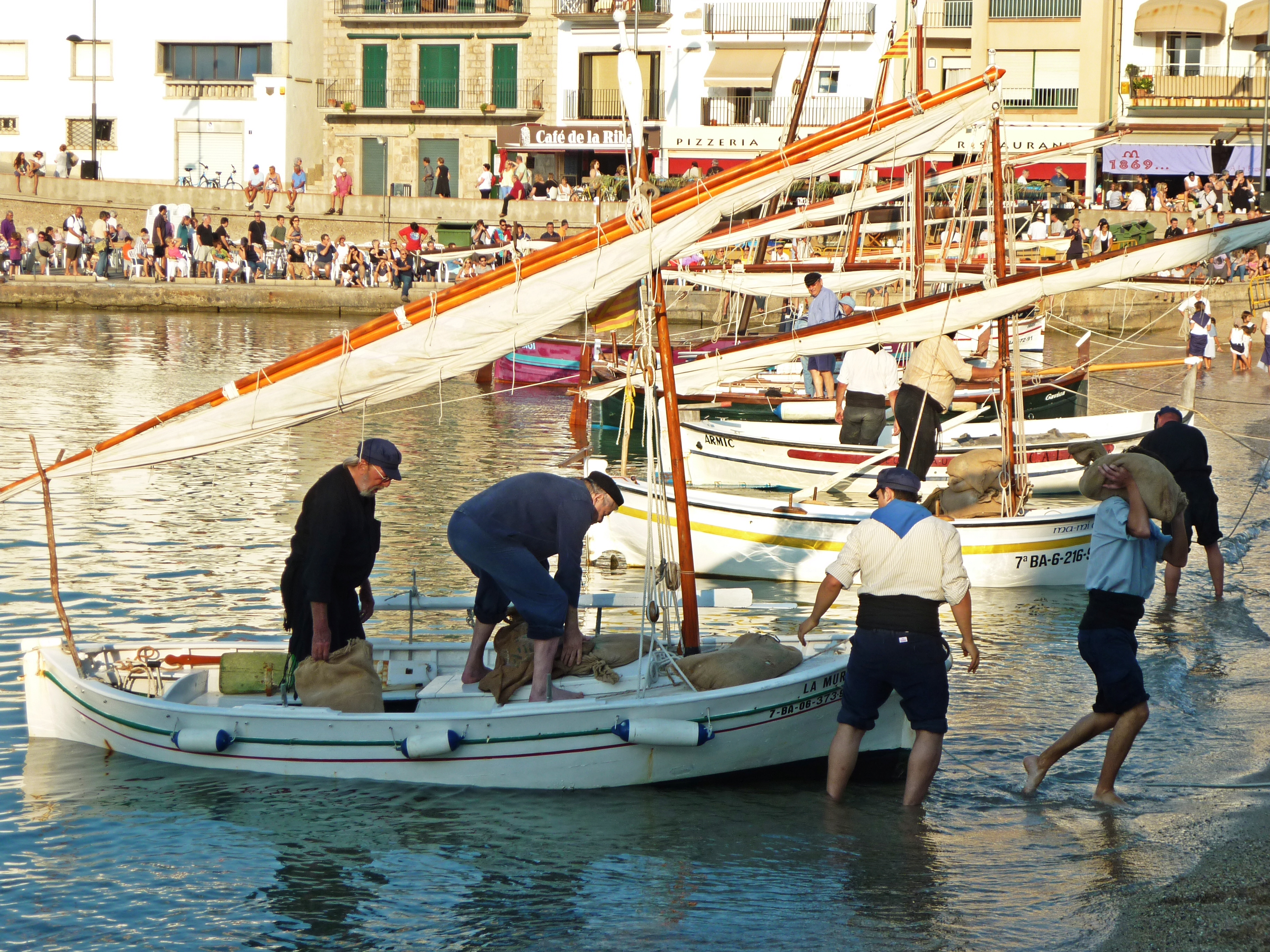
- The Salt Festival

- Location within Province of Girona
- Established: 2006
- Location: Spain, Catalonia, Girona, L'Escala, Av. Francesc Macià 1
- Coordinates: 42°07′32.8″N 3°07′34.2″E
- Type: Ethnologic
- Website: Official website

Anchovy and Salt Museum is a museum in the town of L'Escala, Catalonia, Spain. It was opened in 2006 as an institution dedicated to displaying the cultural heritage of the village. The permanent exhibition shows the history of fishing from the 16th century to the present day, especially the salted anchovy, an industry which, over the centuries, has been the driving force of the town and has made it famous around the world.

The museum also organises the Salt Festival, an event that takes place on the third Saturday of September each year.

== See also ==
- List of museums in Catalonia
