= Museum of Toys and Automata =

- Museu de Joguets i Autòmats
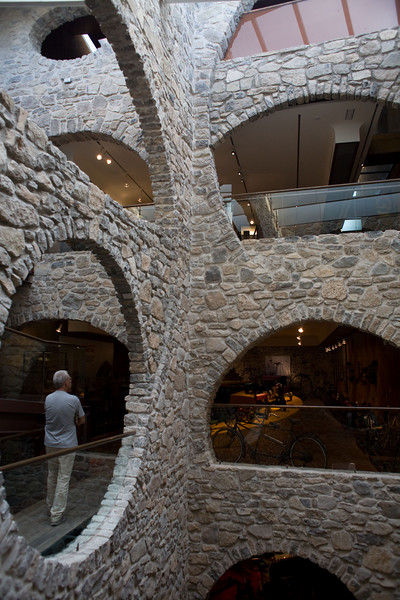
- The museum's interior
- Established: 2004
- Dissolved: 2013
- Location: 23 Plaça Major; 25340, Verdú; Catalonia, Spain
- Coordinates: 41.610275°N 1.142588°E
- Website: http://www.mjoguets.com

The Museum of Toys and Automata (in Catalan language Museu de Joguets i Autòmats) was a museum of toys and automata located in Verdú, in central Catalonia, Spain. It opened in 2004, and in 2013 it closed and the building was converted to an art gallery.

The museum was founded by local man Manel Mayoral, who had built up an extensive collection of antique toys and novelties. It was housed at an old house known as "Cal Jan" in Verdú's main square, over three floors and more than 2000 square meters, half of that in a modern extension.

Cal Jan was built in the 15th century, as were all the other buildings on the same street, and became an important house of Verdú. The lintels of the first floor balconies are an example of early 17th century architecture. In fact, there is an inscription on the façade dating from 1695, which is the year the house was reconstructed. In 1999, the building's conversion to a museum was started, and it was extended and extensively remodelled.
