= Sabadell Art Museum =

Coordinates: 41°32′57.12″N 2°06′33.52″E

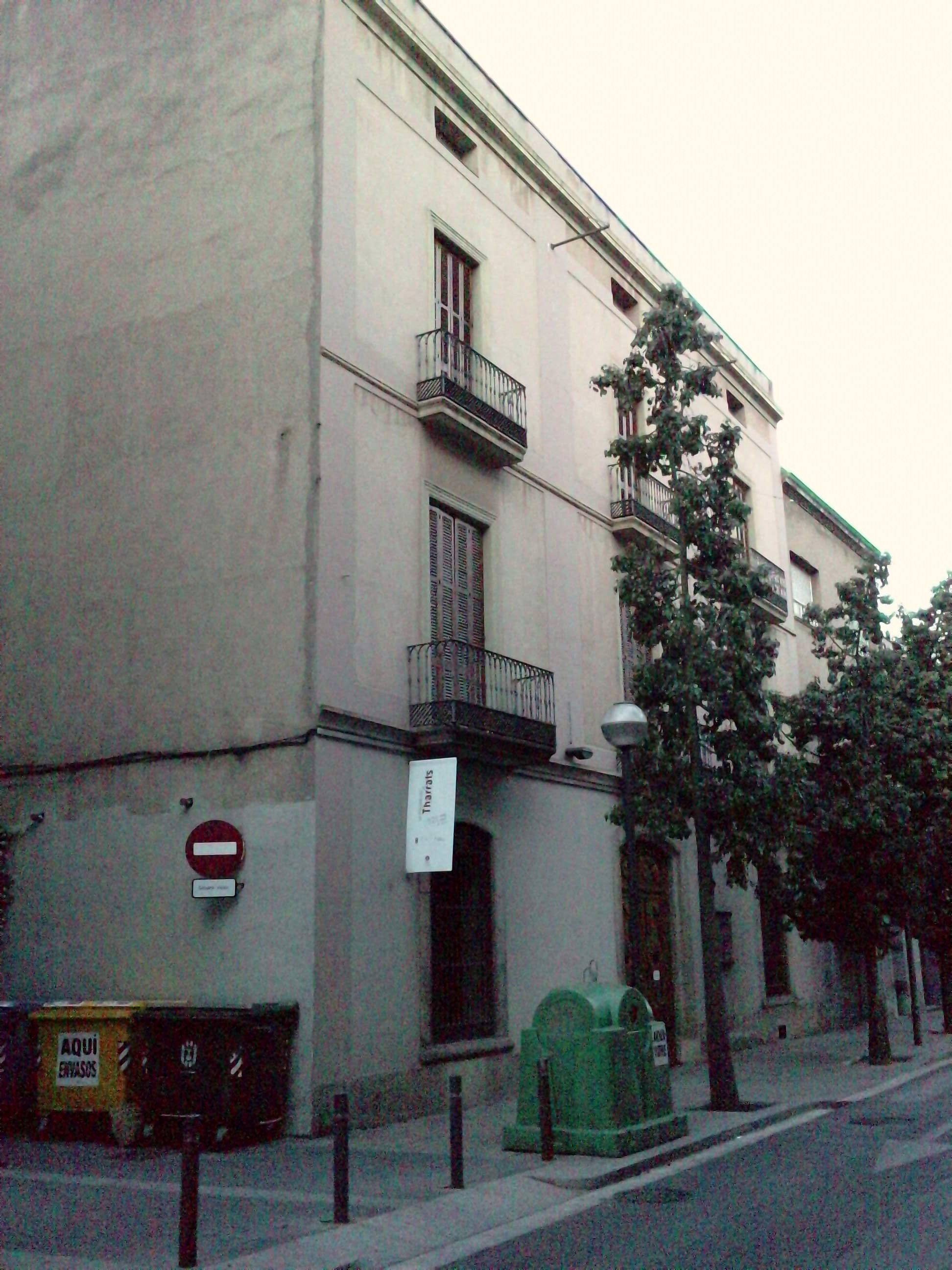
Façade of the Sabadell Art Museum

The Sabadell Art Museum or MAS (Catalan: Museu d'Art de Sabadell) is a museum specialised in Catalan painting from the 19th and 20th centuries and is located in Sabadell, the capital of El Vallès Occidental. It is part of the Barcelona Provincial Council Local Museum Network.

== The building ==
The museum is located in the old residence of Pere Turull i Sallent, a well-known industrialist from the textile era of the city and co-founder of the Caixa d'Estalvis de Sabadell savings bank. The building was constructed between 1812 and 1819 and was purchased by the Sabadell Town Council in 1964. It underwent remodelling between 1993 and 1997.

== Collection ==
Among the Museum's different collections are works from artists connected with the city, such as Marian Burgués, Rafael Durancamps, Josep Espinalt, Joan Figueras, Ramon Quer, Antoni Vila Arrufat, Antoni Estruch, Joan Vila Puig, Joan Vila Cinca and Joan Vilatobà.

== See also ==
- Sabadell History Museum
