= Railway Museum of Catalonia =

Railway museum in Barcelona

- Museu del Ferrocarril de Catalunya; Museo del Ferrocarril de Cataluña
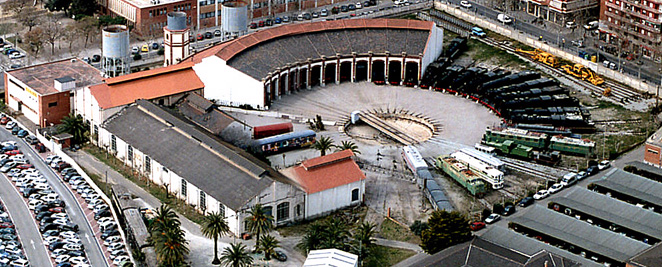
- The Vilanova i la Geltrú Railway Museum, with its roundhouse bays and turntable, as seen from above.
- Established: 5 August 1990
- Location: Vilanova i la Geltrú
- Coordinates: 41°13′13″N 1°43′50″E
- Website: www.museudelferrocarril.org/index_en.asp

The Railway Museum of Catalonia (Catalan: Museu del Ferrocarril de Catalunya; Spanish: Museo del Ferrocarril de Cataluña) is a museum in Vilanova i la Geltrú (Catalonia, Spain). The museum has a large collection of historic railway locomotives and other rolling stock in a former station and roundhouse. It is located close to the railway station in Vilanova i la Geltrú, 40 km south of Barcelona.

== History ==
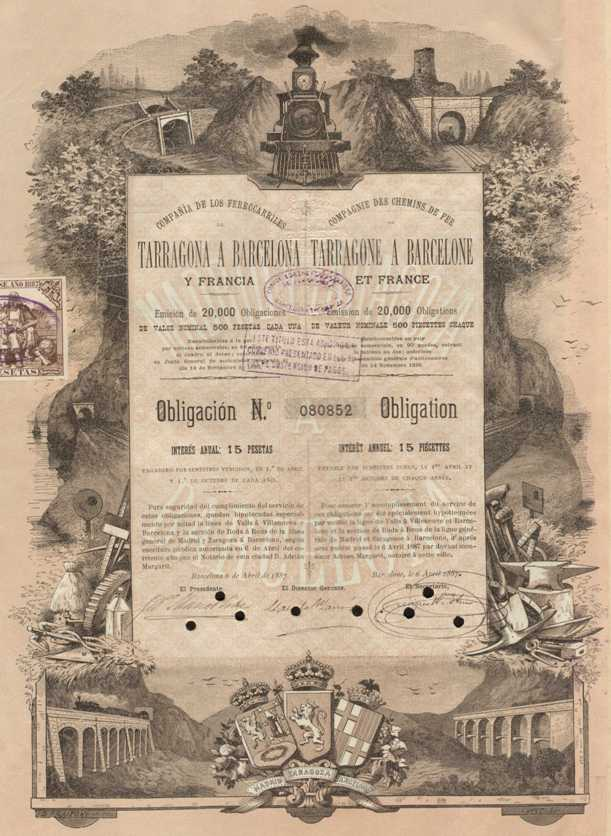
Original bond for the company "Companyia del Ferrocarrils de Tarragona Barcelona i França", similar to the one kept in the Museum

The museum opened in 1990 and is located in a former engine shed, built at the end of the 19th century. About 900 workers repaired and maintained locomotives there until 1967, when these activities ceased.

The main building, attached to the museum, contains a library and a collection of railway items such as caps, miniatures, and machinery. The museum also has an auditorium where a film about the history of the railway in Catalonia is shown daily. The reception where visitors enter is the original ticket office from a railway station in the village of La Granada.

In 1972, MOROP, an association that federates national associations of railroad and model railroad enthusiasts, held their nineteenth congress in Barcelona. The antique locomotives displayed at the congress were stored in the facilities that would later house the museum. In 1981, the centenary of the commercial rail line between Barcelona and Vilanova, the creation of a Railway Museum in the old engine shed was proposed. Renfe and the autonomous government of Catalonia initially led the project. Later the town council of Vilanova joined.

The museum opened on August 5, 1990. In 1993 Renfe made the Vilanova museum a subsidiary of the main museum in Madrid, the Museo del Ferrocarril de Madrid, and the Fundación de los Ferrocarriles Españoles In 2010 the Universitat Politècnica de Catalunya established a master's program on Railway systems and Electrical Traction in the museum's facilities in Vilanova.

The museum's collection comprises more than sixty vehicles from all periods of history, diverse countries of origin and different technologies, including 28 steam locomotives from the late 19th century and a copy of the first steam locomotive used in the Iberian Peninsula, still used in demonstrations on the first Sunday of the month. The collection also includes diesel and electric locomotives, coaches, a Bogie type Harlan, a signal bridge, and an original interlocking lever frame table used in the Barcelona central railway station.

The museum's library contains more than 6,100 volumes in its catalog, including works on trains and vehicles, rail traffic documentation, history and legislation, statistics, and infrastructure. The library also houses 400 video recordings and 10,000 photographs.

== Locomotives ==
| Ref | Year | Object | Nickname | Manufacturer | Description | Image |
|---|---|---|---|---|---|---|
| — | 1948 | Replica 2-2-2 locomotive | Mataró | Maquinista Terrestre y Marítima | Replica of First locomotive in the Iberian Peninsula to serve the first line (Barcelona-Mataró). | |
| Madrid, Zaragoza y Alicante 168 | 1854 | Steam locomotive 120/2112 | Martorell | Sharp, Stewart & Co. Manchester | Oldest original locomotive in Spain. Shown in the 1929 Barcelona International Exposition. | |
| MZA 246 | 1857 | Steam locomotive 030/2013 | Mamut | E. B. Wilson and Company | Second oldest original locomotive in Spain, used for general purposes. | |
| Andaluces 4 | 1871 | Steam locomotive 020-04 | Andaluces | SA John Cockerill | Smaller locomotive used in urban areas and for serving factories. | |
| MZA 571 | 1879 | Steam locomotive 040-2019 | Vilanova | Sharp, Stewart & Co. | In Vilanova i la Geltrú since 1949. | |
| Norte 1653 | 1881 | Steam locomotive 030-2110 | Perruca | Andre Koechlin & Cie | Served the North East lines of Spain. | |
| Oeste 9 | 1881 | Steam locomotive 220-2005 | | Richard Hartmann | For Passenger trains. | |
| Oeste 77 | 1884 | Steam locomotive 120-2131 | | Maschinenfabrik Esslingen | For Passenger trains. | |
| Alcantarilla–Lorca 4 | 1884 | Steam locomotive 030-2369 | Bicicleta (bicycle) | Sharp, Stewart & Co. | For passenger trains. | |
| Alcañiz - La Puebla de Híjar, 4 | 1885 | Steam locomotive 020-210 | Teresita/Clot | SA John Cockerill | Manoeuvring locomotive. | |
| Mollet - Caldes, 6 | 1887 | Steam locomotive 030-0233 | Caldes | Maquinaria Terrestre y Marítima | Initially used for passenger trains, then for manoeuvring. | |
| Andaluces, 6 | | Steam locomotive 220-2023 | Bobadilla | Beyer, Peacock and Company | For passenger trains. | |
| MZA 651 | 1901 | Steam locomotive 230-4001 | Compound | Hanomag | Former express locomotive. | Locomotive MZA 651 |
| Ferrocarril Central de Aragón, 1 | 1902 | Steam locomotive 030-2471 | FCA 1 | Marcinelle et Couillet | For Passenger trains. | |
| Ferrocarril Central de Aragón, 53 | 1906 | Steam locomotive 060-4013 | Mallet-Compound | Swiss Locomotive and Machine Works (subcontracted to Esslingen) | Used for hauling heavy materials. | |
| Norte 3101 | 1909 | Steam locomotive 230-2085 | | Hanomag | For Passenger trains. | |
| MZA 1155 | 1913 | Steam locomotive 240-2135 | Mastodonte | Henschel & Sohn | General-purpose locomotive. | |
| Ferrocarril Central de Aragón, 74 | 1927 | Steam locomotive 240-2074 | Mastodonte | Tubize | General-purpose locomotive. 115 km/h maximum speed. | |
| FCA 101 | | Steam locomotive 462F-0401 | Beyer-Garratt | Euskalduna, Bilbao | Temporarily transferred to a depot near the town of Lleida. | |
| MZA 1808 | 1939 | Steam locomotive 241F-2108 | Linda Tapada | Maquinista Terrestre y Marítima (Barcelona) | General purpose locomotive. | |
| RENFE 151.5001 | 1942 | Steam locomotive 151F-3101 | Santa Fe | Maquinista Terrestre y Marítima | Heavy and powerful locomotive. | |
| Renfe | | Steam locomotive Renfe; 240F-2591 | | Euskalduna (Bilbao) | | 240F-2591 |
| Renfe | 1953 | Locomotores de Vapor 141F-2101/2348 | Mikado | North British Locomotive Company | A Mikado locomotive in this museum was the last steam locomotive in service in Spain. | |
| Norte & Renfe 7001 | 1928 | Electric locomotive 270-001 | Chata | | Electric locomotive. | |
| Norte & Renfe 7206 | 1928 | Electric locomotive 272-006 | Crocodile | | Electric locomotive. | |
| Estado i Renfe 1004 | 1929 | Electric locomotive 280-004 | | CAF SECHERON (Gipuzkoa) | Used on narrow-gauge lines in the Pyrenees. | |
| Renfe 7807 | 1954 | Electric locomotive 278-007 | Panchorga | USA | Electric locomotive initially in passenger service, then as a freight locomotive. | |
| Renfe 7652 | | Electric locomotive Alstom; 276-052 | | | For express train haulage. | |
| Norte & Renfe 9165 | 1935 | Automotor; 590-165 | | EUA | Light autonomous for short distances. | |
| Ou (Catalan for "Egg") | 1940 | Dresina de via i obres | | | Transport for service personnel (12 seats). | |
| 3T | 1950 | Locomotive; 350-003 | Talgo II | Talgo trains | For Hauling Talgo expresses. | Talgo 350 003 |
| 1801 | 1958 | Diesel locomotive 318-001 | Marilyn | American Locomotive Company (ALCO) | Servicing Galicia (North-West) lines. | |
| Talgo | 1983 | Diesel locomotive Talgo; 354-001 | Virgen de Covadonga | Krauss Maffei (Alemanya) | For haulage of Talgo expresses. | |
| 2005 T | 1964 | Cabin of the Talgo III locomotive | Virgen del Carmen | | For hauling Talgo Expresses. | |
| RENFE 281 (previously 1000) | 1927 | Electric locomotive | Ripoll | CAF | This locomotive was built to serve the Ripoll-Puigcerdà line. | ND |

== Image Gallery ==
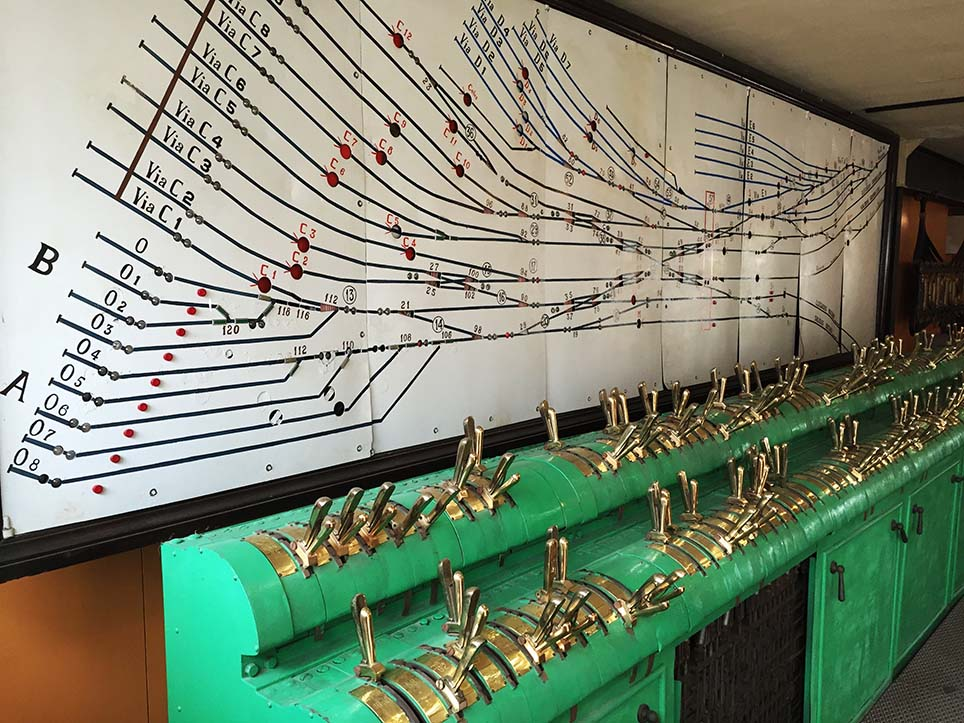
Original interlocking frame from "Estació de França", 1929, Barcelona

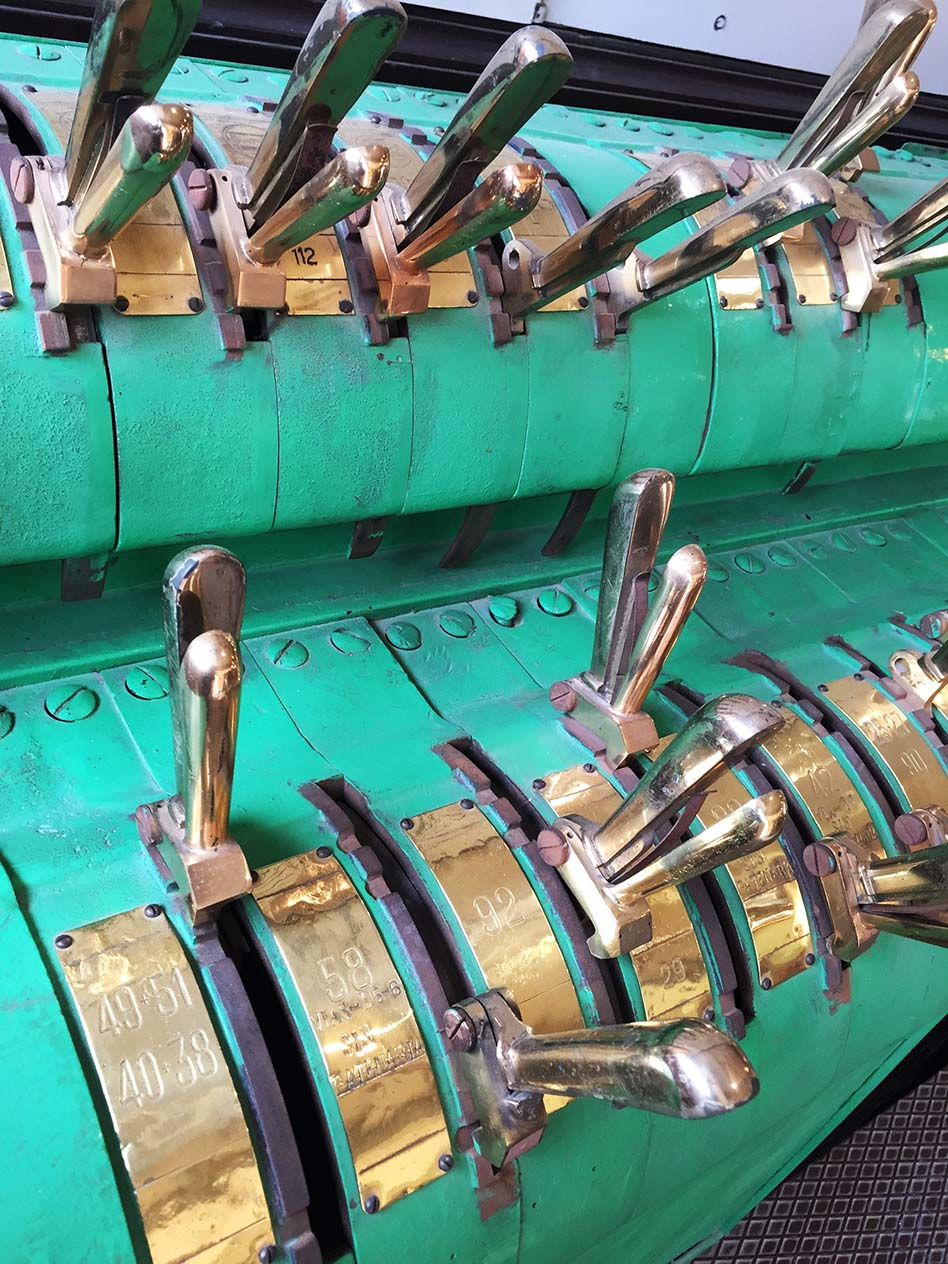
Levers in the interlocking frame

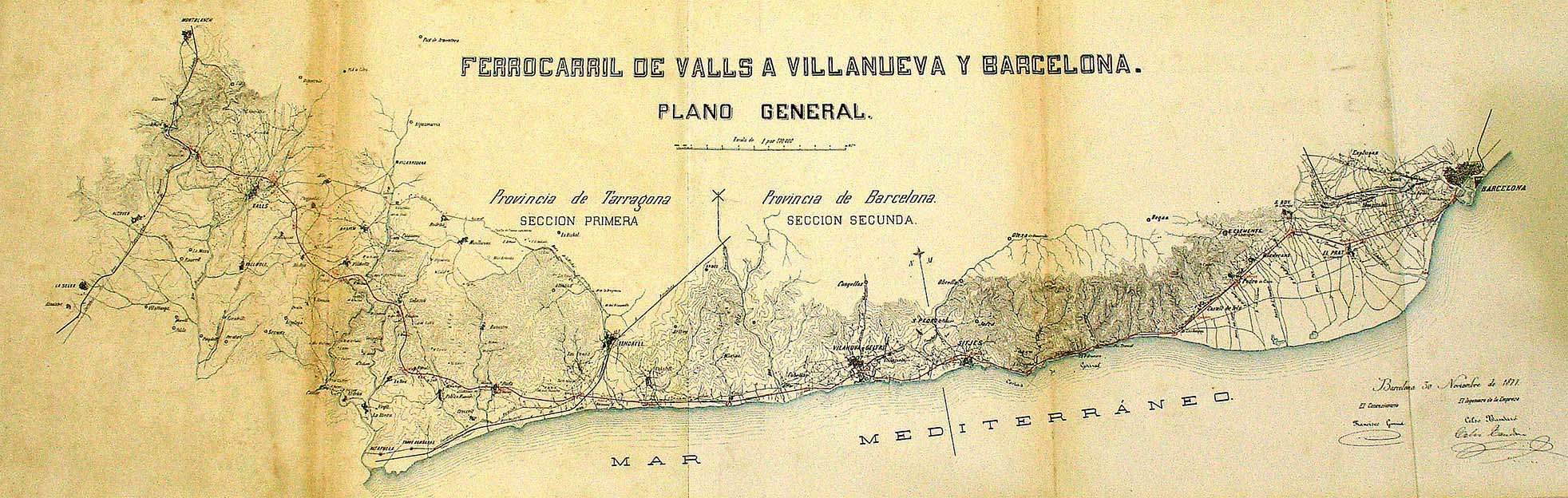
Map of line Valls-Vilanova-Barcelona

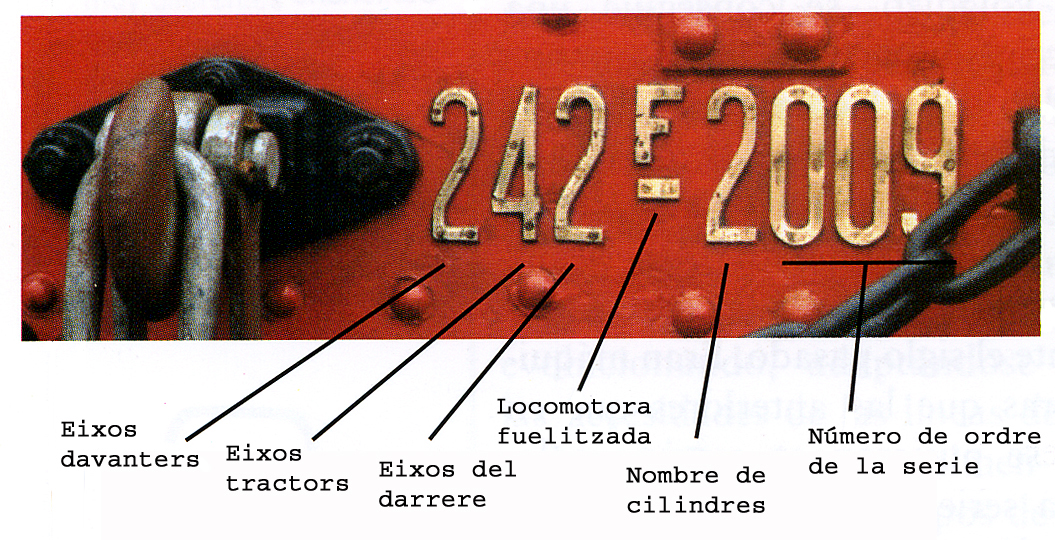
Identification codes used by RENFE in locomotives

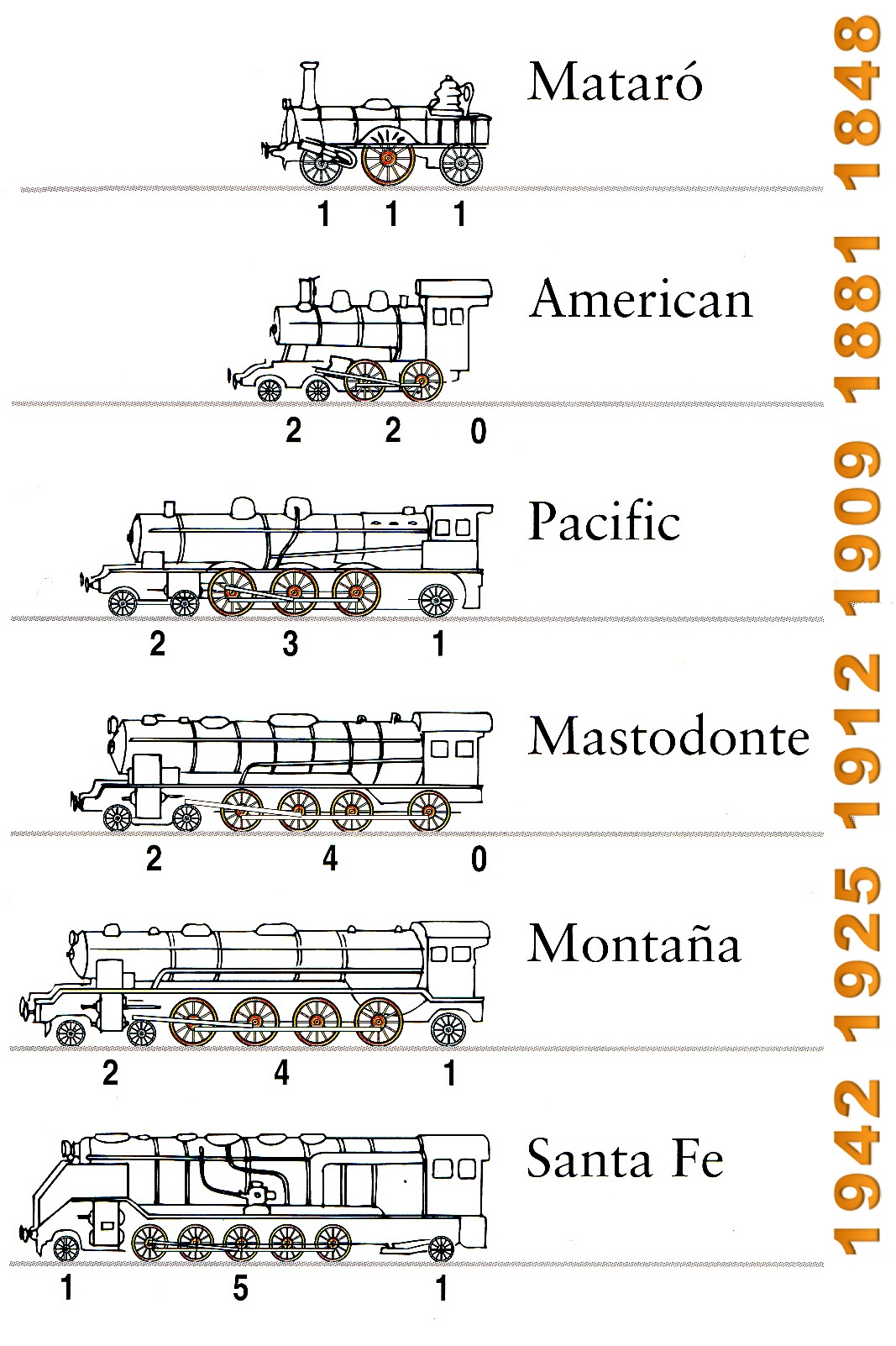
Numbering codes for wheels arrangements

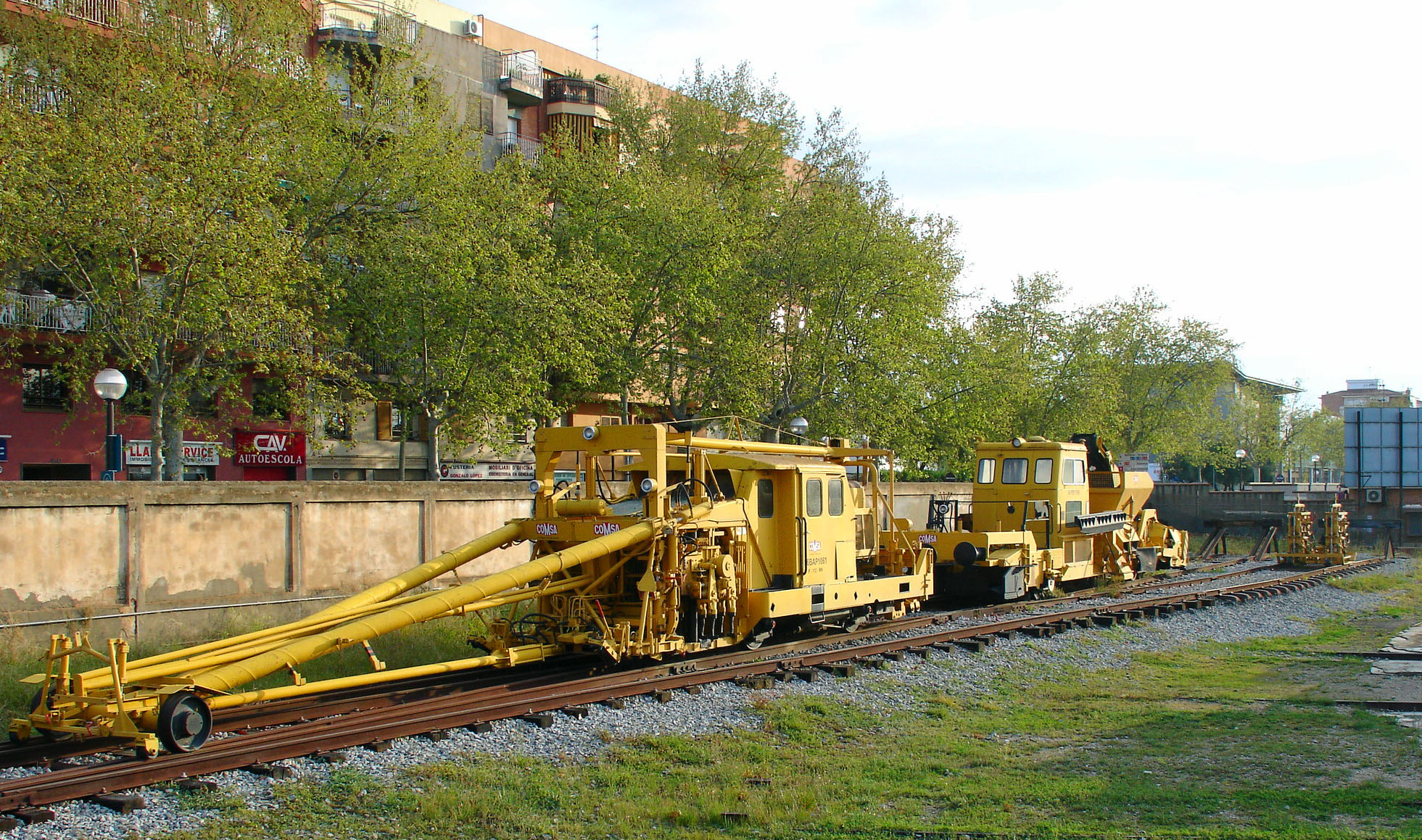
Vehicles for rail maintenance

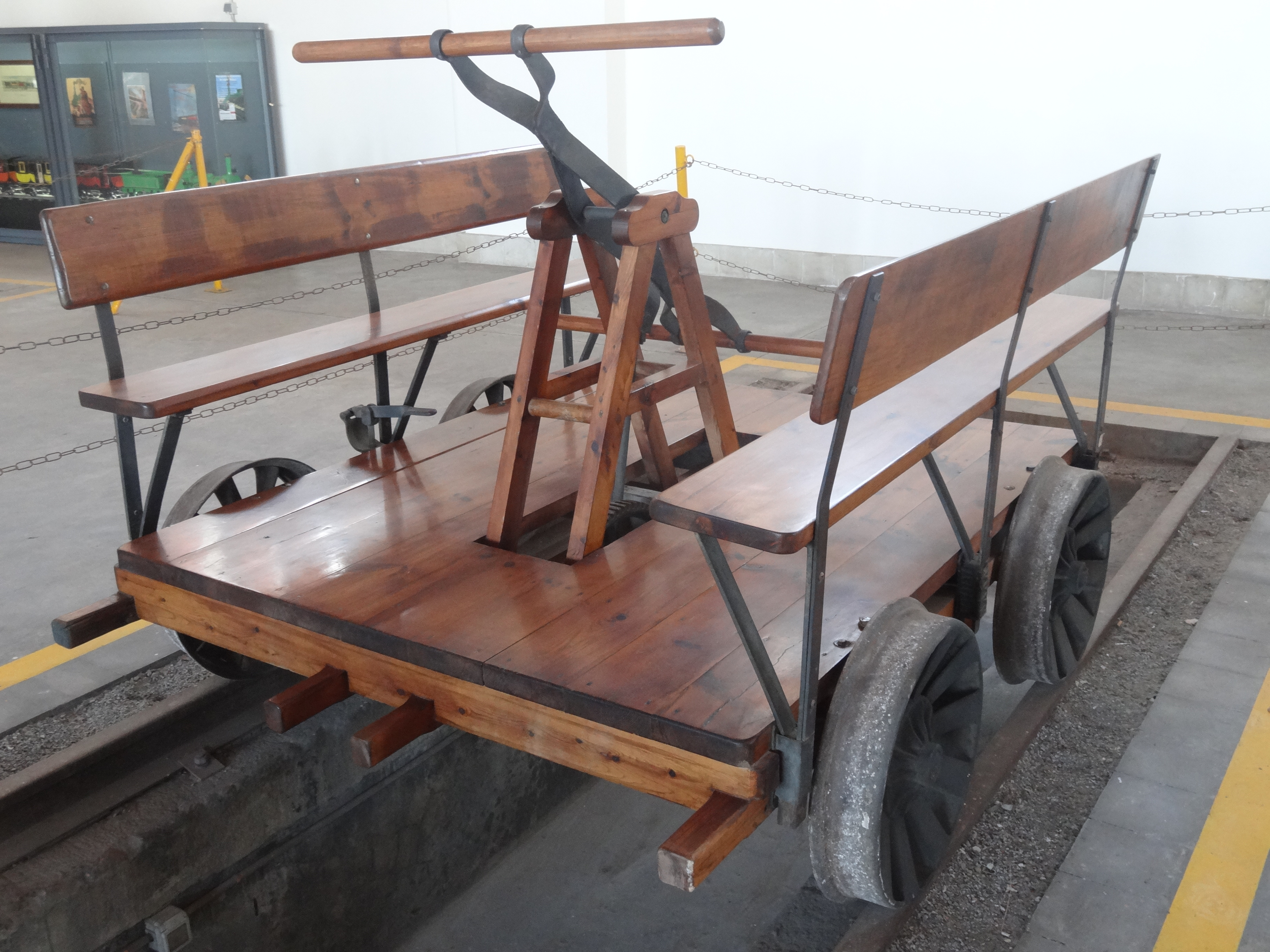
Manual service operation coach (350 kg weight)

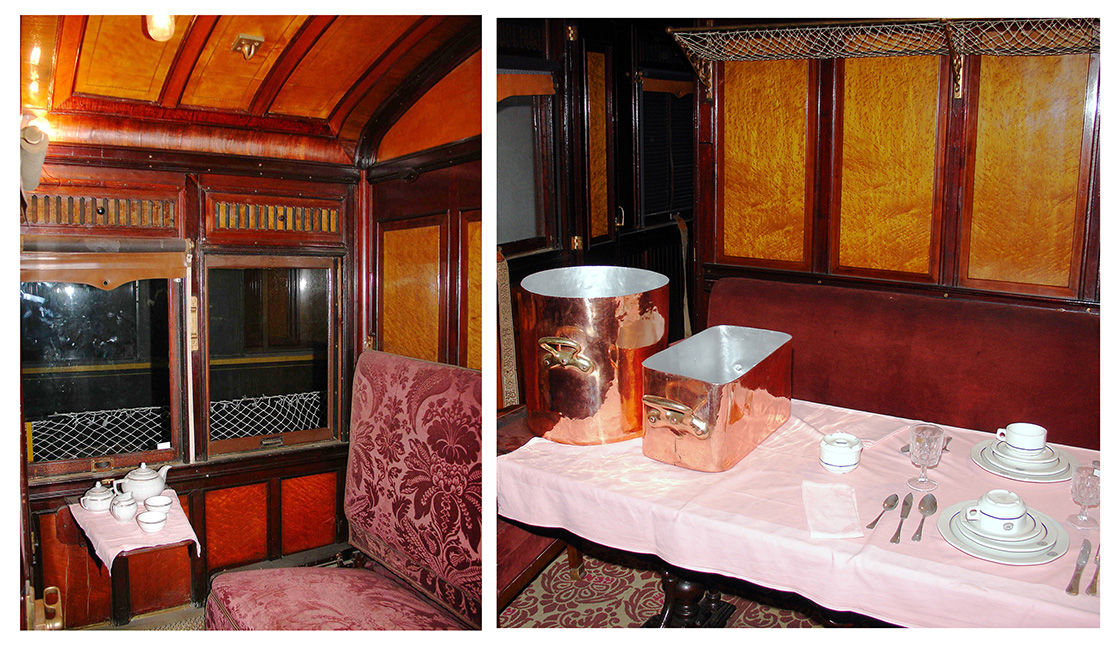
First class coach

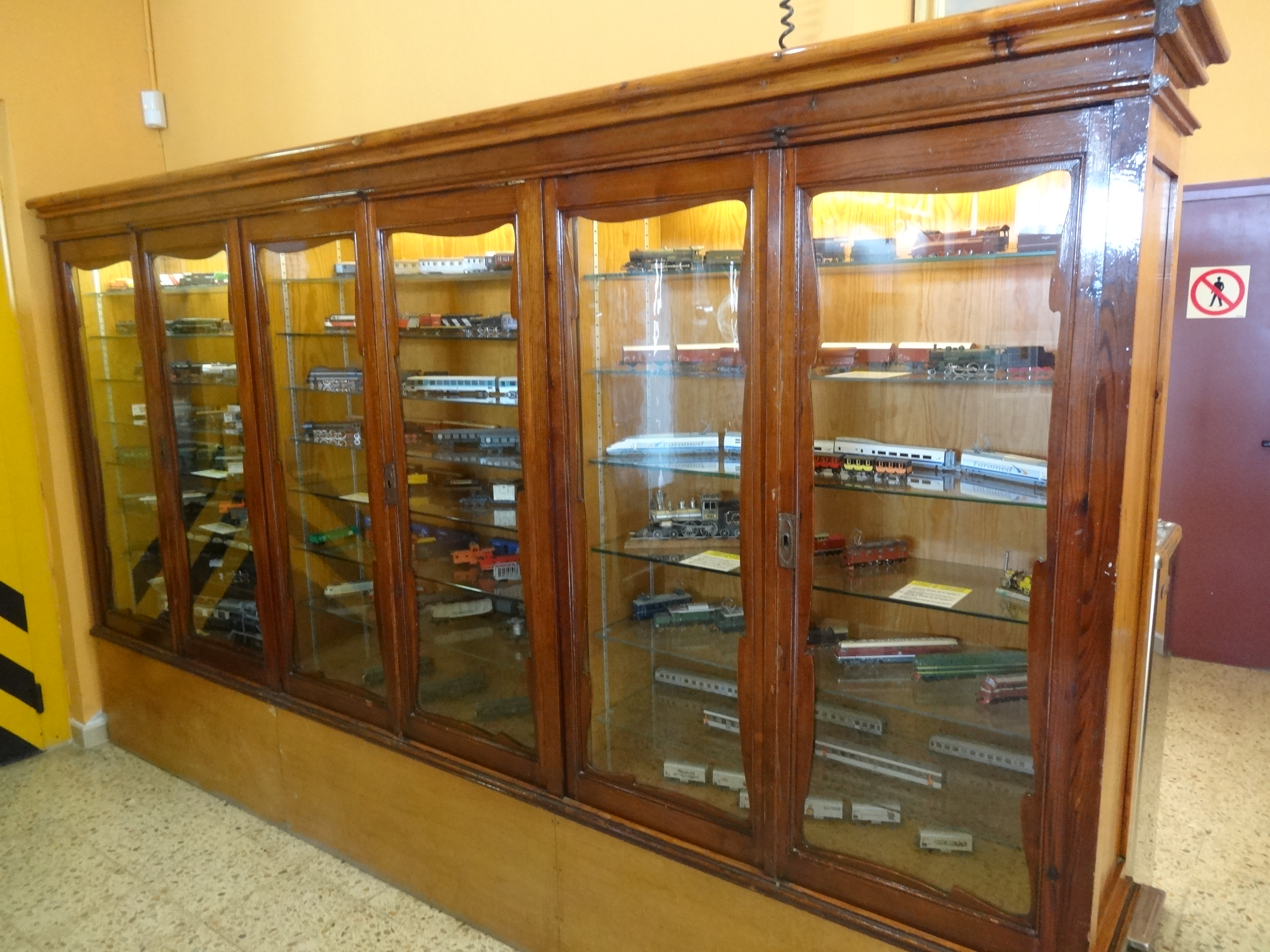
Miniatures

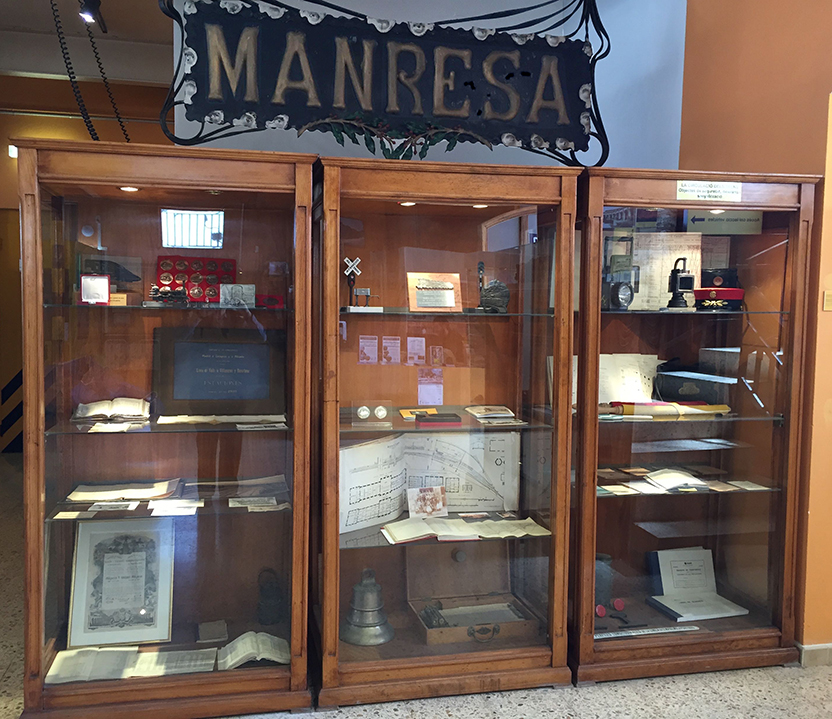
Display cabinet old items

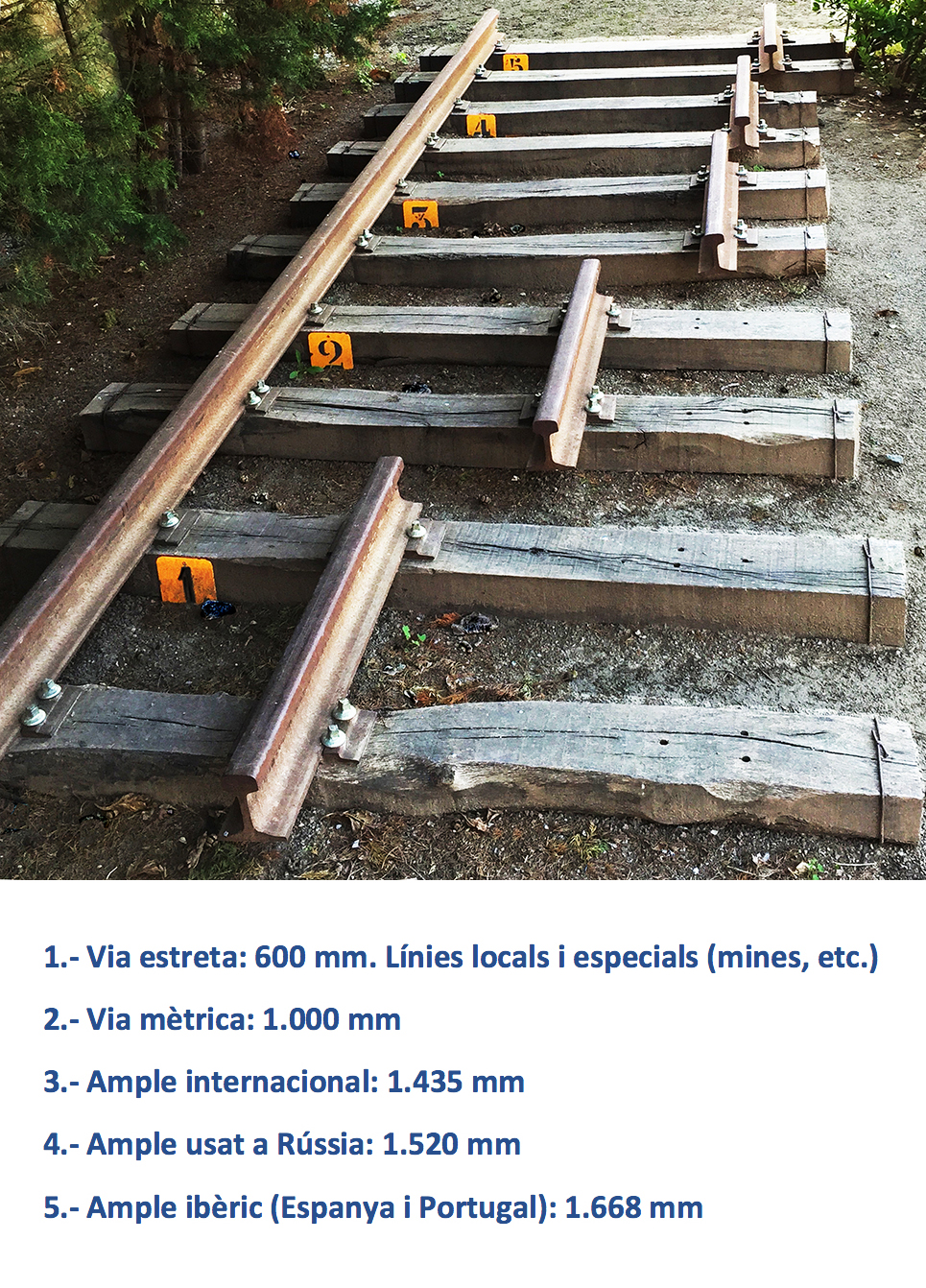
Rail gauges

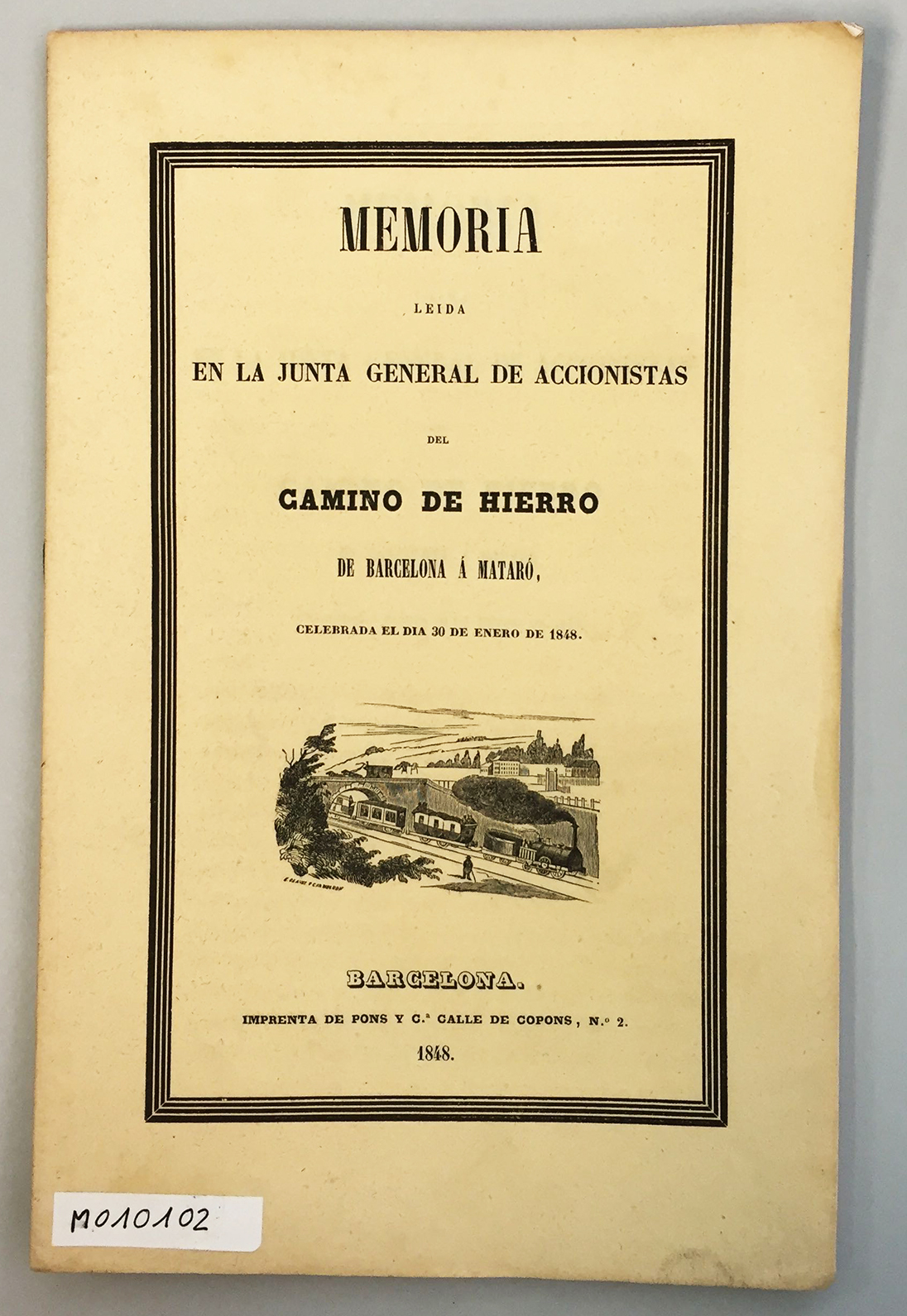
1848 Annual Report "Camino de Hierro de Barcelona a Mataró"

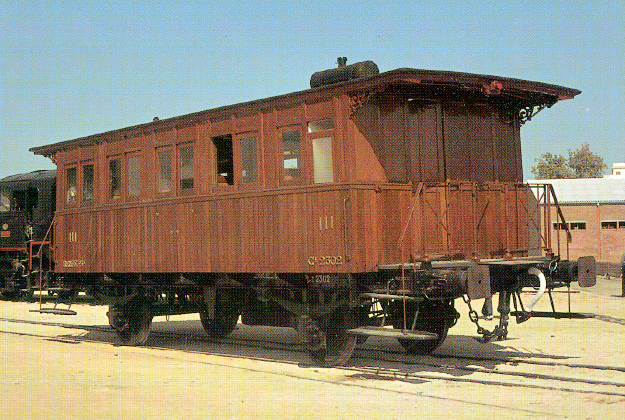
3rd class passenger wooden coach rebuilt in 1991 in Vilanova i la Geltrú

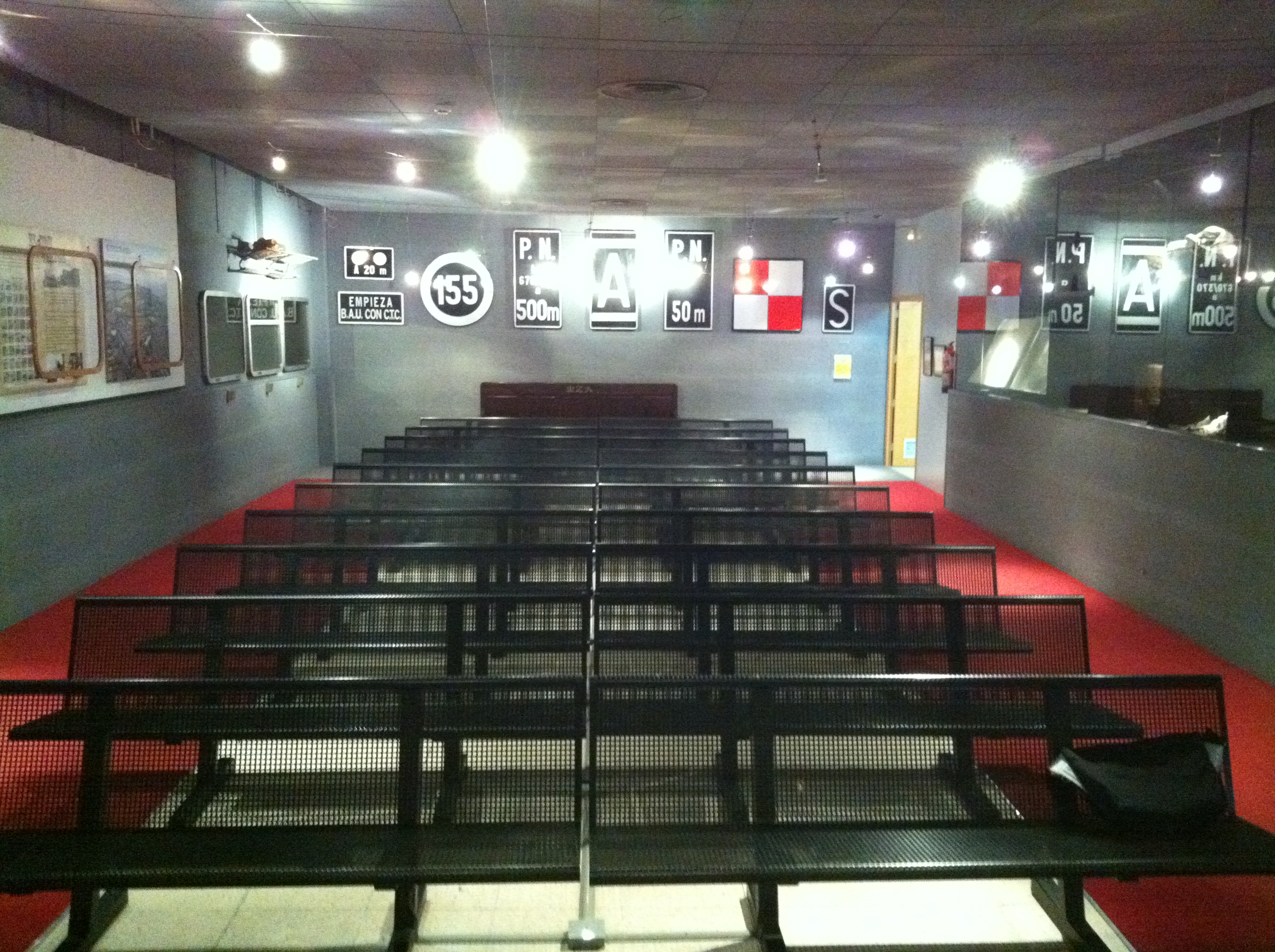
Auditorium

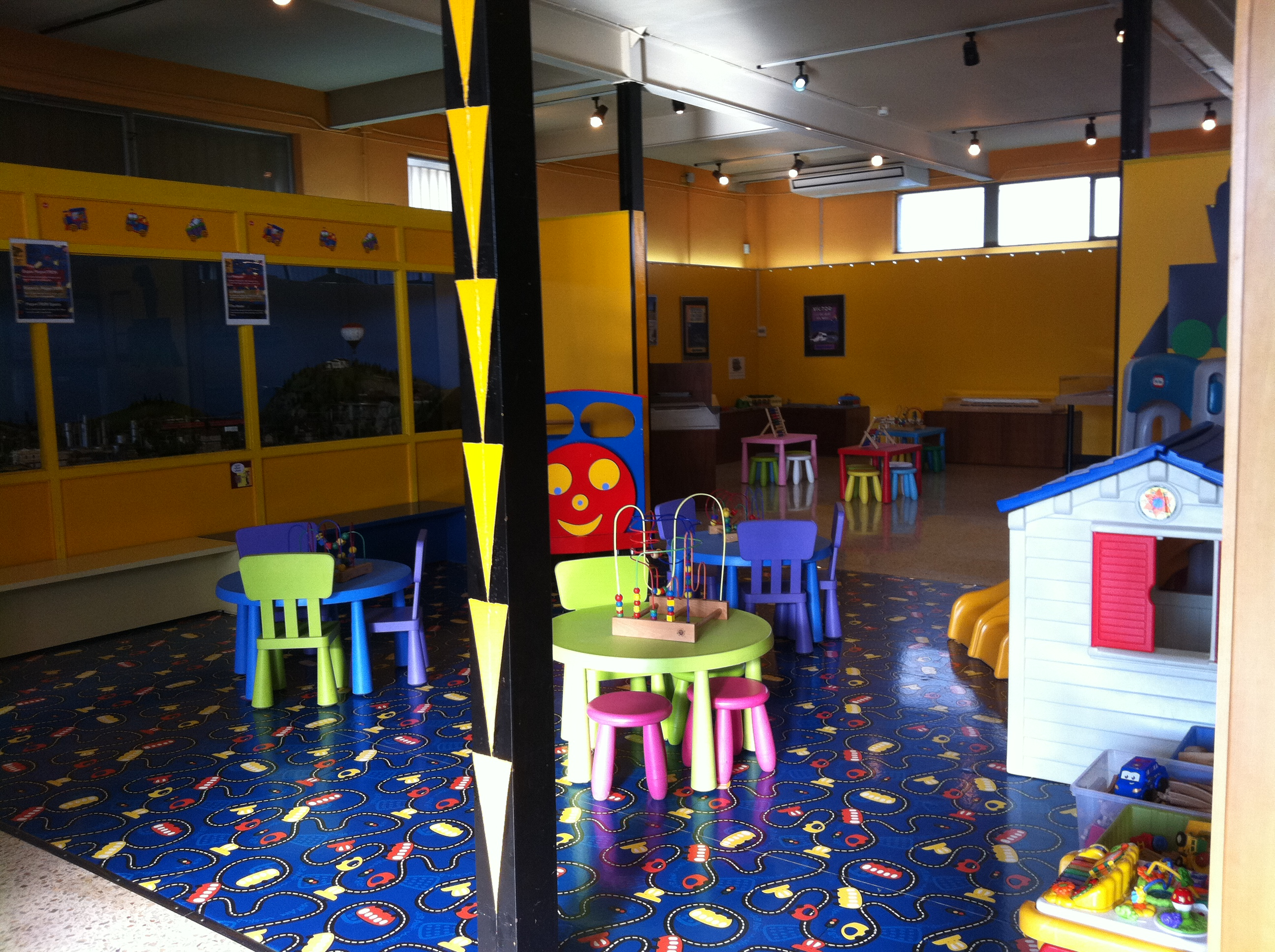
Baby-sitting area

== See also ==
- List of museums in Catalonia
