= Granollers Museum =

Coordinates: 41°36′25.75″N 2°17′19.05″E

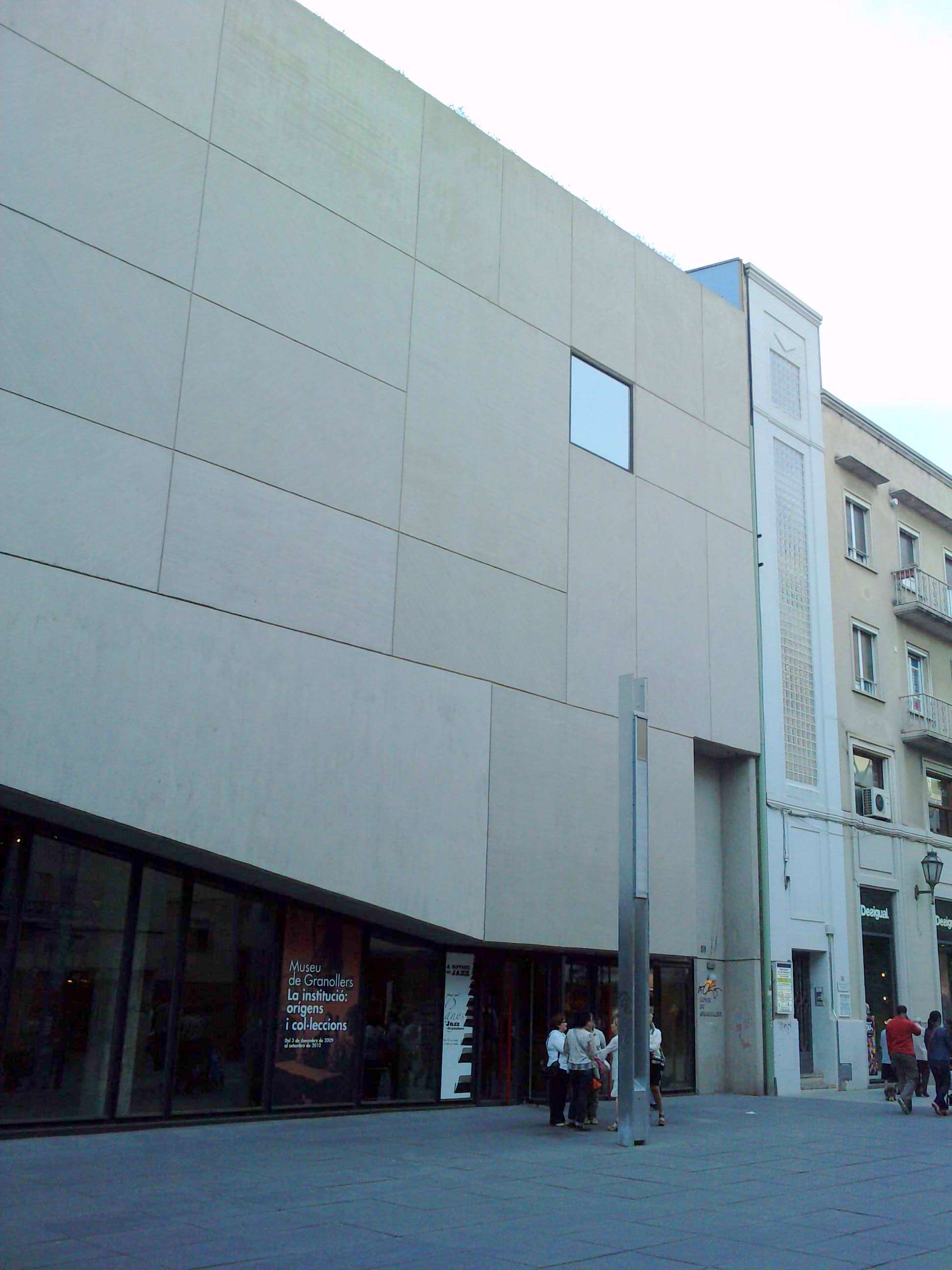
Front of the Granollers Museum

The Granollers Museum (Granollers, Vallès Oriental) is a heterogeneous collection comprising archaeology, decorative arts, ethnography, numismatics and ancient, modern and contemporary art. The Museum, which is part of the Barcelona Provincial Council Local Museum Network, coordinates and supports a major part of the archaeological excavations taking place in the region of El Vallès Oriental, while promoting awareness and protection of local cultural heritage. In addition, the Museum manages L'Adoberia, the medieval Granollers historic interpretation centre.

The Museum’s collection is on display by rote, to give a more dynamic feel to the collections, which are shown in three different exhibitions each year, and is accompanied by temporary exhibitions and other activities, such as workshops, conferences and concerts.

== See also ==
- Granollers Museum of Natural Sciences
