= Arranz-Bravo Foundation =

Coordinates: 41°21′59.98″N 2°6′53.04″E

The Arranz-Bravo Foundation is an area dedicated to contemporary art in L’Hospitalet de Llobregat, the aim of which is twofold: to disseminate the art of painter Eduardo Arranz-Bravo (Barcelona, 1941) and promote contemporary creation among youth. While it awaits the opening of its final location, the old L'Hospitalet mill, the Foundation is provisionally located in the old warehouses of the Tecla Sala textile factory, a project designed by architect Jordi Garcés. The Foundation is part of the Barcelona Provincial Council Local Museum Network.

== See also ==
- L'Hospitalet Museum
