= Flour Mill and Eco-Museum, Castelló d'Empúries =

Coordinates: 42°15′32″N 3°04′37″E

Castelló d'Empúries Flour Mill and Eco-Museum
- Ecomuseu-Farinera de Castelló d'Empúries
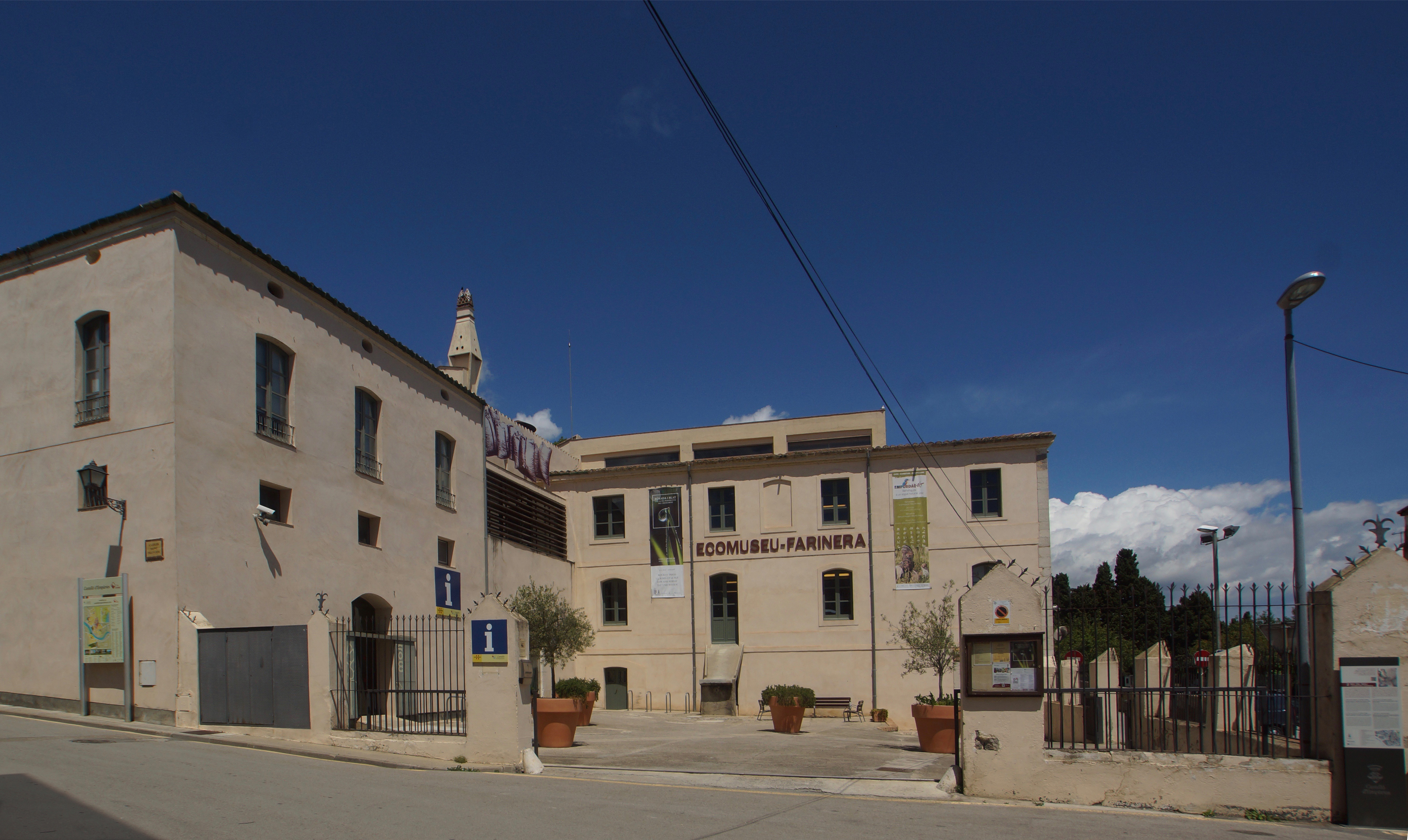
- Established: 2004
- Location: Castelló d'Empúries (Catalonia)
- Type: Ecomuseum
- Director: Carme Gilabert i Valldepérez
- Website: www.ecomuseu-farinera.org/en

'The Castelló d'Empúries Flour Mill and Eco-Museum' is a factory that was open from the late 19th century and during the first half of the 20th century, built on the remains of three medieval flour mills. The museum opened to the public in 1998, following a renovation carried out by the municipality. It was converted into an ecomuseum with displays covering the flour industry in Catalonia and the great changes that took place in flour production during the second half of the 19th century. It is part of the network of Science and Technology Museums of Catalonia.
