= Biblioteca Museu Víctor Balaguer =

Library and museum in Catalonia, Spain

Coordinates: 41°13′28″N 1°43′33″E

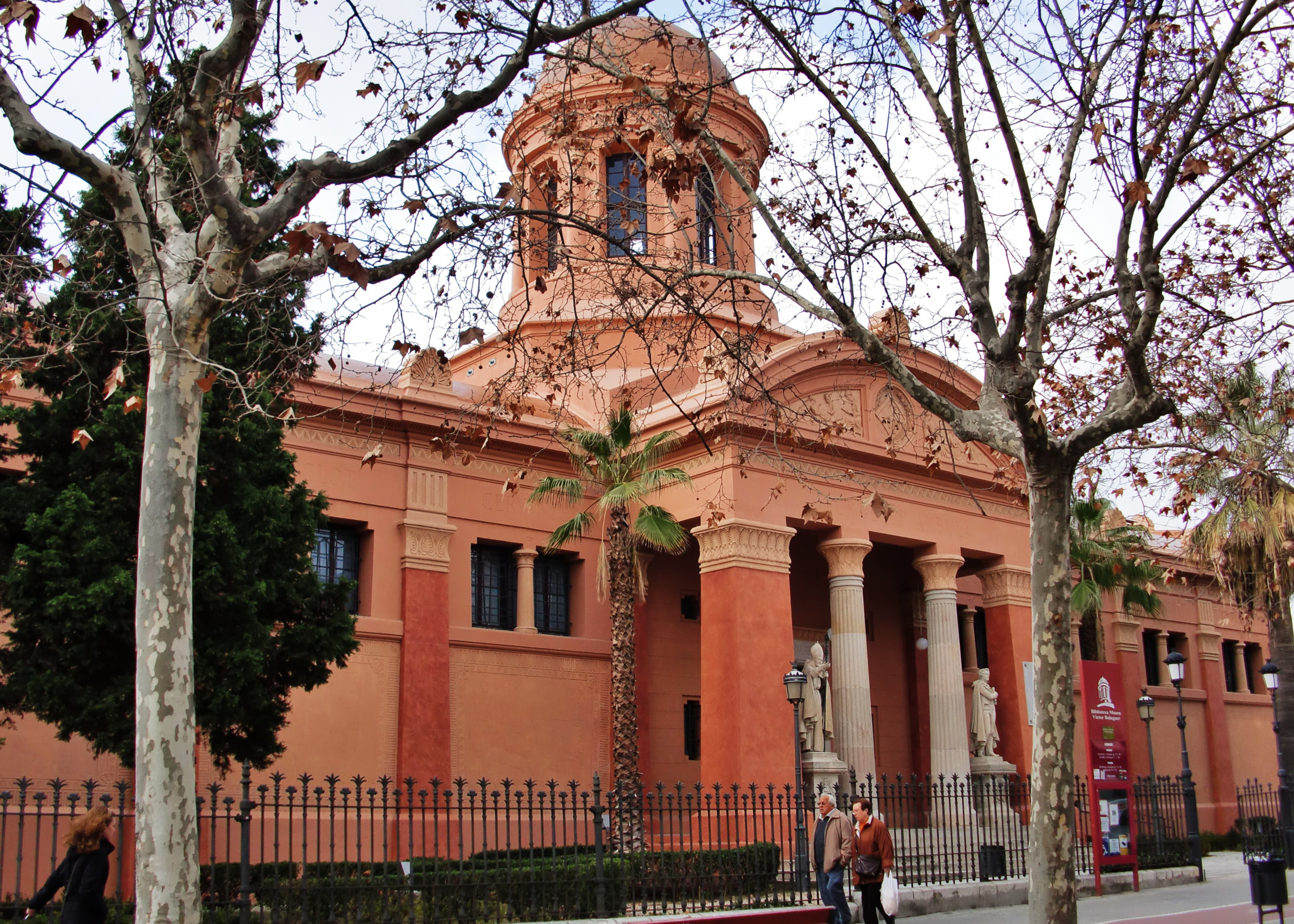
- Víctor Balaguer Museum & Library building and grounds
- Established: 1884
- Location: Vilanova i la Geltrú
- Director: Mireia Rosich
- Public transit access: Vilanova i la Geltrú Railway Station
- Website: www.victorbalaguer.cat/en

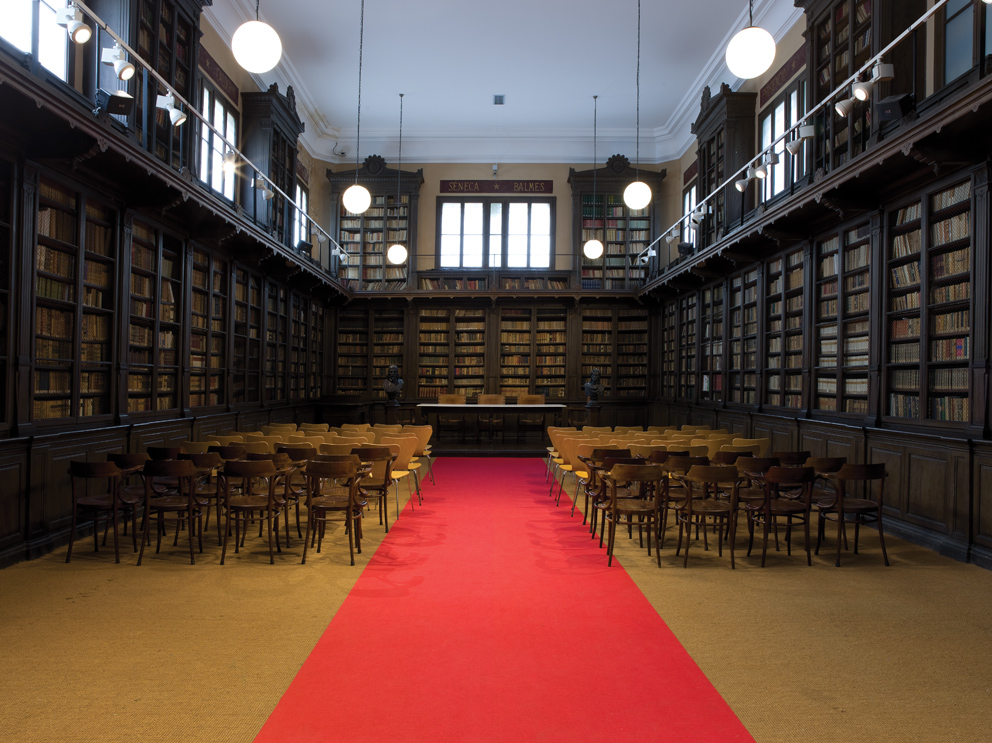
The museum library

The Biblioteca Museu Víctor Balaguer (Víctor Balaguer Museum & Library) is located in Vilanova i la Geltrú, province of Barcelona, Catalonia, Spain and was founded in 1884 by Víctor Balaguer to thank the city for its support during his political career. Since 2000 the museum is part of the National Art Museum of Catalonia and the library is part of the National Library of Catalonia.

== Building ==
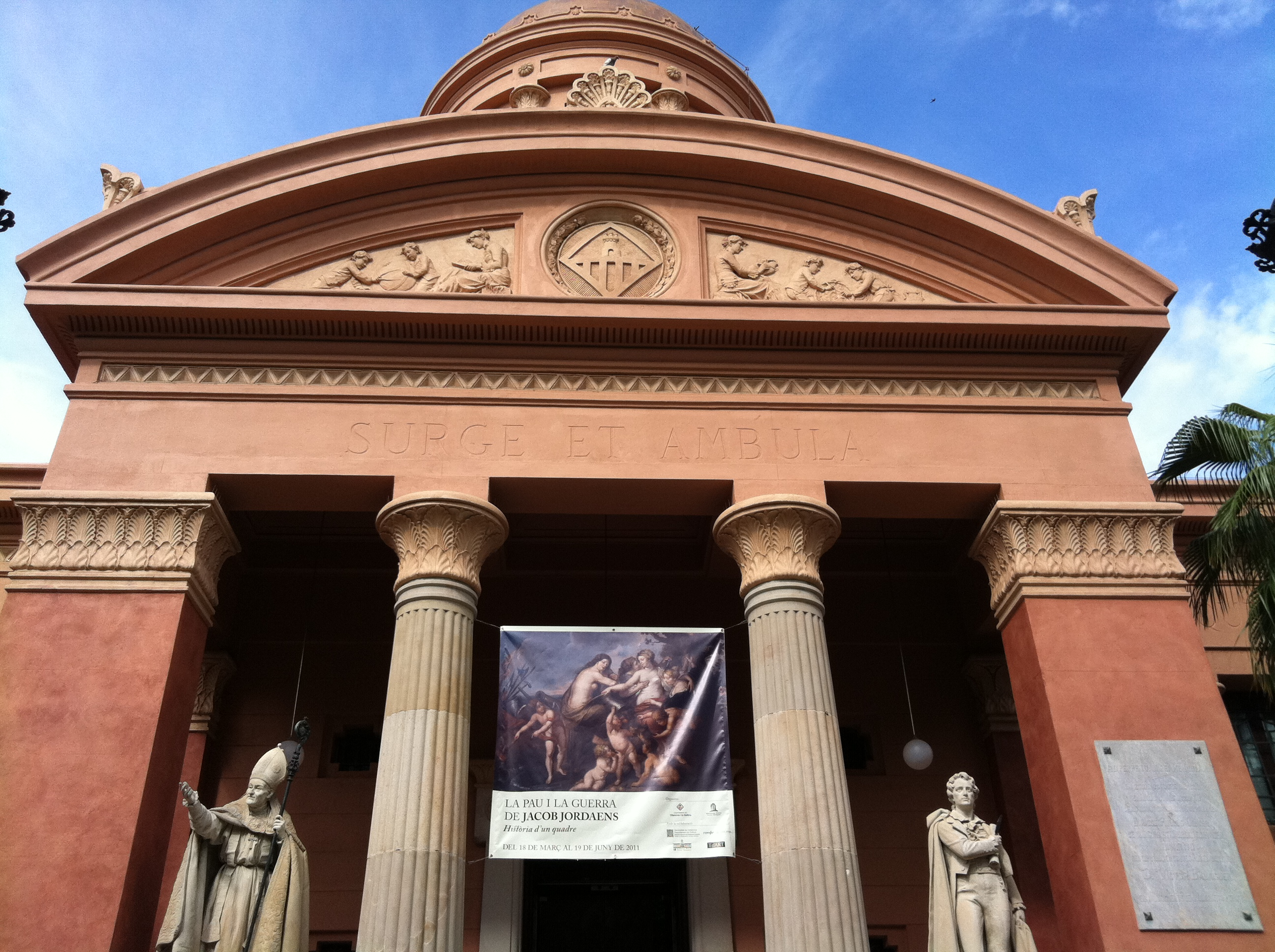
Entrance to the main building with stairs flanked by the sculptures of Francesc Armanyà and the poet Manuel de Cabanyes, and the inscription Surge et Ambula.

The building was built between 1882 and 1884, it is from the architect Jeroni Granell i Mundet and it is located in the centre of Vilanova i la Geltrú, surrounded by the railway station, the superior engineering technical college of Vilanova i la Geltrú of the Polytechnic University of Catalonia and the library of this college. It was specifically conceived as a library and museum, which was unusual at that time. The building is temple-shaped, and it has neo-Egyptian and neo-Greek ornamental elements, distinctive details of public architecture in Catalonia at the end of the 19th century, just before the Modernisme arrived.

On the facade of the building we can find the sculptures of the archbishop Francesc Armanyà and the poet Manuel de Cabanyes, who were relevant figures of Vilanova at the 19th century. On top of the main entrance it can be read the headword Surge et Ambula (stand up and walk in Latin).

It is also relevant the 19th century garden that surrounds the building. Here we can find the so-called Santa Teresa House, the place where Víctor Balaguer lived during his stays in Vilanova.

Over the years the building has undergone several alterations and changes, but in the last one they choose recovering the original style designed by Granell and therefore recovering the natural light inside the halls.

== Library ==
It was conceived to make known, through objects and documents of all kinds, the entirety of the knowledge. His founder contributed books, magazines and other documents. The founder's intention was to open it to any citizen "without any kind of economic or social exclusion" it was the precedent of Catalan public libraries.

The collection's classification and layout are the result of research by the librarian and printer Joan Oliva i Milà, who studied other European libraries so as to see which the best organization for the new centre was. In that moment, it stressed a big table where the readers had at his disposal journals and magazines from different places that allowed them always being informed.

Nowadays, there are 50.000 books and almost 2.000 daily publications from between 18th and 19th century. Moreover, there also are around 50.000 letters and several literary and political manuscripts from Víctor Balaguer. All of this turns it into one of the richest bibliographic collections of the 19th century in Catalonia.

It also has documents, personal or artistic archives from personalities such as Enric Cristòfor Ricart, Joan Alemany i Moya and Eduard Toldrà, as well as the personal bibliographic found of Joan Rius Vila, José Cruset and the gastronomic figure J.E.Roig Santacana among others.

== Collections ==
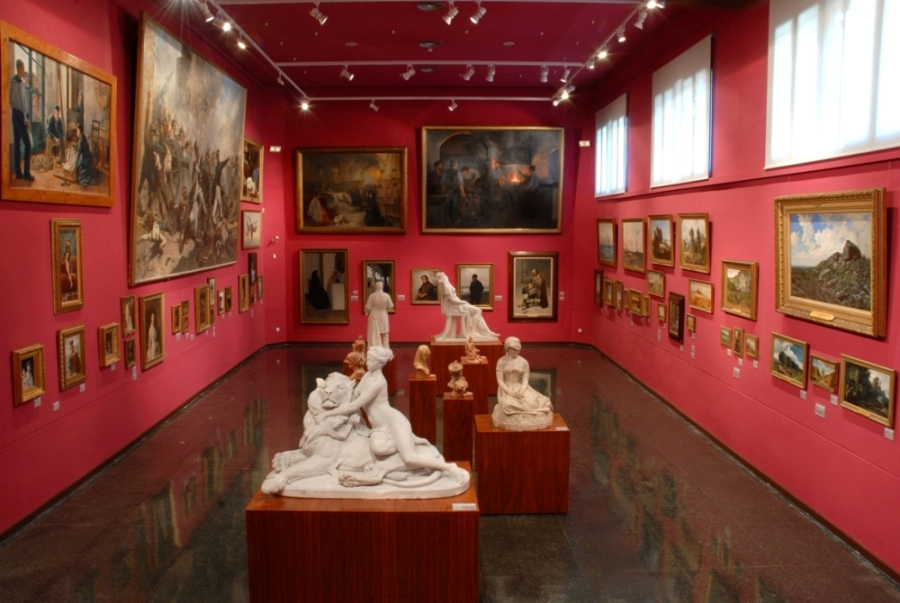
The arts gallery hall

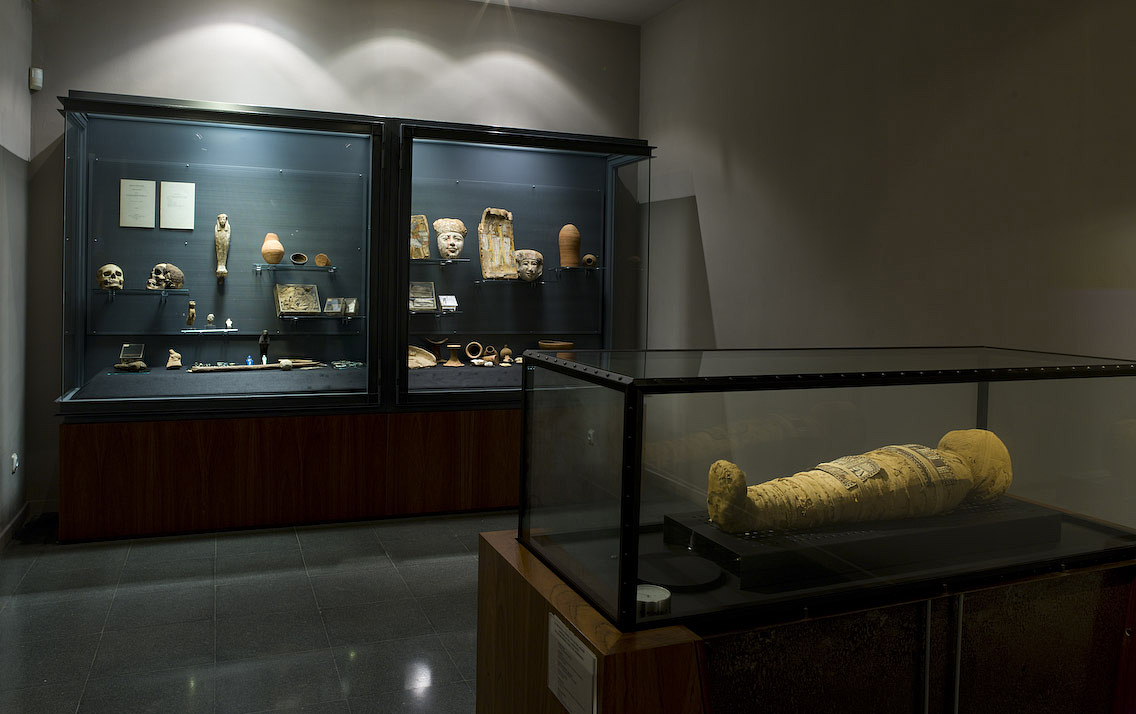
Egyptian hall

As the ancient collectors of the 19th century, the collection is divided into several subcollections because of Balaguer's multidisciplinary interest. Although the majority of the collection was given by Balaguer, the museum has incorporated and enriched his collections through the years with several donations and acquisitions. As of 2023, the museum's artistic holdings consist of 10,500 different objects, with an emphasis on painting and sculpture of the 19th century. Since the year of its foundation, the Museo del Prado has deposited several works that are changed periodically. This deposit is often made up of Castilian, Andalusian and Valencian paintings from between the 16th and the 18th century, there are works from well-known artists such as El Greco, Francisco Goya or Jusepe de Ribera among others. The museum also preserves the municipal Catalan painting collection of the 19th century that until 1996 was shown at Castell de la Geltrú.

=== Art gallery ===
==== 19th century painting and sculpture ====
In the arts gallery hall there is one of the best Catalan painting collections of the 19th century, with works from Santiago Rusiñol, Ramon Casas i Carbó, Joaquim Vayreda, Ramon Martí Alsina, Pau Carbonell and Dionisio Baixeras Verdaguer among others. It basically shows the founder's original collection and paintings donated by the own artists. The works are shown in chronological order so as to evoke Roma's school about Catalan art in the 19th century. In the hall there also is the Monteleon's park defense from Joaquín Sorolla, known popularly as the Second of May Prado's property.

==== Baroque painting ====
In the Prado hall there is an important collection of baroque painting coming from the Museo del Prado. There are works such as "The Holy Family" from El Greco and other paintings from Luca Giordano, Bartolomé Esteban Murillo, Peter Paul Rubens, Jusepe de Ribera, etc.

Castilian and Andalusian schools are more represented here than the Flemish and the Italian. The paintings are distributed in four big thematic areas: religious painting, portrait, mythology and nature, including still life.

==== 20th century painting and sculpture ====
At the second floor halls there are paintings and sculptures of the main artists of the first half of the 20th century such as Santiago Rusiñol, Ramon Casas i Carbó, Hermenegildo Anglada Camarasa, Joaquim Mir, Isidre Nonell, Francesc Domingo or Xavier Nogués among others. Most of these paintings are small and they were donated to the Institution in 1956. The year gives the name to the whole collection as Legate of the 56.

Related with the local history there is a hall with paintings of the old Cafè Foment and a little space with works from the Vilanova School.

At this floor there is also a contemporary arts collection from the 1950s and '60s, with paintings from Albert Ràfols Casamada, Hernández Pijuan, Joan-Josep Tharrats, Josep Guinovart i Bertran, Antonio Saura... and sculptures from Àngel Ferrant and Andreu Alfaro among others. The majority of this collection works come from the first Barcelona Museum of Contemporary Art founded in 1963 so as to prevent the dispersion of this important collection, considered as the most complete informalist arts collection in Catalonia.

There is a temporary show hall too.

=== Archaeology and ethnography ===
==== Egyptian collection ====
There is an Egyptian hall where there can be found authentic objects from the Ancient Egypt. It stresses for its singularity the little mummy of a five years old kid called Nesi, one of the five unique mummies that are nowadays preserved in Catalan museums. The museum's Egyptian collection was the first one in Catalonia and was donated in 1886 by Eduard Toda i Güell a diplomatic figure, writer and a close collaborator with Víctor Balaguer in the Renaixença movement. Some of the pieces of the collection come from Sennedjem's tomb in Deir el-Medina (west Thebes) where Eduard Toda collaborated.

==== Pre-Columbian collection ====
The pre-Columbian collection groups objects from the most significant zones of Mesoamerica especially from the Mexican plateau, Central America and South America. Most of the pieces of the collection were donated by diplomatic figures and distinguished personalities who travelled to the zone and sometimes took part of archaeological excavations. One of the people who contributed to enlarge the collection was Wilson's Baroness Emilia Serrano (1834–1922). The pre Columbian objects in Catalonia appeared in the 19th century when sailors and dealers, known as indianos, came back home bringing curiosities from the Americas.

==== Philippine collection ====
The collection is made up of objects from daily life, war and religious coming from international expositions such as the Anthropological Sciences Contest of Paris in 1878 or the Philippine General Exposition of the Palacio de Cristal del Retiro of Madrid in 1887.

==== Oriental collection ====
The Oriental collection is made of three big donations from Eduard Toda, Francesc Abellá and Juan Mencarini. All of them had a good relationship with Víctor Balaguer. This collection stresses the numismatic collection donated by Juan Mencarini. It is made up of his direct purchase in China and they are represented almost all de dynasties of the Chinese imperial past. It was donated in 1888.

==== Archaeological collection ====
The archaeological collection is made of two big blocks: the foundational donations coming from different parts of the world; and the ones coming from local excavations especially from Garraf, Alt Penedès and Baix Penedès. The main sites represented are Darró, Solicrup, Masia Nova, Cova Verda and Cova de Can Sadurní.

In the foundational donations block there are two groups: 1) donations when Víctor Balaguer was alive, 2) donations after his death until 1939. In the excavations block there are 3 groups: 1) foundational excavations until 1939, 2) excavations carried out by the Studies Centre of the Library Víctor Balaguer (1951–1982) and 3) excavations deposited at the Museum Balaguer until now.

==== Decorative arts collection ====
This collection is made up of other smaller collections (glass, ceramics and metal) that give a full image of Víctor Balaguer's collecting passion. Little but splendid samples that have exceptional objects such as a Mozarabic mortar from the 12th century.

== Children's corner ==
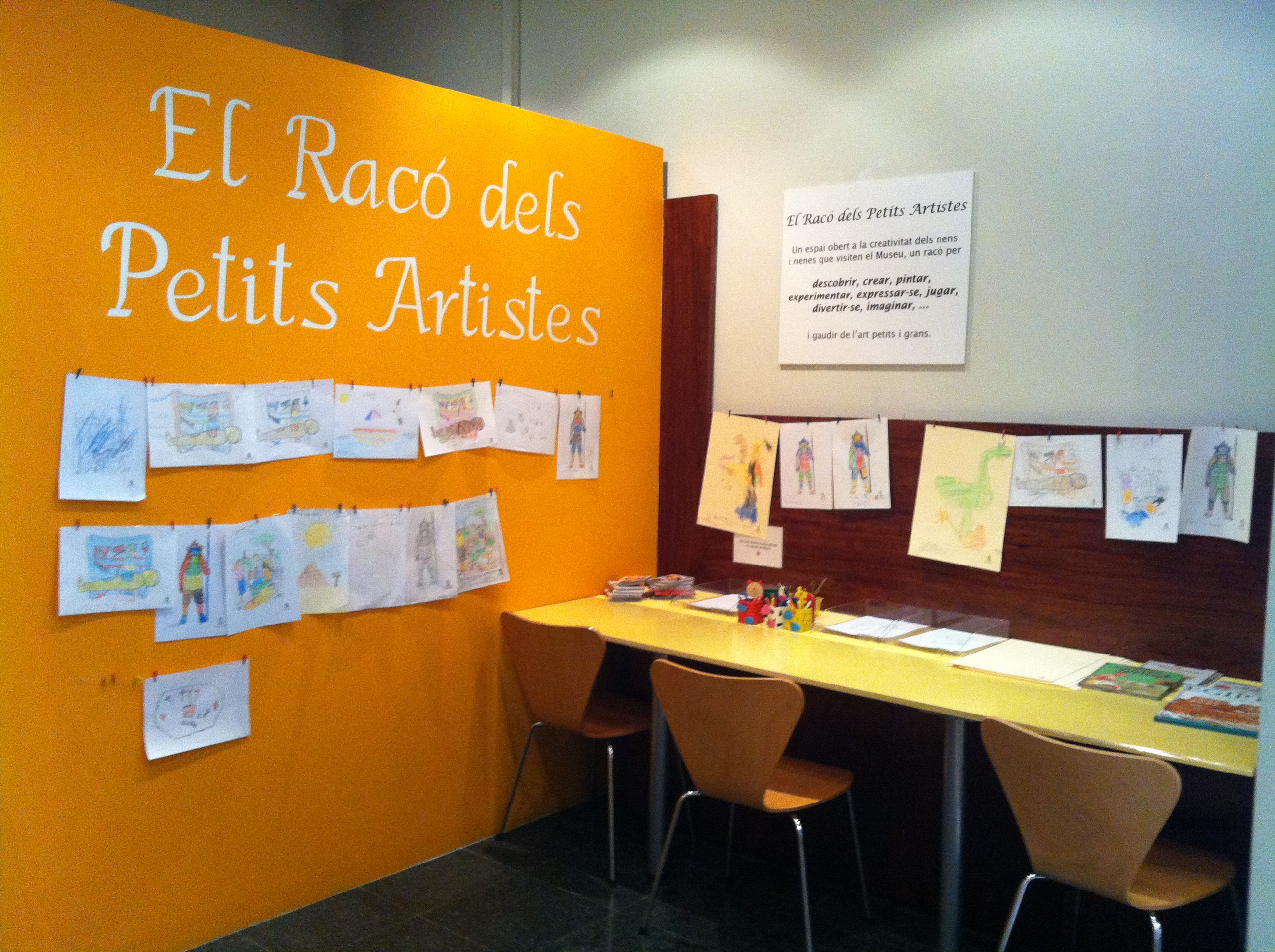
Children's Corner

In December 2010 the Children's Corner was inaugurated. It is a new permanent space in the museum addressed to children, here they can draw and express in an artistic level.

== Tactile look ==
The museum also has a multisensorial module called "Tactile Look", a tactile interpretation space addressed to everybody but especially adapted and designed for those visitors that have visual difficulties, blindness or to disabled people.

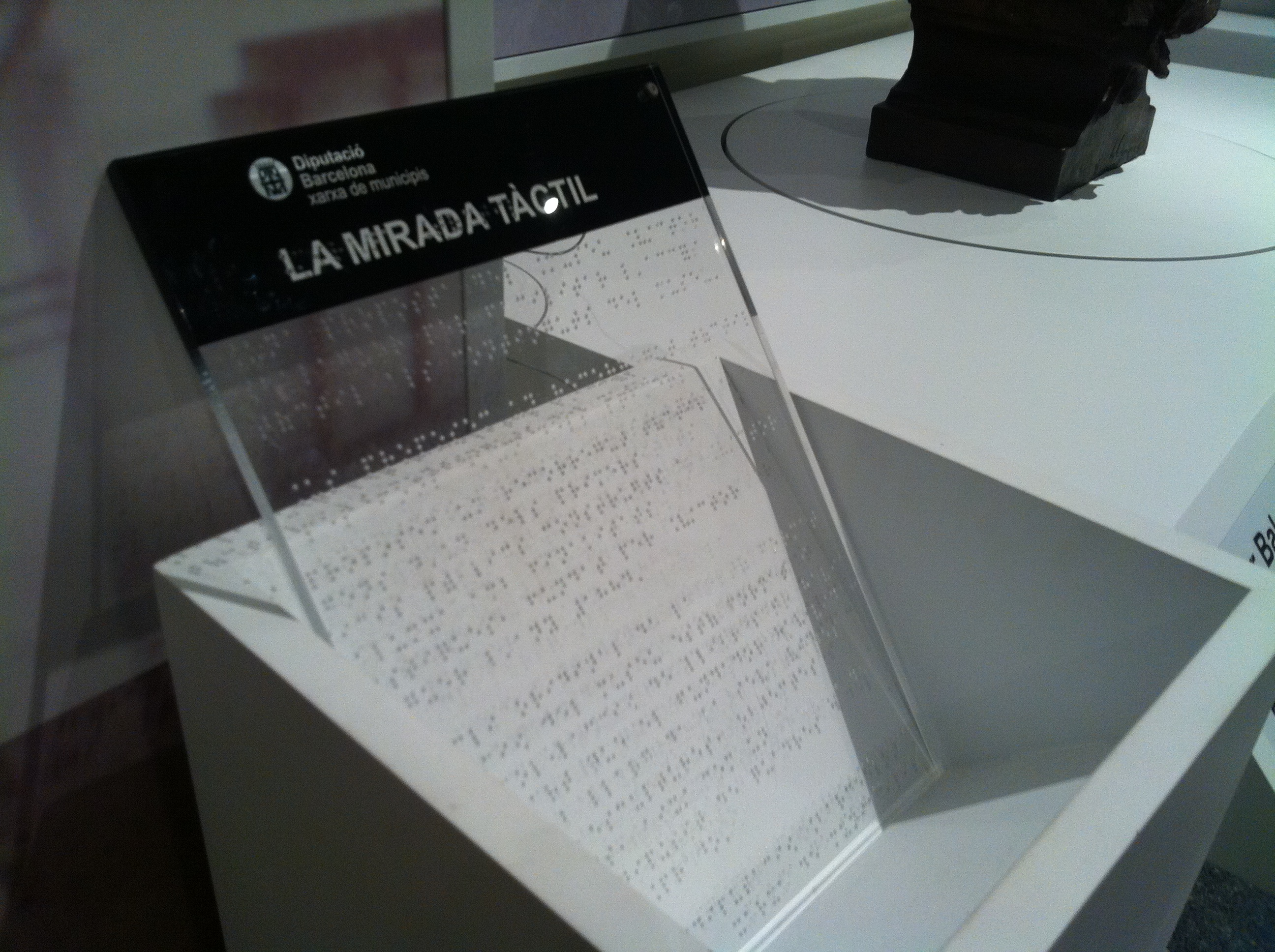

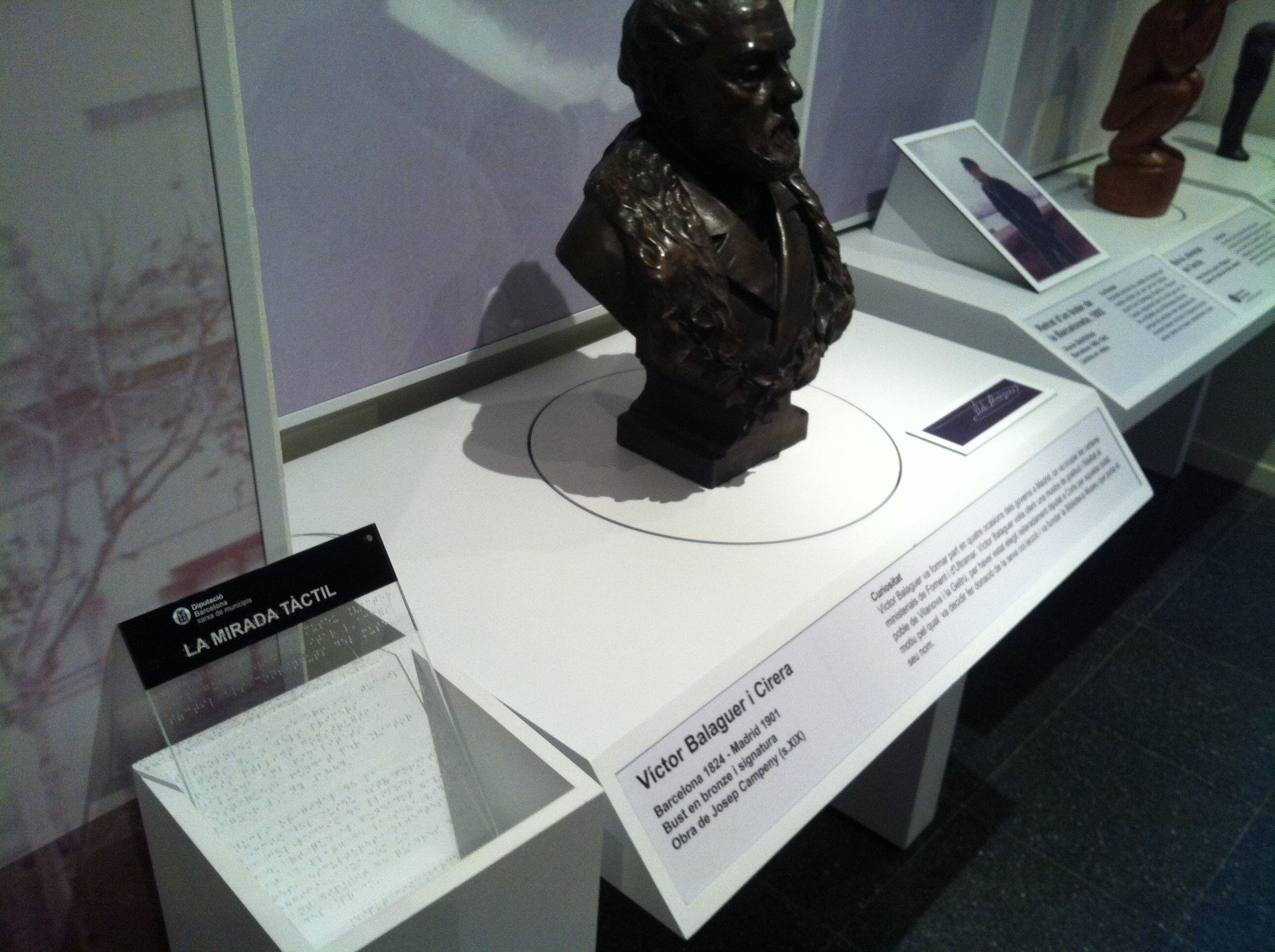

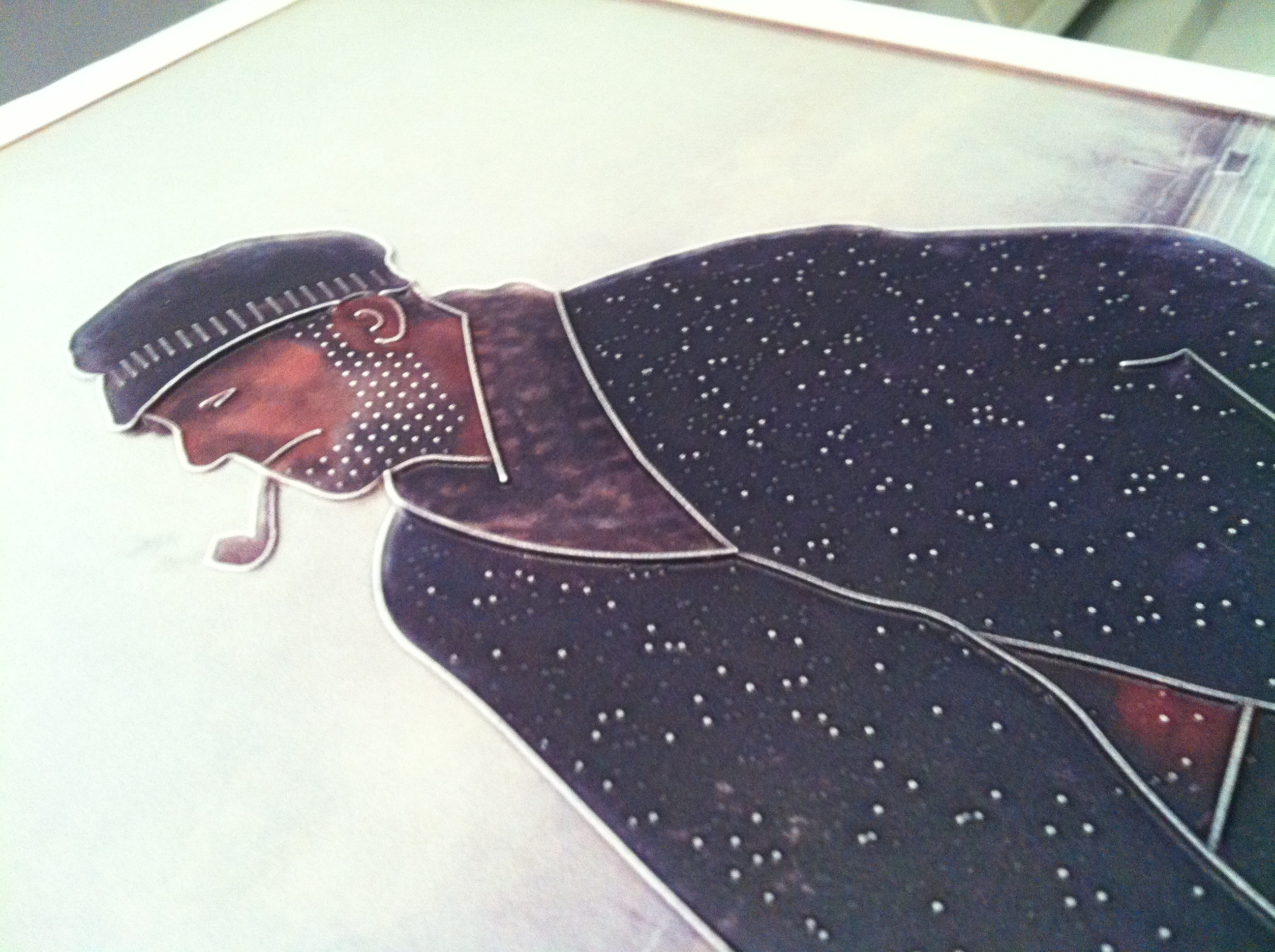

== Library bulletin ==
The Victor Balaguer Library Museum's bulletin (ISSN 0212-6168) is an annual informative publication edited by the Library Museum Víctor Balaguer's Friends' Association. It collects information related with the bibliographic and artistic collection from Balaguer's Institution. It talks about the library's search and the activities carried out during the previous year at the Institution. It is available on the website raco.cat.

== See also ==
- List of museums in Catalonia
- Can Papiol Romanticism Museum

== Bibliography ==
- Muñoz d'Imbert, Sílvia. «Surge et Ambula. 125 anys de la Biblioteca Museu Víctor Balaguer». Bonart [Girona], num. 122 (Desembre 2009), p. 56. ISSN 1885-4389.
- Trullén, Josep Maria (dir). Biblioteca Museu Víctor Balaguer. Guia de les Col·leccions del Museu. Organisme Autònom BMVB, 2001. ISBN 84-931438-3-9.
- Trullén, Josep Maria (dir). Biblioteca Museu Víctor Balaguer. Guia de la visita. Organisme Autònom BMVB, 2007. ISBN 84-920539-8-4.
- Toda i Güell, Eduard. Biblioteca-Museo Balaguer. Catálogo de la Colección Egipcia, 1887. ISBN.
- Boletín de la Biblioteca-Museo Balaguer, 1886,1887,1888.
- Padró i Parcerisa, Josep. Catàleg del Museu Balaguer: col·lecció egípcia, 1987. ISBN 84-393-0791-8.
- Solanilla i Demestre, Victòria. Catàleg del Museu Balaguer: col·lecció pre-colombina, 1988. ISBN 84-393-0876-0.
- Cid Prieto, C. La colección precolombina de la Biblioteca-Museo Balaguer a «Butlletí de la Biblioteca-Museu Balaguer», 5a.època, III., 1955, p. 3-16.
- Miret i Mestre, Magí. Miscel·lània Penedesenca. Joan Bellmunt i Poblet (1915–1990) i la secció arqueològica del Centre d'estudis de la Biblioteca-Museu Balaguer: Un model local d'arqueologia., 1993, pàg. 159–175.
- Jardí i Soler, Eulàlia. Butlletí de la Biblioteca Museu Balaguer. Setena època. Els fons de l'Extrem Orien en el Llegat Fundacional de la Biblioteca Museu Balaguer, Octubre 2010, pàg. 29–44. ISSN 0212-6168.
- Ginés Blasi, Mònica. Butlletí de la Biblioteca Museu Balaguer. Setena època. Estudi preliminar de la col·lecció de moneda xinesa de la Biblioteca Museu Balaguer, Octubre 2011, pàg. 115–128. ISSN 0212-6168.
- Mormeneo de Najas, Lluís. Els arqueòlegs del museu. Els col.leccionistes del XIX.2001, l'Any Víctor Balaguer, «L'Hora del Garraf», 4-maig-2001, pàg. Cultura.
- Mormeneo de Najas, Lluís. Els arqueòlegs del museu. Els arqueòlegs recollidors.2001, l'Any Víctor Balaguer, «L'Hora del Garraf», 11 maig 2001, pàg. Cultura.
- Mormeneo de Najas, Lluís. Els arqueòlegs del museu. Els arqueòlegs precientífics.2001, l'Any Víctor Balaguer, «L'Hora del Garraf», 18 maig 2001, pàg. Cultura.
- Mormeneo de Najas, Lluís. Els arqueòlegs del museu. Els últims arqueòlegs.2001, l'Any Víctor Balaguer, «L'Hora del Garraf», 25 maig 2001, pàg. Cultura.
- Romaní y Guerra, Amador. Catálogo de la Sección de Paletnología Ibérica. Biblioteca Museo Balaguer.. Imprenta Diari Villanueva y Geltrú, 1917.
- Rosich Salvó, Mireia. Butlletí de la Biblioteca Museu Balaguer. Setena època. El Museu en els seus orígens. Quina col.lecció tenía Balaguer abans d'obrir al Museu?, Octubre 2009, pàg. 39–61. ISSN 0212-6168.
