= Can Papiol Romanticism Museum =

Museum in Catalonia, Spain

Coordinates: 41°13′40″N 1°43′29″E

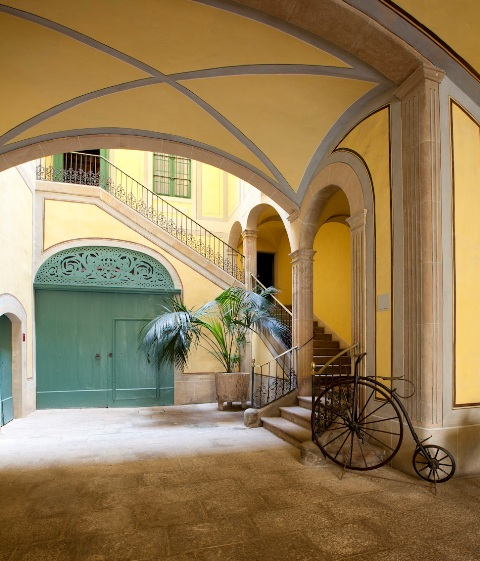
Museum entrance

The Can Papiol Romanticism Museum (Catalan: Museu Romàntic Can Papiol) is a museum located in the historic centre of Vilanova i la Geltrú in Catalonia, Spain. It is a manor house dating from the end of the 18th century and is characteristic both for the furniture and decorative elements preserved from the time. Its aim is to evoke 19th-century society by analysing the everyday life of a well-to-do family of the time.

The museum is part of the Barcelona Provincial Council Local Museum Network.

== History ==
In 1959, a descendant of the Papiol family sold the house and all its furniture to Barcelona Provincial Council, to turn it into a museum. After some restoration work, the museum was opened in 1961 and the Romanticism Museum became a museum with two centres, one in Vilanova and one in Sitges, until 1995, when its management was split.

== The building ==
Can Papiol is the manor house of the Papiol family. The building, comprising a ground floor, first floor, two upper floors and an attic, was built between 1790 and 1801 by politician and scholar Francesc de Papiol. It is Neoclassical in style with decorative elements (ashlars, columns, tympanums) painted on the walls; inside, the walls of the main room are decorated with biblical themed grisailles. The space also has a garden from the Romantic period. Through the analysis of everyday life for a well-to-do family of the time, it brings 19th-century society to life.

== See also ==
- Biblioteca Museu Víctor Balaguer
- Can Llopis Romanticism Museum

== Bibliography ==
- Gou i Vernet, Assumpta (2001). El Museu Romàntic Can Papiol. Guia (in Catalan). Diputació de Barcelona. Àrea de Cultura. ISBN 84-7794-804-6.
