= Maricel Museum =

Coordinates: 41°14′6″N 1°48′45″E

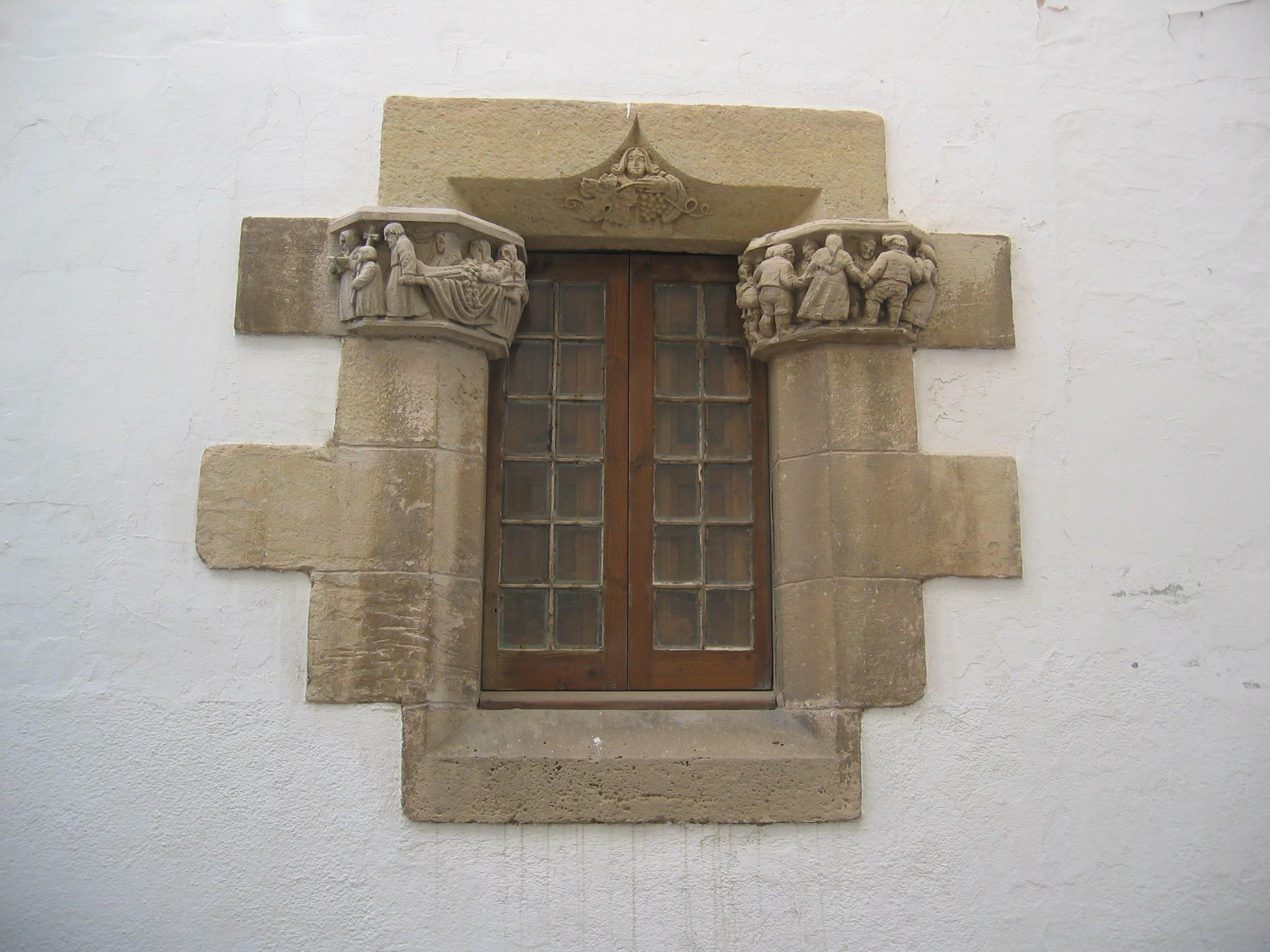
window of the Maricel Palace

The Maricel Museum is a museum located in the centre of Sitges; reopened after a major refurbishment in 2015.

The Maricel Museum is part of the Barcelona Provincial Council Local Museum Network.

== Content ==
In 1969, the Barcelona Provincial Corporation bought the building of Maricel de Mar to house the heterogeneous collection belonging to Doctor Jesús Pérez-Rosales (Manila, 1896-Barcelona, 1989), a well known gynaecologist and enthusiastic collector. A year later the Museu Maricel was inaugurated.

Made up of more than 3 000 items of varying origin, the collection includes Romanesque murals (like the Christ Pantocrator from Santa Maria de Cap d'Aran, dated in the twelfth century), examples of Gothic painting on wood (amongst them two pieces from the altarpiece of Sant Pere de Cubells), Renaissance carvings and altarpieces, Modernista and Noucentista sculptures by Josep Llimona (Distress), Enric Clarasó head of Child Crying, Joan Rebull (Rest, Dawn and Gypsy Child), Josep Clarà, Josep Cañas and Pablo Gargallo (The Reaper), six allegorical murals by Josep M. Sert on the First World War, along with numerous pictures and items of furniture, precious metal, ceramics and porcelain.

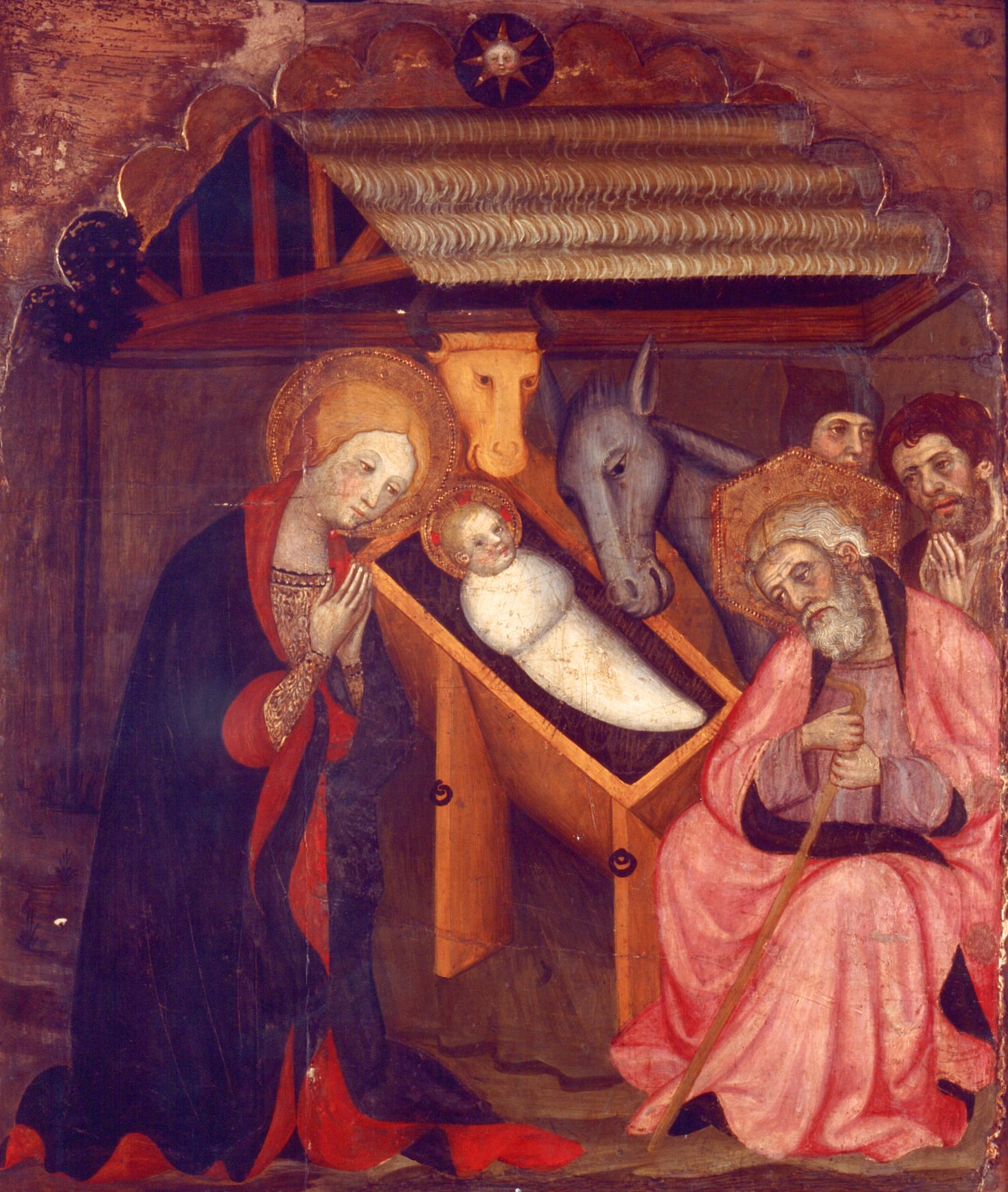
Pere Serra. Panel of the Nativity, from an altarpiece from the church of Sant Pere de Cubells, c. 1400

Since 1995 the Museu Maricel has also housed the "Vila de Sitges" Collection of art, which occupies several rooms on the second floor. In them can be seen some fifty works by Sitges artists of the nineteenth and twentieth centuries and by others who had close links with the town during the same period.

This art collection takes the visitor on an evocative tour of the last two centuries of Catalan painting, from Joaquim Espalter (born in Sitges in 1809) to Pere Pruna (who spent long periods here during the 1940s and 1950s).

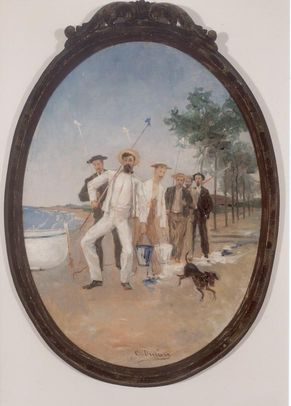
Càndid Duran. Els Pintamones, 1895

The Luminist School of Sitges, which provided a bridge between Marià Fortuny and the Modernistes, is amply represented, with items by Felip Masó (amongst them the emblematic Saint Bartholomew Procession), Joaquim de Miró (The Malvasia Harvest), Josep Batlle i Amell, Arcadi Mas i Fondevila (The Corpus Christi Procession in Sitges), Joan Roig i Soler and Antoni Almirall.

There are also several works by Santiago Rusiñol, in particular Twilight, painted in Biniaraix (Majorca), and the portraits of local figures in Sitges such as Salvador Robert, Pere Forment and Lluís Magrans. There is an exceptional portrait by Ramon Casas of Charles Deering, the man who had the Maricel complex built at the beginning of the twentieth century.

Maternity, by the Sitges painter Joaquim Sunyer, opens the room devoted to Noucentisme, where one can also see canvases and drawings by Agustí Ferrer Pino, Josep Vidal and Josep M. Llopis de Casades, amongst others. The exhibition is completed with items by Artur Carbonell (Girl in Mourning), Guillem Bergnes (Rocks of Sant Sebastià), Alfred Sisquella and Pere Pruna (mentioned above).

Adjoining the "Vila de Sitges" Collection of Art is the Collection on Maritime themes put together by Emerencià Roig i Raventós (Sitges, 1881-Barcelona), 19359 and donated by his brother to Sitges Town Hall. Roig was an important specialist in maritime themes and the author of books like La pesca a Catalunya (1926), La marina catalana del vuit-cents (1929) and Sitges del nostres avis (1934).

The collection consist of a variety of models and miniature boats, drawings and engravings, maps, nautical instruments (sextants, compasses, etc.) and fishing tackle (lobster pots, long lines, hooks, needles for mending nets, etc.), which were once used by fishermen the length of the Catalan coast.

== See also ==
- Cau Ferrat Museum
- Can Llopis Romanticism Museum
