= José Selgas =

Spanish poet, novelist and journalist

The Most Excellent José Selgas
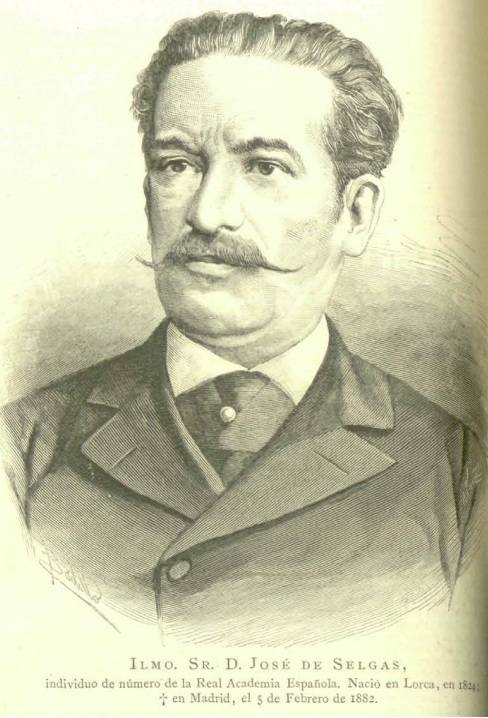
- Born: José Selgas y Carrasco; 27 November 1822; Lorca, Spain
- Died: 5 February 1882 (aged 59); Madrid, Spain

Seat b of the Real Academia Española
- In office 1 March 1874 – 5 February 1882
- Preceded by: Joaquín Francisco Pacheco
- Succeeded by: Víctor Balaguer i Cirera

José Selgas y Carrasco (born Lorca, Murcia on 27 November 1822; died Madrid on 5 February 1882) was a Spanish poet, novelist and journalist.

== Life ==
He received his early training at the Seminary of San Fulgencio; his family being in economically strained circumstances, he was obliged to cut short his studies in order to contribute to its support. Going to Madrid, he there occupied minor Government positions, and engaged in journalism.

As a staunch conservative, he assailed the Liberals in the articles which he wrote for the periodical El Padre Cobos and other newspapers. He acted as secretary for Martinez Campos when the latter was Prime Minister. The Spanish Academy made him one of its members.

== Works ==
Selgas belongs among the minor writers. His repute depends upon his lyrics and his short tales rather than upon his more ambitious novels. The best of his verse, which is generally marked by a gentle melancholy, will be found in the two collections, "La Primavera" and "El Estio", both put forth in 1850. After his death there appeared the volume of poems entitled "Flores y Espinas". Of his longer novels there may be mentioned the "Dos Rivales" and "Una Madre", both rather tedious compositions.

A number of his journalistic articles have been brought together in several of the volumes of his collected works, as "Hojas sueltas", "Estudios sociales", etc.

== Sources ==
- Obras completas, ed. Dubrull (15 vols., Madrid, 1887);
- Garcia, La Literatura espanola en el siglo XIX, pt. I, ii.
