= Arcadi Mas i Fondevila =

Spanish painter

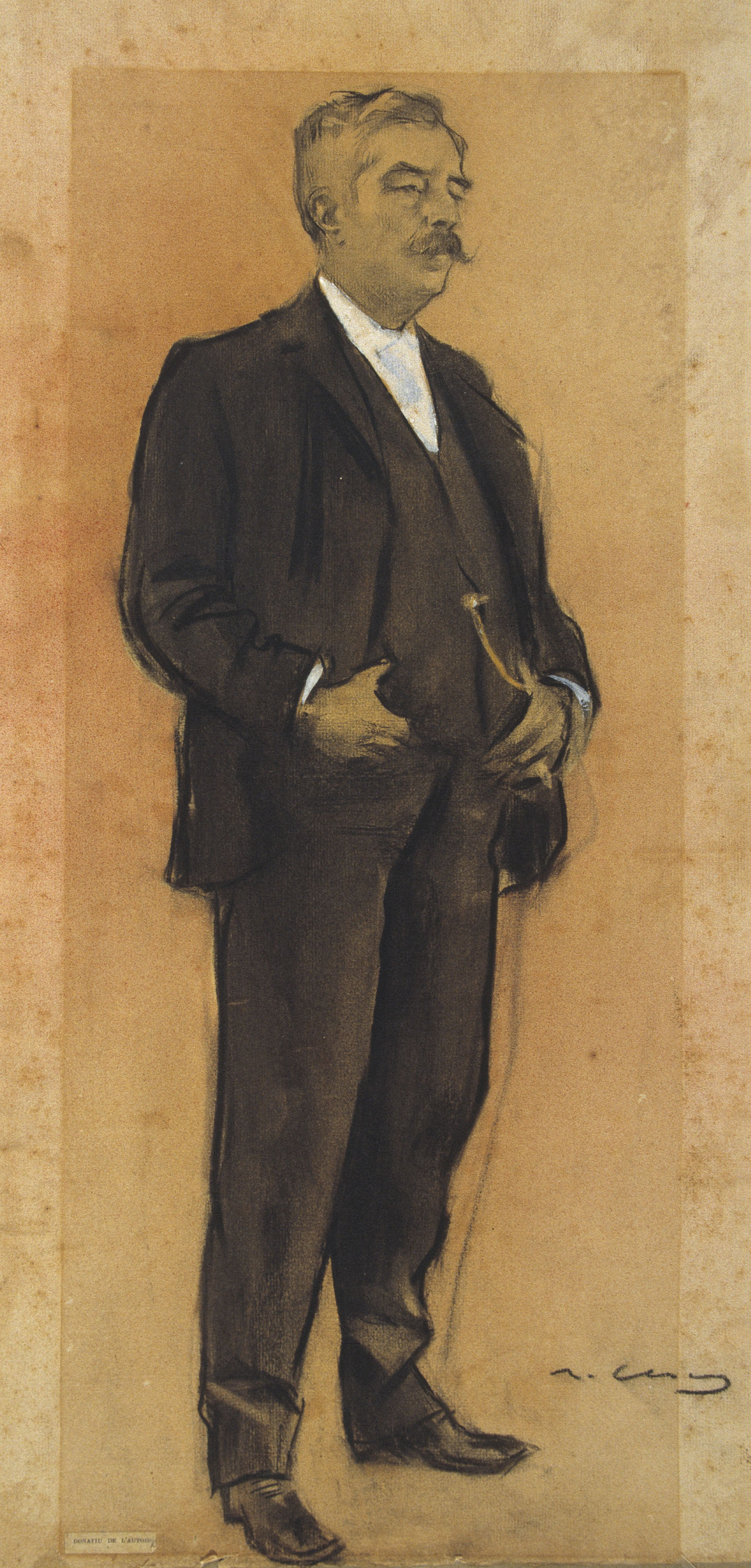
- Arcadi Mas i Fondevila, portrait by Ramon Casas, date unknown
- Born: 12 November 1852; Barcelona, Catalunya, Spain
- Died: 31 January 1934 (aged 81); Sitges, Catalunya, Spain
- Education: Escola de la Llotja, Barcelona
- Known for: Painter, illustrator

Arcadi Mas i Fondevila, or Fontdevila (12 November 1852 in Barcelona – 31 January 1934 in Sitges), was a Catalan painter and graphic artist.

== Biography ==
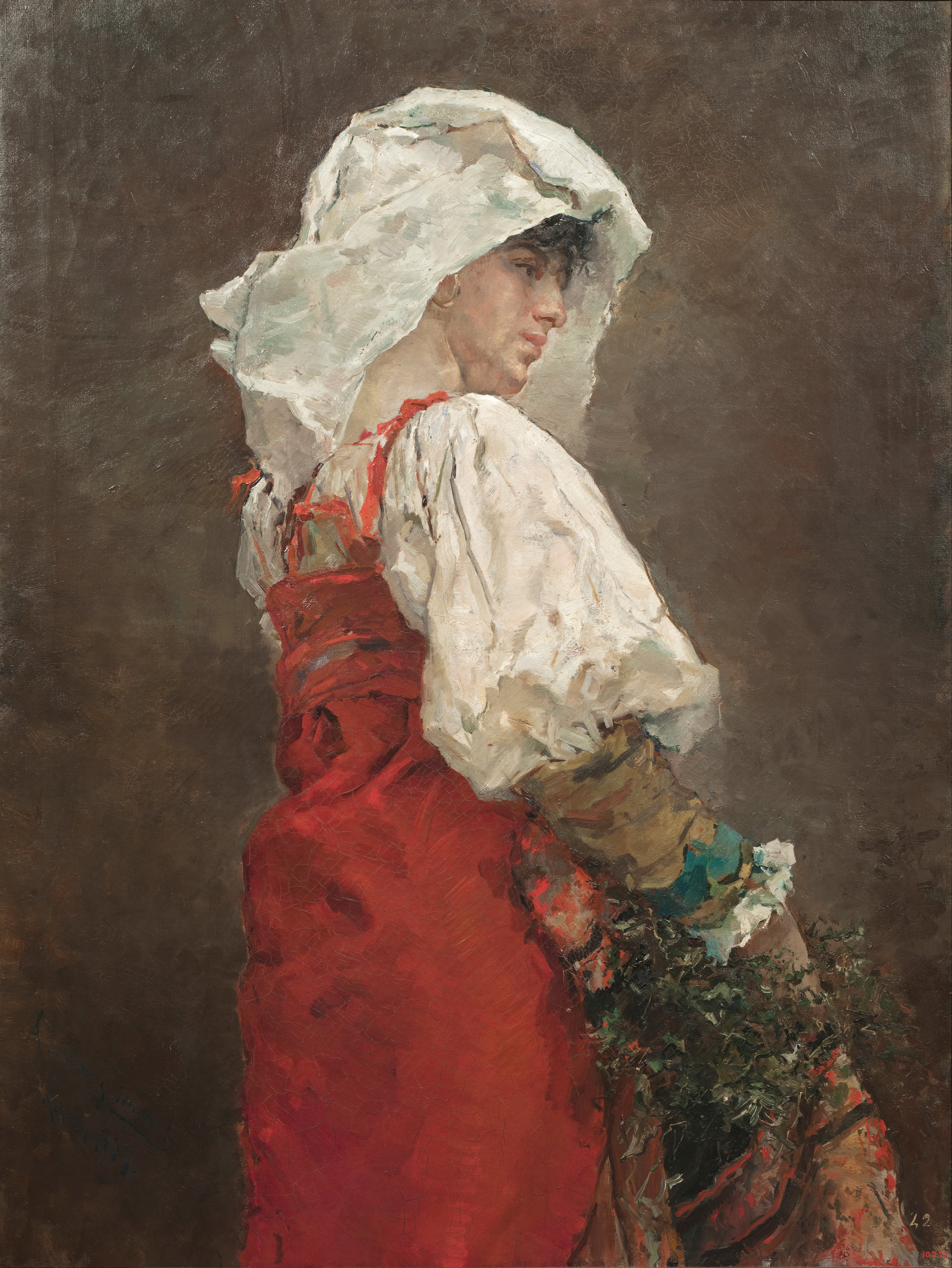
Peasant in Rome

He was the son of a tailor. His father recognized his artistic talent at an early age and enrolled him at the Escola de la Llotja, where he studied with Claudi Lorenzale and Antoni Caba. At the age of twenty, he held his first exhibition at the salon of the "Associació Artística de Barcelona". In 1873, he visited Madrid where he exhibited a painting at a Salon held by the "Real Fábrica de Platería Martinez". It was called "Pel juny la falç al puny" (In June with Sickle in Hand) and was bought the following year by King Alfonso XII.

In 1875, he was awarded the first Fortuny Scholarship by the "Ayuntamento de Barcelona" (the city government), which enabled him to further his studies in Italy. He spent ten years there, visiting several major art centers and sending works home for display at the Sala Parés. During this visit, he was significantly influenced by the work of Domenico Morelli.

Upon his return, his friend Joan Roig i Soler suggested that he come with him to Sitges to work with Santiago Rusiñol. This led to the establishment of the "Escola Luminista", an artistic movement that came to include many notable Catalan painters.

He continued to exhibit widely, including at the 1888 Barcelona Universal Exposition. In the 1890s, he made several trips to Madrid and Granada with Rusiñol to create illustrations for La Vanguardia. After 1895, he worked full-time as an illustrator for La Ilustració Catalana. In 1899, he joined the Cercle Artístic de Sant Lluc and, the following year, had his first exhibition of pastels.

In 1913, thanks to a donation from Charles Deering, a patron from America, he was able to decorate the tympanum of the portal of Saint Catherine at the parish church in Sitges. The original has faded badly with the passage of time, but a copy is currently on display. In 1928, he was among those commissioned to paint murals in the Palau de la Generalitat de Catalunya. His final exhibition came in 1932 at the salon held by "La Pinacoteca", a local art gallery. In 1985, a major retrospective of his work was held at the Maricel Museum.

== Selected paintings ==
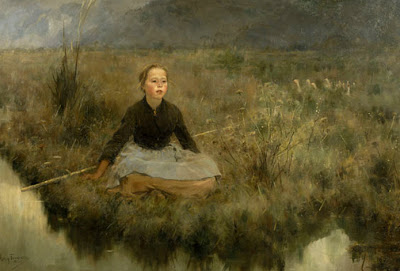
Repose

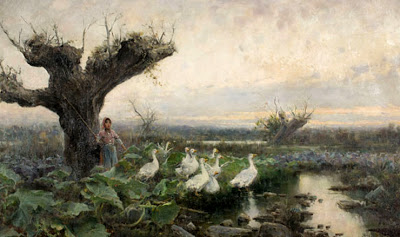
Shepherdess with Geese

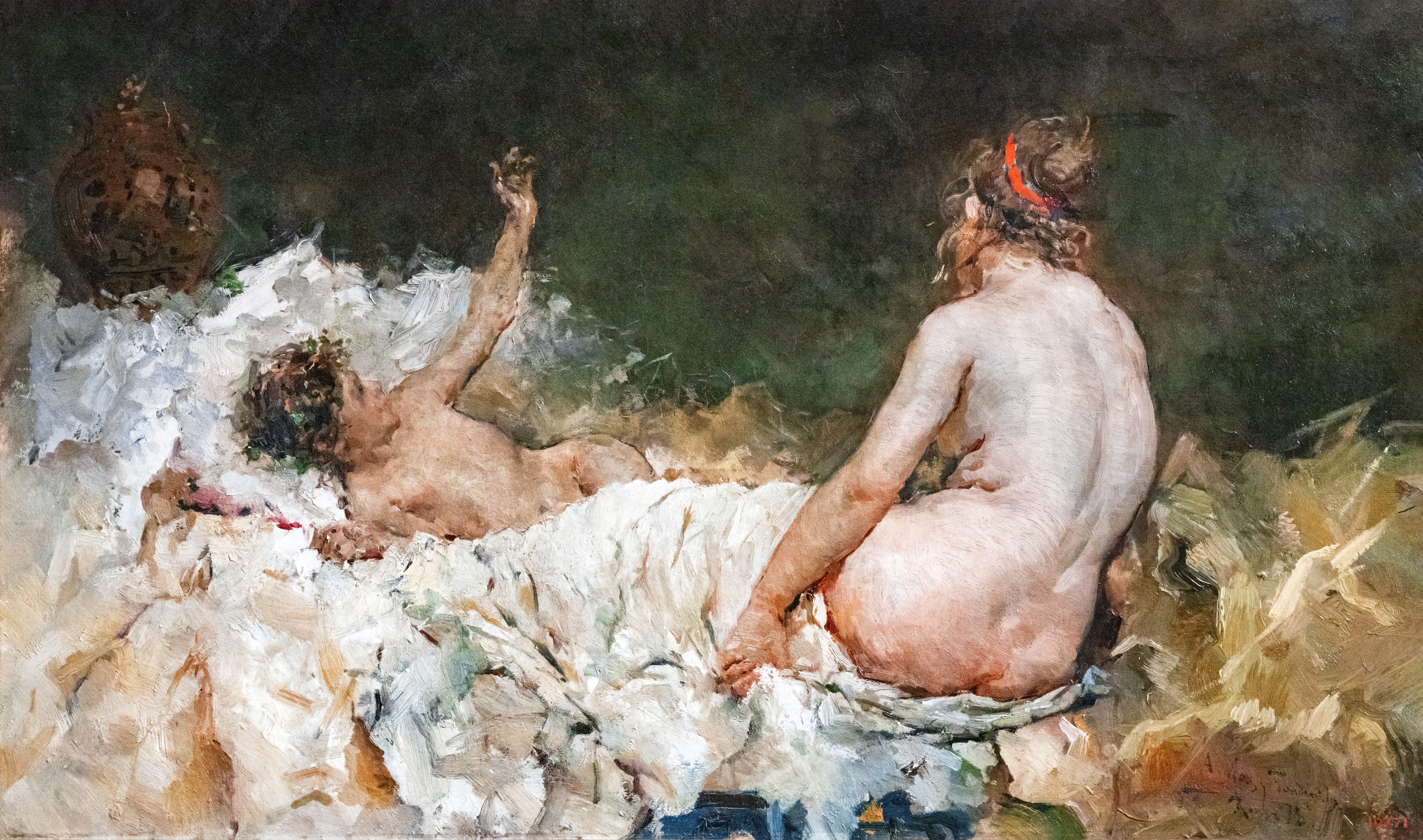
Study (later copied, in part,
by Pablo Picasso)

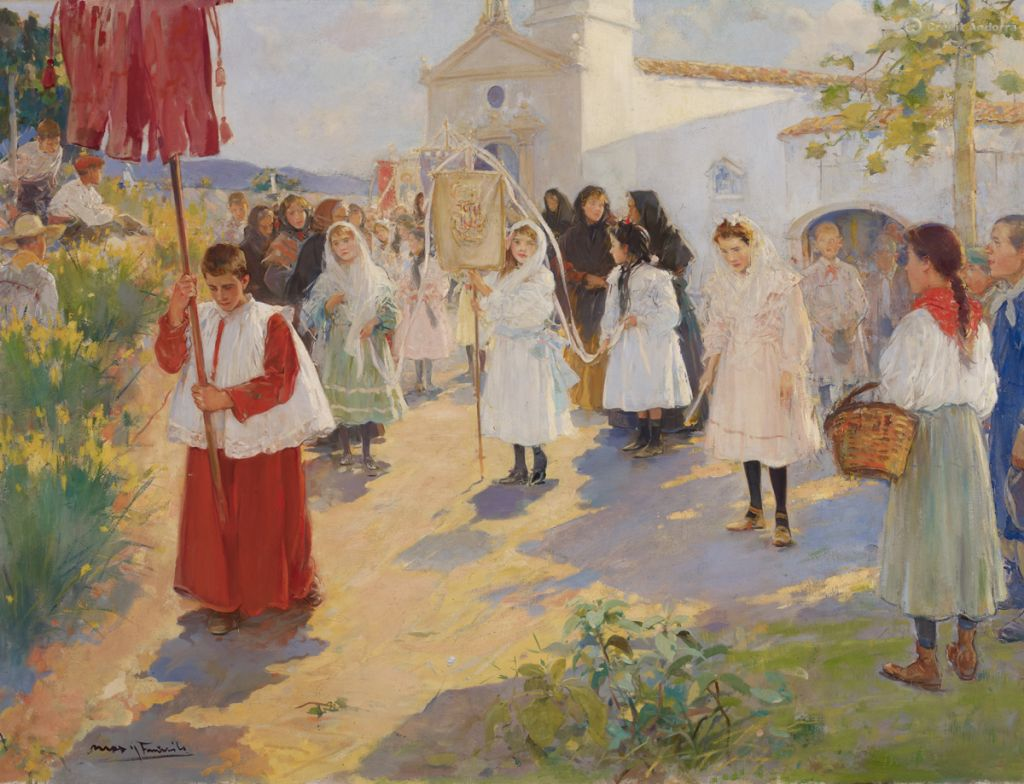
Procession

Pompeian Child
