= Víctor Balaguer i Cirera =

Spanish author and politician (1824–1901)

The Most Excellent Víctor Balaguer
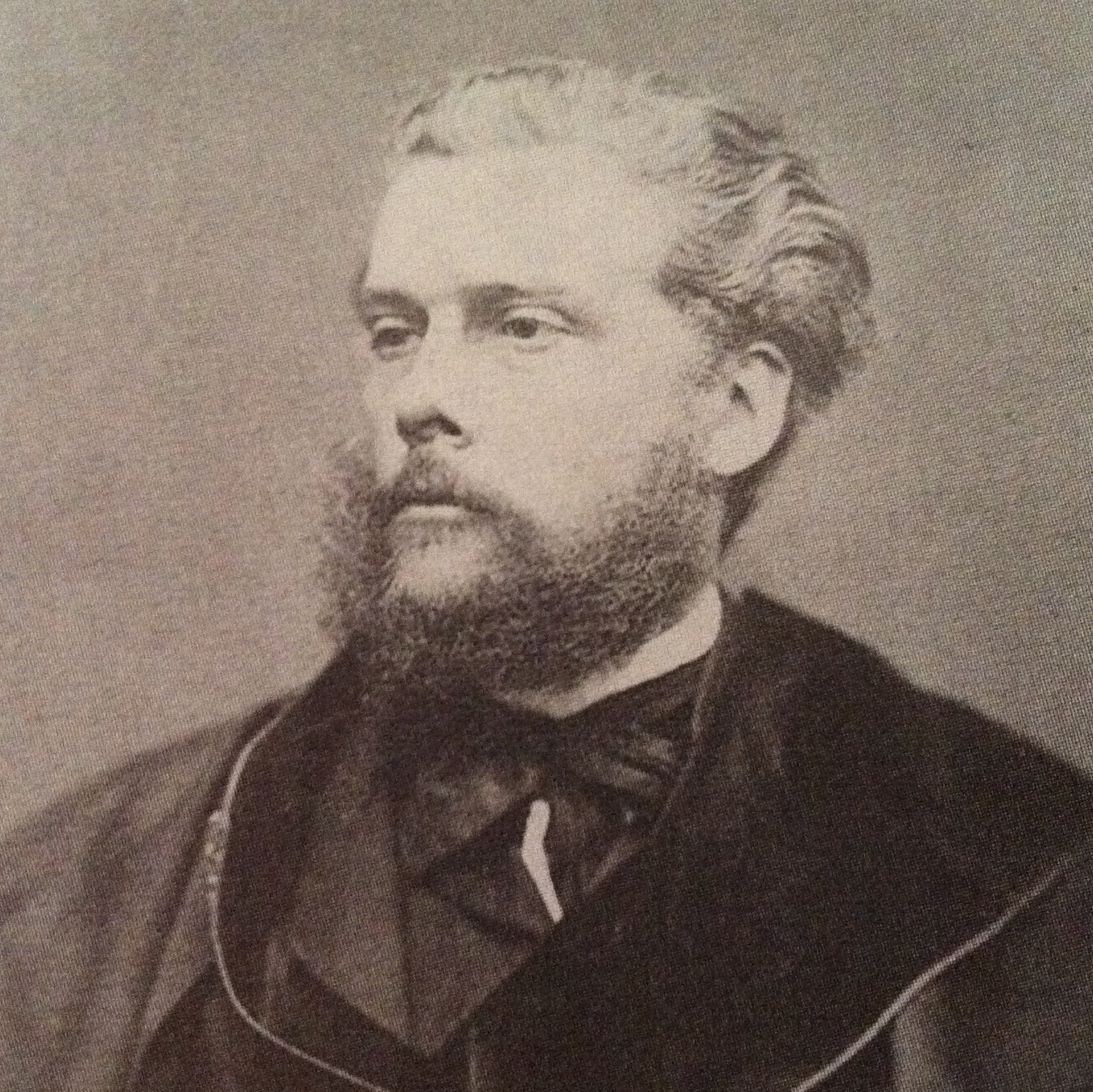
- Born: Víctor Balaguer i Cirera; 11 December 1824; Barcelona, Spain
- Died: 14 January 1901 (aged 76); Madrid, Spain

Seat b of the Real Academia Española
- In office 25 February 1883 – 14 January 1901
- Preceded by: José Selgas
- Succeeded by: Ramón Menéndez Pidal

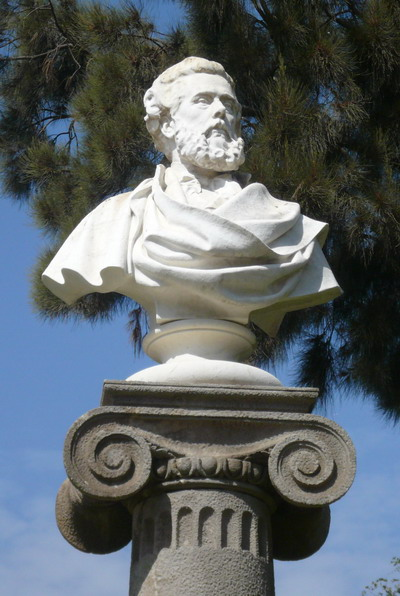
Bust of Balaguer in the Parc de la Ciutadella, Barcelona

Víctor Balaguer i Cirera (Catalan pronunciation: [ˈbiktuɾ βələˈɣe]; 11 December 1824 – 14 January 1901) was a Spanish politician and author. A native of Barcelona, Catalonia, he was educated at the university there.

== Biography ==
His first dramatic essay, Pepín el jorobado, was staged in Barcelona when he was fourteen, and at 19 he was publicly "crowned" after the production of his second play, Don Enrique el Dadivoso. From 1843 to 1868 he was the chief of the Liberal Party in Barcelona, and as proprietor and editor of El Conseller did much to promote the growth of Catalan nationalism. But it was not until 1857 that he wrote his first poem in Catalan – a copy of verses to the Virgin of Montserrat. He was the author of Historia de Cataluña y de la Corona de Aragón in 5 volumes (Barcelona: Salvador Manero, 1860–63).

Henceforward, he frequently adopted the pseudonym of "Lo Trovador de Montserrat"; in 1859 he helped to restore the "Jocs Florals", and in 1861 was proclaimed mestre en gay saber. He went to Madrid, took a prominent part in political life, and in 1867 emigrated to Provence.

With the 1868 Glorious Revolution and overthrow of Queen Isabella II of Spain, he returned to Spain and represented Manresa in the Cortes, and in 1871—1872 was successively Overseas Minister and Finance Minister. He resigned during the Restoration, but finally followed his party in rallying behind the Bourbon monarchy; he was appointed vice-president of the Congress, and subsequently was a senator. He died in Madrid on 14 January 1901.

== Works ==
1868 edition of Los bandolers catalans o lo ball d'en Serrallonga

=== Press ===
A Freemason, liberal and of romantic ideas, he contributed to several liberal newspapers such as El Constitucional, El Laurel, El Genio. Semanario de Literatura, Artes, Teatros y Modas, and La Lira. In 1846 he moved to Madrid, where he met major literary and political figures of the time. In Barcelona, he founded the liberal newspaper La Corona de Aragón, promoting both a proud Catalan past and decentralisation for the former Crown of Aragon territories. From 1893 to 1895 he issued the monthly Pro Patria to spread his political views.

=== Theatre ===
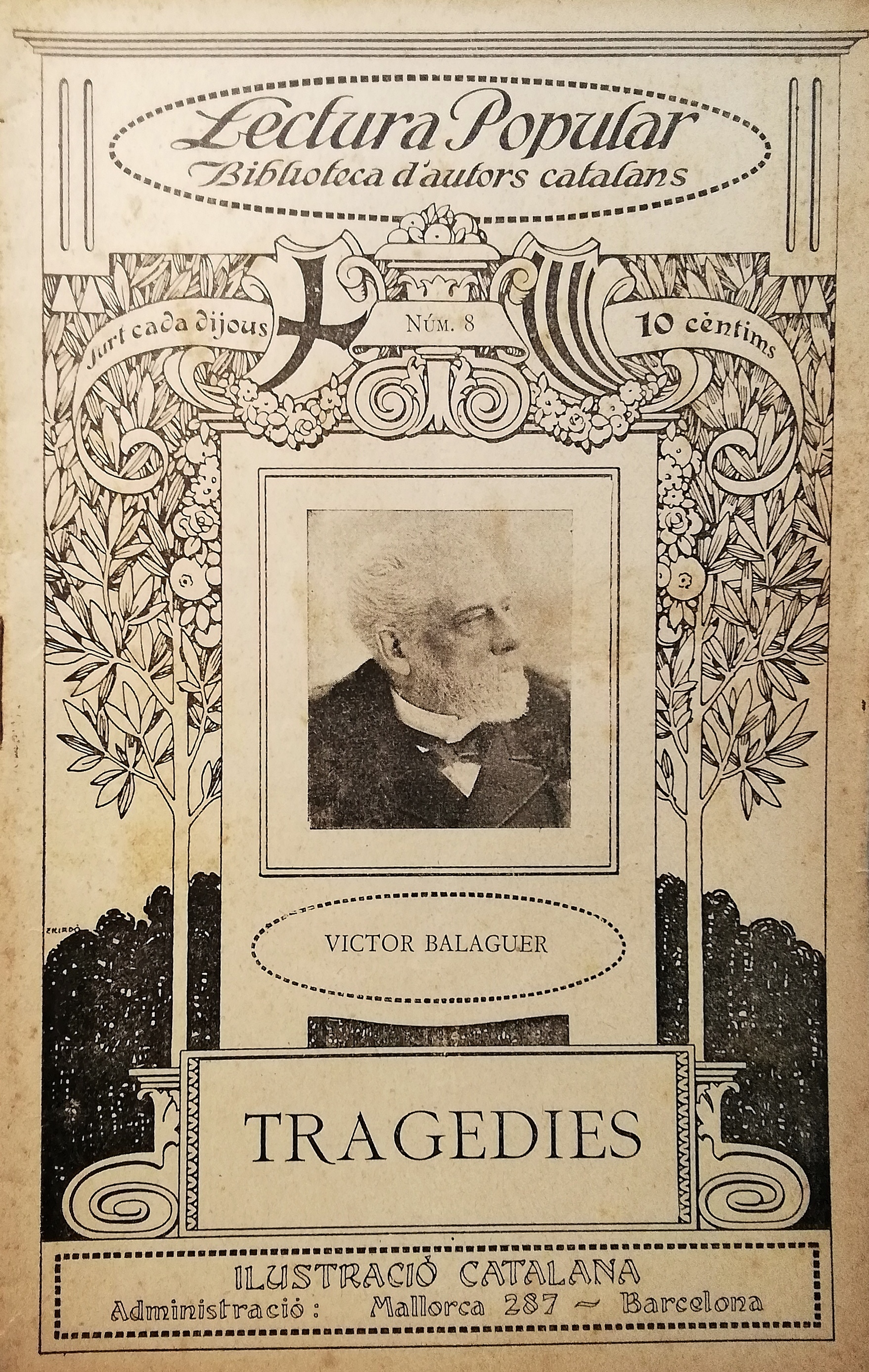
Tragedies: La mort d'Aníbal – Saffo – La tragèdia de Llivia, by Víctor Balaguer. 1913 edition, Lectura Popular collection

- In Spanish:*
- Pepín el Jorobado o el hijo de Carlomagno (1838)
- Enrique el Dadivoso (1844)
- Juan de Padilla (1847)
- Vifredo el Velloso (1848)
- Los cuatro palos de sangre (second part of Vifredo el Velloso)
- In Catalan:*
- Don Joan de Serrallonga (1868)
- Tragedies: *La mort d'Aníbal*, *Coriolà*, *L'ómbra de Cessar*, *Lo festí de Tibullus*, *La mort de Neró*, *Saffo*
- New tragedies: *La tragèdia de Llívia*, *L'última hora de Colon*, *Lo guant del degollat*, *Les esposalles de la morta*
- Los Pirineus (1893), used as the libretto for the opera by Felip Pedrell:
  - El Comte de Foix
  - Raig de Lluna
  - La Jornada de Pannissars

=== Poetry ===
- *Llibre de l'Amor*, *Llibre de la Fe*, *Llibre de la Pàtria* – embodying the Floral Games motto "Pàtria, fe i amor."
- Los trobadors moderns (1859)
- Lo trobador de Montserrat (1861)
- Esperances i records (1866)
- Lo romiatge de l'ànima (1891)

=== Novels ===
- Don Joan de Serrallonga (1858)
- La bandera de la mort (1859)

=== Studies and Essays in Spanish ===
- Bellezas de la historia de Cataluña (1853)
- Historia de Cataluña y de la Corona de Aragón (1860–63)
- Las calles de Barcelona (1865)
- Historia política y literaria de los trovadores (1878–79)
- Instituciones y reyes de Aragón (1896)
- La libertad constitucional (1857)
- Memorias de un constituyente (1868)
- El Regionalismo y los Juegos Florales (1897)

=== History ===
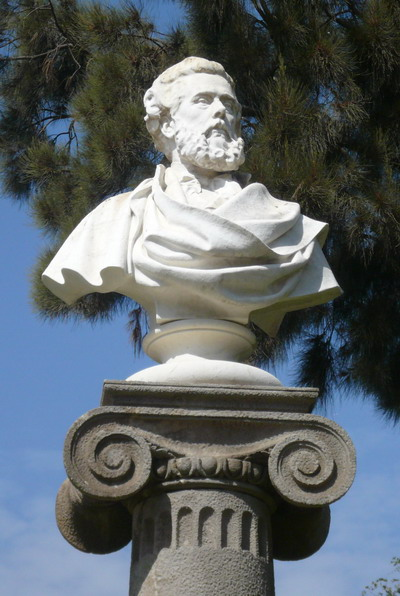
Bust of Víctor Balaguer in the Parc de la Ciutadella, Barcelona

In his historical work, he did not uncover archival discoveries and was not strictly critical, often merging legend with fact, a trait of his romantic‑liberal style that drew criticism from rivals. He positioned himself as an effective populariser of Catalan history from a liberal viewpoint, resisting strict scholarly examination.

His 1852 lectures, initially titled *Bellezas de la historia de Cataluña*, formed the basis of the acclaimed *Historia de Cataluña y de la Corona de Aragón* (1860–64). The work's success led to a new edition in 1885 under *Història de Catalunya*.

==== Eixample of Barcelona ====
He proposed a street‑naming plan for the Eixample, honoring territories of the Crown of Aragon (Aragó, València, Mallorca, Rosselló, Còrsega, Sardenya, Sicília, Nàpols), Catalan institutions (Corts Catalanes, Diputació, Consell de Cent) and historical figures (Pau Claris, Roger de Llúria, Roger de Flor). Though largely adopted, the plan was divided and altered under dictatorship, and partially restored during democracy; e.g. Compromís de Casp became simply Carrer de Casp.

== See also ==
- Biblioteca Museu Víctor Balaguer
