= Can Llopis Romanticism Museum =

Museum in Catalonia, Spain

- Museu Romàntic Can Llopis
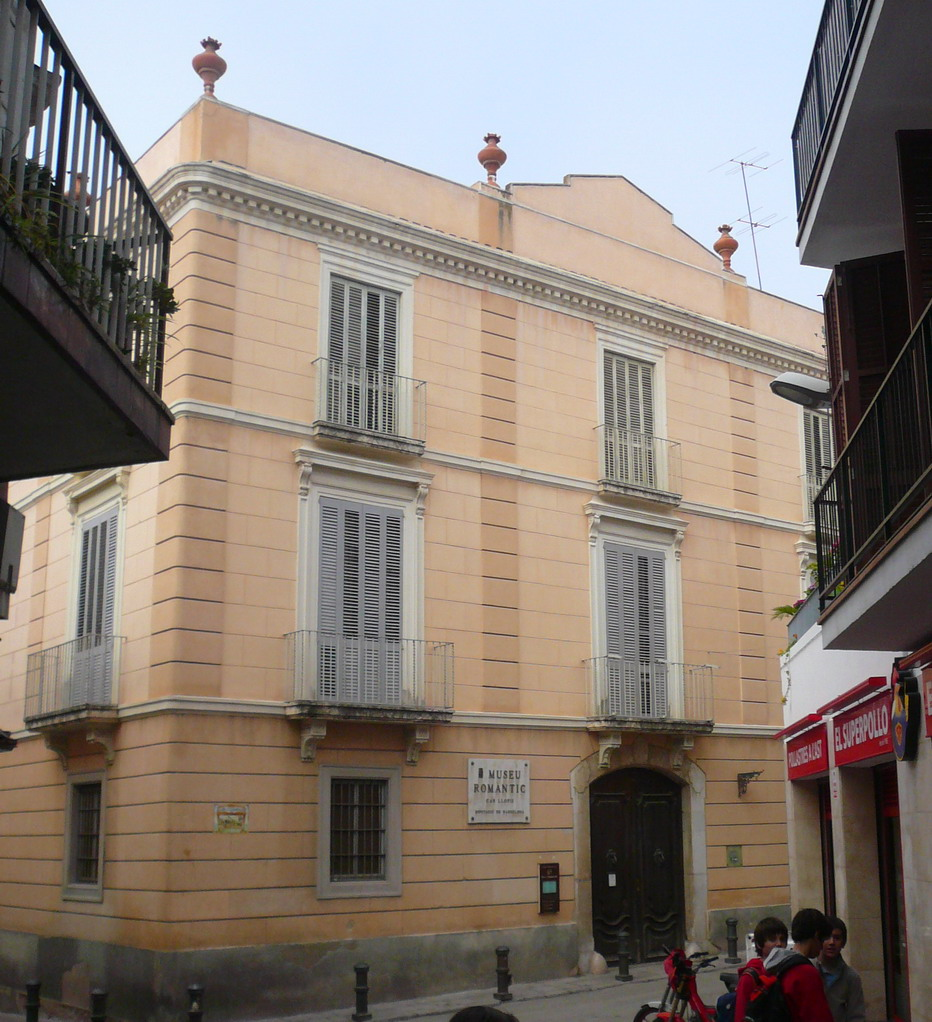
- Can Llopis façade
- Location: Sitges
- Coordinates: 41°14′13″N 1°48′28″E
- Website: museusdesitges.cat/en

The Can Llopis Romanticism Museum (Catalan: Museu Romàntic Can Llopis) is a museum located in Neoclassical-style building in the centre of Sitges and is part of the Barcelona Provincial Council Local Museum Network.

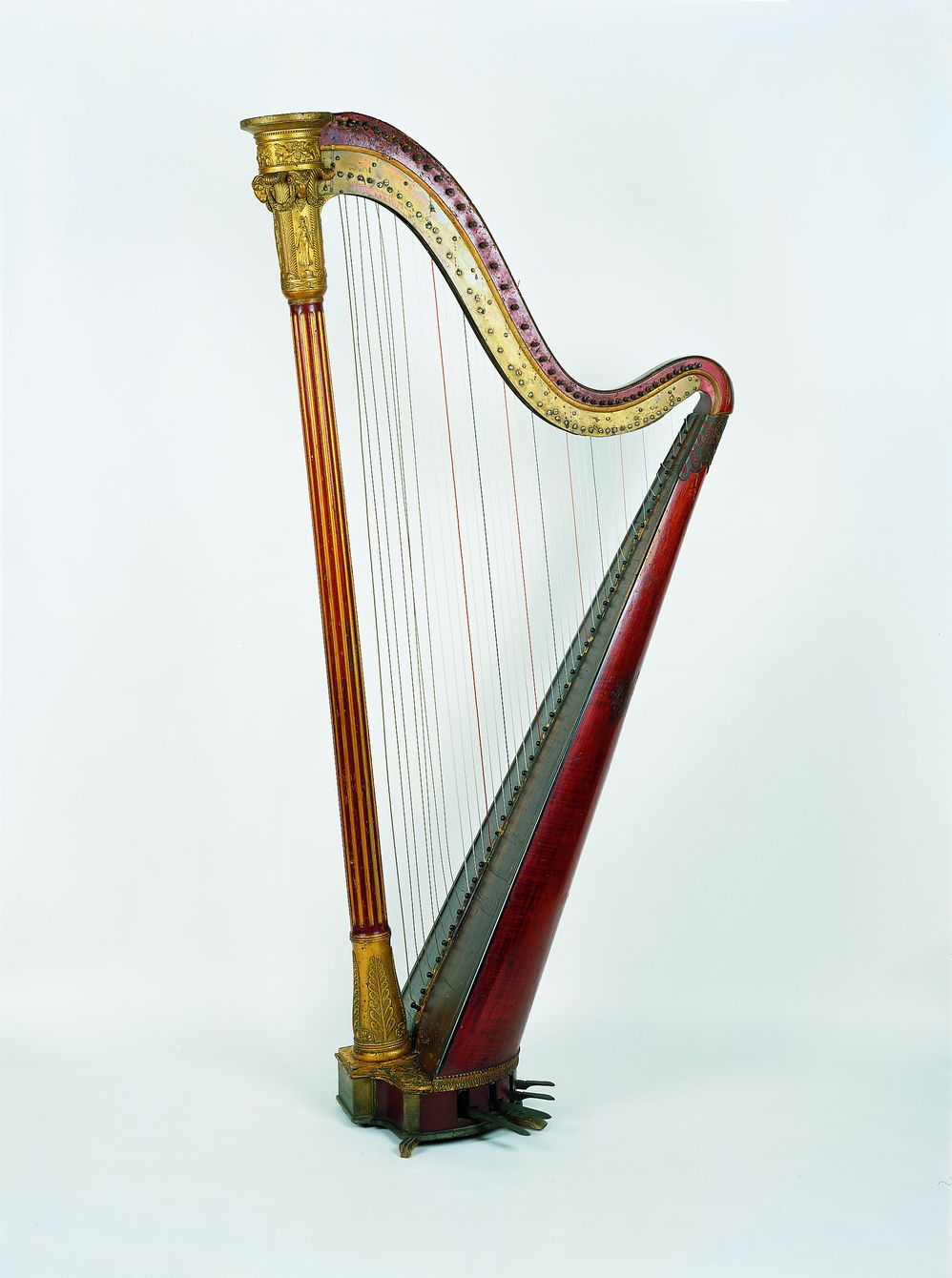
Erard Frères. Harp. Paris, 1800-1830

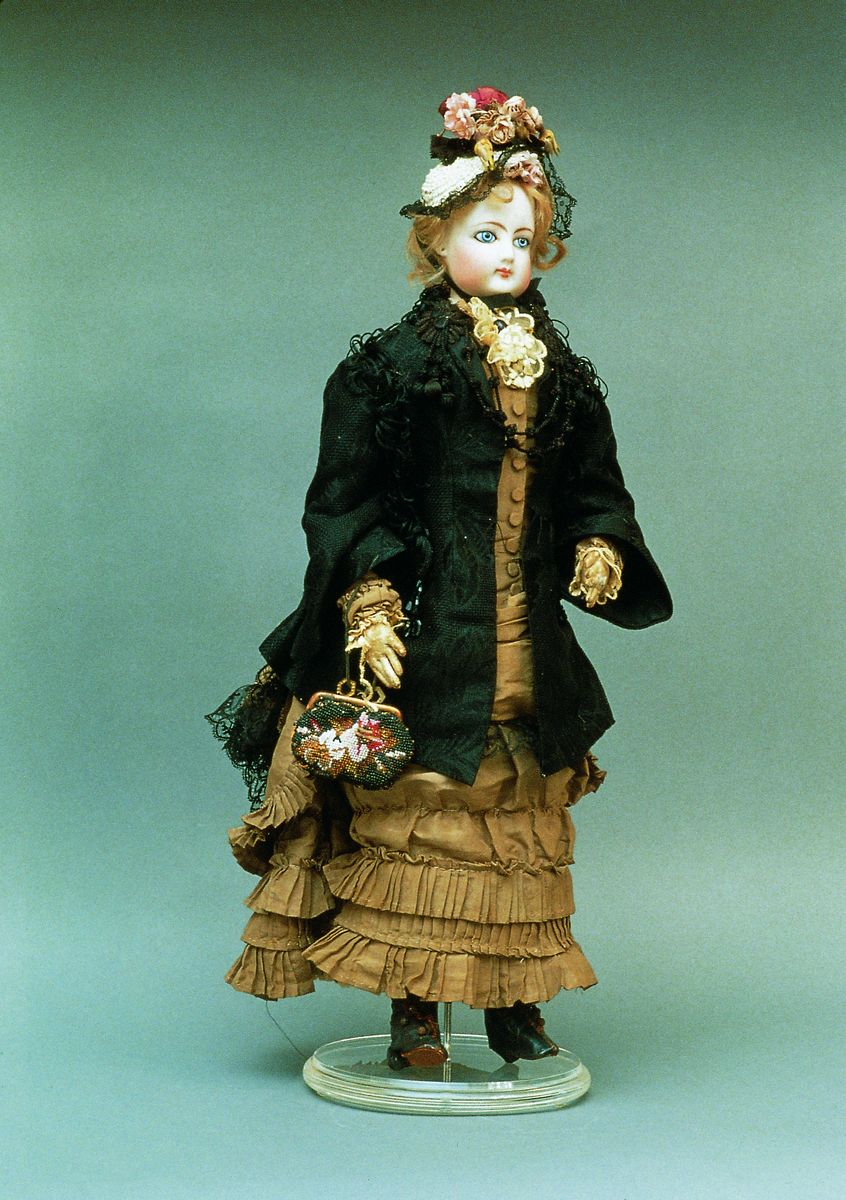
Porcelain doll in period dress. France, 1877

== History ==
The Museu Romàntic is located in the former Casa Llopis, built in 1793 outside the walls of the medieval town. For many years it was one of the most impressive stately homes in Sitges's new district. It was the home of several generations of the Llopis family, local people of seafaring origin who had climbed the social ladder thanks to the accumulation of land and the trade in wines and liquors.

Casa Llopis reached its greatest splendour during the second third of the nineteenth century, when the owner of the house was Bernardí Llopis i Pujol (1814-1891), one of the most influential and popular figures in nineteenth-century Sitges. At that time, the local post office was located on the ground floor of the mansion, as we can see from the letter box in the form of a lion with its mouth open next to the front door.

In 1935, the last heir of the family, the diplomat Manuel Llopis de Casades(1885-1935), bequeathed the family home to the Generalitat de Catalunya (Catalan Government) for conversion as a museum. The process was interrupted by the Civil War, until in 1943 the executors offered the bequest to the Provincial Deputation of Barcelona. After a series of repairs, the rooms on the main floor were opened to the public in 1949, followed later by the ground-floor rooms, the garden, the cellars and the library.

== Displays ==
The sobriety of the decoration on the outside of the building contrasts with its colourful interior, which takes the visitors back in time to plunge into the everyday atmosphere of a well-to-do nineteenth-century family. In the different rooms on the main floor (the music room, the ballroom, the dining room, the bedrooms) are a succession of items of furniture of different styles, mural paintings, Meissen porcelain, Murano and Bohemian glass, musical instruments, clocks and numerous objects for personal use. In addiction, one can follow the development of the different lighting systems that existed in the nineteenth century, from oil lamps to the advent of gas lighting.

The first-floor gallery and the garden are the most attractive and evocative parts of the house. In the gallery can be seen two walls decorated with children's scenes and, on the paving, a "Bis Bis" from the Napoleonic era, a game consisting of forty-nine polychrome tiles, with which the Llopis family and their guests amused themselves.

The cellar, were the Llopis family made their famous Malvasia, also deserves special attention. Today the Hospital de Sant Joan Baptista is the owner of the brand, and the vineyards bequeathed by the last heir of Casa Llopis, on condition that the institution should preserve the cultivation and the quality of Sitges Malvasia.

The second floor of the Museum Romàntic, which used to be the staff quarters, has since the 1970s housed the curious collection of dolls and toys belonging to the writer and illustrator Lola Anglada, who donated it to the museum. The collection contains more than 400 items from the seventeenth century, plus numerous items from the eighteenth and nineteenth centuries. They are made from wood and papier-mâché, porcelain and there are also some clockwork dolls endowed with music and movement.

Lola Anglada's collection isn't a result of the wish to find unique specimens, but of a sentimental urge to recover in the poses and clothes of these dolls the lost ways of life of nineteenth-century society.

== See also ==
- Maricel Museum
- Can Papiol Romanticism Museum
