= Andreu Alfaro =

Spanish sculptor

Andreu Alfaro Hernández (5 August 1929 – 13 December 2012) was a Spanish sculptor.

== Biography ==
Alfaro was born in Valencia in 1929, the son of a butcher. A self-taught artist, he was related to the Valencian artists collective Parpalló Group (1957), and influenced by constructivists, such as Constantin Brâncuşi or Antoine Pevsner, and by Jorge Oteiza.

He began to develop his work as a sculptor in the late 1950s, experimenting with metallic materials such as steel and aluminium. In 1966 he participated for the first time in the Venice Biennale, showing "My Black Brother". In 1980 he received the Prize of Honor Jaume I, and in 1981 the National Prize of Fine Arts of Spain. In 1995 he was again invited to participate in the Venice Biennale.

Alfaro learned the principles of geometry and applied his knowledge to create abstract works. His sculptures are usually full of nuances that play with the module, the series and light and color. He was also described as a minimalist artist, albeit with reservations.

There are works by Alfaro in museums around the world and on public roads in many towns, particularly in Spain and Germany.
