= Conca de Barberà (DO) =

Coordinates: 41°22′38″N 1°9′50″E

Conca de Barberà DOP
- Wine region
- Conca de Barberà DOP in the province of Tarragona in the region of Catalonia
- Official name: Denominació d'Origen Protegida Conca de Barberà
- Type: Denominación de Origen Protegida (DOP)
- Year established: 1989
- Country: Spain
- Size of planted vineyards: 4,185 hectares (10,341 acres)
- No. of wineries: 26
- Wine produced: 6,172 hectolitres
- Comments: Data for 2016 / 2017

Conca de Barberà DOP in Catalonia

Conca de Barberà is a Spanish Denominación de Origen Protegida (DOP) (Denominació d'Origen Protegida in Catalan) for wines located in central Catalonia in the northern portion of the Tarragona Province. Situated within the river valleys of the Francolí and Anguera, it has historically been known for its white wines, but has been gaining more attention for its reds, especially those from the native Trepat grape. Today, the Conca de Barberà DOP mainly produces red wines, along with whites, and minor amounts of rosés and sparkling wines.

== History ==
It is highly probable that wine production was introduced by the ancient Romans but by the time of the Moorish dominion of the Iberian Peninsula it had all but disappeared from the Conca de Barberà area. As in many other wine producing regions, wine production took off again thanks to the influence of the monasteries founded in the Middle Ages, in this case the Monastery of Santa Maria de Poblet, near Montblanc which was then the third largest city of Catalonia. In the 12th century both the Knights Templar and the monks from Poblet worked the vineyards. The wine was produced in the basement of the monastery and can be visited today.

The period from the end of the 18th century to the mid 19th century was one of expansion for the area. Wines and spirits were exported to northern Europe and to the Americas and grapes became the dominant crop. In this period terraces were built on the mountainsides to increase the area under vines as much as possible. The railway connecting Montblanc to Reus on the coast was built in order to transport wine more rapidly and efficiently.

The arrival of the phylloxera virus at the end of the 19th century marked the end of this boom period as most of the vineyards were devastated. However the comeback was spectacular. The Conca de Barberà area was the first in Catalonia, and in the rest of Spain, to form agricultural cooperatives based on grape growing and wine production.

Thus in 1894 the grape growers of Barberà founded a syndicate for collective wine production. Under the direction of Joan Espulgas (a vintner who had learned how to combat the phylloxera virus in France) the syndicate undertook the project of replanting all the vineyards in the Conca area, by grafting onto phylloxera resistant New World rootstock. Success ensued and in 1903 the first cooperative winery in Spain was built in the town of Barberà.

Conca de Barberà attained official DO status in 1985.

== Geography ==
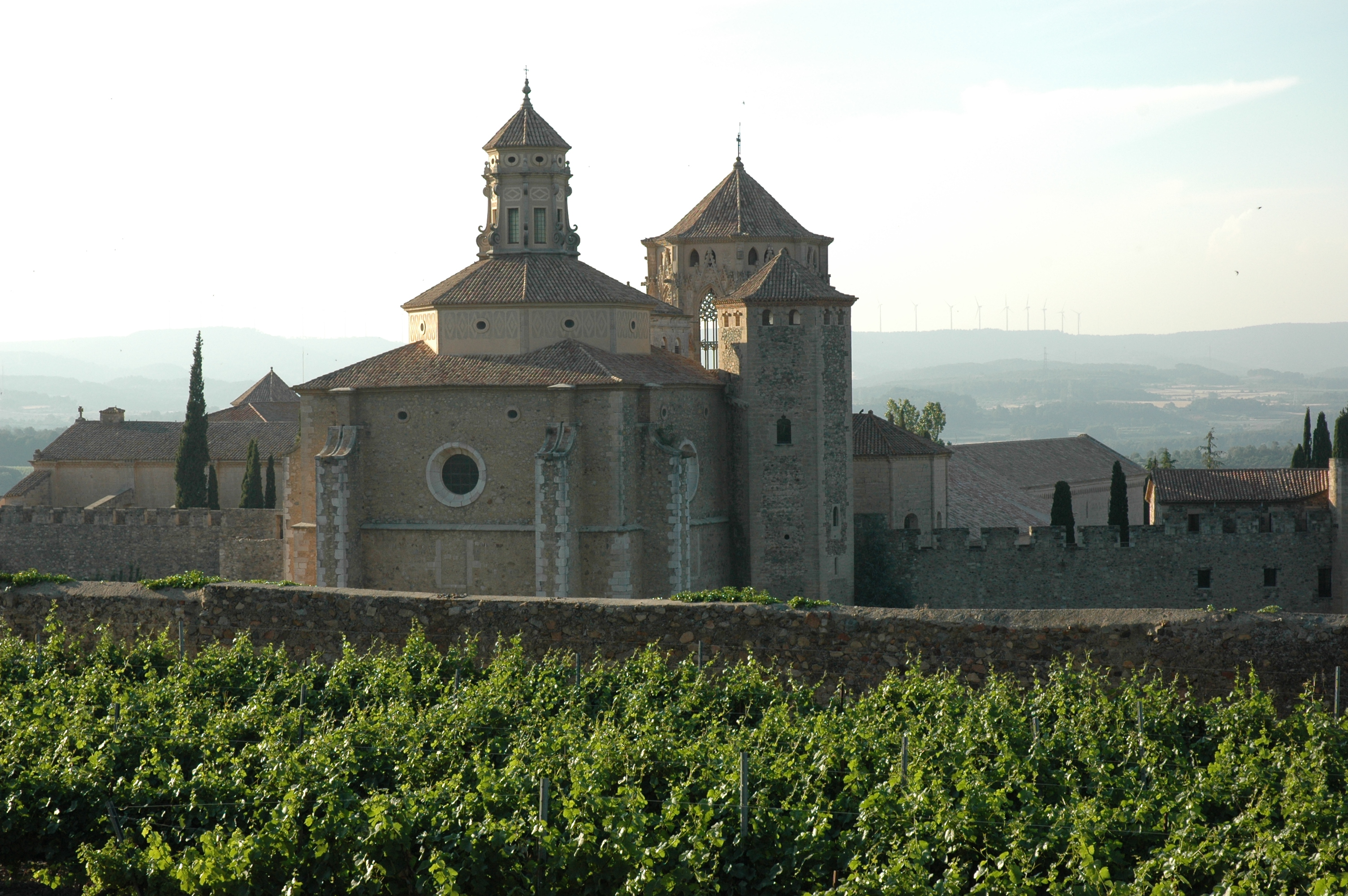
Vineyards near Poblet Monastery

Most of the vineyards are located around the historic town of Montblanc, and the DOP covers a total of 14 municipalities in the north of the province of Tarragona: Barberà de la Conca, Blancafort, Conesa, L'Espluga de Francolí, Forès, Montblanc, Pira, Rocafort de Queralt, Sarral, Senan, Solivella, Vallclara, Vilaverd and Vimbodí i Poblet.

The vineyards are planted in the valleys of the rivers Francolí and Anguera and are surrounded and protected by mountain ranges: the Serra de Montclar, Codony mountain and Serra de Comalats in the north, the Serra de Miramar and Cogulló in the east, the Serra de Prades in the south, and the Serra del Tallat and Serra de Vilobí in the west.

The land is mainly flat or slightly undulating at heights of between 350 and 600 m above sea level.

== Soils ==
Most of the vines are on dark lime bearing soils, quite loose and poor in organic matter. Towards the foothills of the Sierra de Prades slate can be found in the rock.

== Climate ==
The climate is temperate Mediterranean, with hot summers and cold winters. The average annual temperature is 14 °C with extremes of 35 °C in summer and -6 °C in winter. There is a risk of frost in spring for the vineyards at the highest altitudes. Rainfall is mainly in autumn and the average annual figure is around 500 mm.

The mountain ranges protect the area from the wind, while the high altitude means that the summers are not too hot. Humidity is slightly higher than in neighboring DOP's. The vines receive around 2,500 hours of sunlight per year.

== Authorised Grape Varieties ==
The authorised grape varieties are:

- Red: Trepat, Ull de llebre, Garnatxa Negra, Cabernet Sauvignon, Merlot, Monastrell, Sumoll, and Syrah
- Rosé: Trepat
- White: Xenin, Sumoll Blanc, Parellada, Macabeu, Garnatxa Blanca, Moscatell de Gra Petit, and Chardonnay

The older vines are planted as low bushes (en got), while the more recently planted ones are on trellises (en espatllera) to increase production.

Planting density is around 2–2,500 vines per hectare, though the maximum authorized density is 4,500 vines/ha.

== See also ==
- Catalan wine
- Trepat
