= Maria Tecla Civit Llobera =

Catalan Manager & Healer

Maria Tecla Civit Llobera (Rocafort de Queralt, 18 February 1683 - Valls, 1761) was a Catalan manager and healer, the politically active wife of a Spanish mayor.

== Biography ==
The daughter of Pere Civit i de Llúcia Llobera, Maria Tecla Civit Llobera was 21 years old when she married Pere-Anton Veciana Rabassa (Sarral, 1682 – Valls, 1735) on 7 April 1704 in the parish of Les Piles, where an uncle and godfather of his was a parson. According to the officers of the Order of Santiago half a century later, the Civit de Rocafort family were little lords, and possessed a “a midsized ancestral home with a white stone coat of arms on the front door, featuring a feathered morion at the top, within it a castle and below it two dogs fighting” on Carrer del Forn. Her birthplace can still be found in Rocafort de Queralt, today known as Ca l’Eulàlia, at Carrer Major 7.

Civit could read and write, unlike her husband, a market farmer from a family of market farmers, who was illiterate but would go on to become the mayor of Valls. However, for years, it was Maria Civit who wrote letters for the founder and commander in chief of the Esquadres de Catalunya, the paramilitary precursor to the modern Mossos d’Esquadra. She also helped him in the family's economic management, giving out receipts and keeping the books of the business buying and selling mules. It is also highly possible that Civit taught Veciana to read and write, or at least to sign his name.

Maria Civit was a client of the pharmacist and bookseller Doctor Gassol, who from time to time would rent her one of his two hundred volumes on various topics: the lives of saints, prayer books, tractates on arithmetic and medicine, herbalism and pharmaceutics, books of spells, moral novels, books on history... This auto-didactic cultural education was of great use to Maria and her spouse, both in terms of the economic management of their estate as well as the public image of the military leader of the Mossos. Civit's role as a healer was critical: among the documents of the Veciana family, many notes on remedies can be found in Civit's handwriting, marrying the therapeutic recipes from the tractates she read with popular remedies from oral tradition. During the War of Spanish Succession, his persecution of anti-Bourbon rebel groups and gangs of bandits left the Mayor of Valls badly wounded on several occasions; he was cured by his wife with preparations that she had preserved in writing.

Of the 12 or 13 children the couple had, only four survived. One of her sons was Pere-Màrtir Veciana Civit, the second commander of the Esquadres de Catalunya. Civit experienced several difficult births, leading her to make a will on multiple occasions. She died aged 78, after 25 years of widowhood.
