= Vallbona =

Vallbona may refer to:

- Vallbona d'Anoia, a municipality in Catalonia, Spain
- Vallbona de les Monges, a municipality in Catalonia, Spain
- Vallbona, Barcelona, a district of Barcelona, in Catalonia, Spain
- La Pobla de Vallbona, a municipality in the Valencian Community, Spain
- Tossal Gros de Vallbona, a mountain in Catalonia
