= Tossal Gros de Vallbona =

Highest point
- Elevation: 802 m (2,631 ft)
- Coordinates: 41°28′7.841″N 1°6′46.22″E

Geography
- Location: Conca de Barberà, Urgell; Catalonia
- Parent range: Serra del Tallat

Climbing
- First ascent: Unknown
- Easiest route: Drive from Els Omells de na Gaia or Espluga de Francolí to Senan, then hike

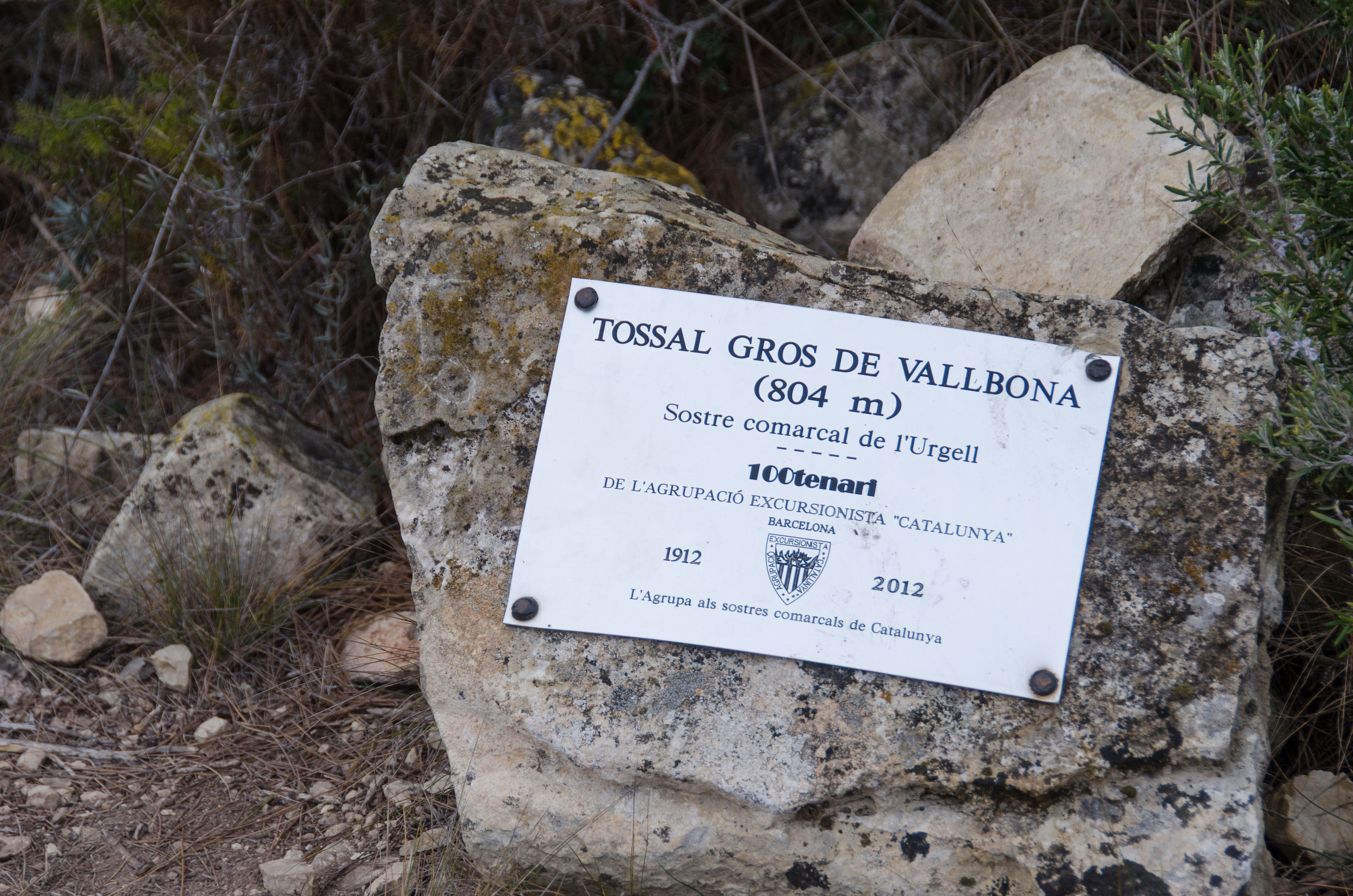
Plaque of the Alt Urgell county roof.

Tossal Gros de Vallbona is a mountain of the Catalan Central Depression, Catalonia, Spain. It has an elevation of 802 metres above sea level.

This mountain is the highest summit of the Serra del Tallat; it is located between the municipal limits of Espluga de Francolí, Conca de Barberà and Vallbona de les Monges, Urgell.

== See also ==
- Catalan Pre-Coastal Range
- Mountains of Catalonia
