= Sarral =

Sarral can refer to:

- Sarral, Haripur, a village in Haripur district, Pakistan
- Sarral, Tarragona, a village in Catalonia, Spain
