= El Fonoll =

Naturist village in Catalonia, Spain

Coordinates: 41.5288°N 1.2315°E

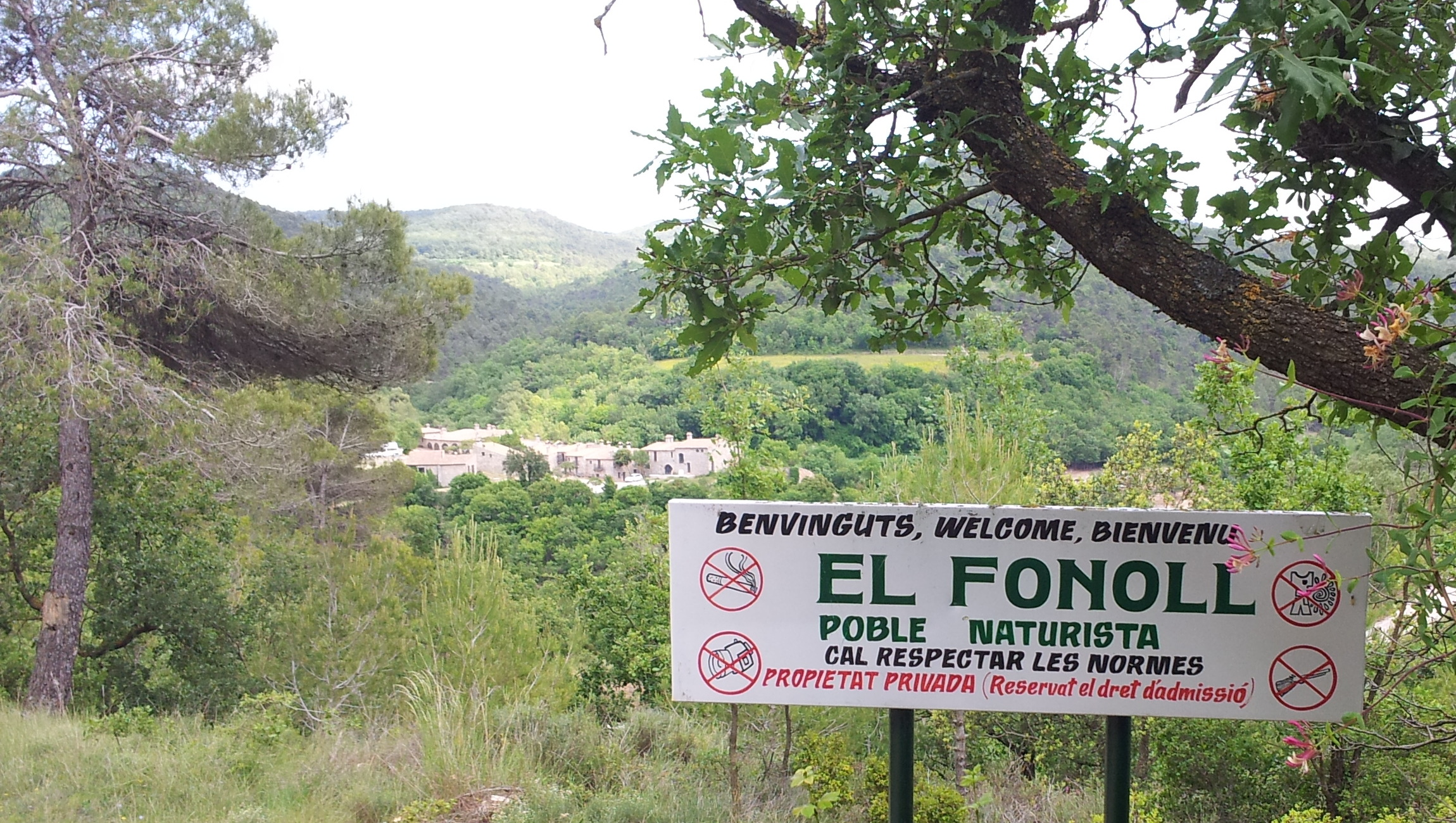
El Fonoll village and valley, from the west

Location in Catalonia

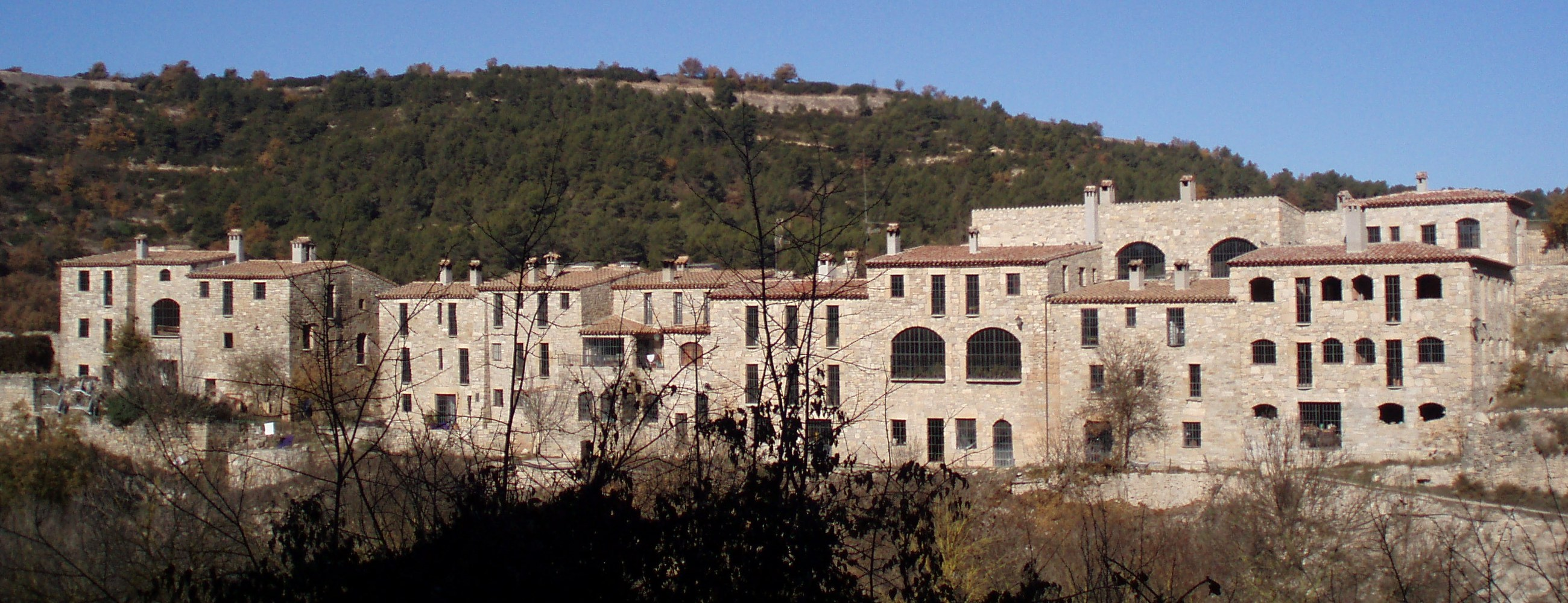
Buildings at El Fonoll facing south along the valley towards Forès

El Fonoll ("the fennel" in Catalan) is a naturist village in Catalonia, Spain, situated in the inland comarca of Conca de Barberà. The village is ancient, and had fallen into ruins before being restored and turned into a naturist resort around the year 2000.

== History ==
El Fonoll has been mentioned in writings going back as far as 1305. The village originally contained a castle, of which no trace remains, and a small church dedicated to St. Blaise, built between the 10th and 12th centuries, which contains some unique architectural features and has remained in good condition.

The village fell into disuse, and its buildings into ruins, during the 20th century, and the entire area, including over 150 hectares of surrounding land, was eventually bought by Barcelona businessman Emili Vives in 1995, with the intention of restoring it and turning it into a naturist centre. During the construction, Vives met with much obstruction from local and regional officials, but persisted with the project and succeeded in rebuilding almost all of the buildings, using the original limestone blocks.

== The village today ==
El Fonoll is situated in an isolated forested river valley cutting through the surrounding grain-farming plateau region, and there is an extensive network of tracks winding through the adjoining forested hillsides and abandoned fields and terraces. It is connected by road to the village of Passanant and by track to Vallfogona de Riucorb, both about 5 km away. The village has no access restrictions for people passing through, but there are signs at the boundaries of the lands asking visitors to remove their clothes if possible and not to smoke or use cameras. The village sources much of its food from its own organic plots, and generates its own electricity using wind turbines and solar panels.

Accommodation is provided for about 200 people, both long-term residents and holiday visitors. Options include a camping and caravan area, apartments in the restored buildings, and several isolated stone cabins scattered throughout the lands. The Catalan Naturism Club has the use of a building in the village for its activities and accommodation.

Facilities available to residents and guests include a shop, a vegetarian cafeteria, a library, a swimming pool, sports pitches, picnic and barbecue areas, and regular organised activities such as sports, entertainment, and courses and conferences related to alternative living. The communally prepared Sunday paellas are especially popular. The facilities operate all year around, but vary with the seasons, to include traditional seasonal activities such as calçotades (springtime scallion feasts) and castanyades (autumn chestnut feasts). Due to the village's inland location and altitude at about 650m its winters are cool, so it attracts smaller numbers of visitors, mainly clothed, outside of the summer season.

== See also ==
- List of social nudity places in Europe
