= Batista (footballer, born 1979) =

Brazilian footballer

Personal information
- Full name: José Batista Leite da Silva
- Date of birth: 12 July 1979 (age 47)
- Place of birth: Anguera, Brazil
- Height: 1.73 m (5 ft 8 in)
- Position: Midfielder

Youth career
- 1995–1997: Galo Maringá

Senior career*
Years	Team	Apps	(Gls)
1998–2000	Galo Maringá		
2001–2002	Palmeiras Nordeste		
2003	Mogi Mirim		
2004	Catuense		
2005–2006	Galo Maringá		
2006	Paraná		
2007–2011	Avaí	27	(2)
2007	→ Paraná (loan)	16	(1)
2009	→ Botafogo (loan)	19	(2)
2012	Oeste		
2013–?	Operário		
- * Club domestic league appearances and goals

José Batista Leite da Silva (born 12 July 1979), or simply Batista, is a Brazilian former footballer who played as a midfielder.
