= Joan Agulló =

Personal details
- Born: Lleida, Catalonia
- Died: 1462 Tàrrega, Catalonia
- Occupation: Revolutionary
- Profession: Military

Joan Agulló (15th century) was a Spanish nobleman from Catalonia, Army officer and Syndic of Lleida between 1446 and 1460. He led a rebellion against King John II of Aragon and Navarra.

== Biography ==
Joan Agulló was born in the fifteenth century, son of Bernat Agulló (nephew of Guillem d'Agulló),

During the Catalan Civil War 1462–1472, the Captain Agulló, was one of the militia leaders who rebelled against King John II. In command of 800 men with the intention of strengthening the rebels Agulló, headed to the region of Pla d'Urgell way to Lleida, where they were surprised by forces loyal to King in Castelldans. The King John II forgive all men, except the Captain Joan Agulló who had been imprisoned. In 1462 Agulló was tortured and executed for treason in the city Tàrrega. Catalonia.
