= Serra del Tallat =

- Location within Catalonia

Highest point
- Elevation: 802 m (2,631 ft)
- Coordinates: 41°28′07″N 01°06′46″E

Geography
- Location: Conca de Barberà, Urgell; Catalonia
- Parent range: Catalan Central Depression

Climbing
- First ascent: Unknown
- Easiest route: Drive from Els Omells de na Gaia or Espluga de Francolí to Senan, then hike

Serra del Tallat is a mountain range of the Catalan Central Depression, Catalonia, Spain. It has an elevation of 802 metres above sea level.

The highest summit of the Serra del Tallat is the Tossal Gros de Vallbona; it is located between the municipal limits of Espluga de Francolí, Conca de Barberà and Vallbona de les Monges, Urgell.

== See also ==
- Catalan Central Depression
- Mountains of Catalonia
