= Blancafort =

Blancafort may refer to:

- Blancafort, Cher, a commune in the Cher department in the Centre-Val de Loire region of France.
- Blancafort, Tarragona, a municipality in the province of Tarragona and the autonomous community of Catalonia, Spain.
