= Bernat Agulló =

Catalan nobleman

- Born: 15th-century Principality of Catalonia (Crown of Aragon)
- Died: 15th-century Principality of Catalonia (Crown of Aragon)

Bernat Agulló (14-14?) a Catalan noblemen, was Paer en cap (mayor) of Lleida, during the Crown of Aragon.

== Biography ==
Born in Catalonia, Bernat was the nephew of Guillem d'Agulló, and father of Joan Agulló. Bernat Agulló exercised governmental functions, both in the town of Barcelona as in Valencia.
