= Savallà del Comtat =

- Municipality
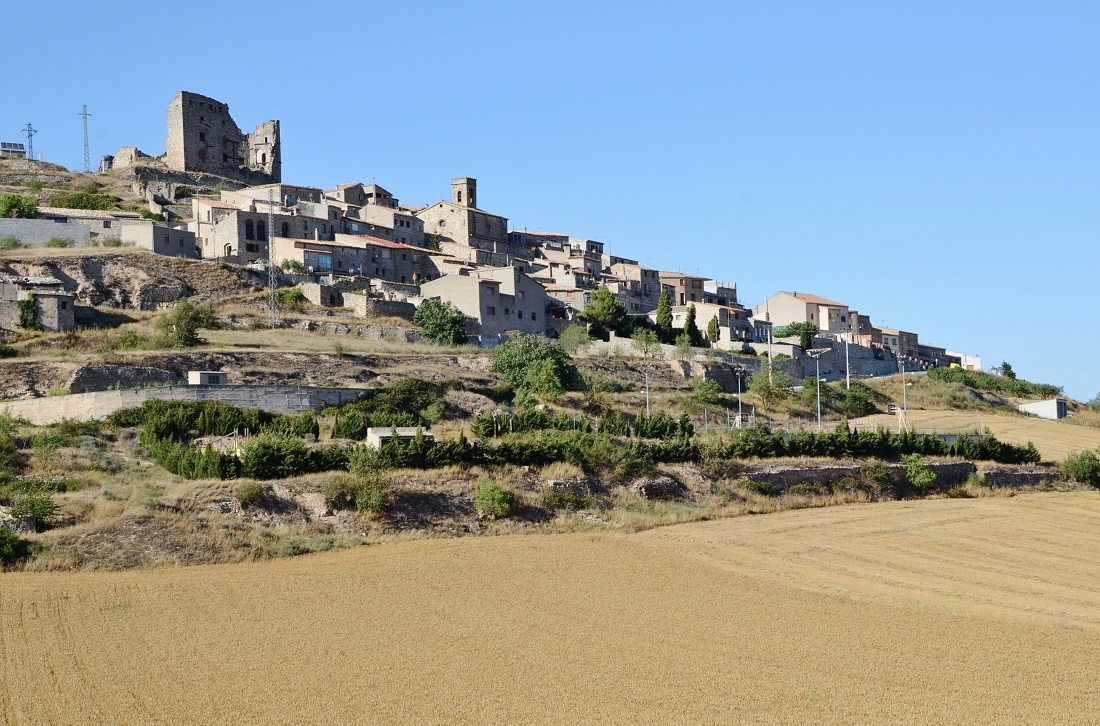

- Flag Coat of arms

- Location in Catalonia
- Coordinates: 41.545°N 1.3011°E
- Country: Spain
- Autonomous community: Catalonia
- Province: Tarragona
- Comarca: Conca de Barberà

Government
  - Mayor: Joan Altimís Santacana (2015)

Area
  - Total: 14.8 km^{2} (5.7 sq mi)

Population (2025-01-01)
  - Total: 49
  - Density: 3.3/km^{2} (8.6/sq mi)
- Time zone: UTC+1 (CET)
  - Summer (DST): UTC+2 (CEST)
- Website: www.savalla.altanet.org

Savallà del Comtat (Catalan pronunciation: [səβəˈʎa ðəl kumˈtat]) is a municipality and village in the comarca of Conca de Barberà in the province of Tarragona in Catalonia, Spain. It has a population of 49 (register office, 2025).
