= Guillem d'Agulló =

Spanish nobleman (1310s–1393)

- Abbot of Poblet
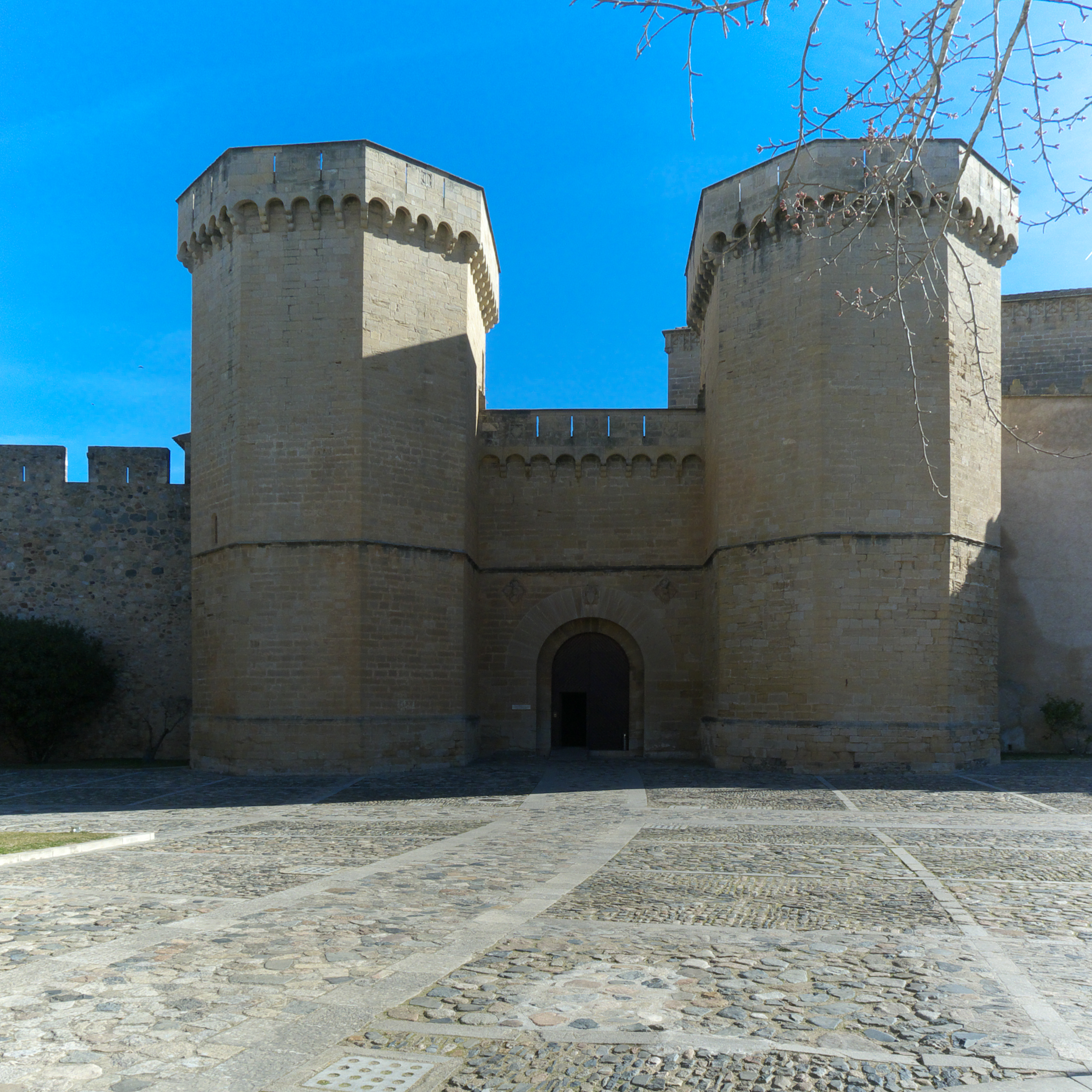
- Monastery of Poblet
- Born: 1310s Catalonia, Crown of Aragon
- Died: 1393; Poblet, Conca de Barberà, Province of Tarragona

Guillem d'Agulló (1310s-1393) was a Spanish nobleman and Abbot of Poblet. He was commissioned by Peter IV for reforms, building projects and construction of royal tombs in the Monastery of Poblet.

== Biography ==
Born in Catalonia, d'Agulló was appointed Abbot of Poblet by Peter of Aragon. D'Agulló built fortified towers, and other defensive elements of the abbey.
