= Solivella =

- Municipality
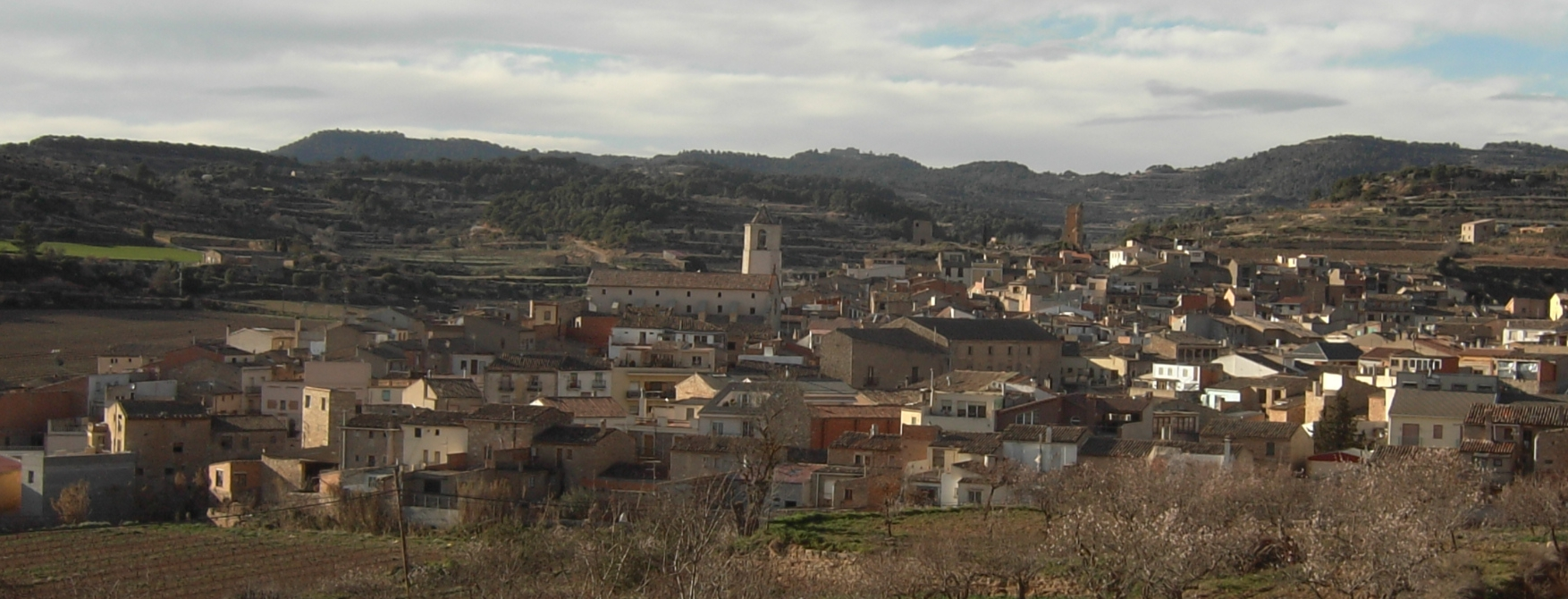

- Flag Coat of arms

- Location in Catalonia
- Coordinates: 41°27′33″N 1°10′43″E
- Country: Spain
- Community: Catalonia
- Province: Tarragona
- Comarca: Conca de Barberà

Government
  - Mayor: Enric Capdevila Torres (2015)

Area
  - Total: 21.4 km^{2} (8.3 sq mi)
- Elevation: 489 m (1,604 ft)

Population (2025-01-01)
  - Total: 633
  - Density: 29.6/km^{2} (76.6/sq mi)
- Demonym: Solivellenc
- Postal code: 43412
- Website: www.solivella.cat

Solivella (Catalan pronunciation: [suliˈveʎa]) is a municipality in the comarca of the Conca de Barberà in Catalonia, Spain. It has a population of 633 (register office, 2025).

Mentioned for the first time in a document from 1058, it developed around a castle, the ruins of which still remain today. It was a possession of the Monastery of Santes Creus, and in 1393, it became part of the Catalan crown.

The medieval Sanctuary of Tallat is located nearby, between Solivella and Belltall.

== Bibliography ==
- Panareda Clopés, Josep Maria; Rios Calvet, Jaume; Rabella Vives, Josep Maria (1989). Guia de Catalunya, Barcelona: Caixa de Catalunya. ISBN 84-87135-01-3 (Spanish). ISBN 84-87135-02-1 (Catalan).
