= Rocallaura =

- Decentralized municipal entity
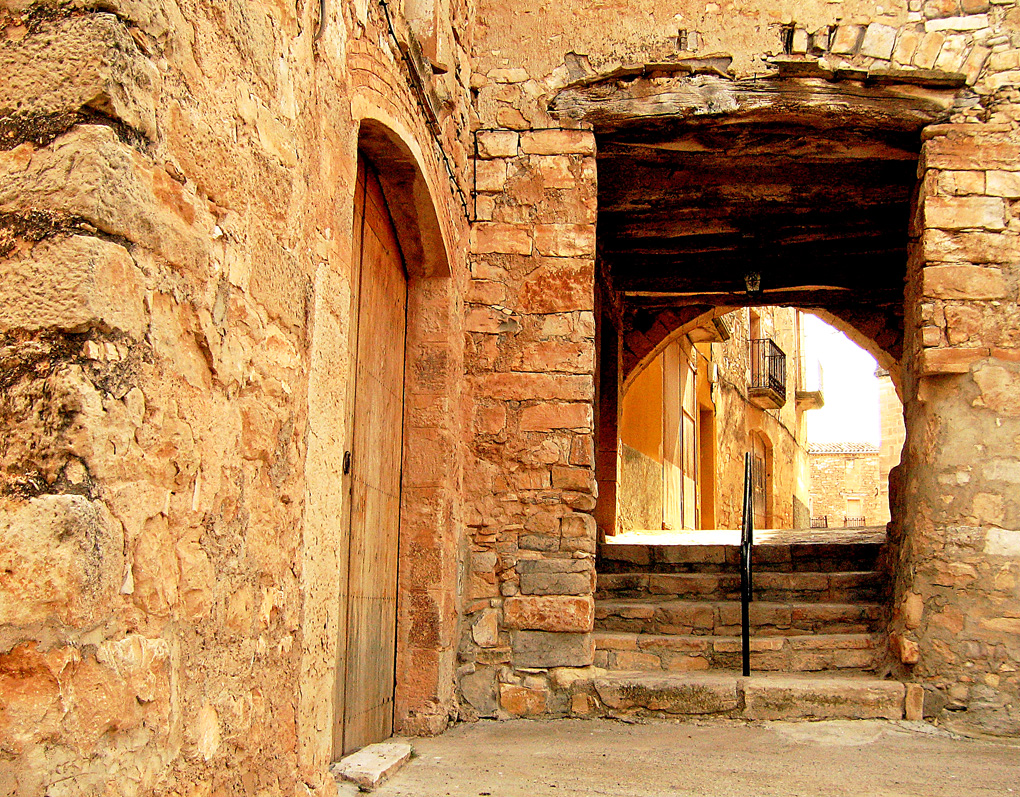

- Location within Province of Lleida Location within Catalonia Location within Spain
- Coordinates: 41°30′26″N 1°8′53″E
- Country: Spain
- Community: Catalonia
- Province: Lleida
- Municipality: Vallbona de les Monges
- Elevation: 647 m (2,123 ft)

Population
  - Total: 79

Rocallaura is a locality and decentralized municipal entity located in the municipality of Vallbona de les Monges, in Province of Lleida province, Catalonia, Spain. As of 2020, it has a population of 79.

== Geography ==
Rocallaura is located 67km east-southeast of Lleida.
