= Vallclara =

- Municipality
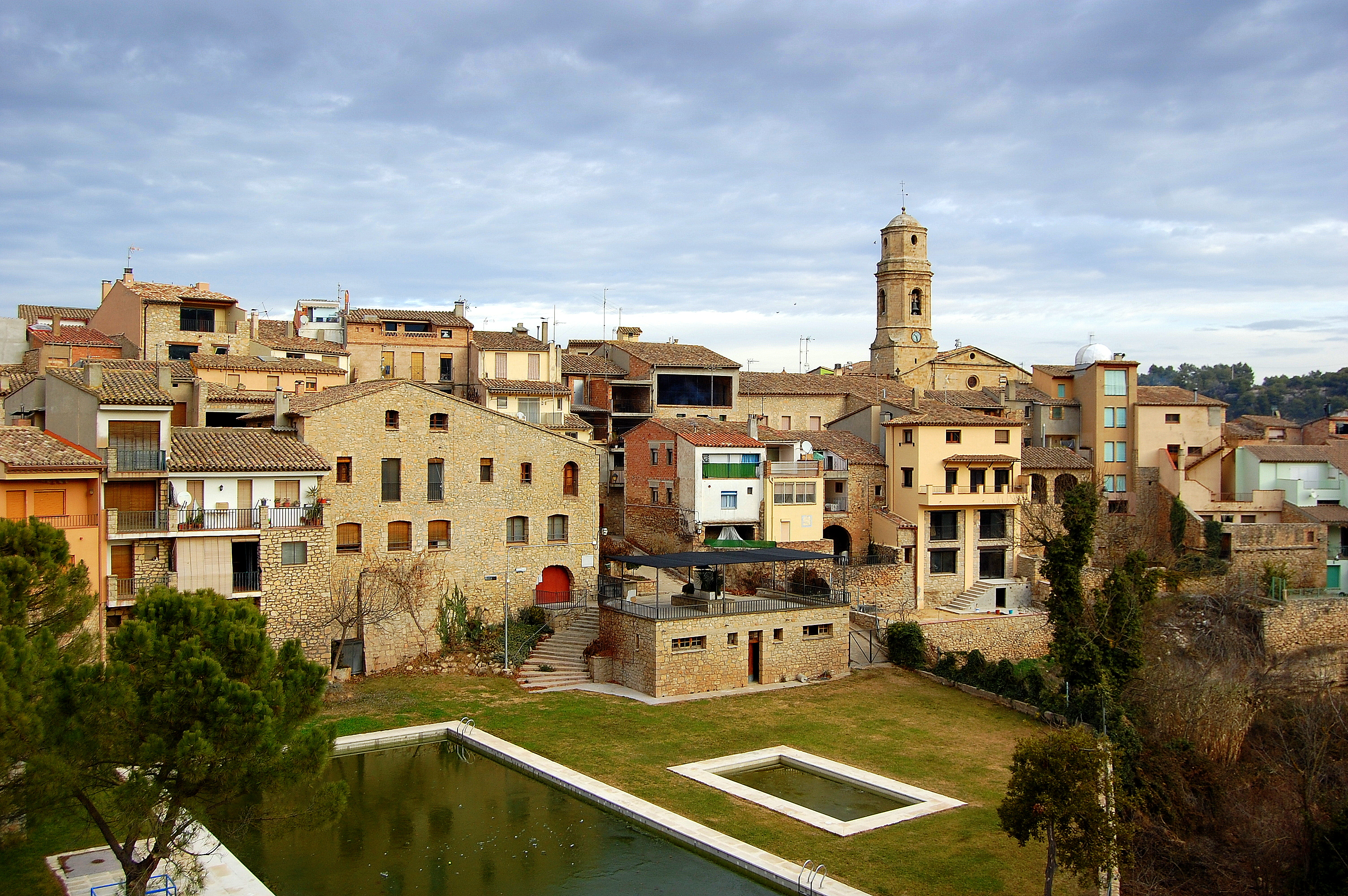

- Flag Coat of arms

- Location in Catalonia
- Coordinates: 41.383°N 0.9833°E
- Country: Spain
- Autonomous community: Catalonia
- Province: Tarragona
- Comarca: Conca de Barberà

Government
  - Mayor: Rosendo Roig Nadal (2015)

Area
  - Total: 13.6 km^{2} (5.3 sq mi)

Population (2025-01-01)
  - Total: 91
  - Density: 6.7/km^{2} (17/sq mi)
- Time zone: UTC+1 (CET)
  - Summer (DST): UTC+2 (CEST)
- Website: www.vallclara.altanet.org

Vallclara (Catalan pronunciation: [ˌbaʎˈklaɾə]) is a village in the province of Tarragona and autonomous community of Catalonia, Spain. It has a population of 91 (register office, 2025). The town is 600 meters above sea level, it is developed around the old castle and extends along the road from Vimbodí to Vilanova de Prades.
