= Trepat =

Variety of grape

Trepat is a red Catalan wine grape variety that is grown primarily in the Conca de Barberà and Costers del Segre Denominación de Origen (DO)s of Catalonia. Ampelographers believe that the grape is likely indigenous to Northeastern Iberian Peninsula. Today there are approximately 1,500 hectares (3,700 acres) of the variety, used mostly for light rosé.

== Wine regions ==
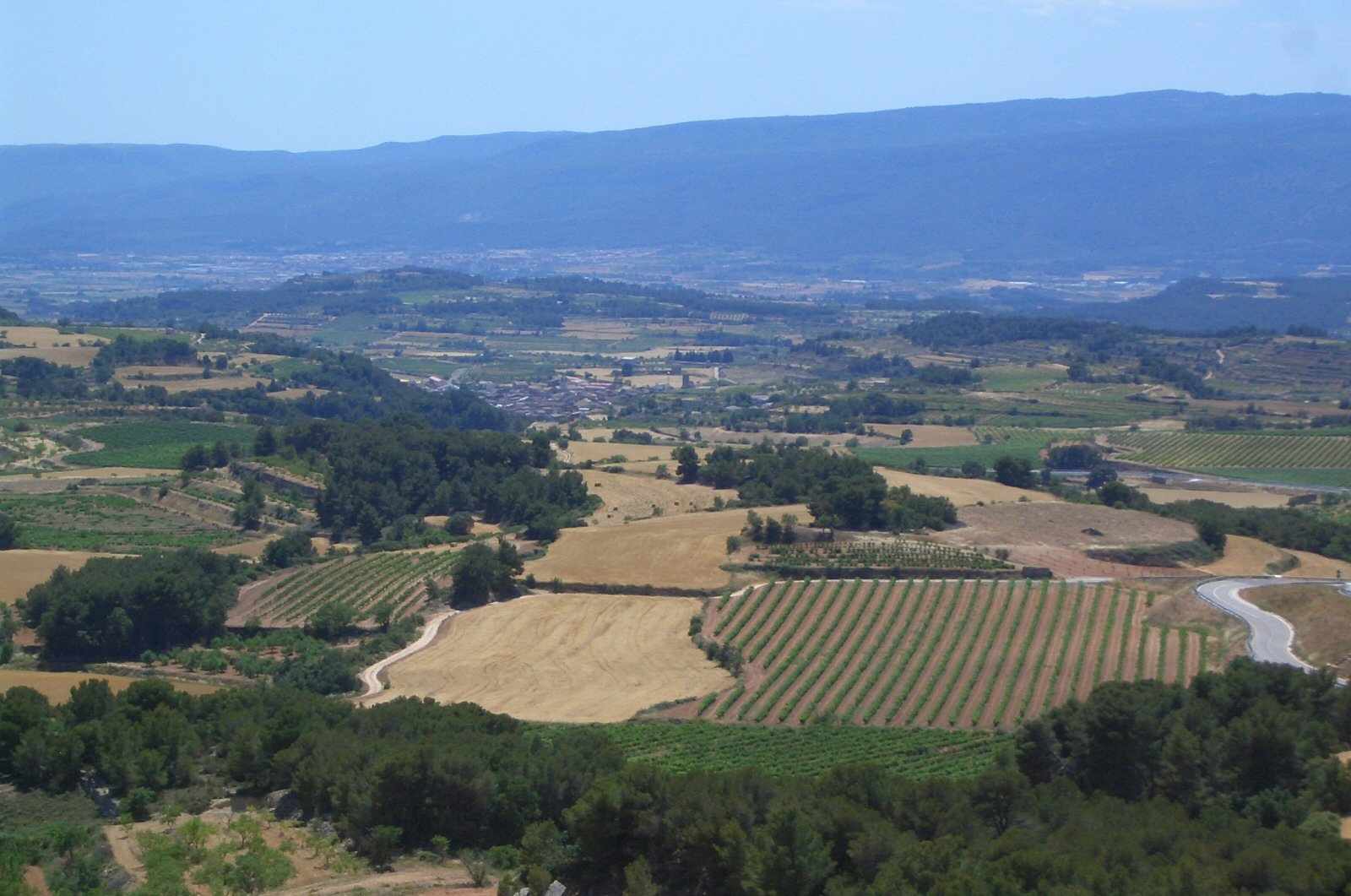
The Conca de Barberà DO is one of the main wine regions in Spain that grows Trepat.

In Catalonia, Trepat is mainly found in the blended rosé wines of Conca de Barberà and Costers del Segre where it is often blended with other varieties. In Conca de Barberà these varieties are permitted to be Grenache, Pinot noir, Tempranillo and Cabernet Sauvignon while in Costers del Segre Trepat is blended with Carignan, Merlot, Mourvedre, Cabernet Sauvignon, Grenache and Tempranillo.

== Synonyms ==
Over the years Trepat has been known under a variety of synonyms including: Bonicaire, Embolicaire, Parrel, Trapat, Traput and Trepan.
