= Montblanquet =

- Locality
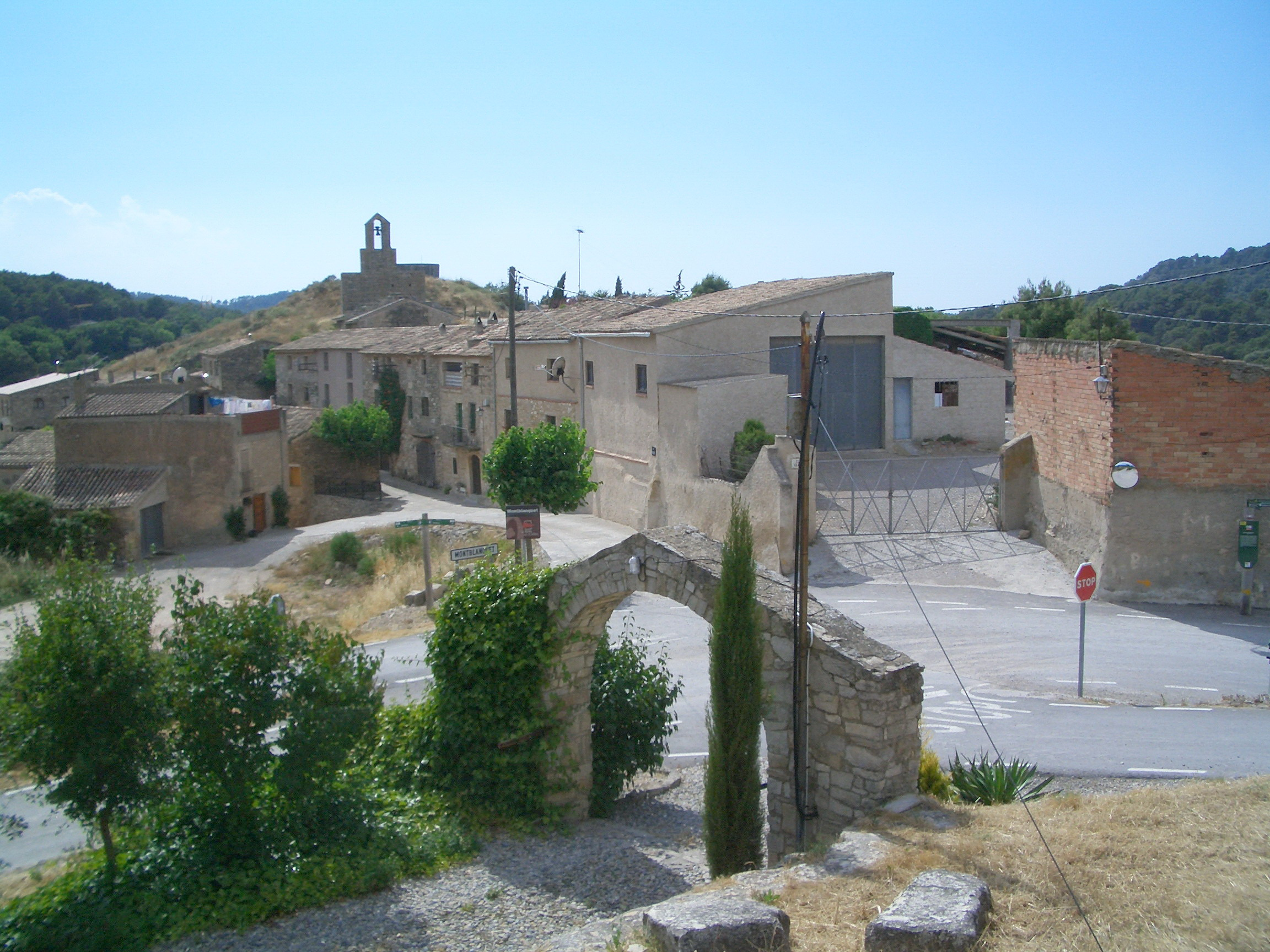

- Location within Province of Lleida Location within Catalonia Location within Spain
- Coordinates: 41°29′37″N 1°6′48″E
- Country: Spain
- Community: Catalonia
- Province: Lleida
- Municipality: Vallbona de les Monges
- Elevation: 633 m (2,077 ft)

Population
  - Total: 9

Montblanquet is a locality located in the municipality of Vallbona de les Monges, in Province of Lleida province, Catalonia, Spain. As of 2020, it has a population of 9.

== Geography ==
Montblanquet is located 66km east-southeast of Lleida.
