= Les Piles =

- Municipality
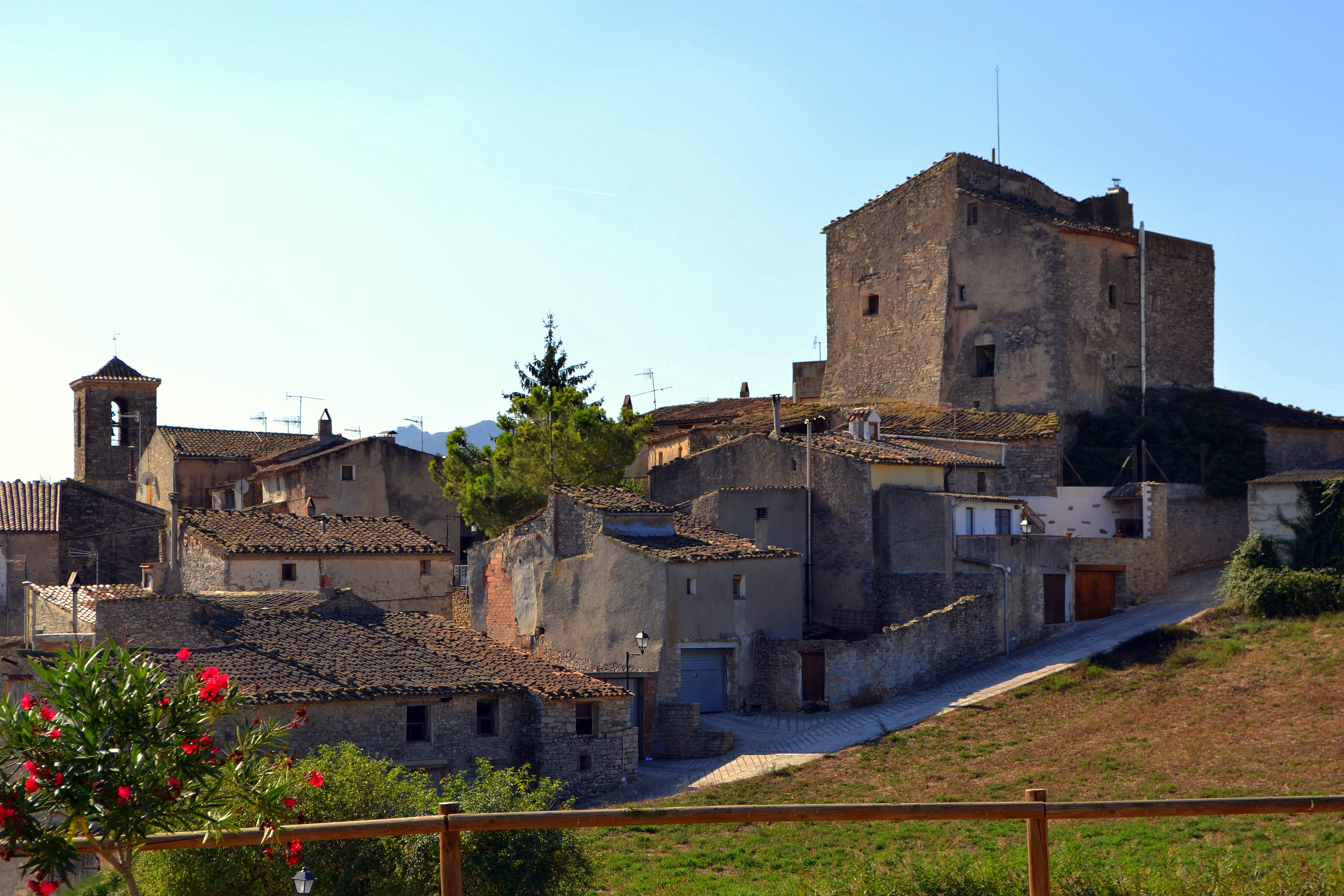

- Flag Coat of arms

- Location in Catalonia
- Coordinates: 41.506°N 1.3439°E
- Country: Spain
- Autonomous community: Catalonia
- Province: Tarragona
- Comarca: Conca de Barberà

Government
  - Mayor: Magí Balcells Gasol (2015)

Area
  - Total: 22.4 km^{2} (8.6 sq mi)

Population (2025-01-01)
  - Total: 229
  - Density: 10.2/km^{2} (26.5/sq mi)
- Time zone: UTC+1 (CET)
  - Summer (DST): UTC+2 (CEST)
- Website: www.lespiles.cat

Les Piles (Catalan pronunciation: [les ˈpiles]) is a village in the province of Tarragona and autonomous community of Catalonia, Spain. It has a population of 229 (register office, 2025).

== History ==
The town was conquered from the Moors in the late 10th century. It grew up around its castle, which now has many additions and renovations. Bernat de Boixadors is documented as Lord of Les Piles in 1379. According to a census from that year, Les Piles was home to nineteen families. A year later, Bernat de Boixadors buys the high and low lordship from Infante John (1380). In the 1496 census, the population had decreased to sixteen families.

During the modern era, Les Piles belonged to the Counts of Savallà, who held possession until the extinction of the baronial domains. In the mid-19th century, Les Piles formed a municipality together with Biure de Gaià.
