= Conesa, Spain =

Conesa
- Municipality
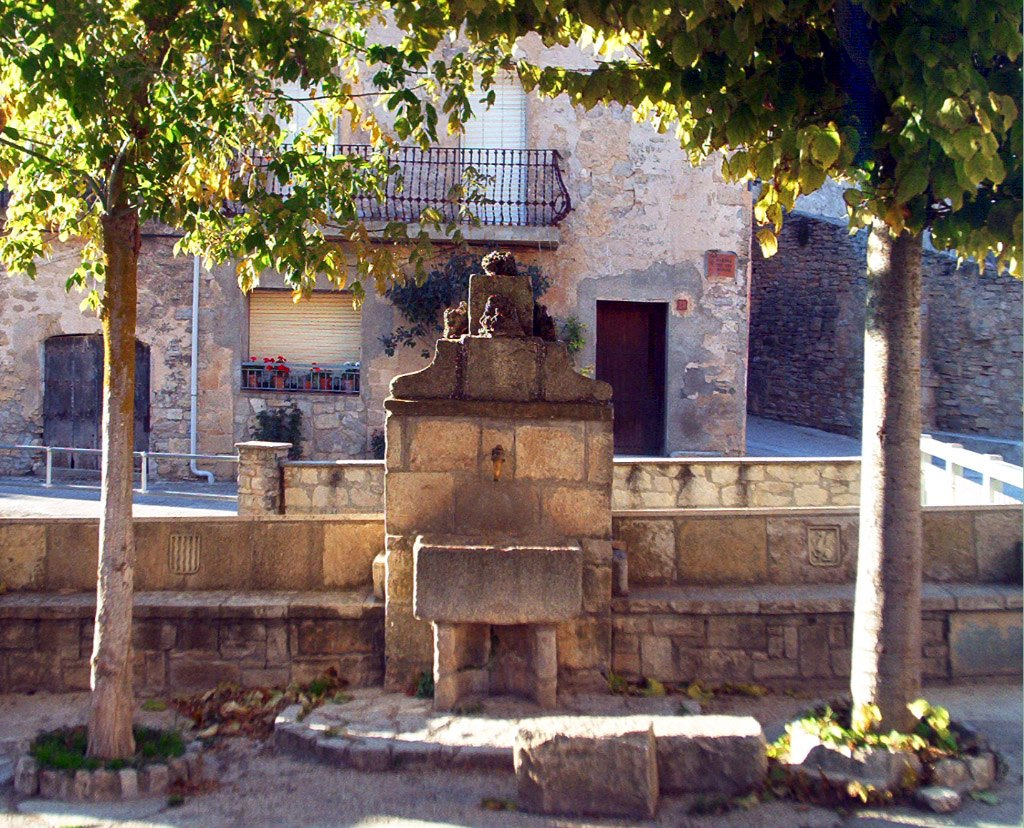

- Flag Coat of arms

- Location in Catalonia
- Coordinates: 41.5187°N 1.2915°E
- Country: ESP
- Autonomous community: Catalonia
- Province: Tarragona
- Comarca: Conca de Barberà

Government
  - Mayor: Judit Trepat Ampurdanés (2015)

Area
  - Total: 29.0 km^{2} (11.2 sq mi)

Population (2025-01-01)
  - Total: 111
  - Density: 3.83/km^{2} (9.91/sq mi)
- Time zone: UTC+1 (CET)
  - Summer (DST): UTC+2 (CEST)
- Postal code: 43427
- Website: www.conesa.altanet.org

Conesa (Catalan pronunciation: [kuˈnɛzə]) is a municipality and village in the comarca of Conca de Barberà in the province of Tarragona in Catalonia, Spain. It has a population of 111 (register office, 2025).
