= Passanant i Belltall =

- Municipality
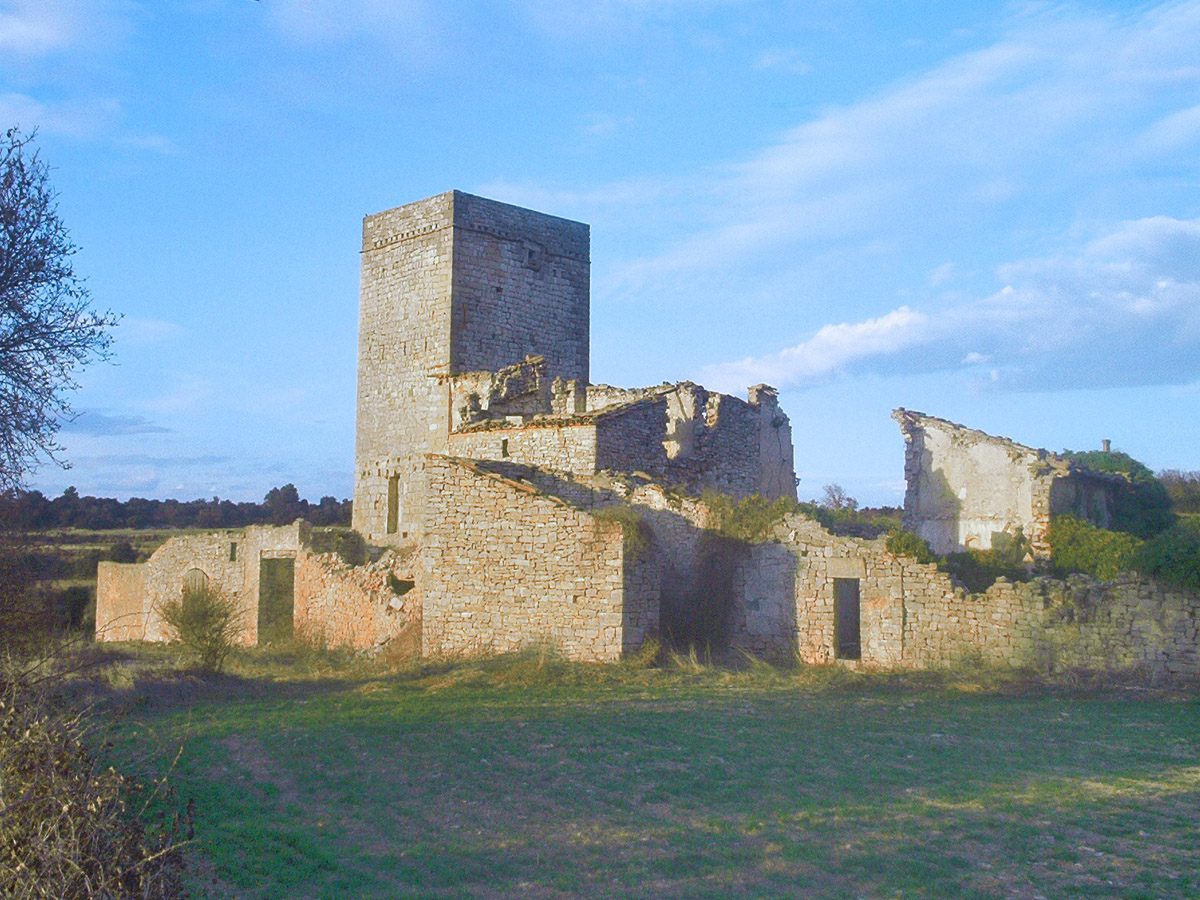
- La Sala de Comalats village

- Flag Coat of arms

- Location in Catalonia
- Coordinates: 41°32′1″N 1°11′53″E
- Country: Spain
- Community: Catalonia
- Province: Tarragona
- Comarca: Conca de Barberà

Government
  - Mayor: Maria Carmen Amenós Fabregat (2015)

Area
  - Total: 27.4 km^{2} (10.6 sq mi)
- Elevation: 714 m (2,343 ft)

Population (2025-01-01)
  - Total: 149
  - Density: 5.44/km^{2} (14.1/sq mi)
- Demonym: Passanantí
- Postal code: 43101
- Website: www.passanantibelltall.cat

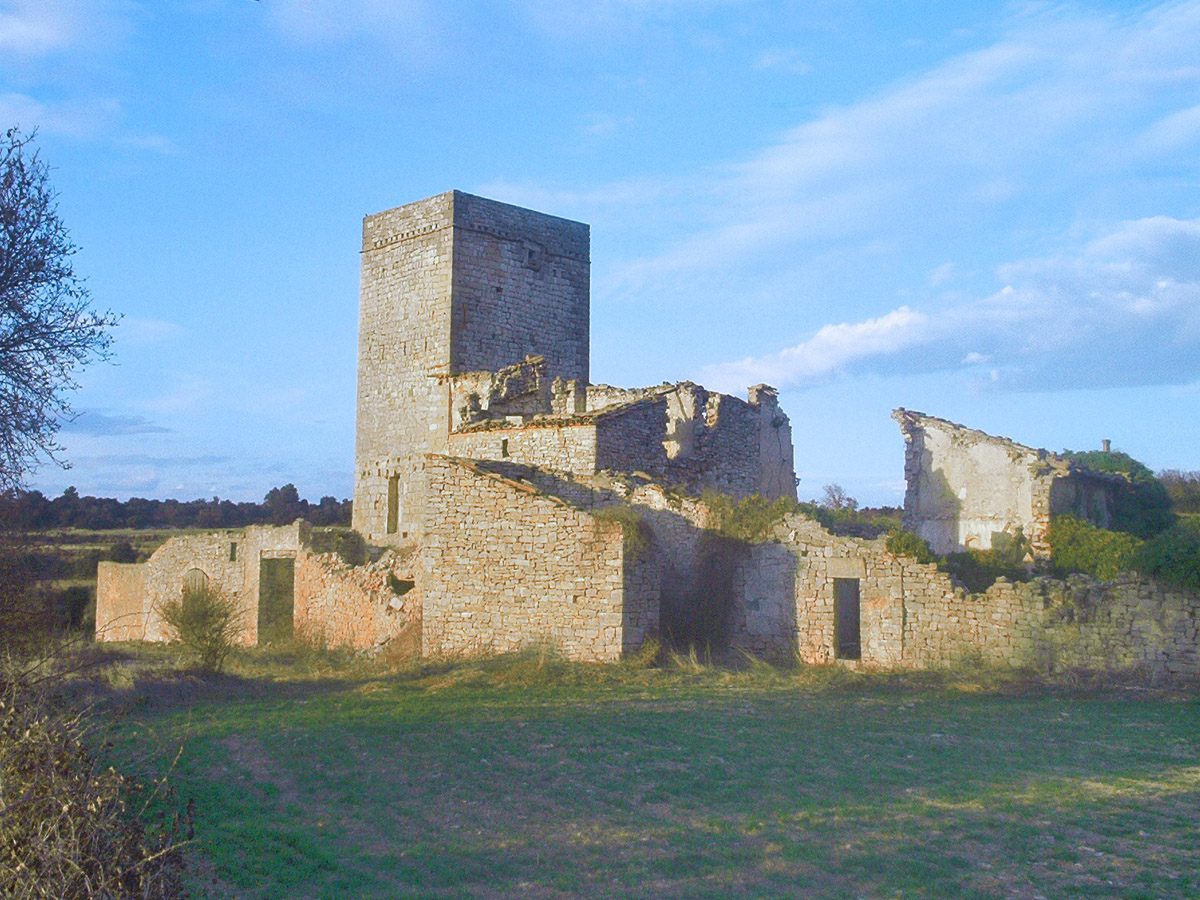
The castle at La Sala de Comalats, a small settlement in the municipality

Passanant i Belltall (Catalan pronunciation: [pəsəˈnan i ˌbeʎˈtaʎ]) is a municipality in the comarca of the Conca de Barberà in Catalonia, Spain.

It includes the settlements of Passanant, Belltall, Glorieta, La Sala de Comalats, La Pobla de Ferran and El Fonoll. In total it has a population of 149 (register office, 2025).

The municipality was known as Passanant until 2005 when it was changed because although the town hall remains in Passanant, the village of Belltall is also of importance.

== History ==
The municipality is already mentioned in documents from 1079. It belonged to the Counts of Cervera until 1261, when it was ceded to the Order of Hospitallers, who controlled the place until the end of the Lordships. In Passanant there was a castle, probably from the 15th century, of which no trace remains.

== Bibliography ==
- Panareda Clopés, Josep Maria; Rios Calvet, Jaume; Rabella Vives, Josep Maria (1989). Guia de Catalunya, Barcelona: Caixa de Catalunya. ISBN 84-87135-01-3 (Spanish). ISBN 84-87135-02-1 (Catalan).
