= Sarral, Haripur =

Sarral (Urdu and Gojri سرل) is a village in Haripur District in Khyber-Pakhtunkhwa province of Pakistan with a population of about 2163. It is located east of the district Haripur at 33° 52' 60N 73° 1' 60E. It is located on the right bank of Haro stream. Its mountains are covered with Pine and Myrobalan آملہ trees and rich of wildlife.

This Village is Located among the mountain and opposite of Muree. This Village is connected with Chhajjian Village Via Way and residence of this Village have to Travel approximately 5-6 km to get the Transport. So the life of people is very hard when they have to carry their patients on their shoulder . Till to now here is only one primary school for both boys and Girls and not any arrangement of medical facility.
