= Vilaverd =

- Municipality
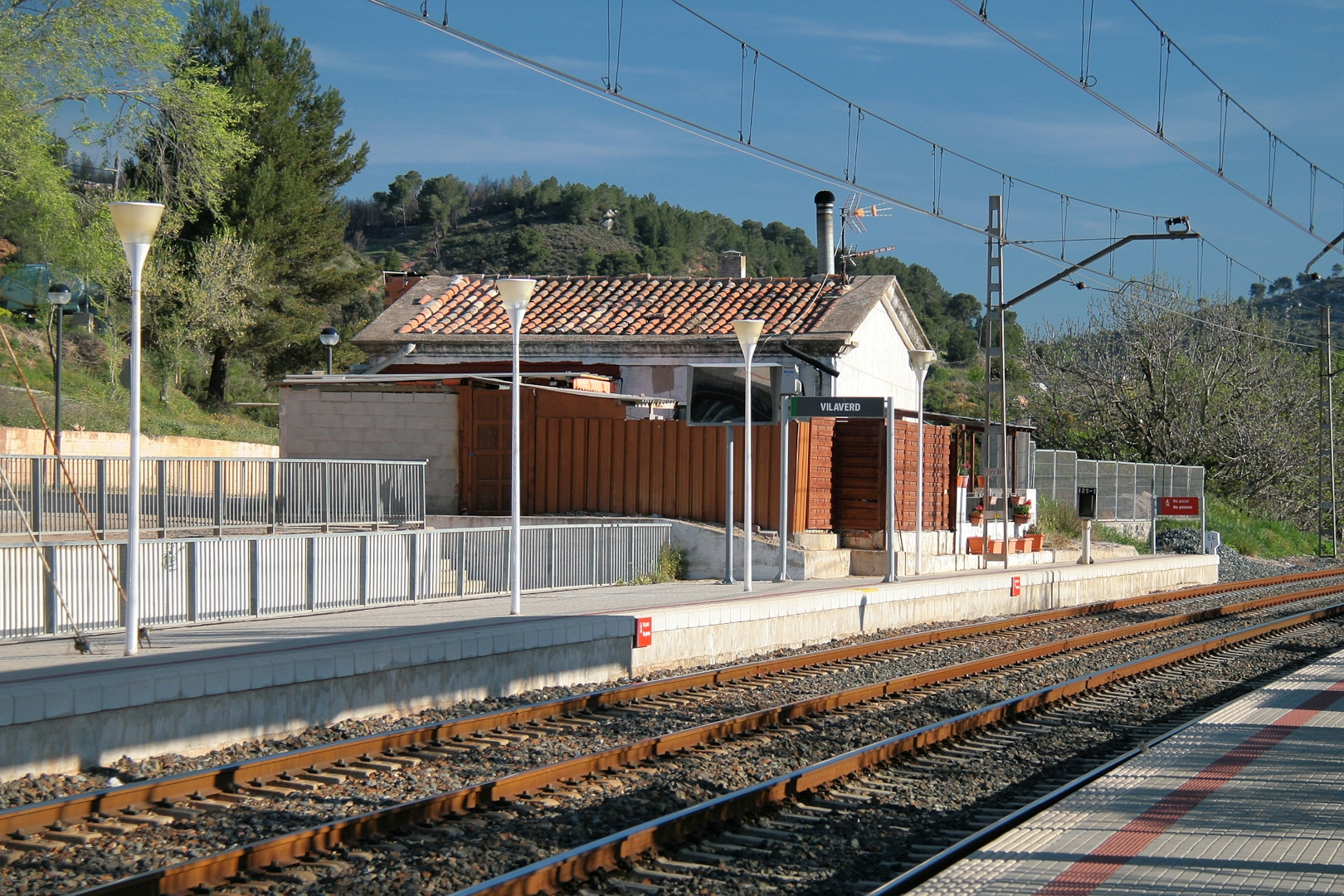
- Vilaverd train station

- Coat of arms

- Location in Catalonia
- Coordinates: 41°20′12″N 1°10′43″E
- Country: Spain
- Community: Catalonia
- Province: Tarragona
- Comarca: Conca de Barberà

Government
  - mayor: Antoni Anglés Rosich

Area
  - Total: 12.6 km^{2} (4.9 sq mi)
- Elevation: 269 m (883 ft)

Population (2025-01-01)
  - Total: 493
  - Density: 39.1/km^{2} (101/sq mi)
- Demonym: Vilabertí
- Postal code: 34172
- Website: www.vilaverd.altanet.org

Vilaverd (Catalan pronunciation: [viləˈvɛɾt]) is a municipality in the comarca of the Conca de Barberà in Catalonia, Spain.

It has a population of 493 (register office, 2025).

The Prades Mountains are located in the vicinity of this municipality.

== Bibliography ==
- Panareda Clopés, Josep Maria; Rios Calvet, Jaume; Rabella Vives, Josep Maria (1989). Guia de Catalunya, Barcelona: Caixa de Catalunya. ISBN 84-87135-01-3 (Spanish). ISBN 84-87135-02-1 (Catalan).
