= Els Omells de na Gaia =

- Municipality
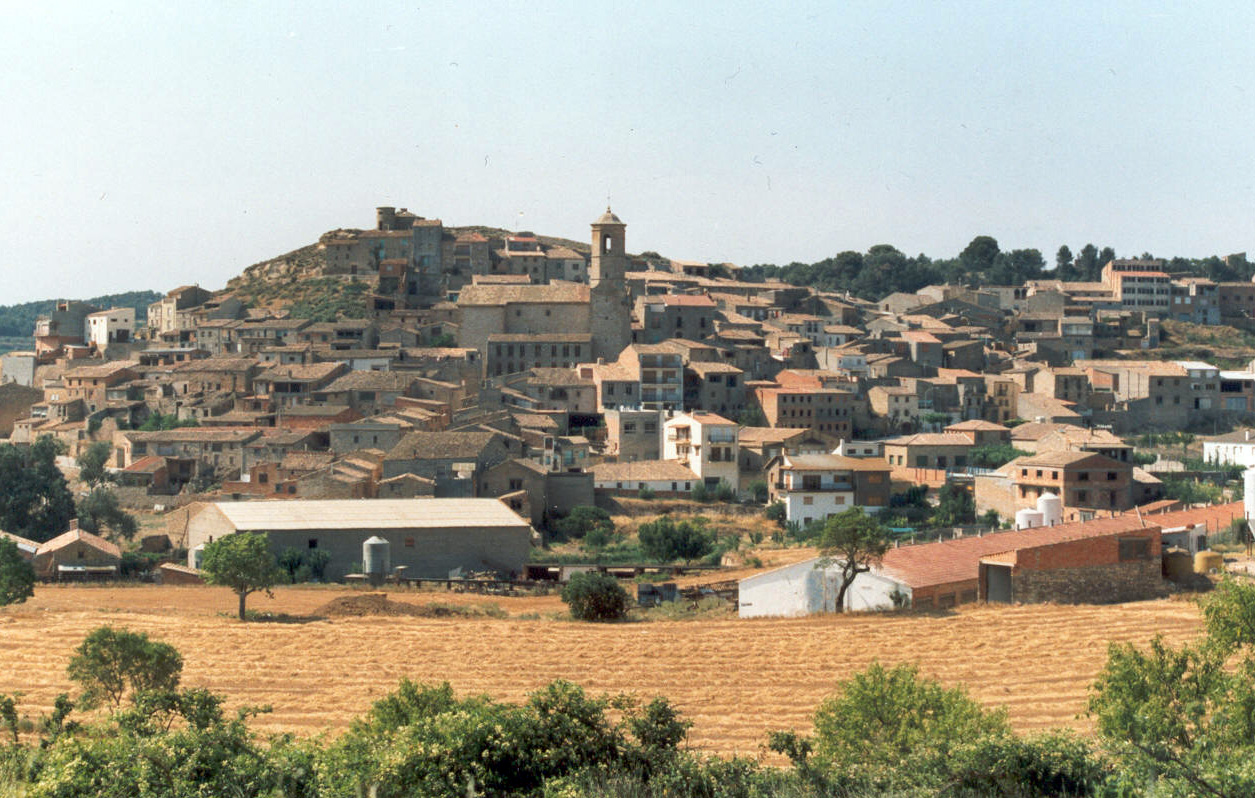

- Flag Coat of arms

- Location in Catalonia
- Coordinates: 41°30′08″N 1°04′37″E
- Country: Spain
- Community: Catalonia
- Province: Lleida
- Comarca: Urgell

Government
  - mayor: Delfi Escoté Salla (2015)

Area
  - Total: 13.5 km^{2} (5.2 sq mi)
- Elevation: 560 m (1,840 ft)

Population (2025-01-01)
  - Total: 126
  - Density: 9.33/km^{2} (24.2/sq mi)
- Demonym(s): Omellenc, omellenca
- Postal code: 25154
- Website: omellsdenagaia.cat

Els Omells de na Gaia (Catalan pronunciation: [elz oˈmeʎz ðe na ˈɣaja]) is a municipality in the comarca of the Urgell in Catalonia, Spain. It is located north of the Serra del Tallat, Catalan Pre-Coastal Range, at the southern end of the comarca.

The town centre has medieval stone houses. The Església parroquial de Santa Maria is an 18th-century church that houses some ancient carved wood images. Els Omells de na Gaia is in an economically depressed area, the main income is derived from cereal, vineyard and almond cultivation, as well as some cattle.

== Demography ==
It has a population of 126 (register office, 2025).

1900	1930	1950	1970	1986	2006
641	624	481	276	n/a	159
