= Blancafort, Spain =

Blancafort
- Municipality
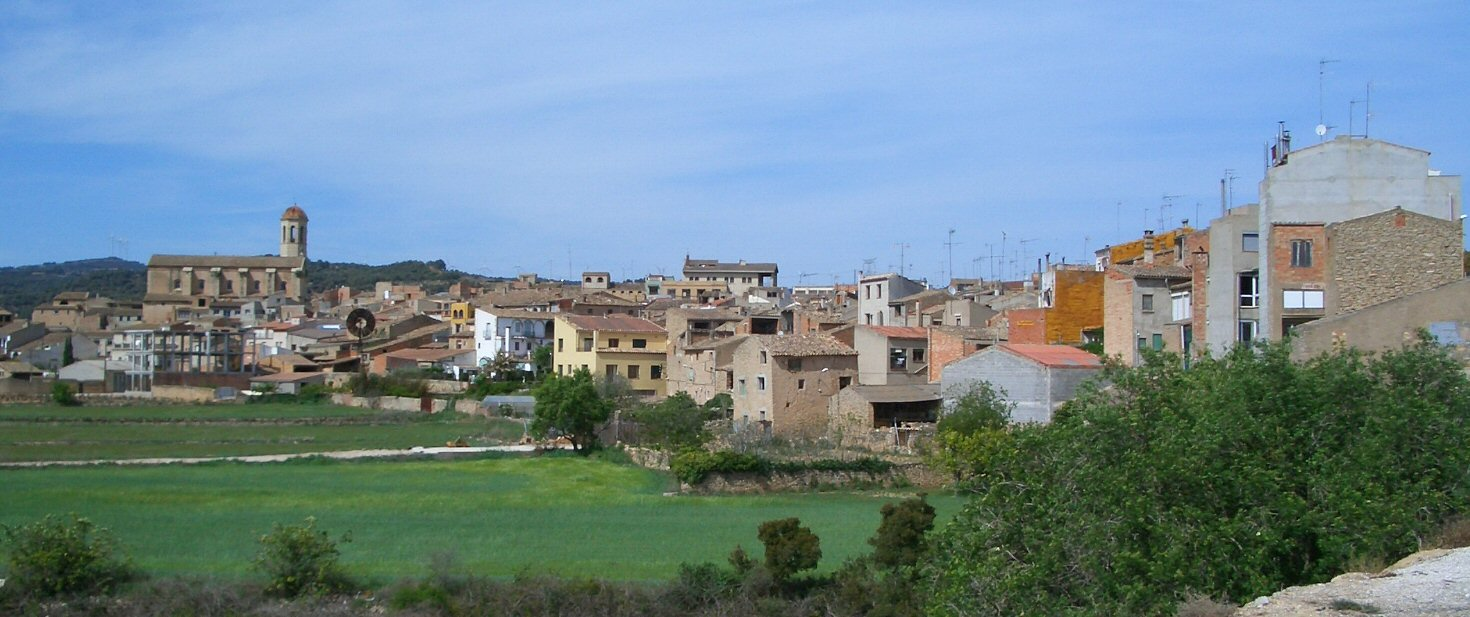

- Flag Coat of arms

- Location in Catalonia
- Coordinates: 41.44°N 1.1606°E
- Country: ESP
- Autonomous community: Catalonia
- Province: Tarragona
- Comarca: Conca de Barberà

Government
  - mayor: Magí Baltà Ventura (2015)

Area
  - Total: 14.5 km^{2} (5.6 sq mi)

Population (2025-01-01)
  - Total: 392
  - Density: 27.0/km^{2} (70.0/sq mi)
- Time zone: UTC+1 (CET)
  - Summer (DST): UTC+2 (CEST)
- Website: www.blancafort.altanet.org

Blancafort (Catalan pronunciation: [ˌblaŋkəˈfɔɾ]) is a municipality in the province of Tarragona and the autonomous community of Catalonia, Spain. It has a population of 392 (register office, 2025).

== History ==
Blancafort was first mentioned in 1207 census documents in which a castle in the name of Pere Romeu y de Fitor Arnau was noted. Blancafort was part of the Dukedom of Montblanc. It was fortified in the fourteenth century. During the War of Succession it declared itself in favor of the Archduke Charles so it was attacked by Philip V's troops. After the war, it was integrated into the township of Tarragona. During the War of Independence it was looted by troops commanded by the French General, Louis Gabriel Suchet.

== Culture ==
The parish church is dedicated to Saint Magdalene and was built on the remains of the ancient Roman temple. It is of ample proportions and of a late Baroque style. It consists of a single nave and a barrel vault cover. The façade is neoclassical. In the old cemetery attached to the temple there is an outstanding collection of preserved tombstones which are today on display in the Diocesan Museum of Tarragona.

The town retains many houses built in the late eighteenth century. Among them is the Can Minguella, better known as the Can Cavaller, from the seventeenth century. The façade shows the family coat of arms. Nothing remains of the old castle except a topographical reference in the street name del Castell.

Blancafort's main festival takes place on the fourth Sunday of August, although for the entire month of August there are activities for people of different ages. Since 1483, there is also a tradition of walking up to the Sanctuary of Tallat, also done during the month of August.
