= Barberà de la Conca =

- Municipality
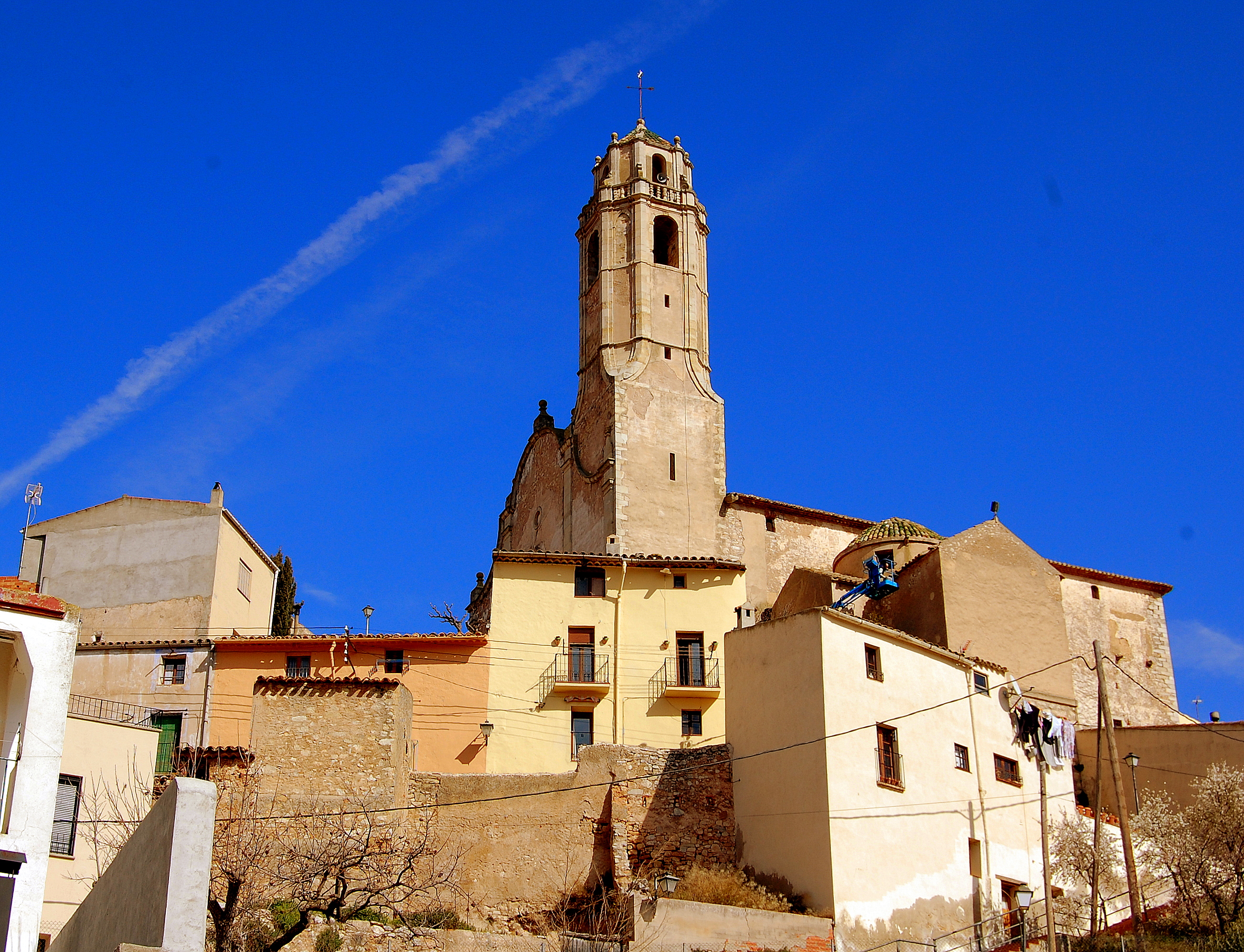

- Flag Coat of arms

- Location in Catalonia
- Coordinates: 41.411°N 1.2278°E
- Country: ESP
- Autonomous community: Catalonia
- Province: Tarragona
- Comarca: Conca de Barberà

Government
  - Mayor: Marc Rovira Miró (2015) (PSC)

Area
  - Total: 26.6 km^{2} (10.3 sq mi)
- Elevation: 475 m (1,558 ft)

Population (2025-01-01)
  - Total: 476
  - Density: 17.9/km^{2} (46.3/sq mi)
- Postal code: 43422
- Website: www.barberadelaconca.cat

Barberà de la Conca (Catalan pronunciation: [bəɾβəˈɾa ðə lə ˈkoŋkɛ]) is a village in the province of Tarragona and autonomous community of Catalonia, Spain. It has a population of 476 (register office, 2025).

== History ==
The region in which Barberà de la Conca is located is named after this village. Some archaeological remains which have been found show that it was inhabited during the time of the Roman occupation. It was first mentioned in 945 with the name of Campo Barberano in a document outlining the donation of the San Pedro church to the Santa Cecilia de Montserrat monastery. In 1012 it appeared in the aforementioned's castrum of Barbará.

At the beginning of the eleventh century the place was uninhabited, it was recovered thanks to Ramón Berenguer I donating it to Arnau Pere de Ponts, called the Puig of Barbará. He was charged with repopulating the area and raising a castle there. The complete repopulation occurred in the twelfth century when the castle was ceded to the Knights of the Order of the Temple.

In 1307 the Templars were imprisoned by order of veguer of Montblanc and the property remained under administration royal until in 1307 when they were taken over by the Knights Hospitallers who retained the lordship until the end of the Old Regime. For over thirty years, the area was ruled by Guillem de Guimerà, a friar who expanded considerably the territory held under the order.

== Culture ==
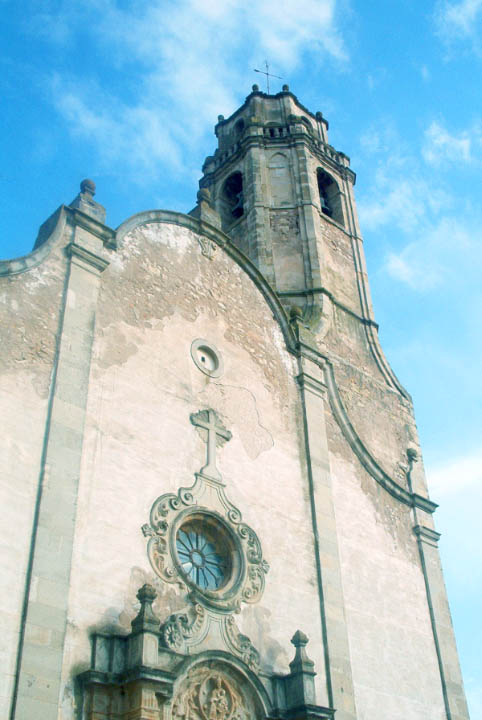
The Santa María Church.

The village grew around the old castle. Built in the eleventh century, the expansion of the Templars were later commissioned, adding, among other aspects, the chapel. For a while it functioned as a public school after Queen Elizabeth II ceded the rights to the municipality. At the end of fulfill that role it was abandoned. It is owned by the municipality.

The parish church is dedicated to St. Mary. This is a three-nave Baroque building that was built in the place that was once the old Roman temple. The tympanum in the old building is still preserved where an image of the Virgin can be seen enthroned. She has the child to her left and everything is framed by a mandorla supported by two angels.

== Economy ==
Currently, Barbará, has agriculture as its major source of socio-economic dynamism. In recent years, thanks to the momentum of the wine sector in the area due to the creation of the OJ Cuenca de Barberà, wine production has intensified. Another engines of the local economy is familial tourism.

== Feasts ==
The main festival is celebrated on the second to last Sunday of August. During the month of May festivals are held in honor of the Virgin of the Rosary.

== Bibliography ==
- Tomàs Bonell, Jordi; Descobrir Catalunya, poble a poble, Prensa Catalana, Barcelona, 1994
