= Pira, Spain =

Pira
- Municipality
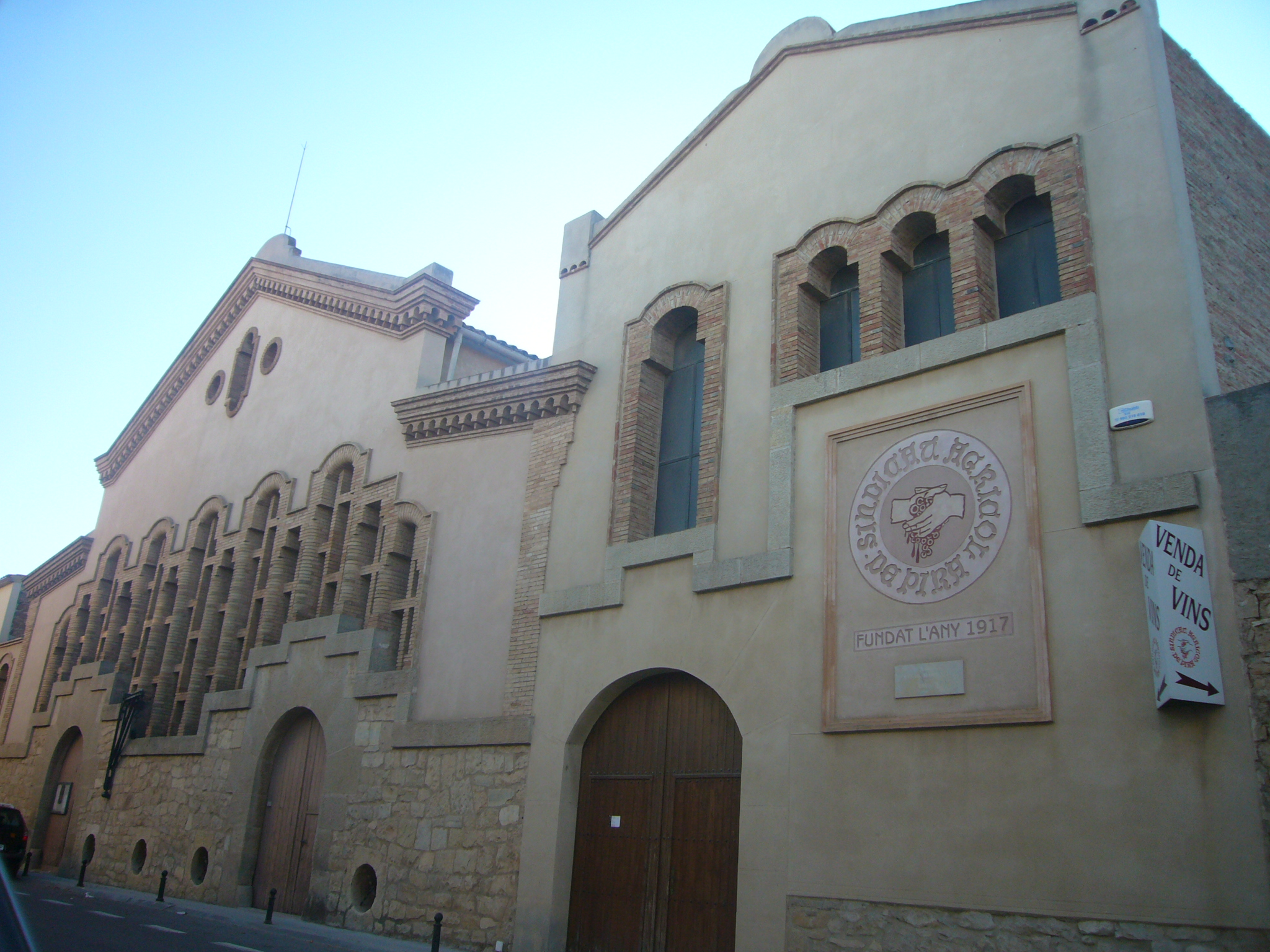
- Agricultural co-operative building in Pira

- Coat of arms

- Location in Catalonia
- Coordinates: 41.417°N 1.2°E
- Country: Spain
- Autonomous community: Catalonia
- Province: Tarragona
- Comarca: Conca de Barberà

Government
  - Mayor: Josep Pijoan Farre (2015)

Area
  - Total: 8.0 km^{2} (3.1 sq mi)

Population (2025-01-01)
  - Total: 512
  - Density: 64/km^{2} (170/sq mi)
- Time zone: UTC+1 (CET)
  - Summer (DST): UTC+2 (CEST)
- Website: www.pira.altanet.org

Pira, Tarragona (Catalan pronunciation: [ˈpiɾə]) is a village in the province of Tarragona and autonomous community of Catalonia, Spain. It has a population of 512 (register office, 2025).
