= Vallbona de les Monges =

- Municipality
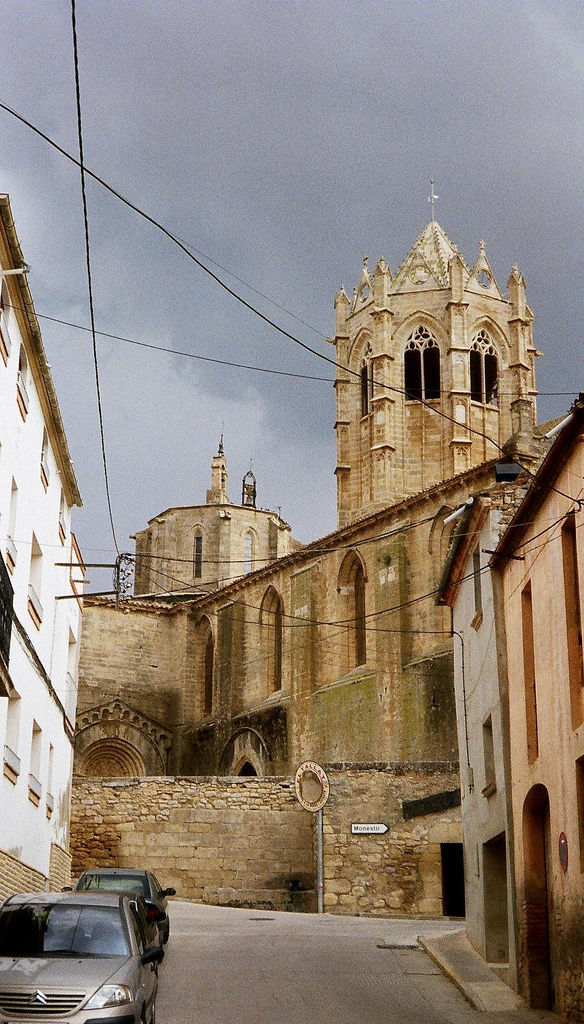
- The monastery

- Flag Coat of arms

- Location in Catalonia
- Coordinates: 41°31′37″N 1°05′26″E
- Country: Spain
- Community: Catalonia
- Province: Lleida
- Comarca: Urgell

Government
  - mayor: Ramon Bergadà Benet (2015)

Area
  - Total: 34.1 km^{2} (13.2 sq mi)
- Elevation: 481 m (1,578 ft)

Population (2025-01-01)
  - Total: 223
  - Density: 6.54/km^{2} (16.9/sq mi)
- Demonym(s): Vallboní, vallbonina
- Postal code: 25238
- Website: vallbona.ddl.net

Vallbona de les Monges (Catalan pronunciation: [ˌbaʎˈβɔna ðe lez ˈmɔɲʒes]) is a municipality in the comarca of the Urgell in Catalonia, Spain. It is located at the southern end of the comarca, north of the Serra del Tallat, Catalan Pre-Coastal Range, where many wind turbines have been installed.

The town has the most important convent in Catalonia, the Monastery of Santa Maria de Vallbona, belonging to the Order of Cistercians. The main income is derived from wine and olive oil production, as well as some cattle rearing. There is some tourism as well, but not enough to significantly lift the economy of the area.

== Villages ==
- Montblanquet, 6
- Rocallaura, 93

Vallbona de les Monges, 157

== Demography ==
It has a population of 223 (register office, 2025).

1900	1930	1950	1970	1986	2007
1034	1084	921	395	n/a	247

== See also ==
- Monastery of Santa Maria de Vallbona
- Tossal Gros de Vallbona
