= Forès =

- Municipality
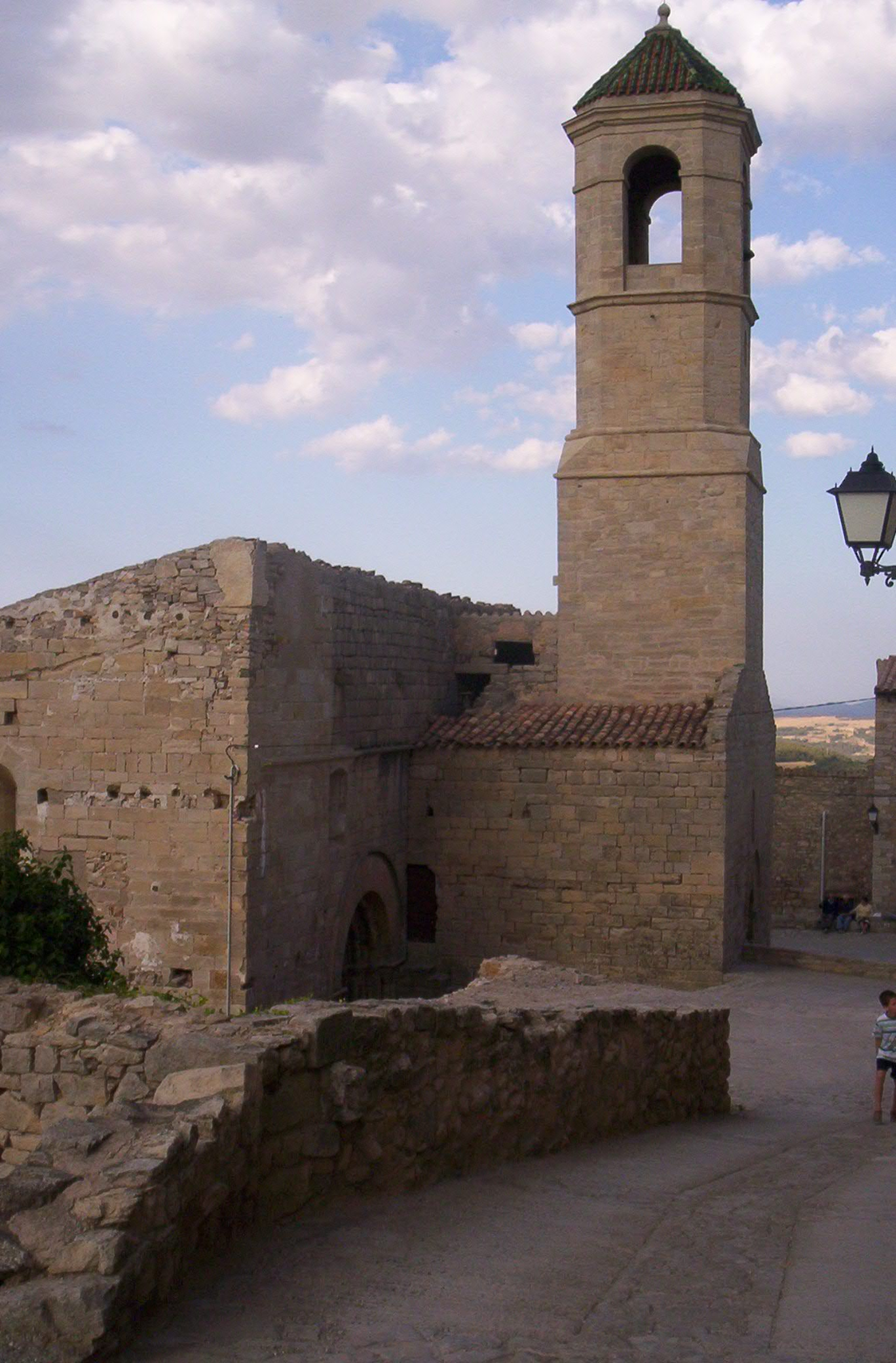

- Coat of arms

- Location in Catalonia
- Coordinates: 41.494°N 1.238°E
- Country: Spain
- Autonomous community: Catalonia
- Province: Tarragona
- Comarca: Conca de Barberà

Government
  - Mayor: Julià Josep Plaza Briansó (2015)

Area
  - Total: 16.0 km^{2} (6.2 sq mi)

Population (2025-01-01)
  - Total: 38
  - Density: 2.4/km^{2} (6.2/sq mi)
- Time zone: UTC+1 (CET)
  - Summer (DST): UTC+2 (CEST)
- Website: www.fores.cat

Forès (Catalan pronunciation: [fuˈɾɛs]) is a municipality and village in the comarca of Conca de Barberà in the Province of Tarragona in Catalonia, Spain. It has a population of 38 (register office, 2025).
