= Anguera =

Municipality of Bahia State, Brazil

- Municipality
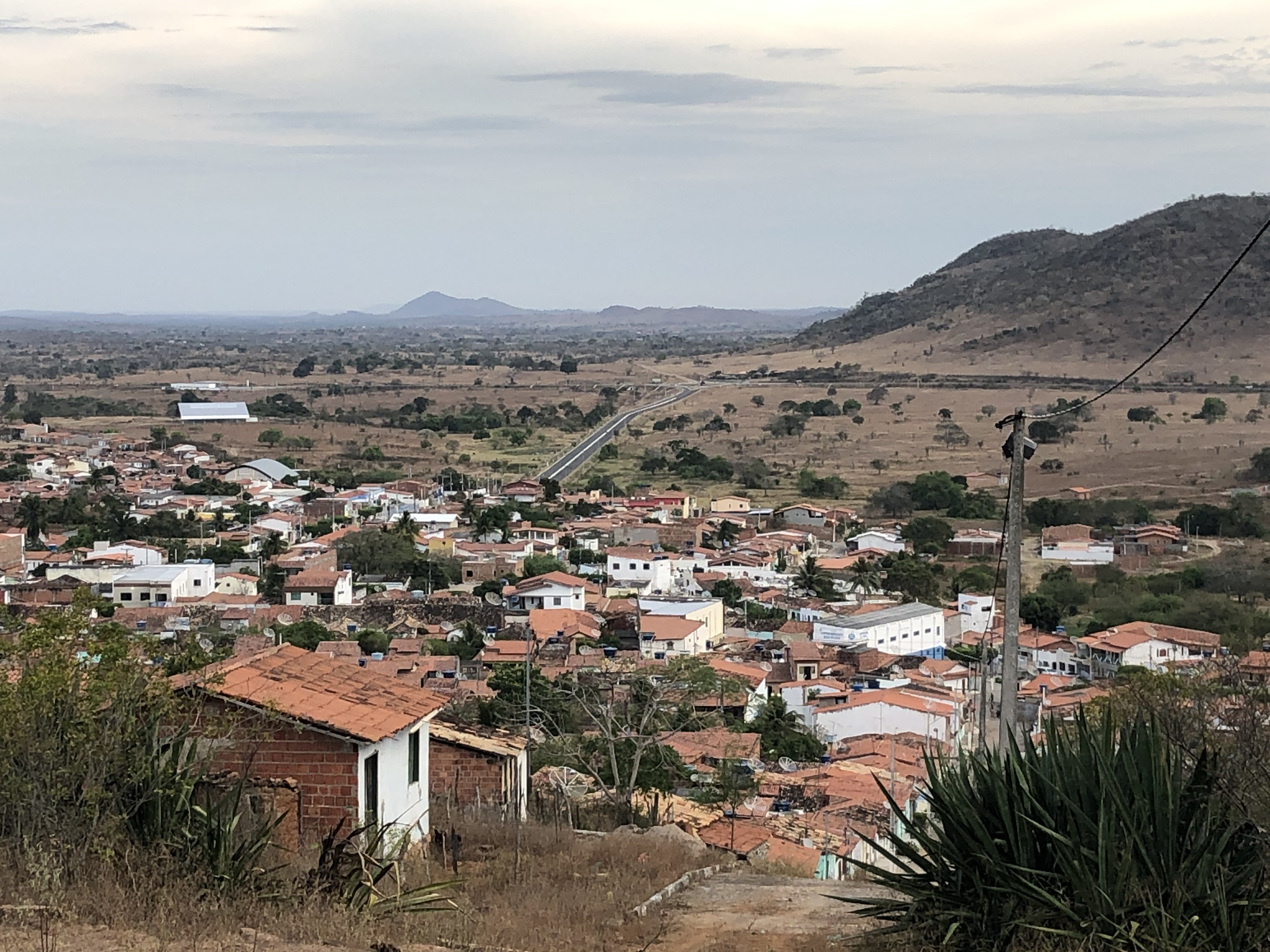

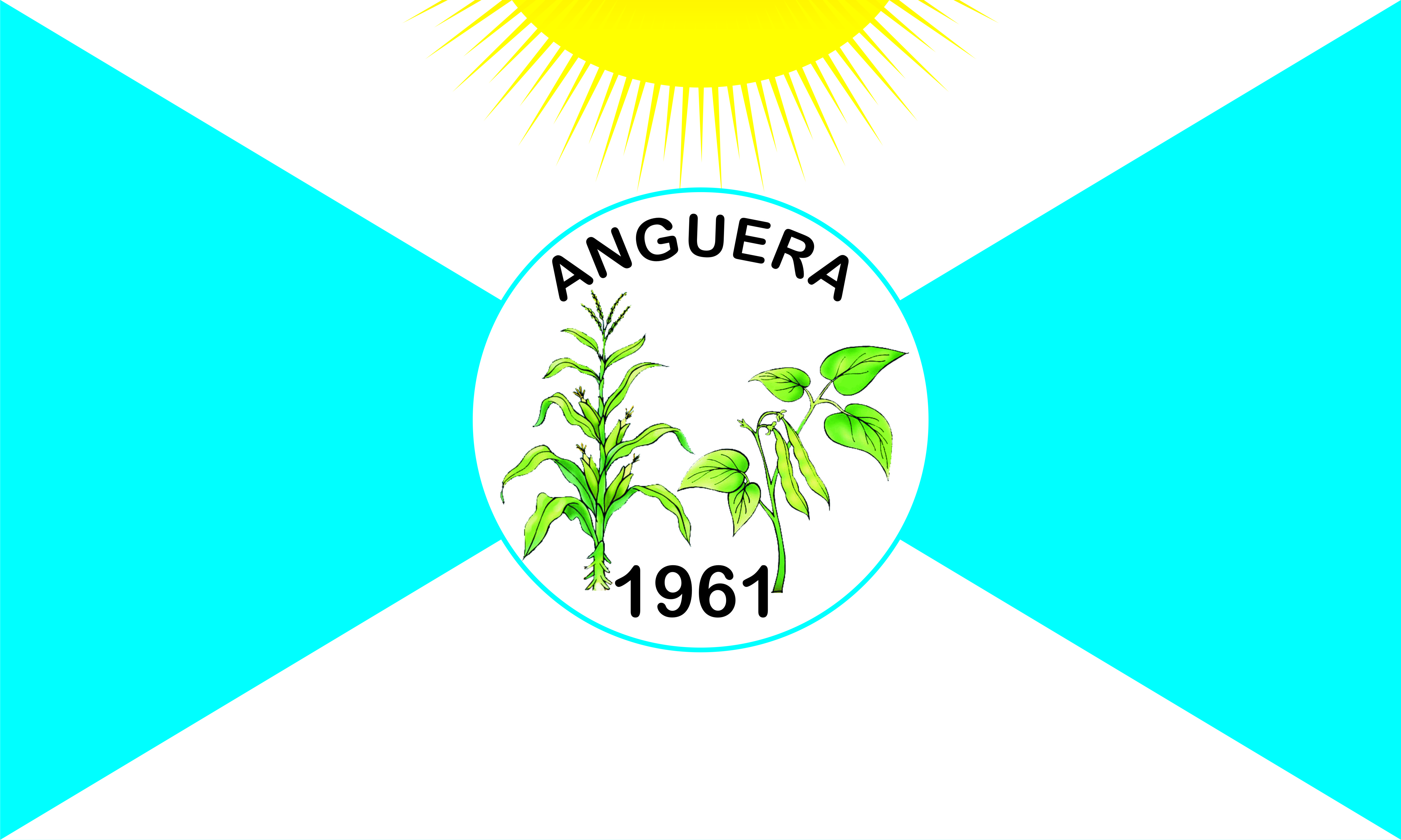
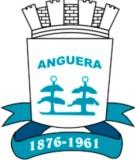
- Flag Coat of arms

- Anguera within the map of Brazil
- Coordinates: 12.149599°S 39.246783°W
- Country: Brazil
- State: Bahia

Population (2020)
  - Total: 11,297
- Time zone: UTC−3 (BRT)

Anguera is a municipality in the Brazilian State of Bahia.
