= Montblanc, Spain =

Montblanc
- Municipality
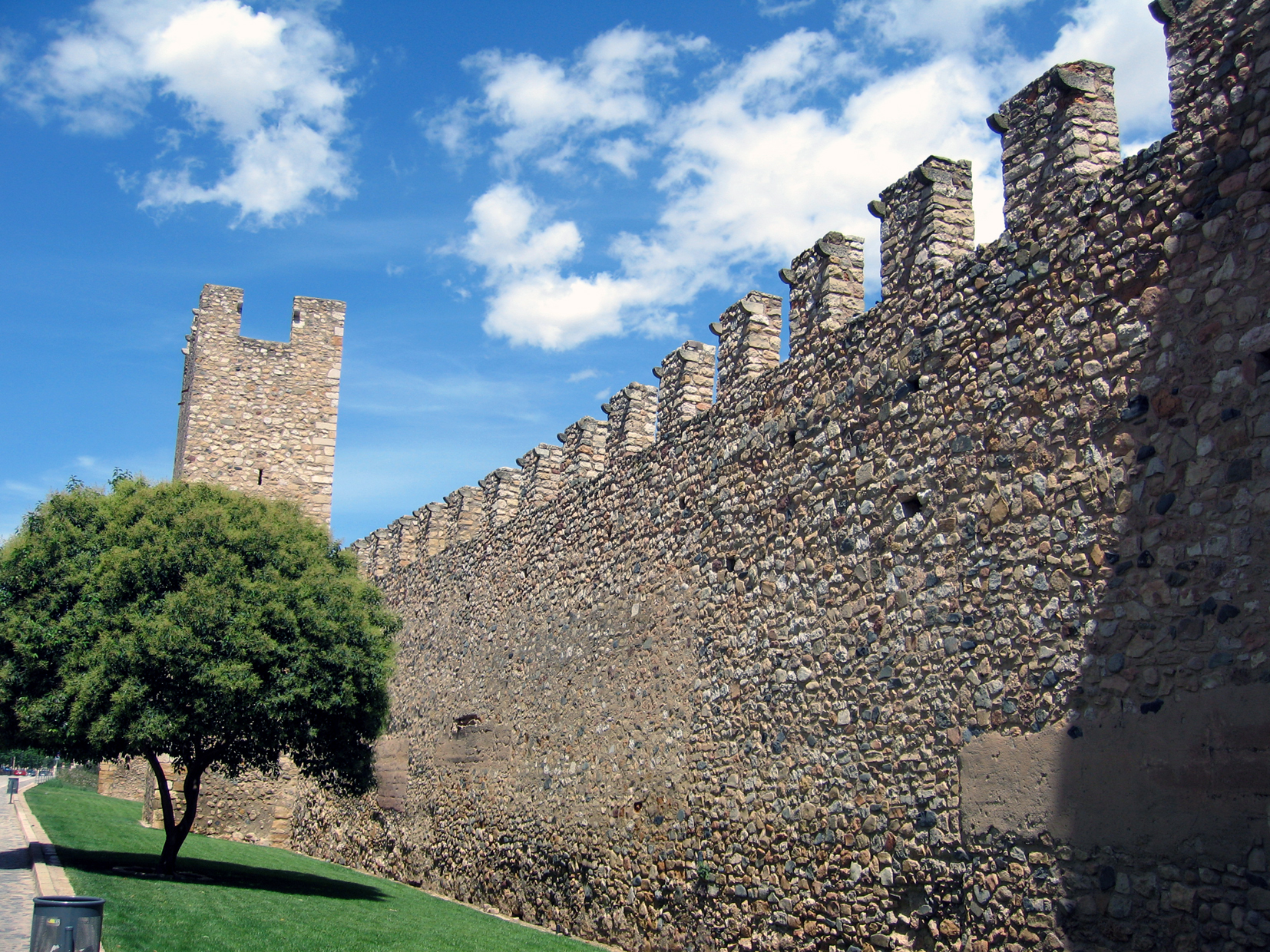

- Coat of arms

- Location in Catalonia
- Coordinates: 41°22′38″N 1°9′50″E
- Country: Spain
- Community: Catalonia
- Province: Tarragona
- Comarca: Conca de Barberà

Government
  - Mayor: Marc Vinya Miralles (2025)

Area
  - Total: 91.1 km^{2} (35.2 sq mi)
- Elevation: 350 m (1,150 ft)

Population (2025-01-01)
  - Total: 7,542
  - Density: 82.8/km^{2} (214/sq mi)
- Demonym: Montblanquí
- Climate: Csa
- Website: www.montblanc.cat

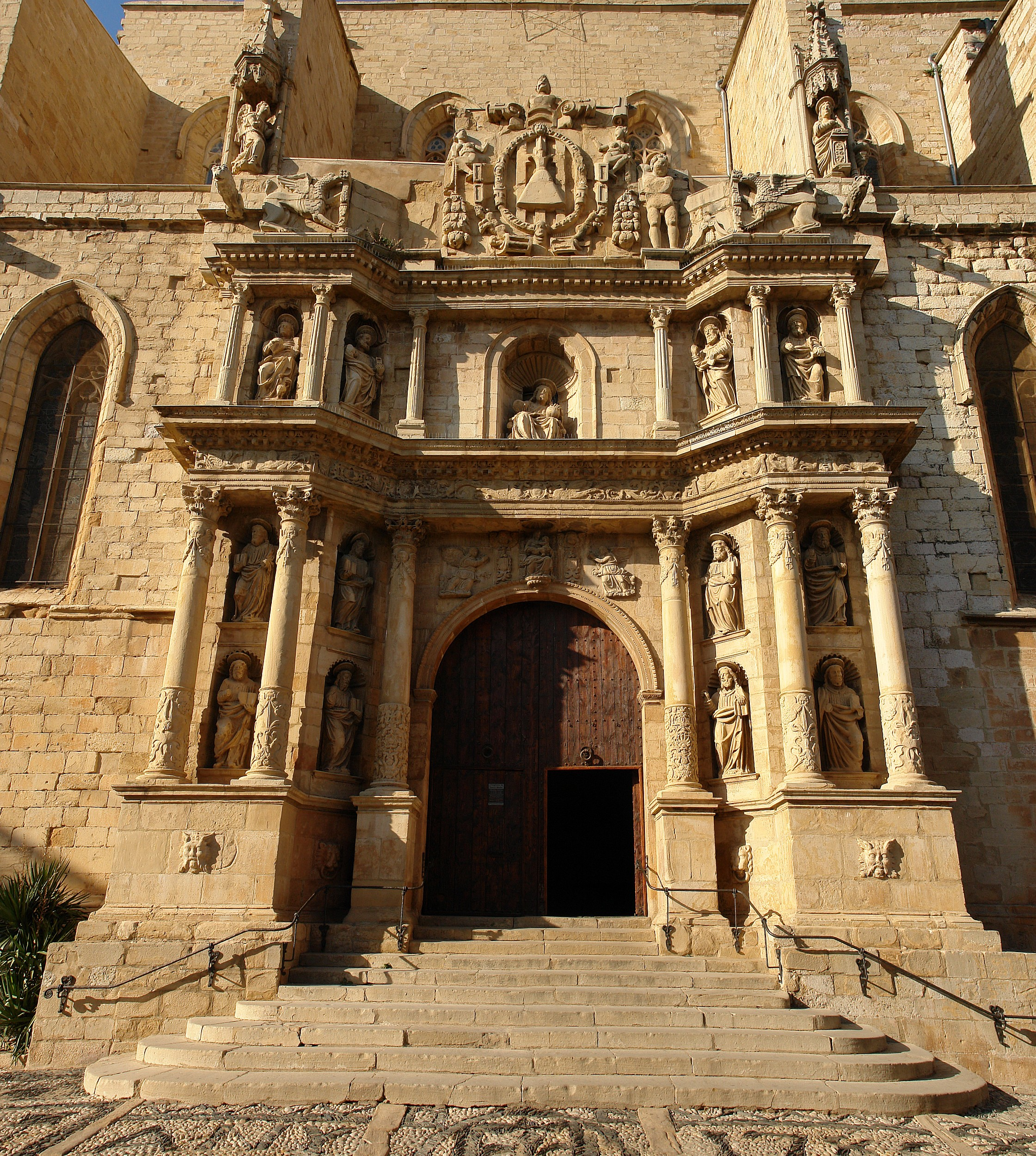
Barroque entrance of the church of Santa Maria

Montblanc (Catalan pronunciation: [mumˈblaŋ]) is the capital of the Catalan comarca Conca de Barberà, in the Spanish province of Tarragona. The Prades Mountains are located in the vicinity of this town.

The municipality comprises the settlements of Montblanc, La Guàrdia dels Prats, Lilla, Prenafeta, Rojals, and El Pinetell. In total it has a population of 7,542 (register office, 2025).

== History ==
The area around Montblanc has been inhabited for thousands of years. Evidence of cave dwellings have been found dating back to Palaeolithic times.

From the 4th to the 1st century BC Iberian villages existed on Santa Bàrbara hill. These villages coexisted with the early Roman settlers. Evidence of Roman artifacts have been found which date from between the 2nd century BC to the 2nd century AD.

After the invasion by the Moors in 711 AD, much of the area became dominated by a patchwork of Islamic fiefdoms. The Islamic invasion initiated a long period of very successful agricultural and commercial development. This was responsible for the birth of many towns and villages in the region which still retain their Islamic names.

The 10th and 11th centuries seem to have been a period of relatively peaceful coexistence in which Muslims, Christians and Jews lived in the region of Montblanc. This productive period continued until an allegiance of forces, strongly supported by the Roman Catholic Church, initiated an era of expulsions, which forced Muslims and Jews to leave the Iberian peninsula.

=== Modern history ===
Since the early 15th century, the parish priest of Montblanch has held the title of Plebán. Today there are only two others: in Oliva and Ontinyent, both in Valencia. At the end of the century, Montblanch fell into disgrace. Poor harvests, epidemics, and the Catalan Civil War put an end to the spectacular growth of the Ducal Town. The walls and many houses and bridges were severely damaged.

During the 16th and 17th centuries, there was an improvement, but the Reapers' War was a severe blow to the town; part of the walls were destroyed, the archives were burned, and during their retreat, General Palavicino's Castilian troops bombarded the Gothic church of Santa María. There were assaults, looting, and fires, all of which definitively ruined the town, which lost its economic and political influence. With the War of Succession, the town lost its privileges and its veguería (administrative district). The War of Independence and the fighting between liberals and Carlists dealt the final blow.

== Notable people ==
Maties Palau Ferré (1921-2000), painter and sculptor, disciple of Pablo Picasso, was born and died in Montblanc.

== Main sights ==
- Convent of Sant Francesc, established around 1238. The church is in Romanesque-Gothic style.
- Gothic church of Santa Maria (14th century)
- Church of Sant Miquel

== Twin towns ==
- Montblanc, France
