= Rocafort de Queralt =

- Municipality
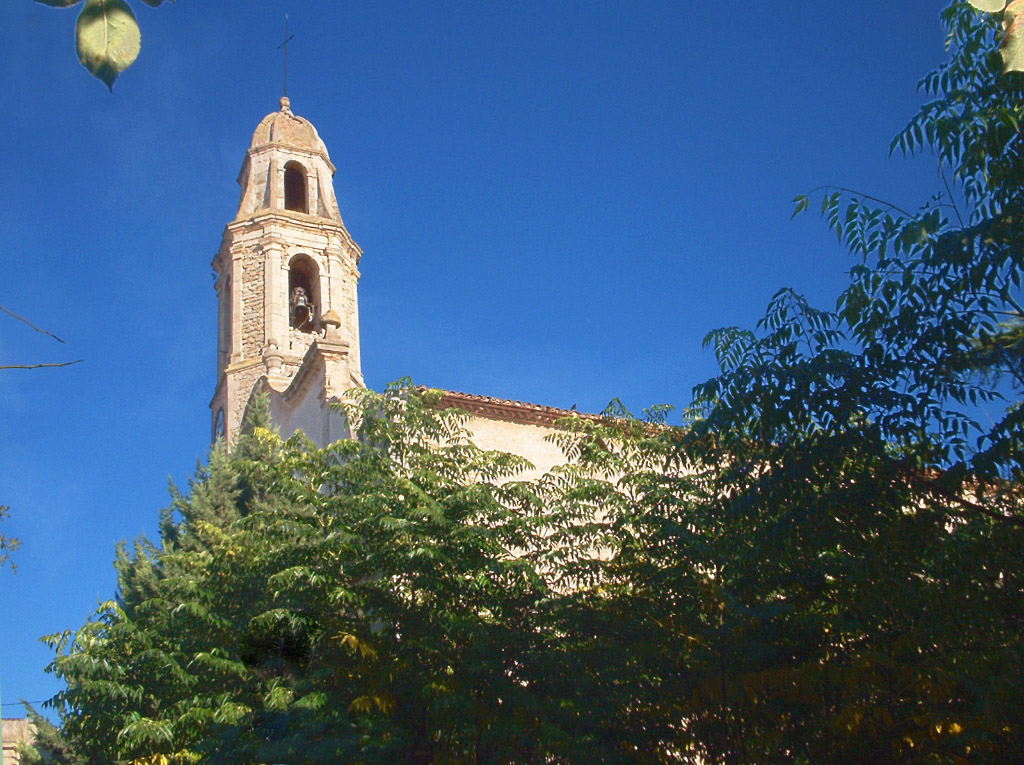

- Flag Coat of arms

- Location in Catalonia
- Coordinates: 41.478°N 1.281°E
- Country: Spain
- Autonomous community: Catalonia
- Province: Tarragona
- Comarca: Conca de Barberà

Government
  - Mayor: Marc Roca Banet (2015)

Area
  - Total: 8.5 km^{2} (3.3 sq mi)

Population (2025-01-01)
  - Total: 247
  - Density: 29/km^{2} (75/sq mi)
- Time zone: UTC+1 (CET)
  - Summer (DST): UTC+2 (CEST)
- Website: rocafortdequeralt.cat

Rocafort de Queralt (Catalan pronunciation: [ˌrɔkəˈfɔɾ ðə kəˈɾal]) is a municipality and village in the comarca of Conca de Barberà in the province of Tarragona in Catalonia, Spain. It has a population of 247 (register office, 2025).

The municipality has an area of 8.6 km^{2}. Its elevation is approximately 562m.

Economic activity is mainly agricultural, principally cereals, vines and wine, principally cava, a sparkling wine. In former times, Rocafort was an important centre for the production of saffron.

The town's origins are obscure, but its castle is mentioned in a document dating back to 1178.
