= Sarral, Spain =

Sarral
- Municipality
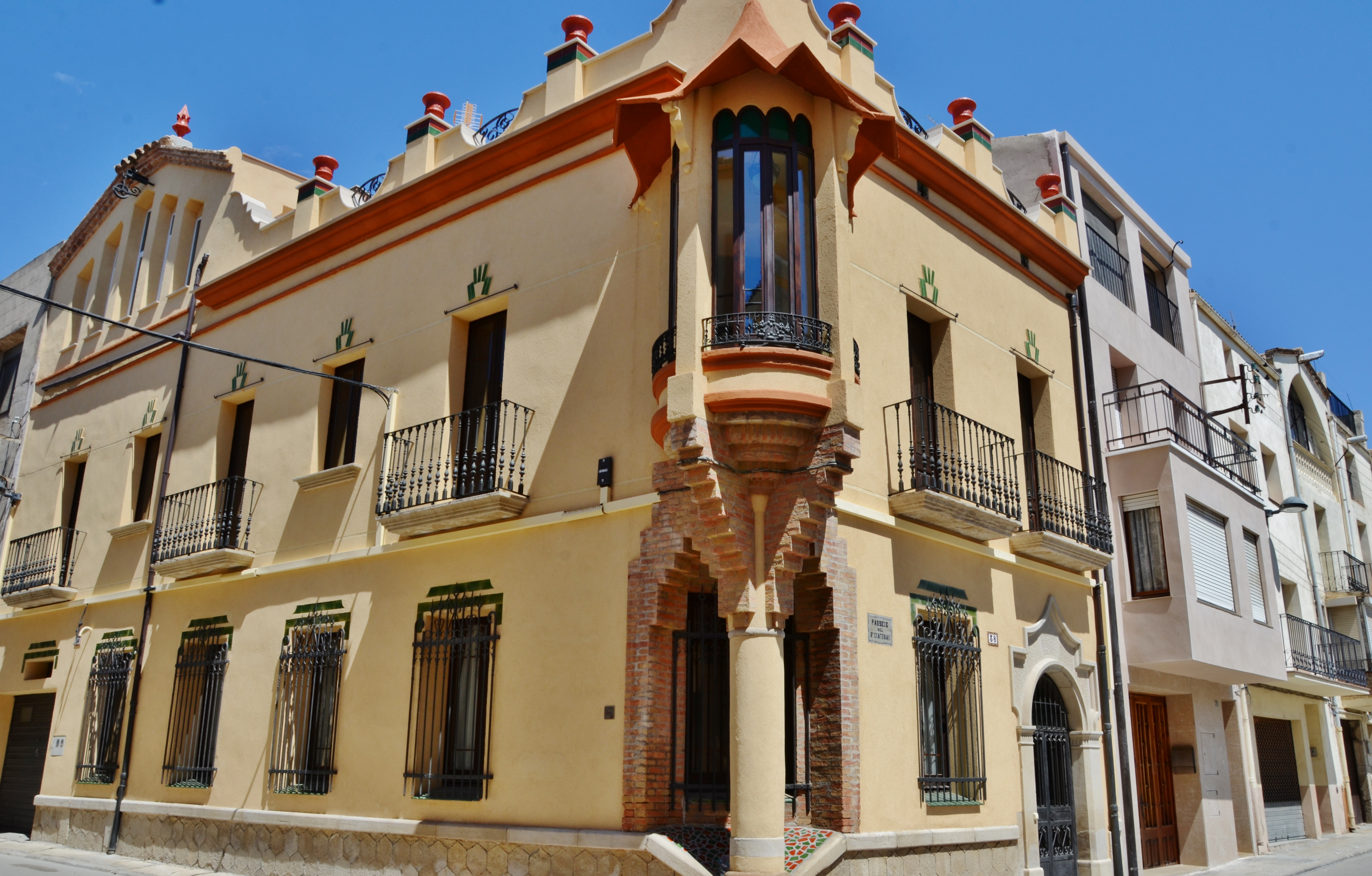
- Can Garrofa, a modernist building in Sarral

- Coat of arms

- Location in Catalonia
- Coordinates: 41.445°N 1.249°E
- Country: Spain
- Autonomous community: Catalonia
- Province: Tarragona
- Comarca: Conca de Barberà

Government
  - Mayor: Josep Amill Canela (2015)

Area
  - Total: 52.4 km^{2} (20.2 sq mi)

Population (2025-01-01)
  - Total: 1,644
  - Density: 31.4/km^{2} (81.3/sq mi)
- Time zone: UTC+1 (CET)
  - Summer (DST): UTC+2 (CEST)
- Website: www.sarral.altanet.org

Sarral (Old Catalan for 'the Royal [Domain]'; Catalan pronunciation: [səˈral]) is a municipality and small town in the comarca of Conca de Barberà in the province of Tarragona in Catalonia, Spain. It includes the settlements of Sarral and Montbrió de la Marca. Montbrió was originally a separate municipality, but was incorporated into Sarral in 1972.

The municipality has an area of 52 km^{2} with an elevation of approximately 467m. It has a population of 1,644 (register office, 2025).

Economic activity is mainly agricultural, principally vines and wine. Sarral produces its own variety of rosé cava (a sparkling wine). The other major traditional activity is quarrying alabaster and producing alabaster sculptures and craftware. Sarral also hosts Spain's biggest producer of frozen bread and pizzas.

The town is ancient, with prehistoric urban remains having been found. It was granted a town charter in 1180. In the 14th century there was a large Jewish colony in the town; a street called Carrer dels Jueus still exists. In 1647 the town was destroyed by Castilian troops.
