= Senan, Spain =

Senan
- Municipality
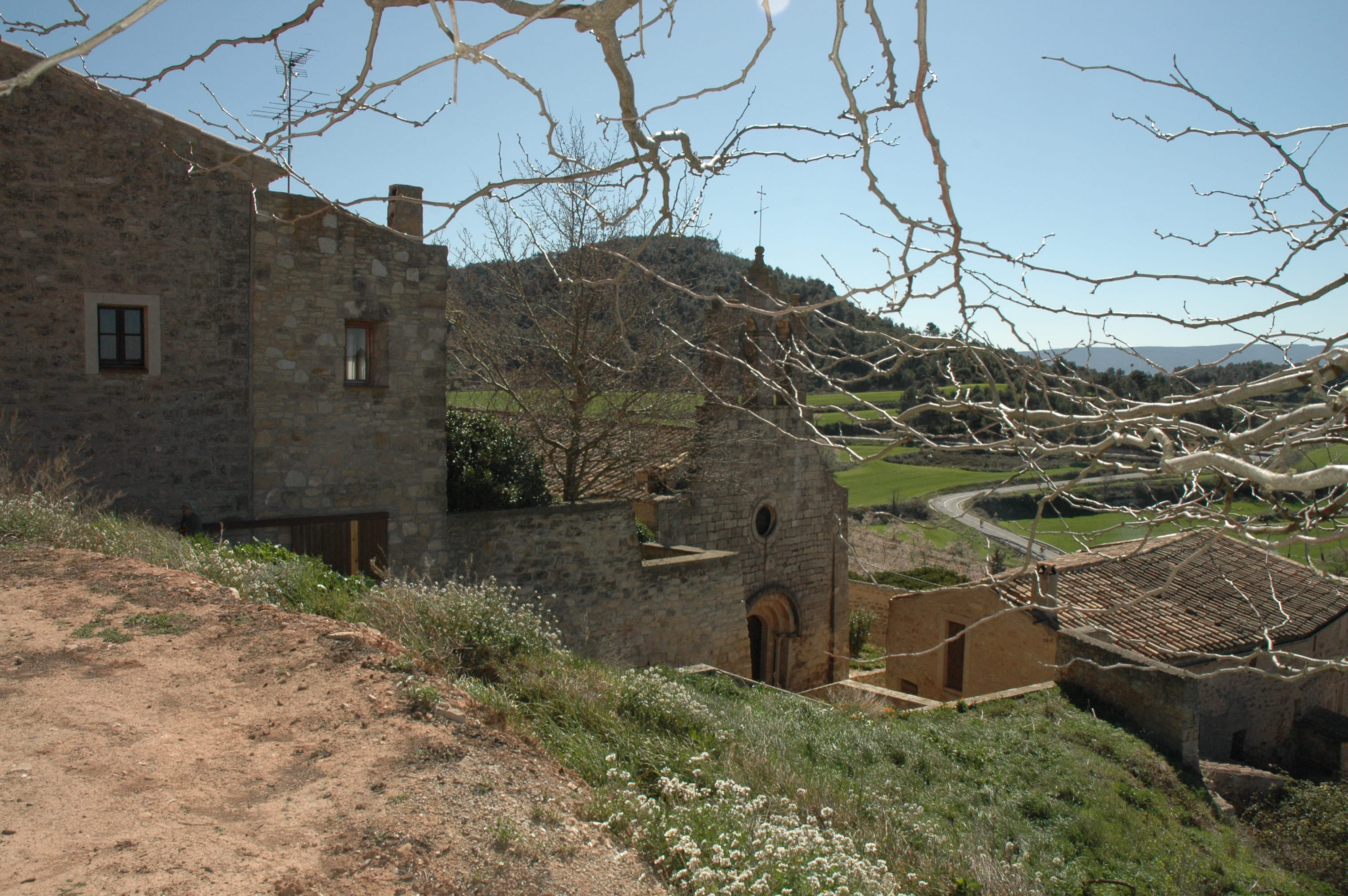

- Flag Coat of arms

- Location in Catalonia
- Coordinates: 41°28′19″N 1°5′18″E
- Country: Spain
- Community: Catalonia
- Province: Tarragona
- Comarca: Conca de Barberà

Government
  - Type: Consell obert
  - Mayor: Carme Ferrer Cervelló (ERC)

Area
  - Total: 11.7 km^{2} (4.5 sq mi)
- Elevation: 652 m (2,139 ft)

Population (2025-01-01)
  - Total: 47
  - Density: 4.0/km^{2} (10/sq mi)
- Postal code: 43146
- Website: www.senan.cat

Senan (Catalan pronunciation: [səˈnan]) is a village and municipality in the comarca of Conca de Barberà in the province of Tarragona in Catalonia, Spain. It has a population of 47 (register office, 2025). It is part of the Garrigues geographic region, but in the 1936 comarcal revision was included in Conca de Barberà.

== History ==
The village has been mentioned in documents as early as 1139.

== Economy ==
Economic activity is agricultural, mainly non-irrigated barley, olives, almonds, and vines.
