= Vimbodí i Poblet =

- Municipality
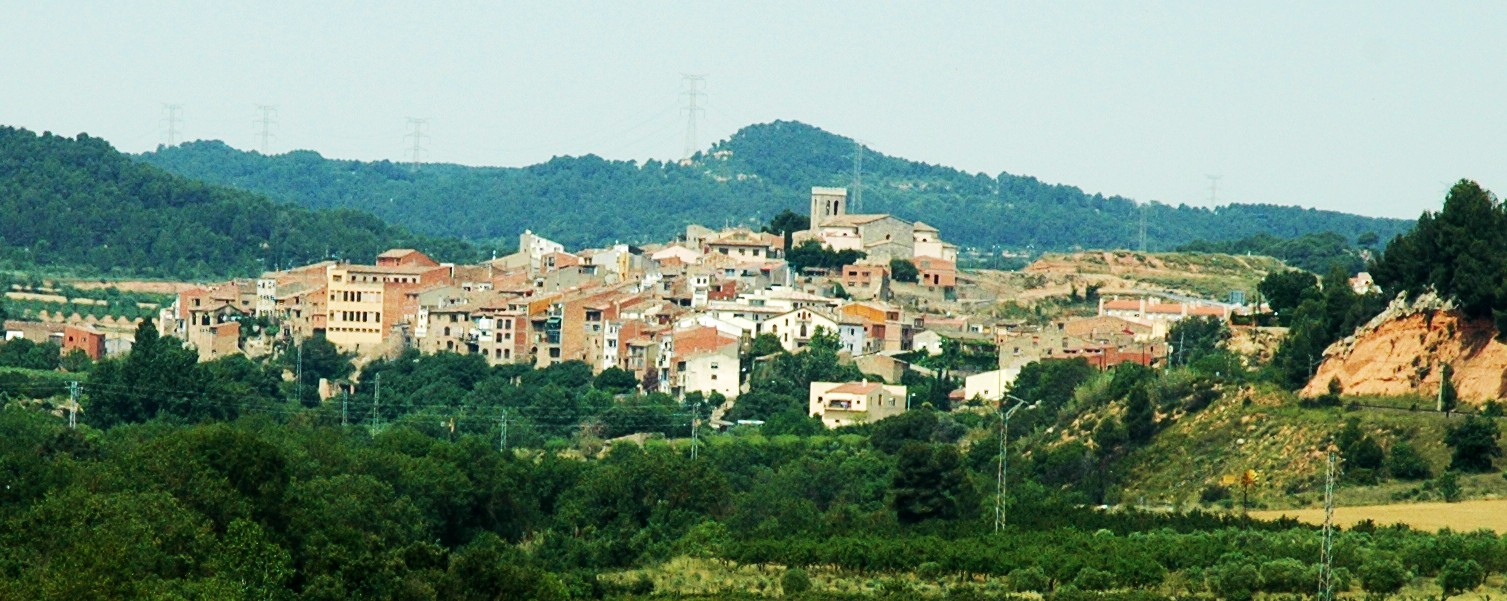

- Coat of arms

- Location in Catalonia
- Coordinates: 41°24′8″N 1°3′4″E
- Country: Spain
- Community: Catalonia
- Province: Tarragona
- Comarca: Conca de Barberà

Government
  - Mayor: Joan Güell Serra (2015)

Area
  - Total: 66.1 km^{2} (25.5 sq mi)

Population (2025-01-01)
  - Total: 887
  - Density: 13.4/km^{2} (34.8/sq mi)
- Website: www.vimbodi.cat

Vimbodí i Poblet (Catalan pronunciation: [vimbuˈði i puˈβlɛt]) is a municipality in the comarca of the Conca de Barberà in Catalonia, Spain. The main settlement is the village of Vimbodí. It has a population of 887 (register office, 2025).

The Prades Mountains are located in the vicinity of this municipality.

== Sights ==
The Monastery of Santa Maria de Poblet is a Cistercian monastery founded in 1151, and has been a UNESCO World Heritage Site since 1991.
