= Conca de Barberà =

- Comarca
- Flag Coat of arms

- Coordinates: 41.367°N 1.15°E
- Country: Spain
- Autonomous community: Catalonia
- Region: Camp de Tarragona
- Province: Tarragona
- Capital: Montblanc
- Municipalities: List: Barberà de la Conca, Blancafort, Conesa, Espluga de Francolí, Forès, Llorac, Montblanc, Passanant i Belltall, Les Piles, Pira, Pontils, Rocafort de Queralt, Santa Coloma de Queralt, Sarral, Savallà del Comtat, Senan, Solivella, Vallclara, Vallfogona de Riucorb, Vilanova de Prades, Vilaverd, Vimbodí i Poblet

Government
  - Body: Conca de Barberà Comarcal Council
  - President: Joan Canela (Junts)

Area
  - Total: 650.2 km^{2} (251.0 sq mi)

Population (2014)
  - Total: 20,723
  - Density: 31.87/km^{2} (82.55/sq mi)
- Demonym
- Time zone: UTC+1 (CET)
  - Summer (DST): UTC+2 (CEST)
- Largest municipality: Montblanc
- Website: https://concadebarbera.cat/

Conca de Barberà (Eastern Catalan: [ˈkoŋkə ðə βəɾβəˈɾa], Spanish: Cuenca de Barberá) is a comarca (county) in the region of Camp de Tarragona, Catalonia, Spain. Its total area is 650.24 km^{2} (251.1 mi^{2}), and its capital is Montblanc.

At its creation in 1936, it contained 23 municipalities, but in 1990, several of these were amalgamated; Rojals was combined with Montblanc, and Montbrió de la Marca was amalgamated with Sarral. Also in 1990, Vallfogona de Riucorb was moved from the Segarra comarca. This resulted in the current total of 22 municipalities.

== Heritage and tourism ==
Conca de Barberà lies at the heart of the Cistercian Route, a cultural and tourist itinerary created in 1989 that connects the three great Catalan Cistercian monasteries. The county's main heritage attraction is the Royal Monastery of Santa Maria de Poblet, located in the municipality of Vimbodí i Poblet, declared a UNESCO World Heritage Site in 1991 and considered the largest inhabited Cistercian monastic complex in Europe.

The county capital, Montblanc, preserves one of the best-conserved medieval walled towns in Catalonia, traditionally regarded as the setting of the legend of Saint George. Nearby is the Interpretation Centre for the Prehistoric Rock Art of the Prades Mountains, featuring fifteen rock art groups dated between 9000 and 2000 BC, inscribed on the UNESCO World Heritage List as part of the Rock Art Sites of the Mediterranean Basin on the Iberian Peninsula.

The county is also home to a group of Modernista wineries, declared Cultural Assets of National Interest by the Generalitat de Catalunya, located in towns such as Barberà de la Conca, Rocafort de Queralt, Solivella, Blancafort, l'Espluga de Francolí, Montblanc and Sarral. Local wine production is protected under the Conca de Barberà Denomination of Origin.

== Geography ==
The comarca of Conca de Barberà is divided into three geographical zones. The lowland sector consists of the physical Conca de Barberà region: the valleys of the Rivers Francolí and Anguera (Conca means a river valley, and Barberà is one of the principal villages in the valley). The capital of the comarca, Montblanc is at the southern end of this sector at the confluence of these two rivers. The northern edge of the Conca is marked by the Serra del Tallat escarpment, which separates it from the Baixa Segarra ("Lower Segarra") region, and the south-western zone of the comarca is formed by the Prades Mountains, part of the Catalan Pre-Coastal Range. which straddle the border between Conca de Barberà and the adjoining comarcas of Alt Camp, Baix Camp, Garrigues and Priorat. These rounded limestone outcrops are clad in forests of pine, oak and chestnut. The climate of the comarca is transitional between a Mediterranean climate and the continental inland climate. The rainfall averages 550 mm (21.7 in), mostly falling in spring and autumn. It can be foggy in winter and the temperature can rise to 38 °C (100 °F) in summer. The comarca has a rich and diverse flora and fauna.

== Wind power ==
The northern Serra del Tallat region is the site of several wind farms. When the Catalan Government's Energy Plan 2006–2015 was prepared with proposals that affected the comarca of Conca de Barberà, opinion was divided. Some municipalities favoured the construction of the wind turbines as generating income which would benefit the community, while others objected to the imposition of such projects by the Catalan authorities without sufficient input by the affected municipalities. In January 2012 it was announced that wind power production in Catalonia had reached 1,000 megawatts, enough to supply over four percent of Catalonia's power needs.

== Municipalities ==
Municipality	Population (2014)	Area km^{2}
Barberà de la Conca	519	26.6
Blancafort	413	14.5
Conesa	122	29.0
l'Espluga de Francolí	3,836	57.0
Forès	46	16.0
Llorac	112	23.3
Montblanc	7,359	91.1
Passanant i Belltall	154	27.4
Les Piles	214	22.4
Pira	480	8.0
Pontils	123	67.6
Rocafort de Queralt	256	8.5
Santa Coloma de Queralt	2,931	33.8
Sarral	1,595	52.4
Savallà del Comtat	65	14.8
Senan	53	11.7
Solivella	653	21.4
Vallclara	116	13.6
Vallfogona de Riucorb	99	10.9
Vilanova de Prades	126	21.5
Vilaverd	487	12.6
Vimbodí i Poblet	964	66.1
• Total: 22	20,723	650.2
