= Corb (river) =

River in Spain

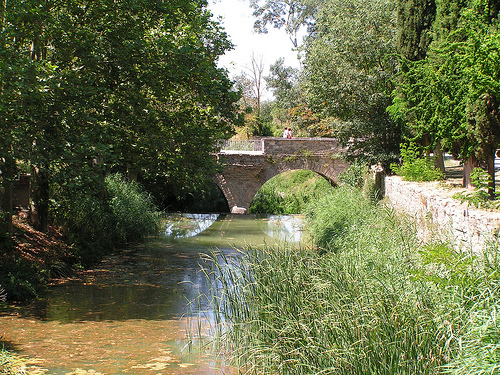
- The Corb at Vallfogona de Riucorb

Location
- Country: Spain

Physical characteristics
- Source
  - location: Llorac municipality, Catalonia, Europe.
  - coordinates: 41.54972°N 1.36196°E
  - elevation: 762 m (2,500 ft)
- Mouth
  - location: Segre
  - coordinates: 41.67795°N 0.71242°E
- Length: 57 km (35 mi)

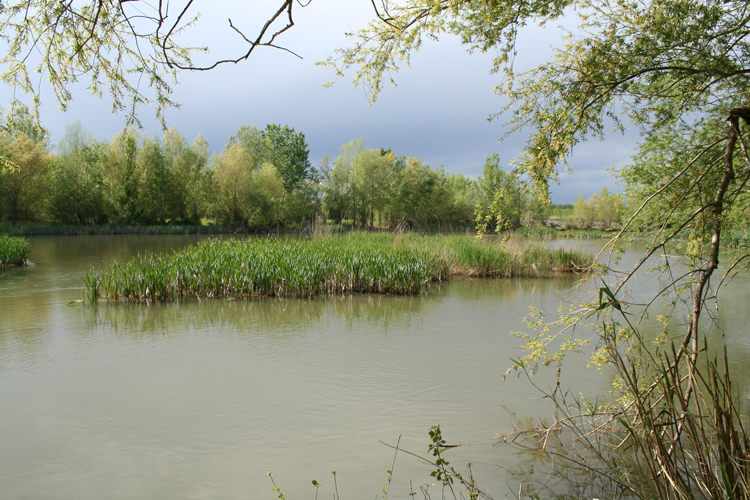
The confluence of the Corb and the Segre

The Corb river (Catalan: el riu Corb or el Riucorb) is a small river in Catalonia, Spain.

It rises at a spring near the village of Rauric, just west of the town of Santa Coloma de Queralt in central Catalonia, flows westwards past the villages of Llorac, Vallfogona de Riucorb, Guimerà, Ciutadilla, Nalec, Rocafort de Vallbona, Sant Martí de Maldà, Maldà, Belianes, then veers northwards across the plain where it disappears into a network of irrigation canals. Its original course collects water again near the town of Bellpuig, then flows west until it joins the river Segre at Vilanova de la Barca, north-east of Lleida city. The Segre flows into the Ebro, one of Spain's major rivers, which enters the Mediterranean in the far south of Catalonia.
