= Teresa Torrelles =

Catalan trade unionist and feminist (1908-1991)

- Born: Teresa Torrelles Espina; 27 May 1908; Nalec, Urgell, Catalonia, Spain
- Died: 18 May 1991 (aged 82); Béziers, Occitania, France
- Occupations: Textile worker, hospital administrator
- Movement: Anarcho-syndicalism, anarcha-feminism

Teresa Torrelles Espina (Note: Also known by the diminutive form Teresina Torrelles.) (27 May 1908 – 18 May 1991) was a Catalan trade unionist, anarcha-feminist activist and hospital administrator. Having worked in the textile industry from an early age, Torrelles joined the anarcho-syndicalist movement at the age of 16. She moved to Terrassa, where she organised a local women's group, which established a libertarian library and secular school. She successfully pushed for the adoption of working women's demands, such as equal pay for equal work and maternity leave, by the local branch of the Confederación Nacional del Trabajo (CNT). She also helped establish the Mujeres Libres, the women's organisation of the CNT. During the Spanish Civil War, she worked as a hospital administrator, overseeing the construction of a clinic with a functioning maternity ward in Terrassa. After the war, she fled to France, then Argentina and Venezuela, before moving back to France, where she died in 1991.

== Biography ==
=== Early life and activism ===
Teresa Torrelles i Espina was born on 27 May 1908, in the Catalan village of Nalec, the daughter of Josep Torrelles and Teresa Espina. Her parents worked as landless farmers on a vineyard, but in 1914, they were forced to move after an outbreak of phylloxera. They settled in Esparreguera, where the whole family worked in the textile plant at Colònia Sedó. At the age of 16, in 1924, Torrelles joined an anarcho-syndicalist group. It was here that she met her partner Joan Graells with whom she had a daughter, Marisol — who would later start a family with the anarchist writer Germinal Gracia. The group was taught by Joan Roigé, a disciple of Francesc Ferrer and a member of the Confederación Nacional del Trabajo (CNT) and organised nature trips to meet and hold clandestine discussions with other established libertarian groups, such as Natura (Nature) or Sol y Vida (Sun and Life), from the Clot district of Barcelona.

=== Labour organising ===
In early 1928, during the repression under Primo de Rivera’s dictatorship, Teresa, already known as an activist, left her home and moved to the city of Terrassa, where she found work in the textile industry and became more involved in the anarchist movement through the Mutualidad Cultural y Cooperativista (Cultural and Cooperative Society) — due the banning of trade unions, persecuted activists managed to continue their political work clandestinely through cultural organisations.

She established a local women's group, which was formed during a countryside outing with other activists. The members welcomed the opportunity to enjoy a degree of autonomy previously denied to them, as they could discuss issues that concerned them without having to endure the disparaging remarks they used to receive from male workers when they spoke out in trade union debates. The group organised talks on ideological, cultural and sexual issues with the aim of encouraging women to be more open-minded and addressing topics such as conscious motherhood and sex education, which were considered taboo at the time.

With this group she helped set up a libertarian library and a secular school, to which she invited the rationalist teacher Antonia Maymón to lecture. Torrelles' women's group affiliated with the textile workers' union of the CNT and began holding meetings at a local cultural centre of the Federación Anarquista Ibérica (FAI), where they discussed issues they wanted to raise collectively at union assemblies. As the group's main leader, she took a prominent role in organising women that worked in the city's textile industry.

The group developed a strong anarchist feminist tendency, which was honed over a series of debates and lectures on a variety of topics. They also organised tours of the countryside, in order to encourage closer companionship and a love of nature, and excursions to other cities, where they networked with other anarchist and feminist groups. During a general strike in Barcelona in 1930, she smuggled weapons and ammunition into the capital, concealed beneath her coat, and distributed them to anarchist workers at La Rambla.

By the proclamation of the Second Spanish Republic in 1931, the group had succeeded in getting the CNT's local branch to take up its demands of equal pay for equal work and an extension of maternity leave for both married and unmarried mothers. But this was an exceptional case, as very few of the CNT's unions adopted these demands; Torrelles herself attributes their success in Terrassa to the strength of the women's group there, where working women weren't as well-organised in other parts of the country. The Terrassa women's group itself continued to educate and organise working women throughout the 1930s. In 1936, Torrelles participated in the founding of the Mujeres Libres, the CNT's own women's organisation, for which she organised conferences and wrote a number of anarcha-feminist articles.

=== Health administration during the civil war ===
In the first days of the Spanish Civil War, the Terrassa women's group established a nursing school and an emergency clinic to treat wounded fighters. They outfitted the clinic with beds from their own houses, and were aided in their efforts by voluntary donations, as well as resources requisitioned from the local government. She reported that, on the first day of the war:

I went to the operating room, and looked around. I put things in their places, and saw what we needed. And then I went to City Hall and said, this and this is what we need... They either gave it to me or arranged for me to get it. If we needed alcohol, for example, I went to the pharmacy and got it, with money they gave me, because we had nothing, not even disinfectant.

Torrelles became an apprentice of the CNT physician Juan Paulís, under whom she established the Gota de Llet (Drop of Milk) hospital, the city's first maternity clinic. Due to her experience in labour organising, she was quickly appointed as the hospital administrator. She reported that the job was difficult, as many of the health workers were reluctant to adjust to her anarchist way of doing things:

The midwives - there were twelve of them - went on strike. They refused to work for us... When they returned to work, they would eat first and give the women who had given birth what was left over. I said, "This cannot be." So I took the food and took it around to the patients, and what was left, I took to the kitchen for the nurses and midwives. We used diapers with buttons, instead of pins, because Dr. Paulís said that the pins weren't safe for the babies, I had to arrange that, too...
I remember how many times fathers would come up to me in the clinic to request something, and I would say, "Please, here all of us are equals." And they would say to me, "Here, you really have made the revolution." I had such satisfaction from this. Because I administered the whole thing without any education... What I believed, that's what I put in practice there... And that's what I can tell you of what I did for the revolution. The rest, I did what everyone else did. But this, this was something I did.

She held this position throughout the war, even after joining the Terrassa Town Council. In October 1938, she was nominated by the Barcelona branch of the Mujeres Libres to be their secretary for propaganda, but she declined the nomination. That same month, her partner Joan Graells was killed while fighting in the Battle of the Ebro.

=== Later life ===
She lived in Terrassa until January 1939, when the Nationalists' Catalonia Offensive forced her to flee the country. Recently discharged from hospital and ill, Torrelles to the France–Spain border carrying nothing but the clothes she wore. She was held in a concentration camp in Clermont-Ferrand, then transferred to another in Argelers. During World War II, she collaborated with the French Resistance.

Together with Marisol, now fifteen, in 1948, she moved to Argentina, where she joined the Argentine Regional Workers' Federation (FORA) and participated with the CNT in exile. In 1958, she moved to Venezuela. She lived in Caracas, where she participated in the publication of the Libertarian Youth's magazine Ruta, until 1966, when she returned to France and settled in Montady.

When Martha Ackelsberg was doing research for her book on the Mujeres Libres, Free Women of Spain, she was introduced to Torrelles by Sara Berenguer. The interview took place at her house in Montady, on 28 April 1988. Torrelles spent hours discussing her experiences with Ackelsberg, becoming a key primary source for the book.

Teresa Torrelles died on 18 May 1991, in the hospital at Béziers. Her daughter Marisol herself died from COVID-19 on 29 March 2020, at the start of the COVID-19 pandemic in Spain. The historian Teresa Rodríguez Herrerías has published a biography about Torrelles, titled Torrelles Espina, una lluitadora per la revolució social (English: Teresa Torrelles Espina, a fighter for the social revolution).

== Bibliography ==
- Ackelsberg, Martha A. (2005) [1991]. Free Women of Spain: Anarchism and the Struggle for the Emancipation of Women. Oakland, California: AK Press. ISBN 1-902593-96-0. LCCN 2003113040. OCLC 63382446.
- Berenguer, Sara (2004). Entre el Sol y la Tormenta: Revolución, Guerra y Exilio de una Mujer Libre [Between the Sun and the Storm: Revolution, War and Exile of a Free Woman] (in Spanish) (2nd ed.). Eixam Edicions. ISBN 978-84-96014-27-5.
- Espílez Murciano, Felipe (3 October 2021). "Teresa Torrelles Espina". Encima de la Niebla (in Spanish).
- Martin, Mònica (28 April 2022). "Presentació del llibre biogràfic de l'activista i regidora Teresa Torrelles". Terrassa Digital (in Catalan).
- Pardo, Fèlix (3 November 2021). "Teresa Torrelles Espina". Malarrassa (in Catalan).
