= Calaix de sastre =

Diary written by Rafael de Amar y de Cortada

- Author: Rafael de Amat y de Cortada
- Language: Catalan
- Publication date: 1769–1819
- Publication place: Spain

Calaix de sastre (transl. Tailor's Drawer) is a personal diary in 52 volumes written by Rafael de Amat y de Cortada, Baron of Maldá, throughout his life, from the age of 23 (three years after his marriage) until his death, that is, from 1769 to 1819. The title, Calaix de sastre, is the title given by the author himself, referring to the place where the most diverse things are kept. It is considered one of the most important texts of Catalan narrative between the 15th and 19th centuries, as well as a precedent of costumbrismo and local journalism. It is also an important historical document for its detailed description of facts, events and social behavior in the Catalonia of its time. However, it has never been published in its entirety, but only some compilations of fragments. A copy is preserved in the Historical Archive of the City of Barcelona.

== Motivation and objectives ==
At the time of the Calaix de sastre, diary writing was common in all social classes, especially among people whose work required them to keep practical daily notes, such as shopkeepers. Felipe Cirera, famous cook of the Episcopal palace, recommended it to housewives to control expenses. The peasants mixed aspects of domestic economy with community events. The nobles wrote diaries with personal anecdotes simply for the pleasure of collecting information and because they were very attentive to the collective they formed, but, contrary to what would happen later, there was no intention of publication but the diary was restricted to an intimate and personal use. Later, autobiographical writings were written for the public and often to justify facts and actions.

For the Baron of Maldà it was a hobby that simply brought him personal satisfaction. He started with the idea of it being like a small journalistic gazette, at a time when the current mass media did not yet exist, but there was a lot of interest in finding out reliable news and differentiating them from false rumors. He was interested in various news, politics, what was happening in the city of Barcelona, mechanical innovations or his family and servants, but also what today could be considered gossip and that for him was curiosity and interest in what his neighbors were doing. Gradually, parties and trips began to take on importance, and later he himself writes in his diary that he read fragments aloud at small gatherings, to distract and make friends laugh. Reading aloud in small groups was a much appreciated and highly valued amusement in society.

Later, a new motivation for personal reflection was also gradually added: to order his own thoughts and experiences and to provide an intimate space. On his travels, he used to take some of his own old texts to revise and correct them, as a distraction and as an escape route to combat bad moods, uneasiness and worries. Another motivation was to show his specific knowledge, for example in music, and to write about things he liked, such as music itself or the description of landscapes, etc. in addition to giving his point of view and opinion about what he narrated.

== Contents ==
The Baron of Maldà wrote in his diary everything he did throughout the day, the life of his family and that of the other nobles he visited, as well as news and social chronicles. He described in great detail the festivities and various cultural events. On designated occasions he would list all the dishes and treats on the menu, as well as the presentation, tablecloths and cutlery. He paid close attention to physical appearance and attire. However, the lower urban social classes are not reflected, except for some of his closest servants, probably because he had no contact with them. Nor are there many comments about peasants.

Regarding gastronomy, for example, it is said that the meals of the wealthy classes consisted of five courses and were always based on meat. Fish was relegated to Lent and cow's milk, which was considered harmful to health, was only drunk as a remedy prescribed by the doctor when sick. Ice cream and sorbets were common at receptions, and rice dishes and omelets for outings. On some occasions, diners would get so full that they were unable to eat. The latter happened to the rich, like the baron himself, since most of the population ate mainly potatoes and onions.

== Style ==
The organization of his writings was done by days, properly dated. The corresponding daily article began with the date, the day of the week, the saint and the weather. Then, each day, the news was arranged in order of importance, first the most important and then the anecdotes. At first he was more neutral, but when he began to write to make people laugh, he described scenes, although true, ridiculed, and insisted more on passages that were intended to be satirical. To achieve this he did not hesitate to talk about snoring, farting and other scatological considerations. It should be explained that at that time it was not considered rude and in bad taste, but rather it was highly celebrated and that there was a whole festive-scatological tradition and uninhibited literature on the subject. The Calaix de sastre is subjective, the author takes the opportunity to criticize the customs with which he does not agree, and in particular the new social forms and attitudes that appear in an era as full of radical changes as his own. Nor does he like the new working class that will be born of the Industrial Revolution, the lowest class socially in the city, who work in the first factories, called "factory people" and who, because of their behavior and misery, he considers dangerous. He writes without a special method, it may even seem that he does it carelessly. The style seems to be baroque although Albert Rossich has considered it rococo.

== Publications ==
The entire Calaix de sastre has never been published, but some fragments selected by periods have been published in ten different volumes. There have also been some compilations by themes, such as:

- Xocolata cada día: a taula amb el baró de Maldà (ISBN 84-8264-510-2)
- Exili de Barcelona i viatge a Vic, 1808, published in 1991 by the Abadía de Montserrat in collaboration with the City Council of Vic. In addition to the part of Calaix de sastre corresponding to the French War or the occupation of Barcelona by the French (from September to November 1808), it contains a long introduction explaining the historical events in which it appears and analyzes the figure of Baron de Maldà and the whole of Calaix de sastre.
- Viatge a Maldà y Anada a Montserrat, published together in a single volume by the Abbey of Montserrat in 1986. El viatge a Maldà is a continuous piece of Calaix de Sastre in which the baron describes all the villages of Catalonia through which he passes. Anada a Montserrat is a much shorter text. It also includes some pages about the baron's trips to Vilafranca del Penedès, Tarragona and Piera.
- Costums i tradicions religiosos de Barcelona is a 93-page compilation in which the baron describes the Catholic traditions he lived, published by Akribos in 1987 under the direction of Mn. Josep Maria Martí i Bonet, archivist of the Archdiocese of Barcelona.

Other publications contain fragments of Calaix de sastre in thematic compilations of texts together with others by different authors, such as Alexandre Galí in 1954 and Ramon Boixareu in various volumes since 1984. An example is Revolució a Barcelona el 1789, in which there are texts from the diary of the Baron of Maldà, but also of the Count of Creixell, or also El col-legi de la bona vida, published with the play Lucrecia, by Juan Ramis.

== Bibliography ==
- Exili de Barcelona i viatge a Vic, 1808 (it received the Sent Soví Prize in 2003 and was republished in 2004. A Spanish translated edition, Chocolate todos los días, has been published on the official website of RBA, one of the award's grantors.) (in Catalan). compilation of fragments of gastronomic content, by Joan de Déu Domènech and edited by La Magrana. L'Abadia de Montserrat. 1991. ISBN 84-7826-216-4.
- La Gran Enciclopèdia en català: tomo 4 (in Catalan). Barcelona: Edicions 62. 2004. ISBN 84-297-5432-6.
- Eberenz, Rolf (1977). El "Calaix de Sastre" del Baró de Maldà i la problemática de la "Decadencia" (in Catalan). pp. 205–222. ISBN 84-7202-153-X.
- Barón de Maldà (2005). Calaix de sastre XI (in Catalan). Barcelona: Curial Edicions Catalanes SA. ISBN 978-84-7256-806-8.
