= Vallfogona de Riucorb =

- Municipality
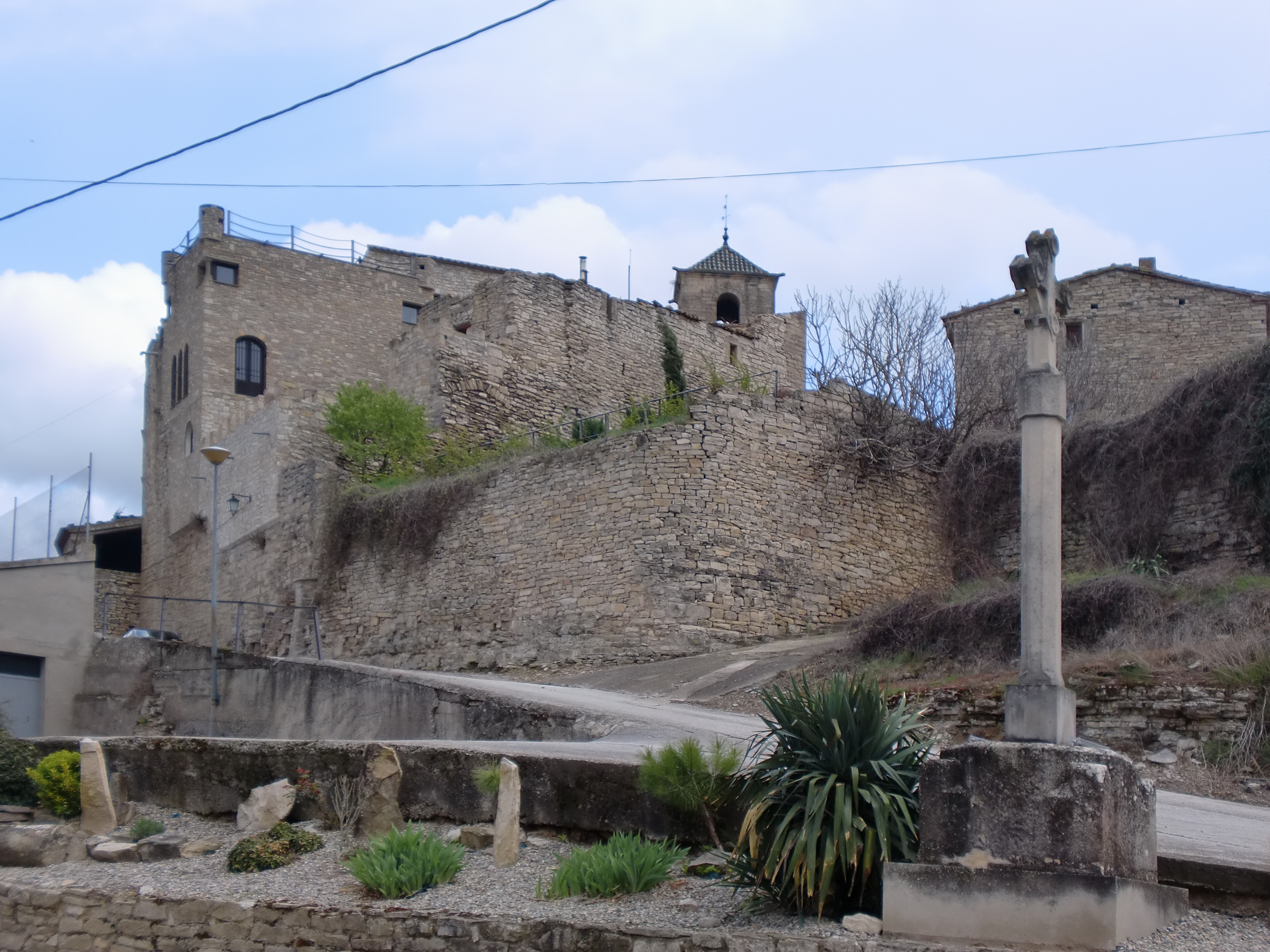
- Vallfogona's castle and creu de terme (boundary cross)

- Flag Coat of arms

- Location in Catalonia
- Coordinates: 41.5633°N 1.2365°E
- Country: Spain
- Community: Catalonia
- Province: Tarragona
- Comarca: Conca de Barberà

Government
  - Mayor: Francesc Xavier Llobet Albareda (2015)

Area
  - Total: 10.9 km^{2} (4.2 sq mi)
- Elevation: 698 m (2,290 ft)

Population (2025-01-01)
  - Total: 95
  - Density: 8.7/km^{2} (23/sq mi)
- Demonym: Vallfogoní
- Postal code: 43159
- Website: www.vallfogonaderiucorb.cat

Vallfogona de Riucorb (Catalan pronunciation: [ˌbaʎfuˈɣonə ðə ˌriwˈkɔɾp]) is a municipality and village in the comarca of the Conca de Barberà in central Catalonia. It is situated in the Comalats range in the north of the comarca, with the Cap de Cans rising to 759 m. Vallfogona village is built on the south bank of the Corb river. It has a population of 95 (register office, 2025).

It is known for the medicinal mineral water that flows from a local spring, and for the priest and Baroque poet Francesc Vicent Garcia (1579–1623), "El Rector de Vallfogona." Garcia wrote mostly satirical verse, and was acquainted with notable authors of the time such as Lope de Vega. He ordered the construction of the chapel of Santa Bàrbara in 1617.

== History ==
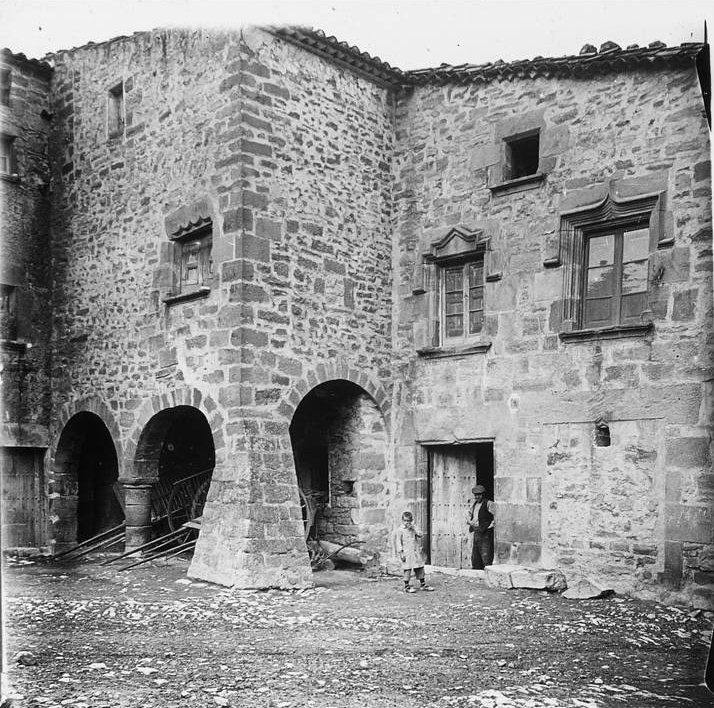
Vallfogona in 1916

The first historical reference to Vallfogona records the founding of the parish in 1123 after its reconquest from the Moors, who had called it Vall d'Alfes. The town was a fief of the noble house of the Counts of Queralt. By 1150, the local lord, Gombau d'Oluja, had occupied the site of Vallfogona and had repopulated the area with Christian Catalans. He laid out the town, building a small castle and beginning construction on the town's Romanesque church, both of which still stand. On his death in 1191, Gombau ceded Vallfogona to the Knights Templar. When the Temple was suppressed in 1312, Vallfogona came under control of the Knights Hospitaller. In 1416 the Hospitallers reconstructed much of the church and castle.

Vallfogona's first tourist facility, the Fonda Dolores, opened in 1870 to serve visitors to the spring and its medicinal waters.

During the Spanish Civil War (1936–39), the hotels at the spa served as a hospital for wounded Republican soldiers. About 100 casualties were buried in a mass grave in the cemetery. Three men, all conservatives, were shot by leftist forces at the beginning of the conflict. Eleven soldiers from Vallfogona died in the fighting, all on the Republican side. The Francoist victors did not execute any Vallfogonins, but at least five of them were imprisoned and several had to flee to France. Vallfogona lost nearly 20% of its population.

Vallfogona de Riucorb became part of the Conca de Barberà in the comarcal reorganization of 1990: previously it had formed part of the Segarra.

On July 10, 2010, the newly restored Romanesque sculpture of Saint Peter "dels Vigues" was unveiled; it had been pulled down from the roof of Vallfogona's parish church by anarchists during the Spanish Civil War, and broken up. The restored statue is inside the church, and a copy was made and placed in the statue's original position on the roof above the front door.

== Economy ==
Vallfogona depends economically on agriculture and tourism. It forms part of the officially recognized Costers del Segre wine region; other crops are olives, almonds, wheat, and barley. A spa-hotel complex was constructed in the early 20th century to take advantage of the spring's waters and attract visitors. Today Vallfogona has two hotels and a restaurant. Additionally, it has an attractive public swimming pool-bar open during the summer months, popular among the locals. The forests to the south and southeast of Vallfogona are mostly pine and oak.

== Transportation ==
The village is linked to Guimerà and to Santa Coloma de Queralt by the L-241/T-241/T-224 road. It is served by a twice-daily bus service between Barcelona and Guimerà, and a daily service between Vallfogona and Tàrrega. A track connects Vallfogona with the naturist village of El Fonoll.

== Bibliography ==
- DD. AA. El patrimoni de molins de la demarcació de Tarragona. Anàlisi i estratègies d'intervenció. A càrrec de Jordi Blay Boqué i de Salvador Anton Clavé. Diputació de Tarragona-URV (Col. Ramon Berenguer IV, Sèrie Cultura). Tarragona 2001. p. 681. ISBN 84-95835-04-5. (Catalan).
- Carreras Candi, Francesc. Notes históriques de Vallfogona de Riucorp. [S.l. : s.n., 19--?]. BC, Dip. General 9(4)-8-C 9/4. (Catalan).
- Carreras y Candi, Francisco. Palomas y palomares en Cataluña durante la Edad Media. En: Boletín de la Real Academia de Buenas Letras de Barcelona. V. 1 (1901), p. 201-217. (Spanish).
- Gascón Urís, Sergi. Las filigranas de papel de la encomienda de Vallfogona de Riucorb (Conca de Barberà, prov. Tarragona)(1.ª parte). Actas del IV Congreso Nacional de la Historia del Papel en España, Asociación Hispánica de Historiadores del Papel-Ministerio de Cultura et alii, Córdoba 2001. ISBN 84-95 483-68-8. Pp. 193-216. (Catalan)(Spanish).
- Gascón Urís, Sergi. Las filigranas de papel de la encomienda de Vallfogona de Riucorb (Conca de Barberà, prov. Tarragona)(2.ª parte). Actas del V Congreso Nacional de la Historia del Papel en España, Sarrià de Ter, Asociación Hispánica de Historiadores del Papel-Ministerio de Cultura-Ajuntament de Sarrià de Ter et alii 2003. ISBN 84-95 483-68-8. Pp. 349-376. (Catalan)(Spanish).
- Gascón Urís, Sergi. Las filigranas de papel de la encomienda de Vallfogona de Riucorb (Conca de Barberà, prov. Tarragona)(3.ª y 4.ª partes). Actas del VII Congreso Nacional de la Historia del Papel en España, El Paular-Rascafría, Asociación Hispánica de Historiadores del Papel-Ministerio de Cultura-Ayuntamiento de Rascafría et alii 2007. ISBN 84-95 483-68-8. Pp. 313-390. (Catalan)(Spanish).
- Gascón Urís, Sergi. El "Nomenclàtor oficial de toponímia major de Catalunya" al terme municipal de Vallfogona de Riucorb i d'altres fonts, Societat d'Onomàstica: butlletí interior, 0213-4098, N.º. 106-107, Barcelona 2007, pp. 102-106. (Catalan).
- Gascón Urís, Sergi. Aproximació al nomenclàtor urbà, renoms de casa i creus de pedra de la vila de Vallfogona de Riucorb (Conca de Barberà), International Congress of Onomastic Society-Departament de Cultura (Biblioteca Tècnica de Política Lingüística)-Universitat de Barcelona, Facultat de Filologia, Departament de Filologia Catalana, Barcelona 2011, p. 2979-2999. (Catalan).
- Panareda Clopés, Josep Maria; Rios Calvet, Jaume; Rabella Vives, Josep Maria (1989). Guia de Catalunya, Barcelona: Caixa de Catalunya. ISBN 84-87135-01-3 (Spanish). ISBN 84-87135-02-1 (Catalan).
