= Miquel Roger i Casamada =

Catalan musical composer and producer

Miquel Roger Casamada
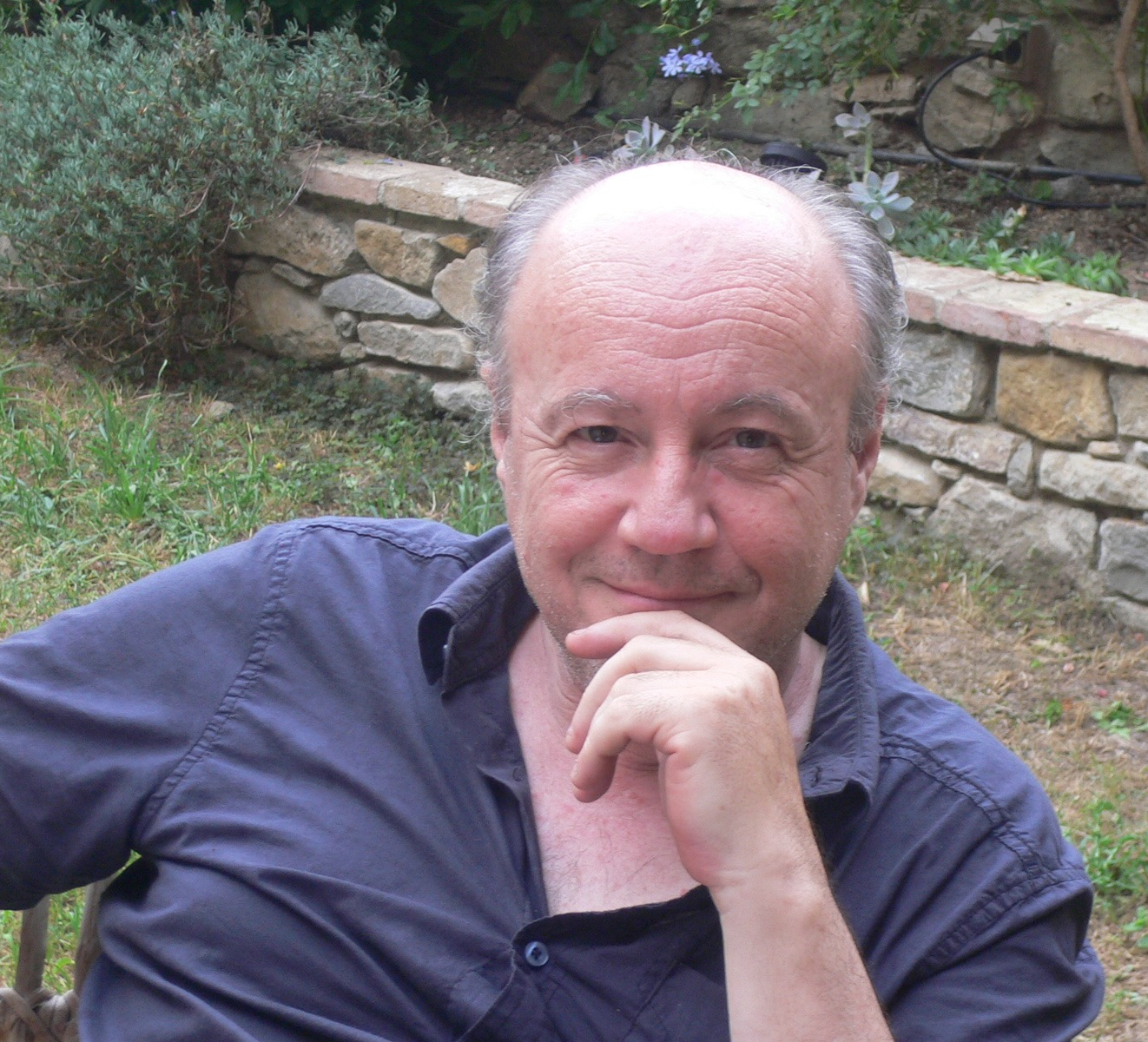
- Born: 16 July 1954; Barcelona
- Died: 24 March 2017 (aged 62); Vilagrassa
- Resting place: Cemetery of Palamós
- Occupations: Composer; Producer; Teacher

Miquel Roger Casamada (16 July 1954 – 24 March 2017) was a Spanish Catalan composer and music producer, who began composing in 1977. He founded the Anacrusi record label and produced several records with soloists, chamber ensembles and orchestras, including the Barcelona Symphony Orchestra and National Orchestra of Catalonia (Orquestra Simfònica de Barcelona i Nacional de Catalunya).

== Biography ==
He was born in Barcelona in 1954, and began his studies at the Municipal Conservatoire of Barcelona (Conservatori Superior Municipal de Música de Barcelona), and subsequently studied with Josep Soler. In 1985 he graduated with a degree in Arts and Philosophy at the University of Barcelona.

His composing career began in 1977 with the performance of his first piece for piano Set de set. His compositions were published by Musikverlag Zimmermann, Boileau and La Ma de Guido. Miquel Roger received commissions from the Asociación Música XXI (1979), the Festival Internacional de Música de Barcelona (1981), the Ajuntament de Badalona (1989), the Associació Catalana de Compositors (1991), and the Centro para la Difusión de la Música Contemporánea (1993).

The recordings of his works are as follows: Triologia (Paris String Trio); Blanca Quartet (Enesco Quartet); Per a la Liliana (in two versions, by the pianist Emili Brugalla and by Montserrat Massaguer); Set de set (by the pianist Assumpta Coma); Quintet de Vent núm. 1 (Harmonia Quintet de Vent);Sis estudis per a clarinet (J. Fuster); Patinnazo (by the flautist Patricia Mazo); his chamber opera Nascita e Apoteosi di Horo (the Chamber Orchestra and choir of the Conservatoire of Badalona conducted by J. Luis Temes).

In 1997 he recorded several of his works for soloists and chamber music with the label Ars Harmónica.

In the 1992–1993 season, the Orquestra Ciutat de Barcelona performed his work Tres Moviments Simfònics, in the summer of 1994 the same orchestra recorded his Concert per a Percussió, Piano i Orquestra, with the soloists Assumpta Coma on piano, and Ignasi Vila on percussion. The conductor was J. Pons.

His chamber opera, Nascita e apoteosi di Horo, won a prize at the First Chamber Opera Competition held by the Spanish National Youth Orchestra.

In 1996 he founded the label Anacrusi, of which he was the managing director and whose main objective was the dissemination of contemporary twentieth and twenty first century music. In 2001, he renovated the old theatre at Jafre (Girona) and turned it into a recording studio under the name l'Auditòrium. As musical producer he was responsible for recordings with soloists and chamber orchestras, including the Orquestra Ciutat de Barcelona and Nacional de Catalunya, Orquesta de Cordoba, Orquesta de Malaga, Orquestra Simfonica d'Euskadi, Orquesta de RTV de España, Orquestra de Cambra d'Andorra, and Tokio Quartet.

He taught musical theory at the Manresa Conservatoire (1982–1986). In 1987 he was appointed head of the music theory department and teacher of counterpoint, music history, aesthetics and composition at the Badalona Conservatoire.

Roger's music has its roots in the Second Viennese School and has developed gradually towards an aesthetic free of academic restraints. At times, the morphological structure of his music displays a markedly contrapuntal mentality which, by its audacity, seems to establish a link with the inquiring spirit of Renaissance polyphony. On the other hand, he occasionally displays a clearly homophonic tendency. His work stands out for the logical structure and austere progression, free of digressions, which he applies to the development of his compositions.

He died in Vilagrassa in 2017, aged 62.

== Discography ==
- Miquel Roger: Obres de Cambra I (Ed. Ars Harmónica)
- Miquel Roger: Obres de Cambra II (Ed. Anacrusi s.l.)
- Miquel Roger: Obres per a piano (Ed. Anacrusi s.l)
- Quartet de corda núm. 2 (Kreuzer Quartet, Ed.Metier,)
- Quartet de corda núm. 4 (Ed. Conservatori de Badalona)
- Peça per a piano, percussió i orquestra (Ed. Fundació Música contemporània)
