= Puigverd =

Puigverd may refer to:

- Puigverd d'Agramunt, a village in Lleida, Catalonia, Spain
- Puigverd de Lleida, a village in Lleida, Catalonia, Spain
