= Rafael de Amat y de Cortada =

Catalan writer (1746–1819)

Rafael de Amat i de Cortada (10 July 1746 – 15 February 1819), popularly known as Baron of Maldà, was a Catalan writer. He wrote a personal diary called Calaix de sastre.
