= Rocafort (disambiguation) =

Rocafort is a town near Valencia, Spain.

"Rocafort" may also refer to:

Places

- Rocafort (Barcelona Metro), railway station
- Rocafort de Queralt, village in Conca de Barberà, Catalonia
- Rocafort de Vallbona, village in Sant Martí de Riucorb municipality, Catalonia
- Rocafort, village in El Pont de Vilomara i Rocafort municipality, Catalonia

People

- Kenneth Rocafort, Puerto Rican illustrator
