= La Fuliola =

- Municipality
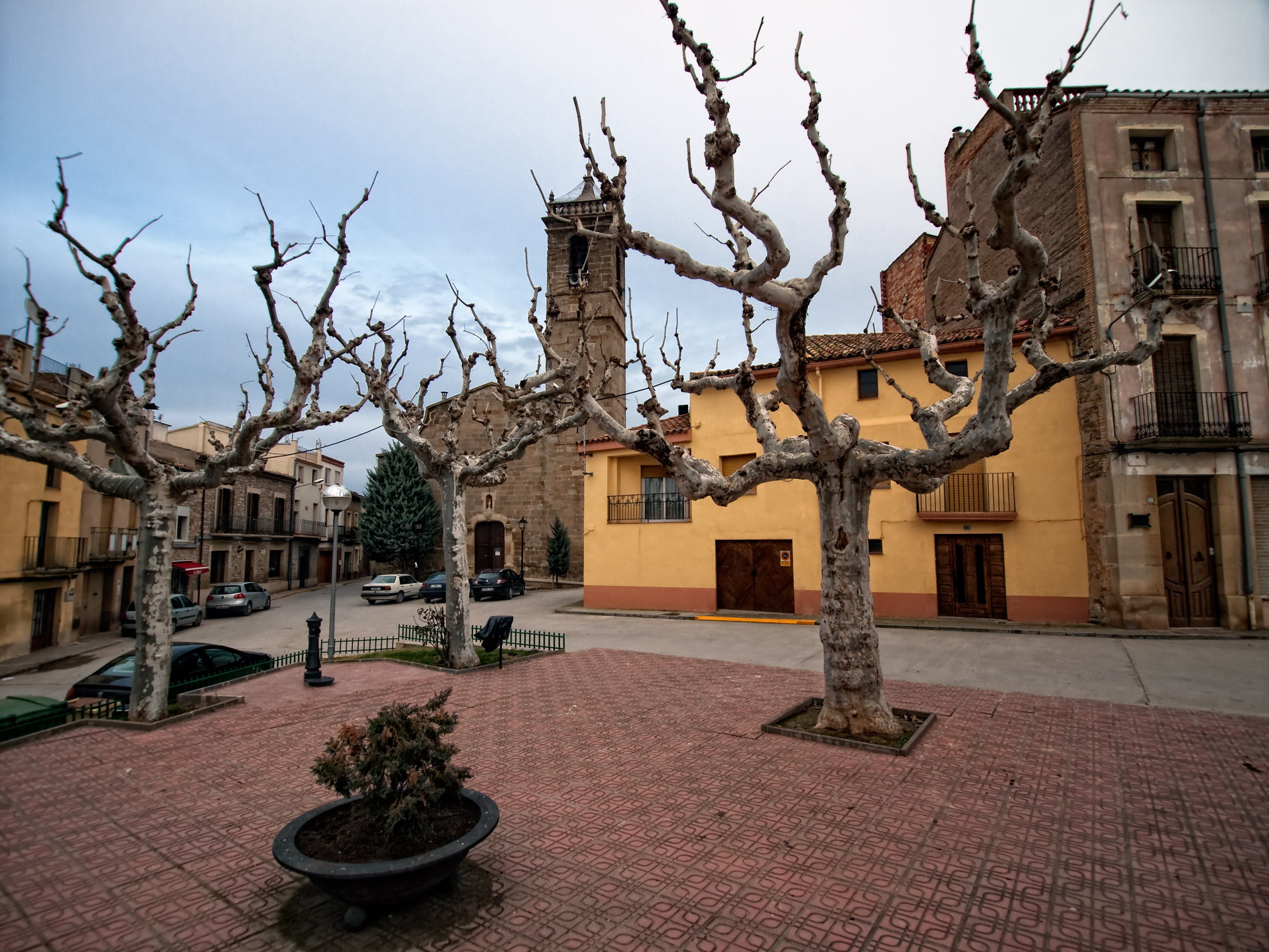
- St. Lucy's church

- Coat of arms

- Location in Catalonia
- Coordinates: 41°43′N 1°1′E
- Country: Spain
- Community: Catalonia
- Province: Lleida
- Comarca: Urgell

Government
  - Mayor: Eduard Piera Secall (2015)

Area
  - Total: 11.0 km^{2} (4.2 sq mi)

Population (2025-01-01)
  - Total: 1,262
  - Density: 115/km^{2} (297/sq mi)
- Website: fuliola.cat

La Fuliola (Catalan pronunciation: [la fuliˈɔlɛ]) is a village in the province of Lleida and autonomous community of Catalonia, Spain. It has a population of 1,262 (register office, 2025).
