= Llorac =

- Municipality
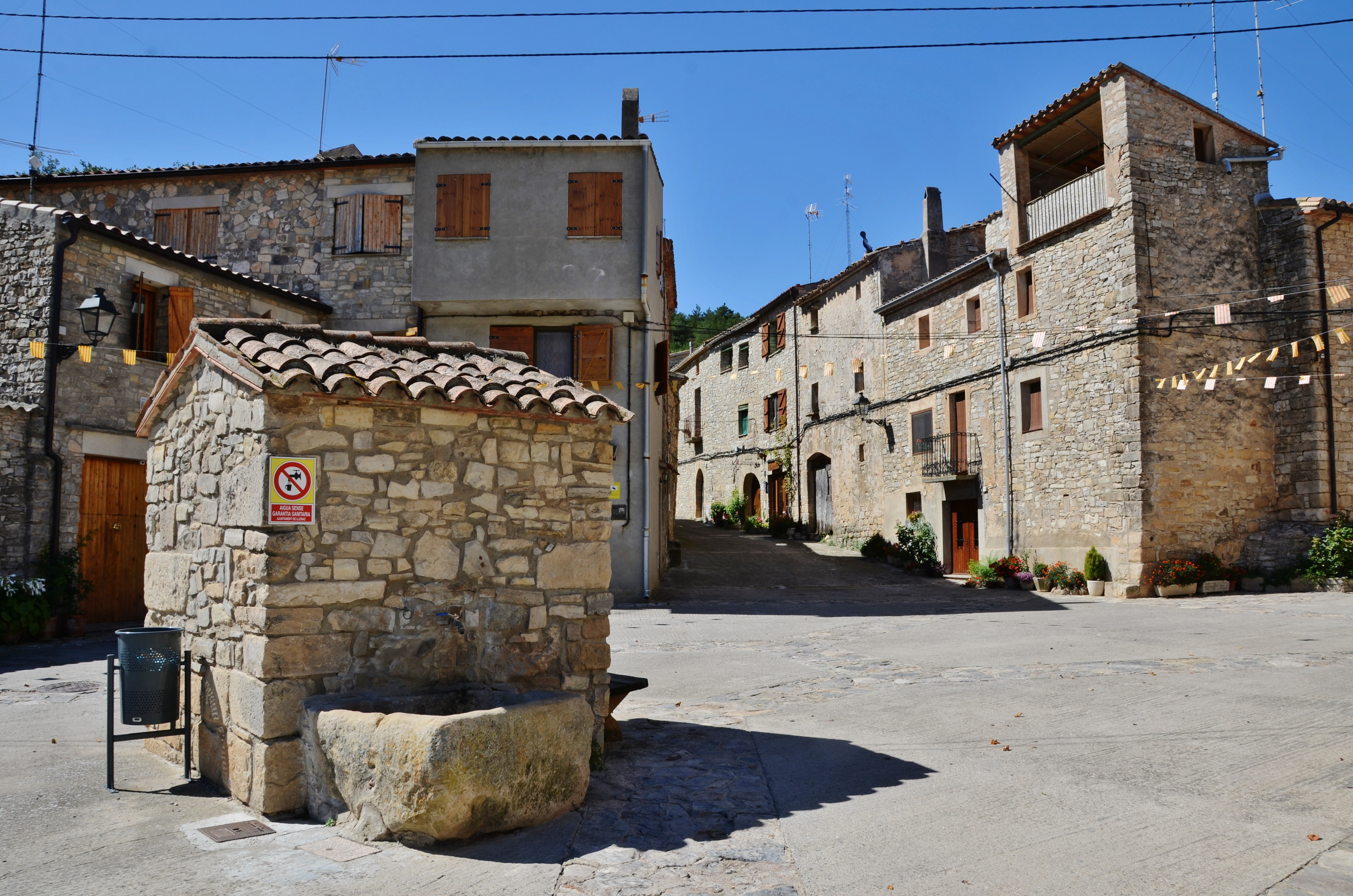

- Flag Coat of arms

- Location in Catalonia
- Coordinates: 41.558°N 1.3083°E
- Country: Spain
- Autonomous community: Catalonia
- Province: Tarragona
- Comarca: Conca de Barberà

Government
  - Mayor: Santiago Trilla Guim (2015)

Area
  - Total: 23.3 km^{2} (9.0 sq mi)

Population (2025-01-01)
  - Total: 105
  - Density: 4.51/km^{2} (11.7/sq mi)
- Time zone: UTC+1 (CET)
  - Summer (DST): UTC+2 (CEST)
- Website: www.llorac.altanet.org

Llorac (Catalan pronunciation: [ʎuˈɾak]) is a rural municipality and village in the comarca of Conca de Barberà in the province of Tarragona in Catalonia, Spain.

The municipality includes the settlements of Llorac, Rauric, La Cirera, Albió, and Montargull. In total it has a population of 105 (register office, 2025).

A twice-daily bus route between Barcelona and Guimerà traverses the municipality.

Economic activity includes the cultivation of cereals, almonds and vines. Garrotxa and other cheeses are produced in Albió.
