= Ossó de Sió =

- Municipality
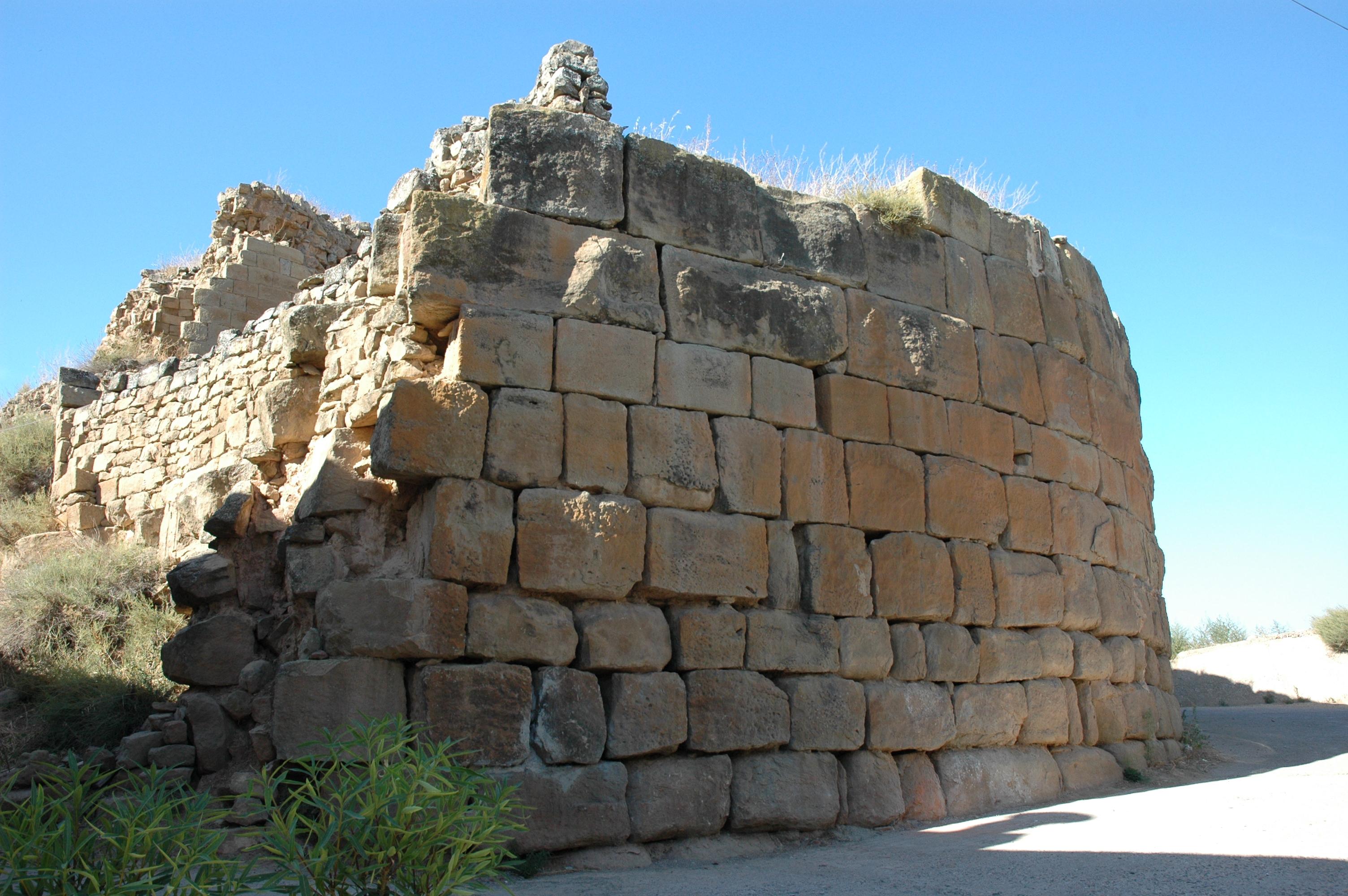
- Castellnou d'Ossó castle

- Coat of arms

- Location in Catalonia
- Coordinates: 41°45′N 1°10′E
- Country: Spain
- Community: Catalonia
- Province: Lleida
- Comarca: Urgell

Government
  - Mayor: Josep Maria Pedró Balagueró (2015)

Area
  - Total: 26.3 km^{2} (10.2 sq mi)

Population (2025-01-01)
  - Total: 198
  - Density: 7.53/km^{2} (19.5/sq mi)
- Climate: Cfa
- Website: ossosio.ddl.net

Ossó de Sió (Catalan pronunciation: [oˈso ðe siˈo]) is a village in the province of Lleida and autonomous community of Catalonia, Spain.

It has a population of 198 (register office, 2025).
