= Guimerà =

- Municipality
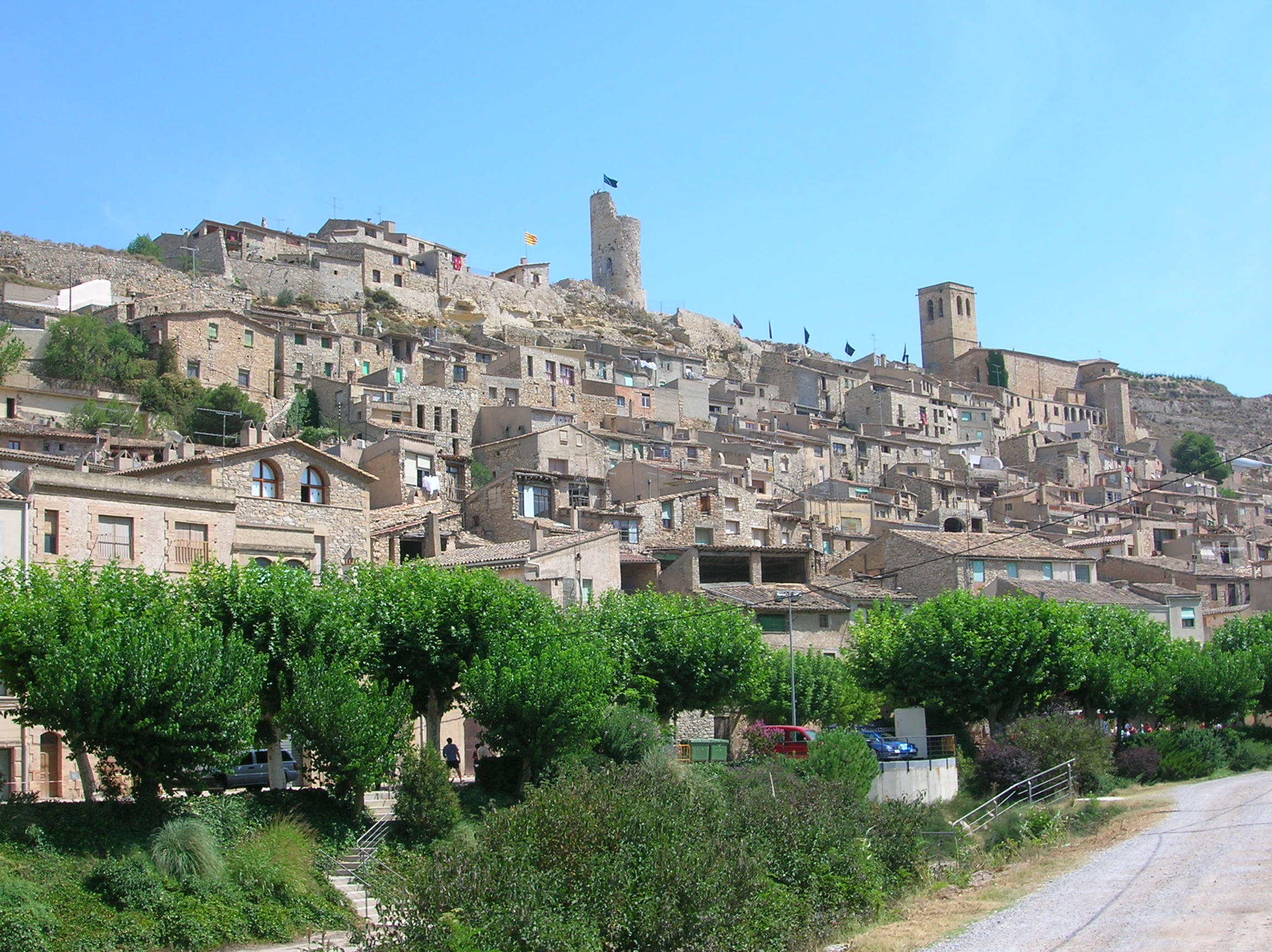

- Coat of arms

- Location in Catalonia
- Coordinates: 41.5645°N 1.1834°E
- Country: Spain
- Autonomous community: Catalonia
- Province: Lleida
- Comarca: Urgell

Government
  - Mayor: Salvador Balcells Busquets (2015) (Convergence and Union)

Area
  - Total: 25.8 km^{2} (10.0 sq mi)
- Elevation: 555 m (1,821 ft)

Population (2025-01-01)
  - Total: 250
  - Density: 9.7/km^{2} (25/sq mi)
- Time zone: UTC+1 (CET)
  - Summer (DST): UTC+2 (CEST)
- Postal code: 25341
- Website: guimera.cat

Guimerà (Catalan pronunciation: [gimeˈɾa]) is a municipality and village in the comarca of Urgell in the province of Lleida in Catalonia, Spain. The village, the only settlement in the municipality, is situated on the banks of the Corb river. The main part of the village is built up a hillside on the north bank of the river. It has a population of 250 (register office, 2025).

== History ==
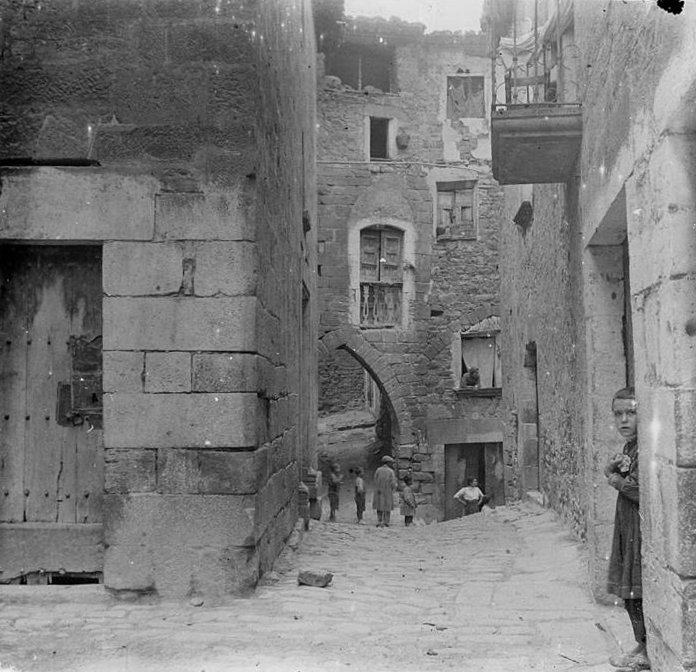
A street in Guimerà, 1916

Guimerà's development originated in the push by Christian forces from the north to recover the Iberian peninsula from Islam. It is believed the village is named after a Visigothic person named something like Wigmar, who may have founded the settlement. Its big castle with a high watchtower indicates its strategic importance. Guimerà's first mention in extant records was in the year 1038, in a legal deed regarding its castle. The town grew downhill from the castle towards the river, and eventually spread to the other bank.

Historical population
Year	Pop.
1497	91
1515	103
1553	128
1717	444
1787	1,246
1830	1,292
1857	1,606
1877	1,488
1887	1,468
1900	1,394
1910	990
1920	1,425
1930	1,255
1940	1,155
1950	1,126
1960	922
1970	660
1981	501
1990	473
1992	421
1994	412
1996	397
1998	375
2000	399
2002	383
2004	361
2006	344
2011	320

Guimerà's population reached a peak of 1606 in 1857, but, in common with the general population decline in the surrounding area, has steadily decreased to 320 in 2011. A large number of the buildings in the village are now holiday homes.

== Economy ==
The main economic activity of Guimerà municipality is dry farming (non-irrigated), principally barley and other cereals, but also olives, almonds and grapes. A local agricultural cooperative produces olive oil under the Garrigues appellation, and wine under the Costers del Segre appellation. Tourism also plays a significant role.

== Main sights ==
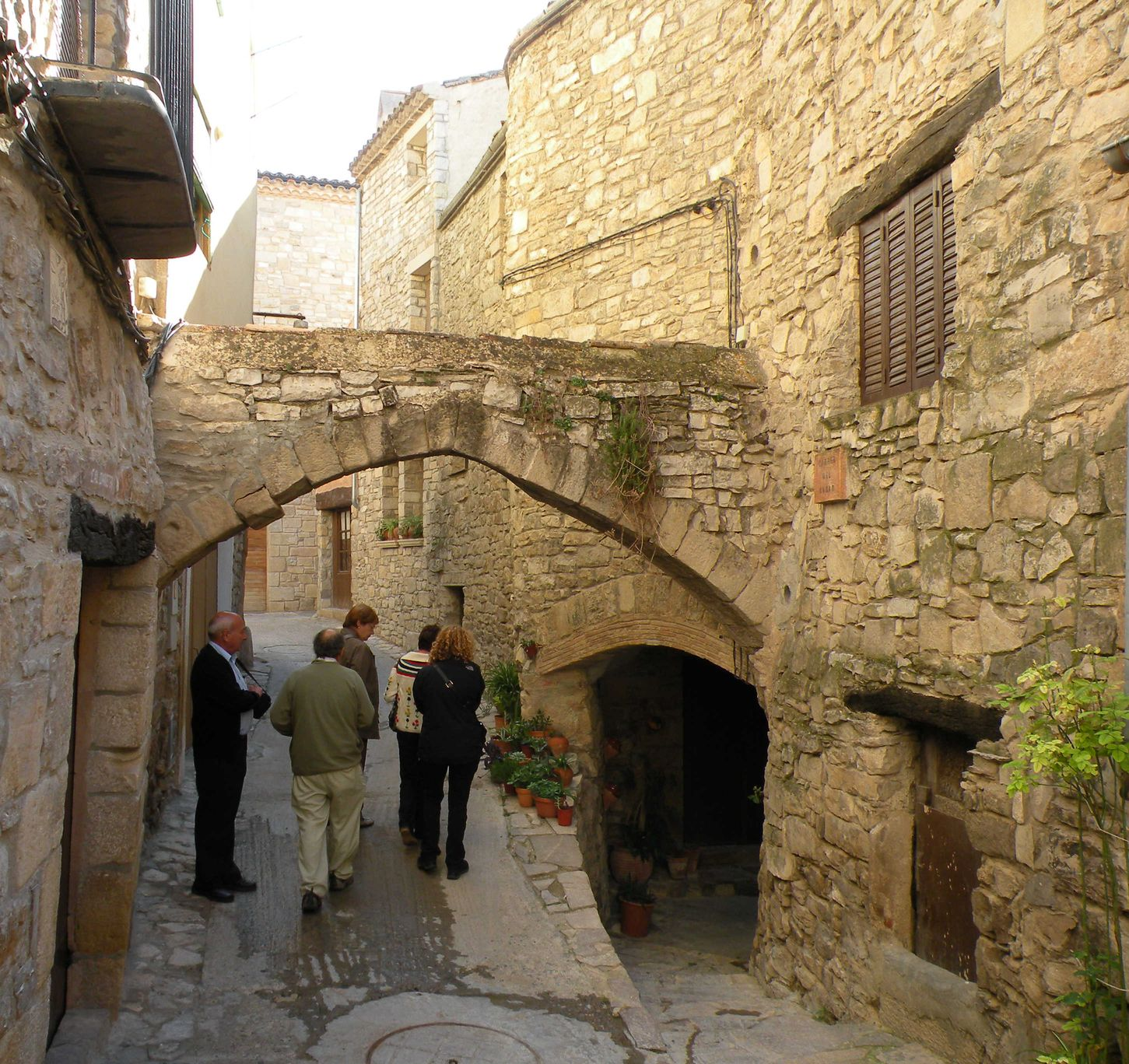
Carrer de la Capella. The tunnel on the right is the start of Carrer del Cacao.

Guimerà is noted for its well-preserved mediaeval layout and limestone buildings, which are densely clustered together on the hillside, linked by narrow streets, stairways, and tunnels. Much of the town wall and several of its gates still remain.

The castle, in a commanding position overlooking the village, dates from the 11th century. It was largely destroyed during a battle of the First Carlist War in 1835. Since 1984, large parts of the castle have undergone restoration. The castle's restored watchtower is now open to the public.

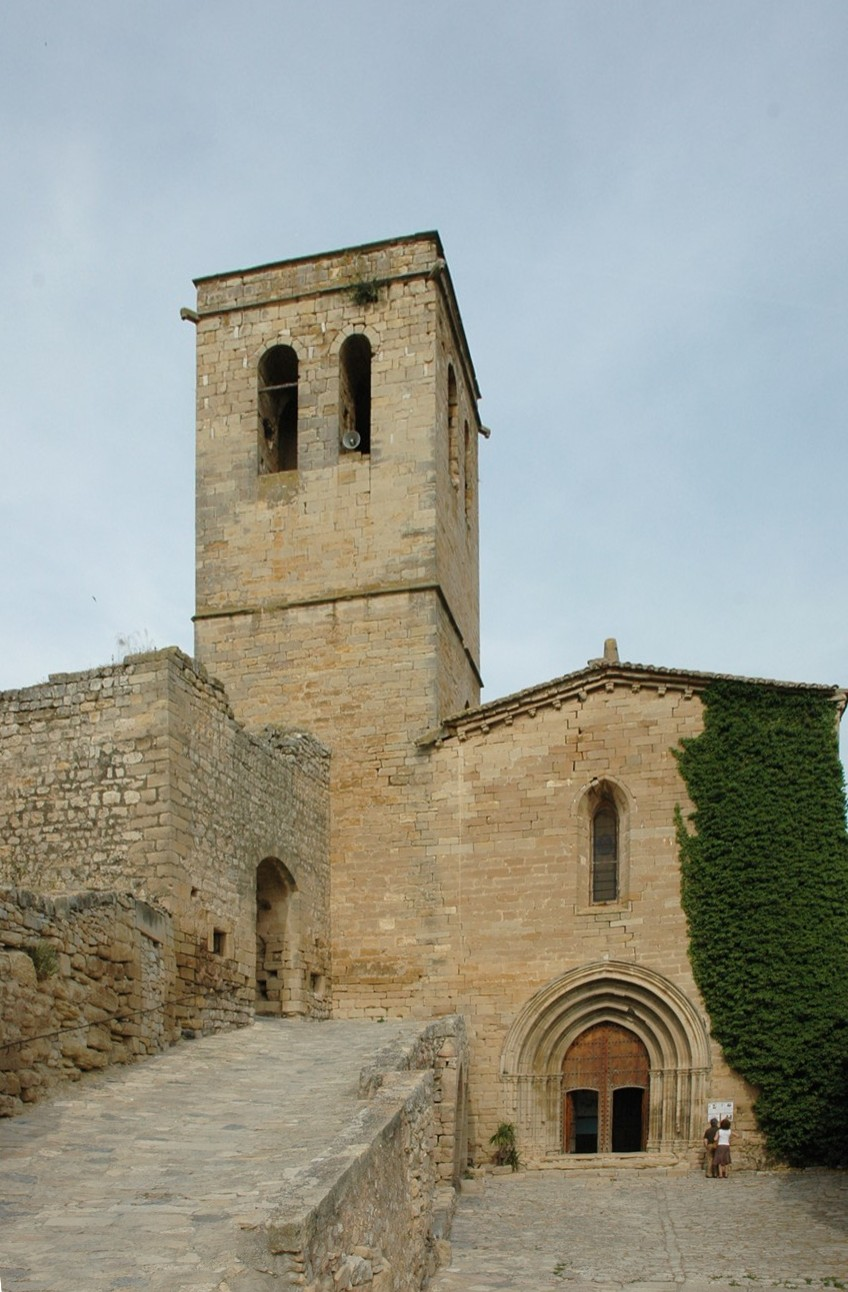
Santa Maria de Guimerà parish church, with at left, one of the town wall's gates.

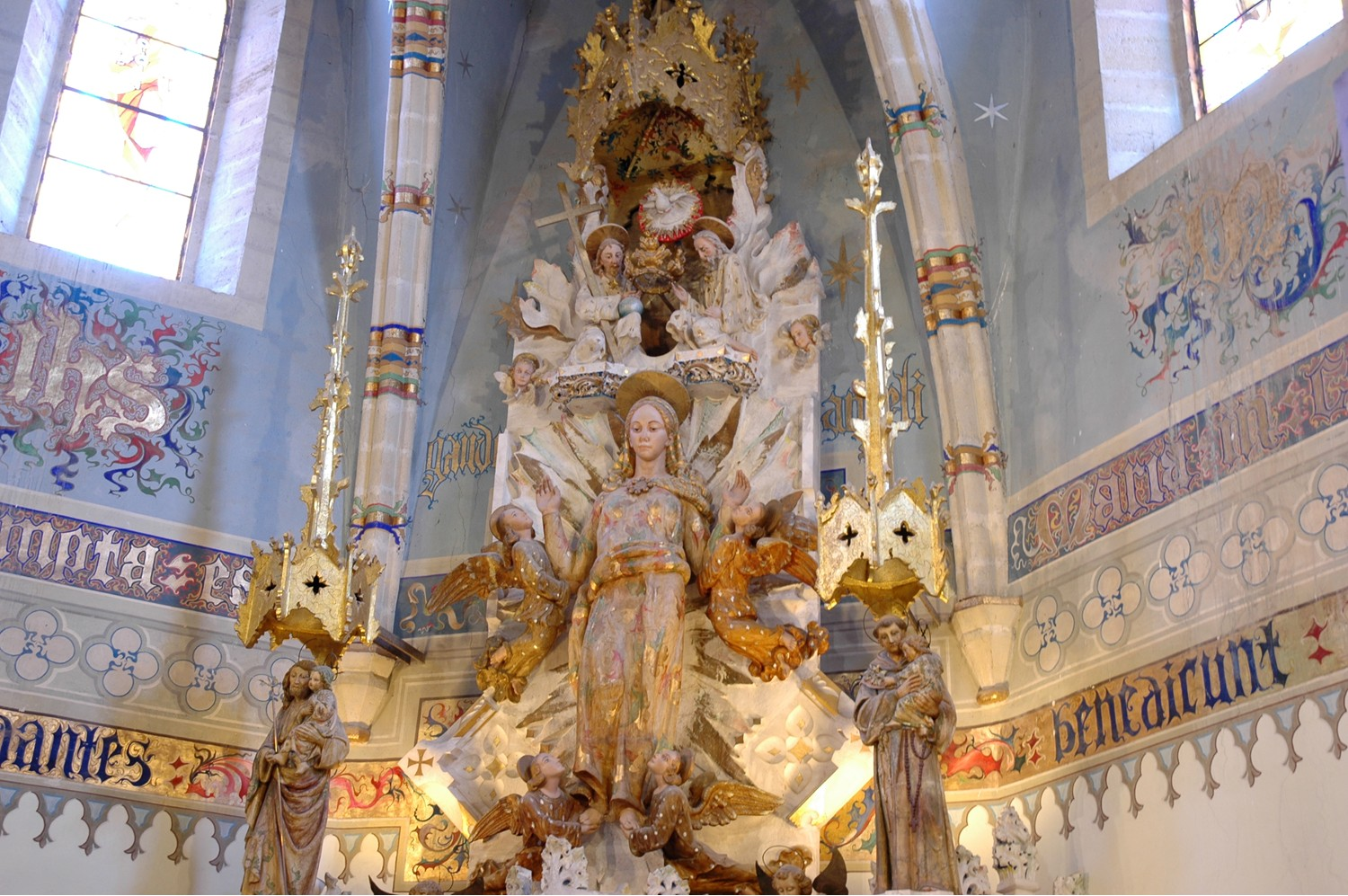
Jujol's altarpiece in the parish church.

The parish church of St. Mary, a large building beside the castle, dating from the 14th century, is the most notable extant building. Historically, it contained an elaborate altarpiece painted by Ramon de Mur in the early 15th century, but this artwork is now found in the Episcopal Museum of Vic. In 1940 a new altarpiece was created by the architect Josep Maria Jujol.

Located 2 km west of the village stands the religious sanctuary of La Bovera, dating from the 13th century, which is still in active use.

The ruined convent of Vallsanta is located 1.5 km west of Guimerà village, close to La Bovera. It was founded by Cistercian nuns who moved from their previous site at La Bovera in the 13th century. It was abandoned around the year 1600. It contains a variety of architectural styles from the Romanesque and Gothic periods.

In 1975, the Spanish Government registered the historic centre of Guimerà as a protected national monument, followed by its castle in 1988. The list of architectural heritage monuments maintained by the Generalitat of Catalonia (government) contains 24 structures in Guimerà village and municipality.

== Culture ==
Guimerà's mediaeval main square contains the town's museum, which houses many local artifacts from the times of the pre-Roman Iberians, the Roman Empire, and mediaeval times. The village's major annual festival is that of its patron saint, St. Sebastian, on the weekend nearest to 20 January, his feast day. Since 1994, the annual mediaeval fair held in August has attracted many visitors.

== Transportation ==
Guimerà is the biggest and westernmost settlement on the 23-km-long L-241/T-241/T-224 road which follows the Corb river from Santa Coloma de Queralt to the Tàrrega–Montblanc highway. The spa resort of Vallfogona de Riucorb is 5 km to the east. The road is served by a twice-daily bus service between Barcelona and its terminus at Guimerà, and a daily service between Vallfogona and Tàrrega. Tàrrega, 15 km away, is the closest town, railway station, and motorway access.
