= Castellserà =

- Municipality
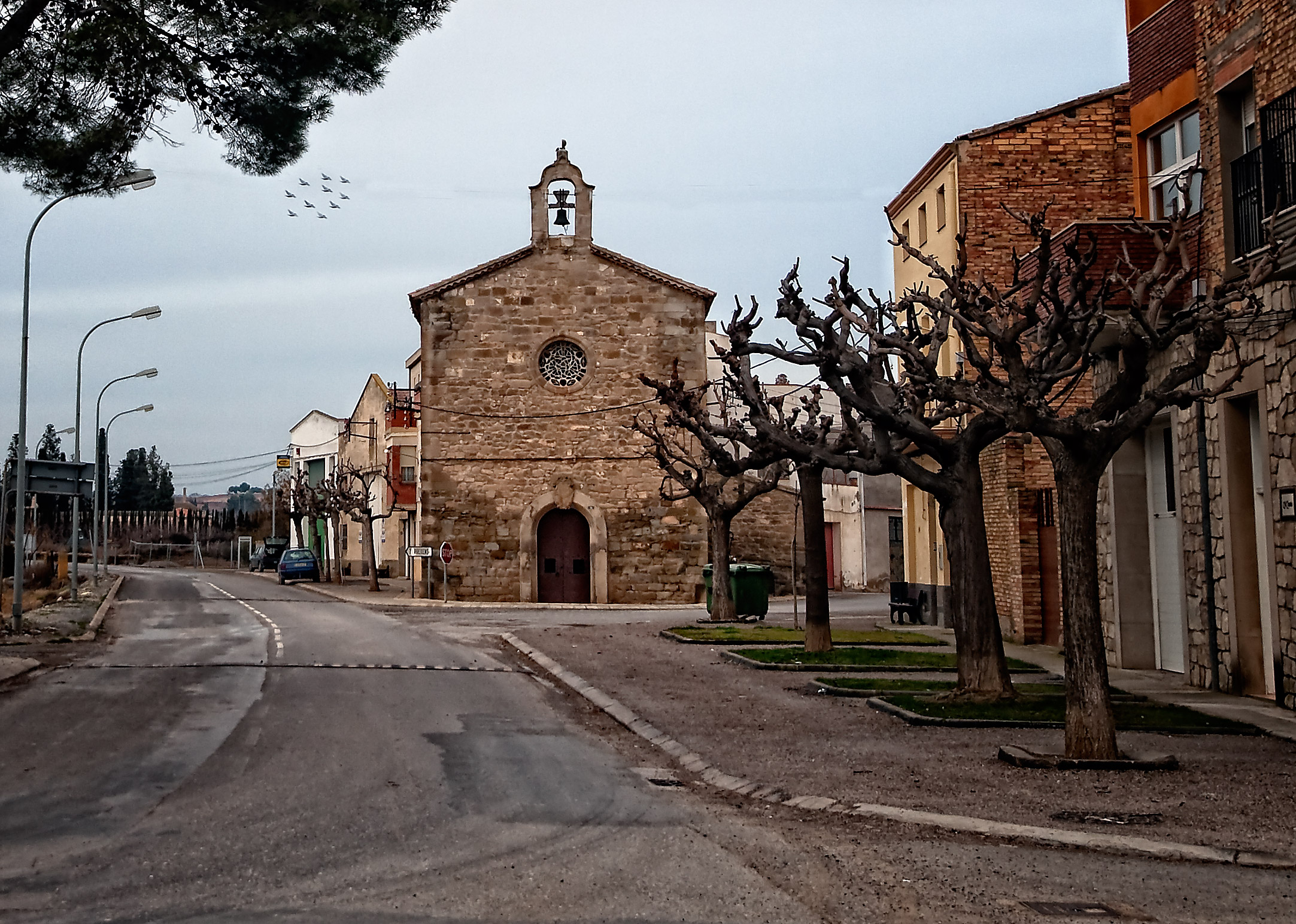
- Ermita de Sant Sebastià

- Flag Coat of arms

- Location in Catalonia
- Coordinates: 41°45′N 0°59′E
- Country: Spain
- Community: Catalonia
- Province: Lleida
- Comarca: Urgell

Government
  - Mayor: Marcel Pujol Coll (2015)

Area
  - Total: 15.8 km^{2} (6.1 sq mi)

Population (2025-01-01)
  - Total: 993
  - Density: 62.8/km^{2} (163/sq mi)
- Website: castellsera.cat

Castellserà (Catalan pronunciation: [kasˌteʎ.seˈɾa]) is a village in the province of Lleida and autonomous community of Catalonia, Spain. It has a population of 993 (register office, 2025).
