= Anglesola =

- Municipality
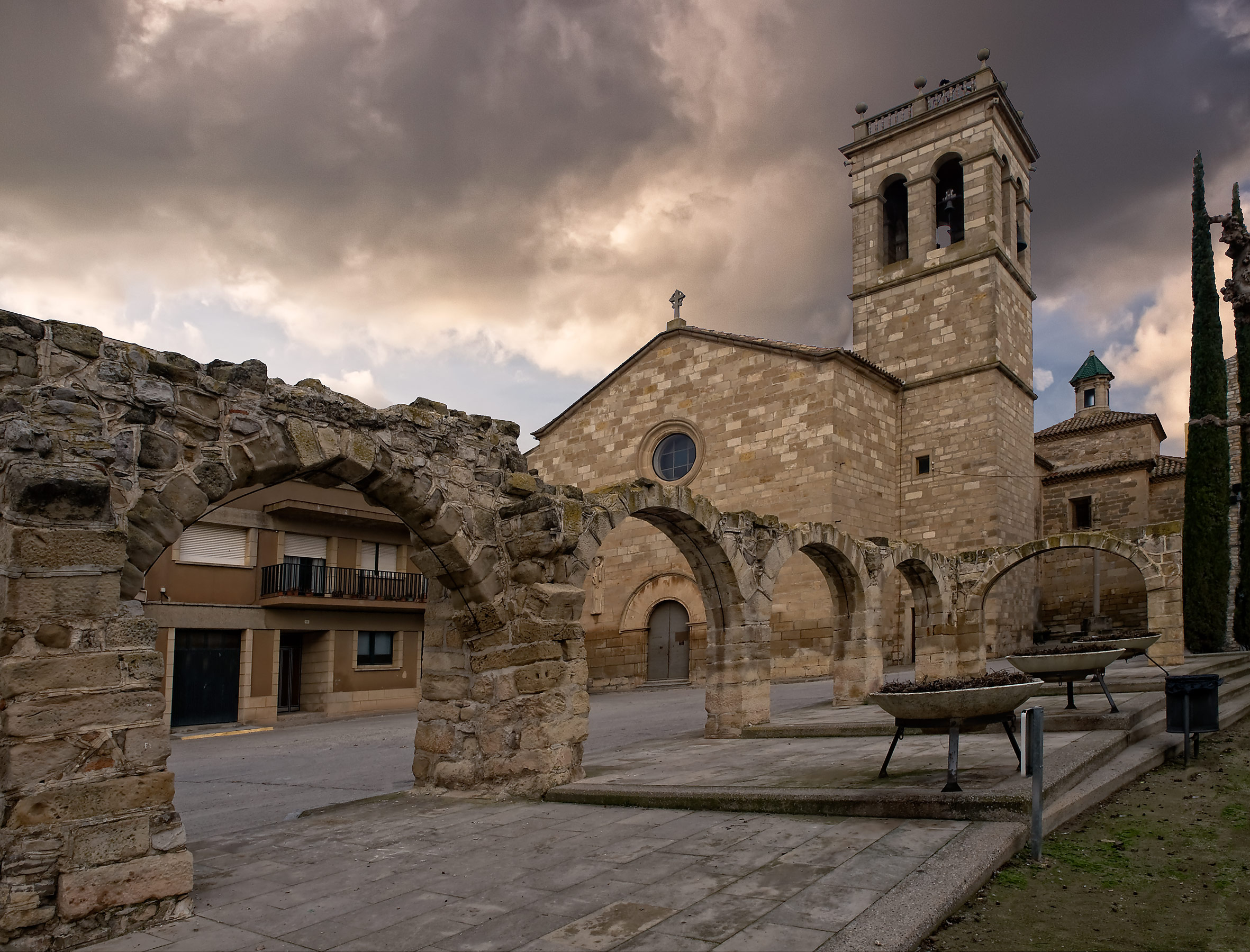
- Plaça de l'Església, Anglesola

- Coat of arms

- Location in Catalonia
- Coordinates: 41°39′N 1°5′E
- Country: ESP
- Comarca: Urgell
- Autonomous Community: Catalonia
- Province: Lleida

Government
  - mayor: Carme Miró

Area
  - Total: 23.5 km^{2} (9.1 sq mi)
- Elevation: 335 m (1,099 ft)

Population (2025-01-01)
  - Total: 1,389
  - Density: 59.1/km^{2} (153/sq mi)
- Postal code: 25320
- Climate: Cfa
- Website: anglesola.cat

Anglesola (Catalan: [əŋɡləˈzɔlə], locally [aŋɡleˈzɔlɛ]) is a village in the province of Lleida and autonomous community of Catalonia, Spain.

== Demographics ==
It has a population of 1,389 (register office, 2025).

== History ==
Anglesola was first mentioned in 1079, in a document in which Ramón Berenguer II and Berenguer Ramón II ceded the lands to Berenguer Gombau for its repopulation. It became the center of the barony of Anglesola, decisive in the Catalan reconquest. The lineage of the barony took the name of the castle. From the twelfth century, it was divided into three branches: the Lords of Vallbona, Lords of Bellpuig and Lords of Anglesola. In 1097, the church in the village was cited for the first time. Sancha, widow of Berenguer Gombau, gave the temple to the Solsona clergy. In 1139, Anglesola had a hospital for the poor, founded by Arnau Berenguer of Anglesola and directed by the abbot of the Poblet monastery.

The Anglesola lineage became extinct in 1382 and Martin I gave the barony to Pere of Benviure, a protege of Queen Maria de Luna. Later it passed to the Erills, whose lineage disappeared in 1475. Finally, it ended in the hands of the counts of Perelada, who had the lordship until the end of the old regime.

== Culture ==
There are no remains of the castle nor of the primitive church. The present parish church is dedicated to St. Paul of Narbonne and is believed to have been built in the same place where the original was. It is from the fifteenth century, with a single nave and a lateral and choir aisles. The cover is made of a combination of vaults and edge alongside the barrel vaults. This mixture of styles is present in other fifteenth century Catalan buildings. The bell tower, a square, is attached to the walls. The top is closed with a balustrade.

On each side of the entrance, there are two Romanesque images representing Saint Peter and Saint Paul. Both are dated in the twelfth century and are the work of Ramon de Bianya. In the fourteenth century a stone altar was added to the church dedicated to the Virgin which is kept in a museum in Boston. In the temple there is also a fifteenth-century altarpiece dedicated to Santa Ana originating from a chapel that was in the ancient gateway city. There is also a polychrome stone carving from the fourteenth century which depicts St. Paul.

== Economy ==
The main economic activity is agriculture. Primarily fruit crops are cultivated, mainly apples and pears, but there are dry crops.

The village has an industrial estate that in 2007 was home to twelve companies.
