= Preixana =

- Municipality
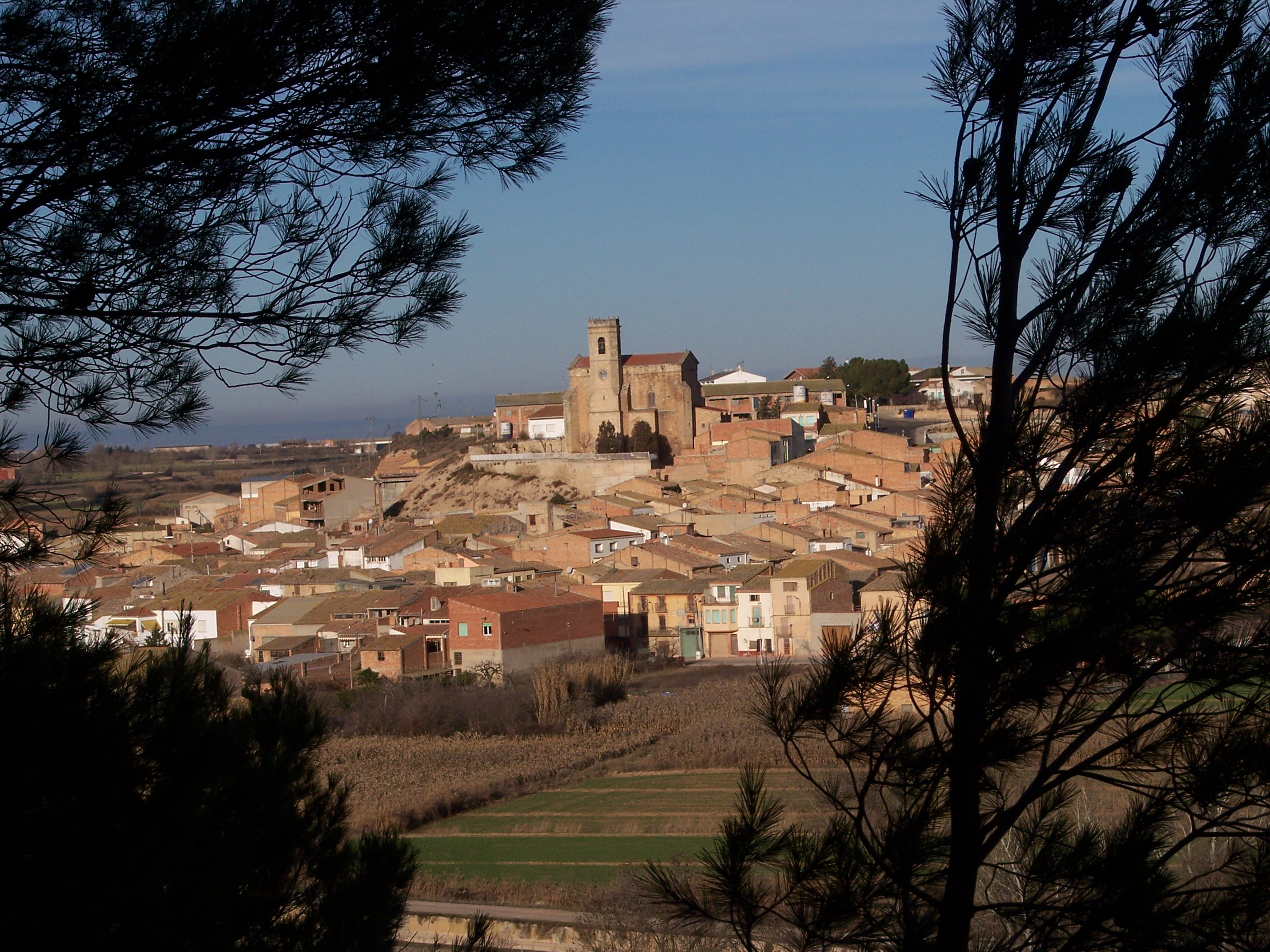
- Preixana

- Flag Coat of arms

- Location in Catalonia
- Coordinates: 41°36′N 1°2′E
- Country: Spain
- Community: Catalonia
- Province: Lleida
- Comarca: Urgell

Government
  - Mayor: Jaume Pane Roig (2015)

Area
  - Total: 21.5 km^{2} (8.3 sq mi)

Population (2025-01-01)
  - Total: 401
  - Density: 18.7/km^{2} (48.3/sq mi)
- Website: preixana.cat

Preixana (Catalan pronunciation: [pɾejˈʃanɛ]) is a village in the province of Lleida and autonomous community of Catalonia, Spain.

It has a population of 401 (register office, 2025).
