= Ciutadilla =

- Municipality
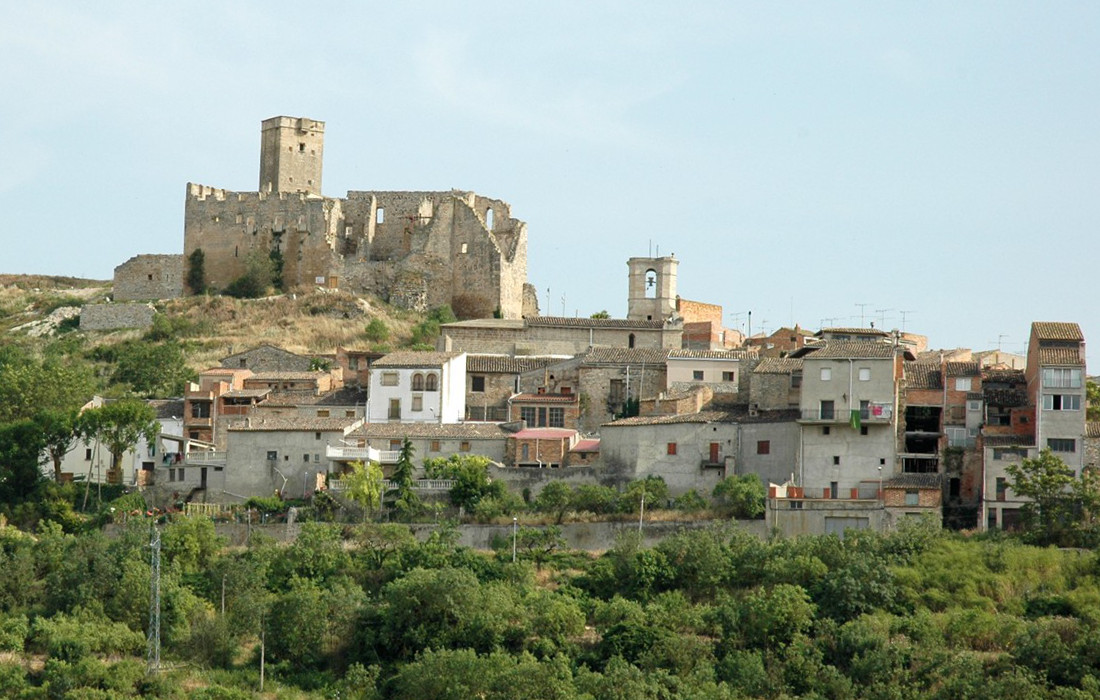

- Flag Coat of arms

- Location in Catalonia
- Coordinates: 41.56110°N 1.13976°E
- Country: Spain
- Autonomous community: Catalonia
- Province: Lleida
- Comarca: Urgell

Government
  - mayor: Óscar Martínez Agustí (2015)

Area
  - Total: 17.0 km^{2} (6.6 sq mi)
- Elevation: 519 m (1,703 ft)

Population (2025-01-01)
  - Total: 186
  - Density: 10.9/km^{2} (28.3/sq mi)
- Time zone: UTC+1 (CET)
  - Summer (DST): UTC+2 (CEST)
- Postal code: 25341
- Website: www.ciutadilla.cat

Ciutadilla (Catalan pronunciation: [siwtaˈðiʎa]) is a village and municipality in the comarca of Urgell in Catalonia, Spain. It has a population of 186 (register office, 2025).

The village, the only settlement in the municipality, is situated on a hill close to where the Montblanc-to-Tàrrega highway crosses the Corb river. Its ruined castle occupies a commanding position overlooking not just the village but also the plains of Urgell and Segarra. Many of the buildings in the village serve as holiday homes.

== Economy ==
The municipality's economy depends largely on agriculture, mainly non-irrigated barley and other grains, vines, olives, and almonds, as well as pig- and poultry-farming.

== History ==
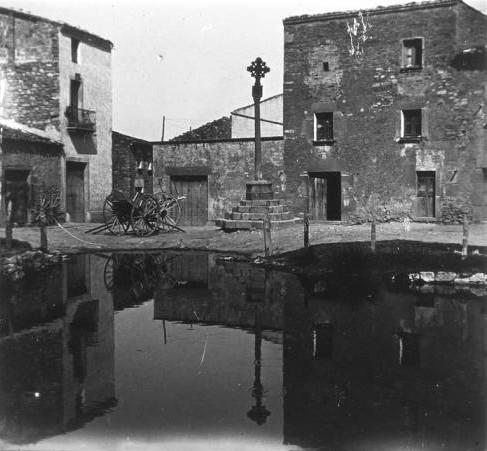
Ciutadilla in 1914

Ciutadilla village developed around its castle, and spread downhill. The castle is mentioned in extant 12th-century documents, and was significantly improved in the 16th century. It was badly damaged during the First Carlist War in 1835, and fell into ruins after that. The municipality's population reached a peak of 872 in 1887, but has since steadily declined with the rest of the region to 209 in 2013. Many archaeological remains from the Iberic, Greek and Roman periods have been found in the municipality.

== Culture ==
The main festivals in Ciutadilla are that of Saint Roch on the second weekend of August, and its patron saint Saint Michael on 29 September.
