= Puigverd d'Agramunt =

- Municipality
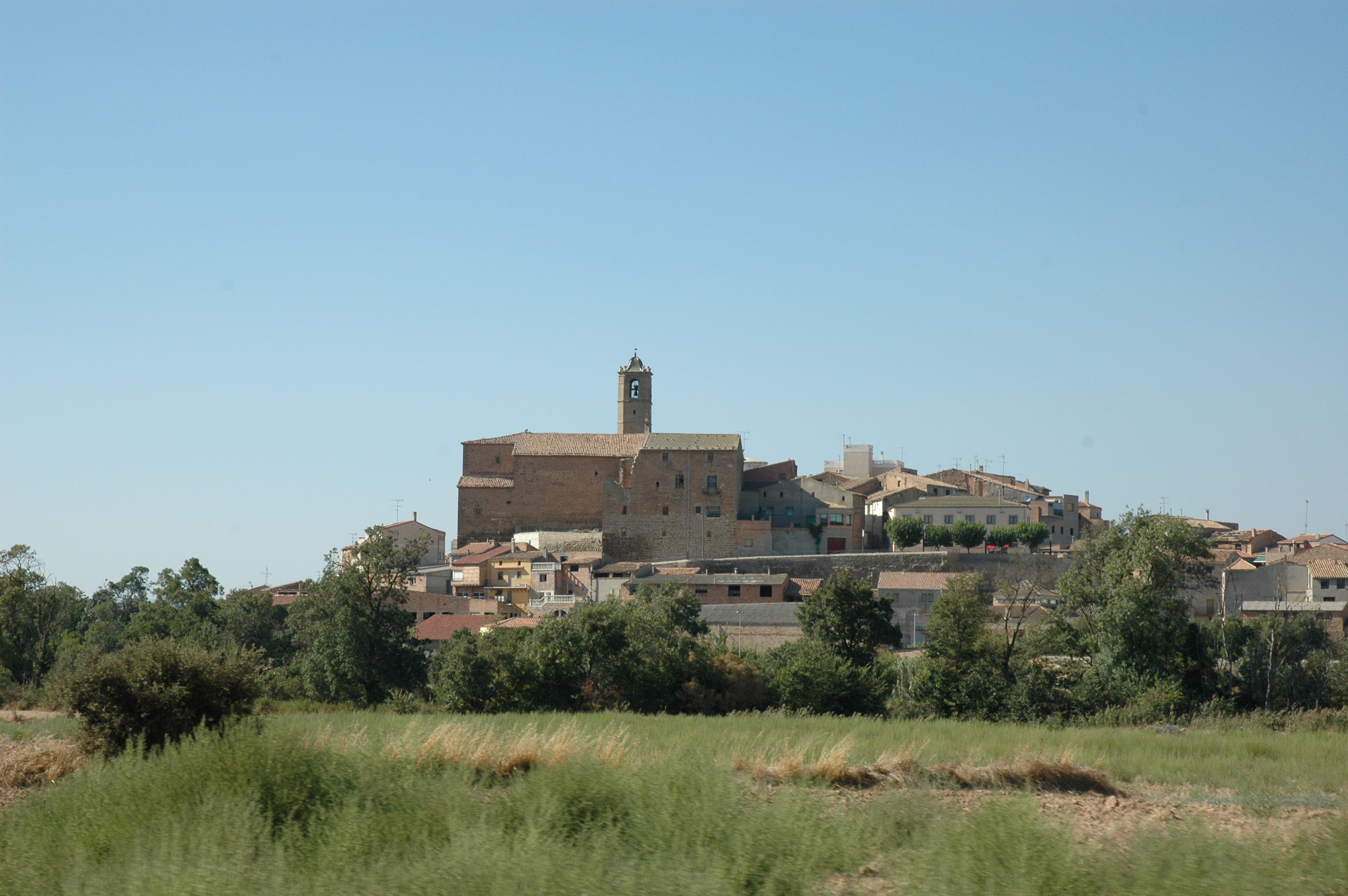

- Coat of arms

- Location in Catalonia
- Coordinates: 41°46′47″N 1°7′24″E
- Country: Spain
- Community: Catalonia
- Province: Lleida
- Comarca: Urgell

Government
  - Mayor: Joan Eroles Samarra (2015)

Area
  - Total: 17.0 km^{2} (6.6 sq mi)

Population (2025-01-01)
  - Total: 231
  - Density: 13.6/km^{2} (35.2/sq mi)
- Climate: Cfa
- Website: puigverdagramunt.ddl.net

Puigverd d'Agramunt (Catalan pronunciation: [pudʒˈβɛɾd daɣɾaˈmun]) is a village in the province of Lleida and autonomous community of Catalonia, Spain.

It has a population of 231 (register office, 2025).
