= Vilagrassa =

- Municipality
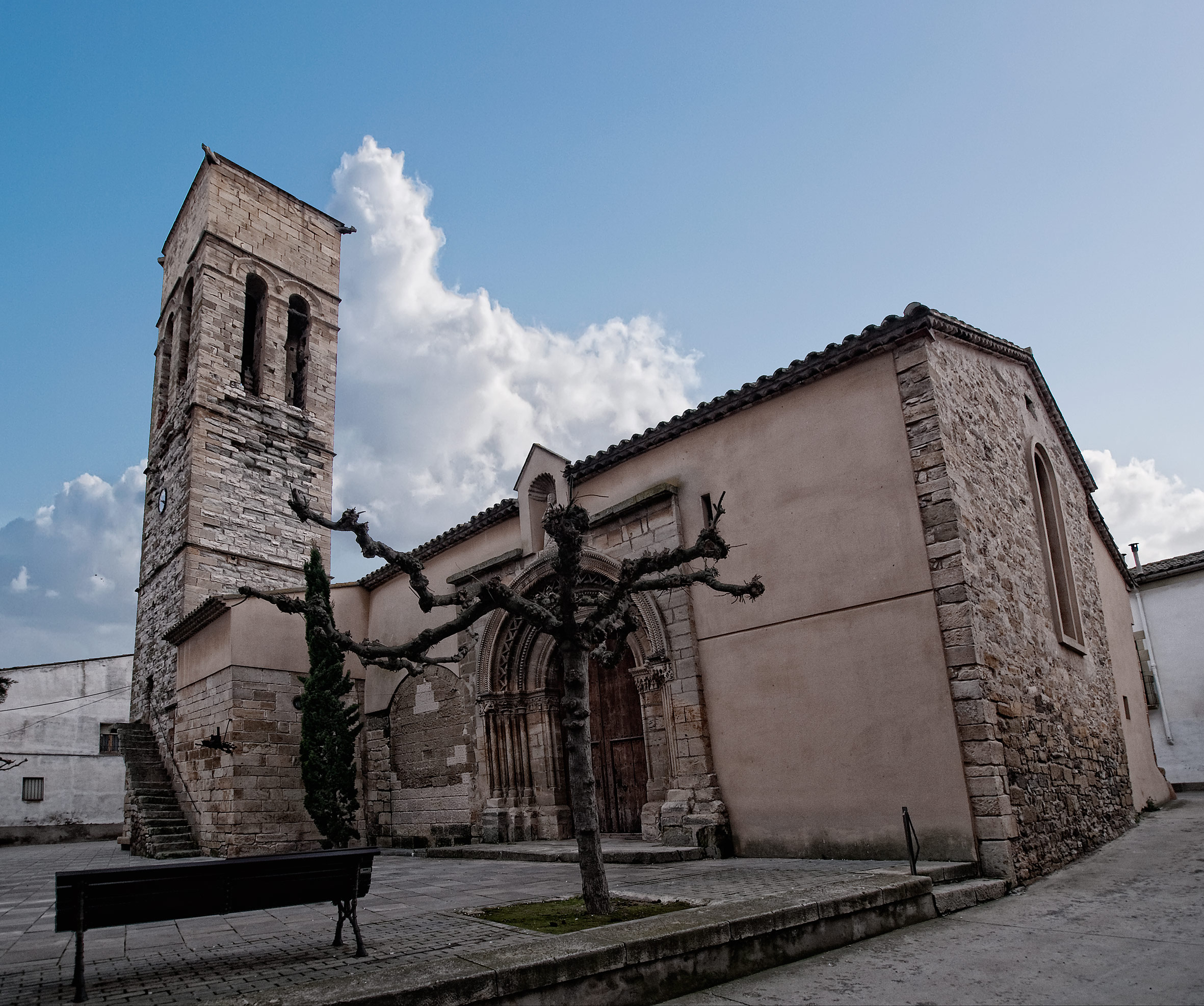
- St. Mary's church

- Flag Coat of arms

- Location in Catalonia
- Coordinates: 41°39′1″N 1°6′24″E
- Country: Spain
- Community: Catalonia
- Province: Lleida
- Comarca: Urgell

Government
  - Mayor: Jordi Serés Aguilar (2015)

Area
  - Total: 19.9 km^{2} (7.7 sq mi)

Population (2025-01-01)
  - Total: 627
  - Density: 31.5/km^{2} (81.6/sq mi)
- Climate: Cfa
- Website: vilagrassa.cat

Vilagrassa (Catalan pronunciation: [ˌbilaˈɣɾasa]) is a village in the province of Lleida and autonomous community of Catalonia, Spain.

It has a population of 627 (register office, 2025).
