= Belianes =

- Municipality
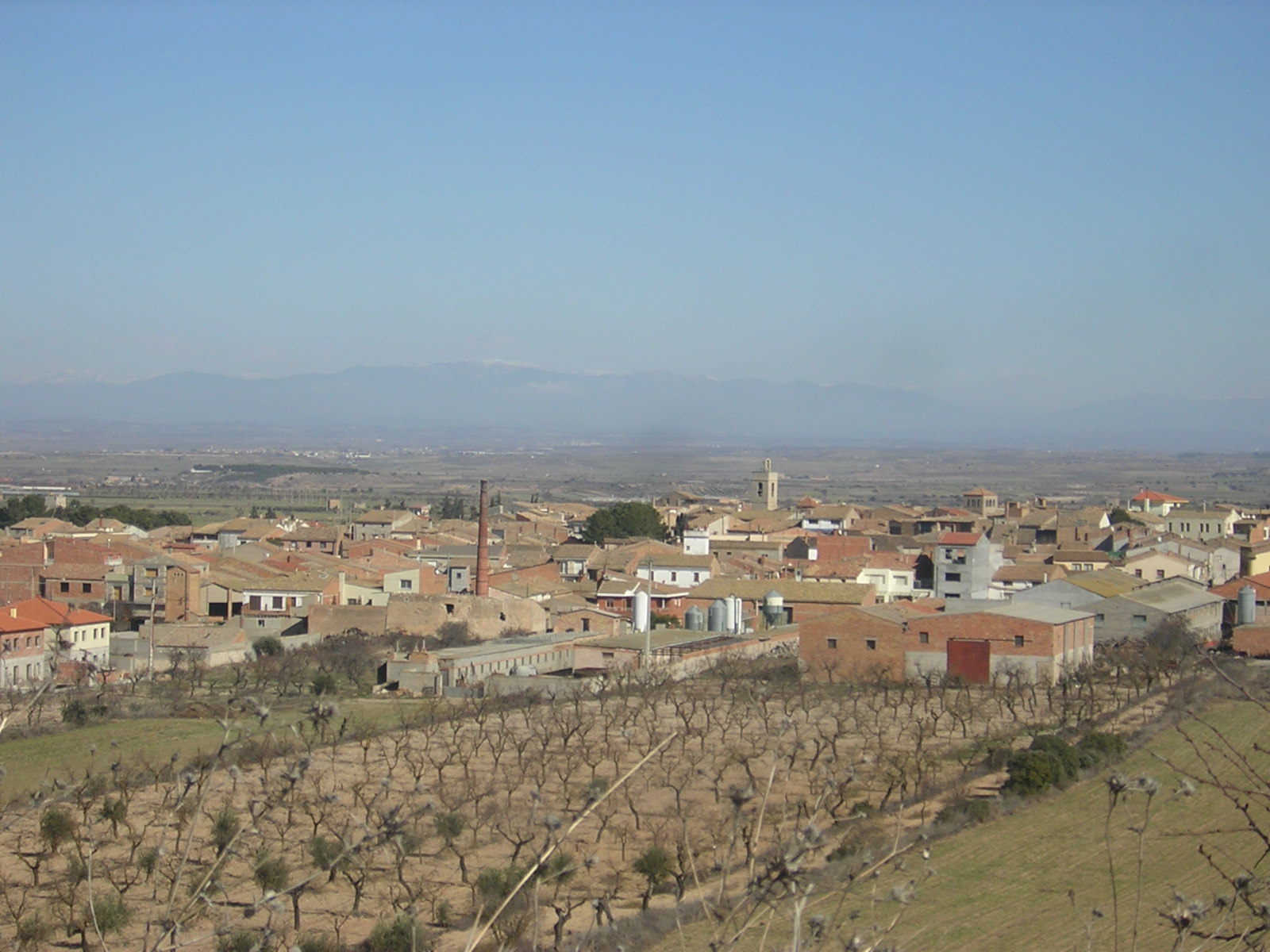
- Belianes

- Flag Coat of arms

- Location in Catalonia
- Coordinates: 41°34′N 1°1′E
- Country: Spain
- Community: Catalonia
- Province: Lleida
- Comarca: Urgell

Government
  - Mayor: Jose Ramon Morera Timoneda (2015)

Area
  - Total: 15.7 km^{2} (6.1 sq mi)

Population (2025-01-01)
  - Total: 514
  - Density: 32.7/km^{2} (84.8/sq mi)
- Website: belianes.cat

Belianes (Catalan pronunciation: [beliˈanes]) is a village in the province of Lleida and autonomous community of Catalonia, Spain.

It has a population of 514 (register office, 2025).
