= Nalec =

- Municipality
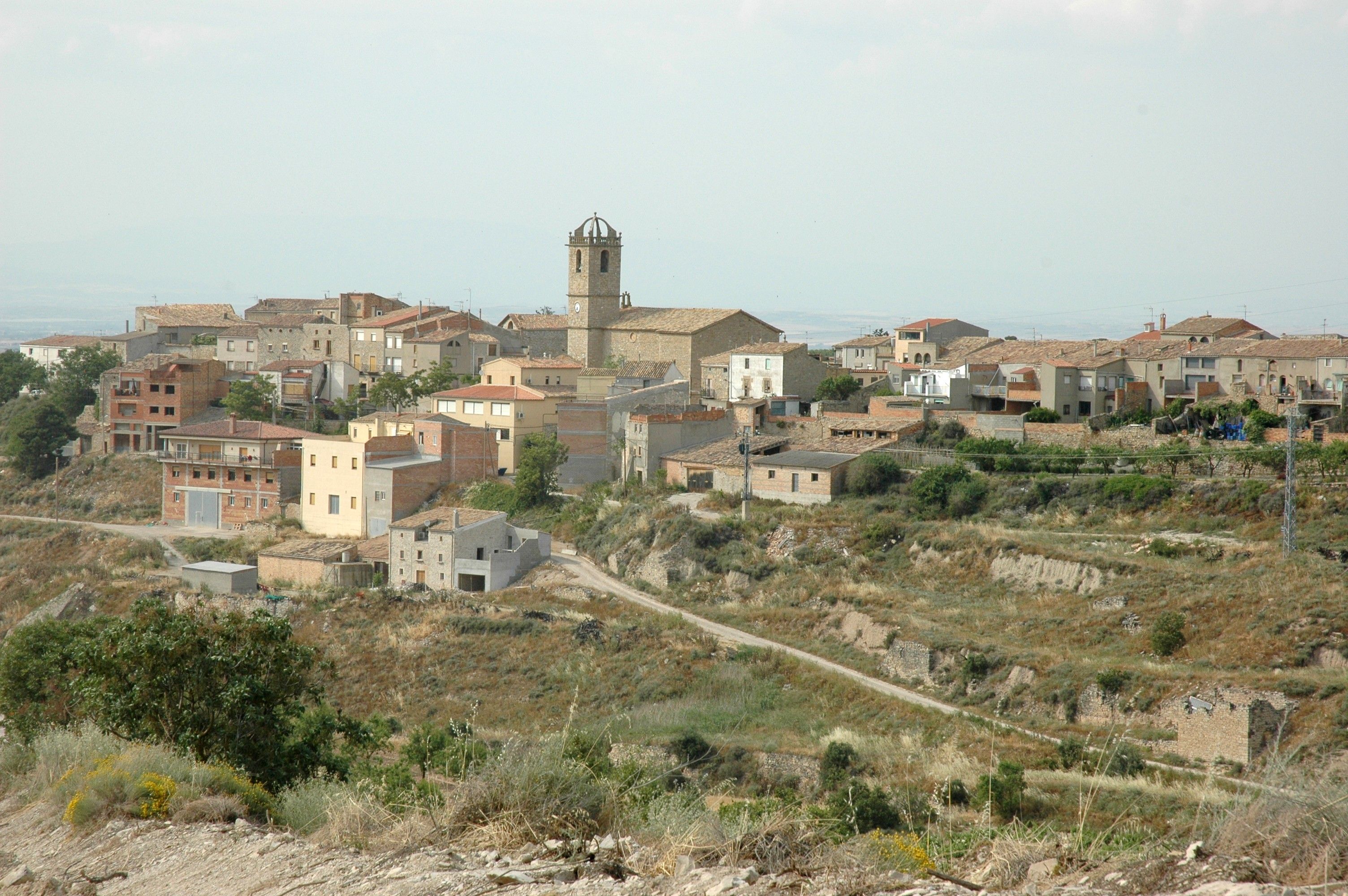

- Coat of arms

- Location in Catalonia
- Coordinates: 41°33′42″N 1°06′59″E
- Country: Spain
- Community: Catalonia
- Province: Lleida
- Comarca: Urgell

Government
  - Mayor: Laura Piera Cuadras (2015)

Area
  - Total: 9.2 km^{2} (3.6 sq mi)
- Elevation: 487 m (1,598 ft)

Population (2025-01-01)
  - Total: 91
  - Density: 9.9/km^{2} (26/sq mi)
- Website: nalec.cat

Nalec (Catalan pronunciation: [naˈlek]) is a municipality in the comarca of the Urgell in Catalonia, Spain. It is situated in the valley of the Corb in the south of the comarca.

== Demography ==
It has a population of 91 (register office, 2025).

1900	1930	1950	1970	1986	2007
474	419	345	148	107	95
