= Urgell =

Coordinates: 41°39′44″N 1°05′09″E

- Comarca
- Flag Coat of arms

- Country: Spain
- Autonomous community: Catalonia
- Region: Ponent
- Province: Lleida
- Capital: Tàrrega
- Municipalities: List: Agramunt, Anglesola, Belianes, Bellpuig, Castellserà, Ciutadilla, La Fuliola, Guimerà, Maldà, Nalec, Els Omells de na Gaia, Ossó de Sió, Preixana, Puigverd d'Agramunt, Sant Martí de Riucorb, Tornabous, Tàrrega, Vallbona de les Monges, Verdú, Vilagrassa

Government
  - Body: Urgell Comarcal Council
  - President: José Luis Marín (ERC)

Area
  - Total: 579.6 km^{2} (223.8 sq mi)

Population (2014)
  - Total: 36,526
  - Density: 63.02/km^{2} (163.2/sq mi)
- Demonym
- Time zone: UTC+1 (CET)
  - Summer (DST): UTC+2 (CEST)
- Largest municipality: Tàrrega
- Website: urgell.cat

Urgell (Catalan pronunciation: [urˈ(d)ʒeʎ]), also known as Baix Urgell (baix meaning "lower", by contrast with Alt Urgell "Upper Urgell"), is a comarca (county) in Ponent, Catalonia (Spain), forming only a borderland portion of the region historically known as Urgell, one of the Catalan counties.

The capital is the city of Tàrrega.

== Municipalities ==
| Municipality | Population (2014) | Area km^{2} |
|---|---|---|
| Agramunt | 5,515 | 79.6 |
| Anglesola | 1,360 | 23.5 |
| Belianes | 555 | 15.7 |
| Bellpuig | 4,956 | 35.0 |
| Castellserà | 1,083 | 15.8 |
| Ciutadilla | 209 | 17.0 |
| La Fuliola | 1,294 | 11.0 |
| Guimerà | 295 | 25.8 |
| Maldà | 227 | 31.4 |
| Nalec | 93 | 9.2 |
| Els Omells de na Gaia | 141 | 13.5 |
| Ossó de Sió | 211 | 26.3 |
| Preixana | 405 | 21.5 |
| Puigverd d'Agramunt | 259 | 17.0 |
| Sant Martí de Riucorb | 685 | 34.9 |
| Tàrrega | 16,587 | 88.4 |
| Tornabous | 911 | 24.2 |
| Vallbona de les Monges | 262 | 34.1 |
| Verdú | 964 | 35.8 |
| Vilagrassa | 514 | 19.9 |
| • Total: 20 | 36,526 | 579.6 |

== See also ==
- Counts of Urgell
- County of Urgell
- La Seu d'Urgell
- Pla d'Urgell
- Roman Catholic Diocese of Urgell
