= Sant Martí de Riucorb =

- Municipality
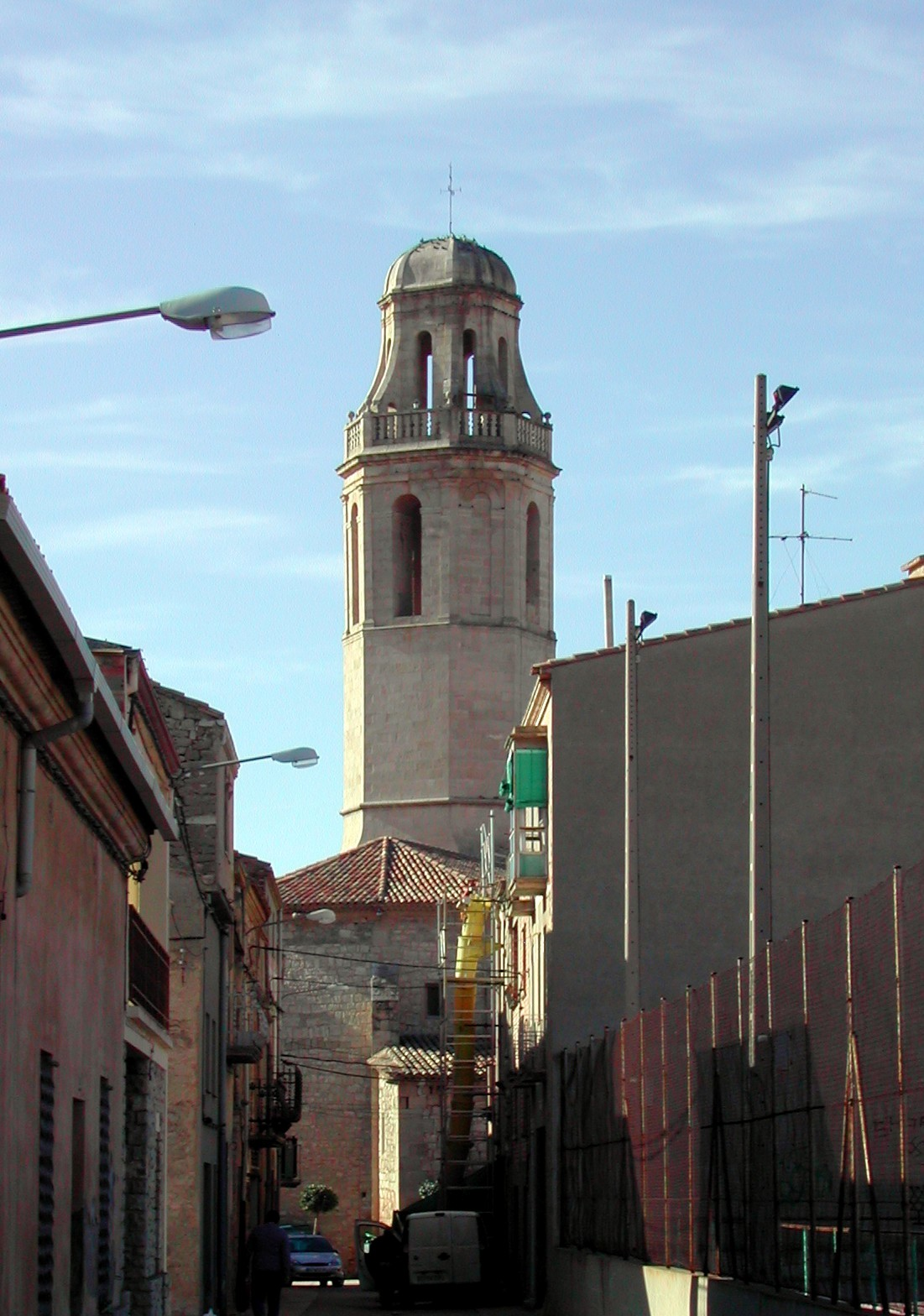
- St. Martin's church tower

- Coat of arms

- Location in Catalonia
- Coordinates: 41.561°N 1.0555°E
- Country: Spain
- Community: Catalonia
- Province: Lleida
- Comarca: Urgell

Government
  - Mayor: Jaume Pallàs Carbonell (2015)

Area
  - Total: 34.9 km^{2} (13.5 sq mi)

Population (2025-01-01)
  - Total: 668
  - Density: 19.1/km^{2} (49.6/sq mi)
- Website: santmartiriucorb.cat

Sant Martí de Riucorb (Catalan pronunciation: [ˈsam maɾˈti ðe riwˈkɔɾp]) is a municipality in the province of Lleida and autonomous community of Catalonia, Spain. It was created in 1972 by the merger of the former municipalities of Sant Martí de Maldà and Rocafort de Vallbona.

It has a population of 668 (register office, 2025).

== Heraldry ==
Sant Martí de Riucorb	Azure, a miter of gold embellished with silver on an abbot's staff perched on a stick of gold.
