= Santa Coloma de Queralt =

- Municipality
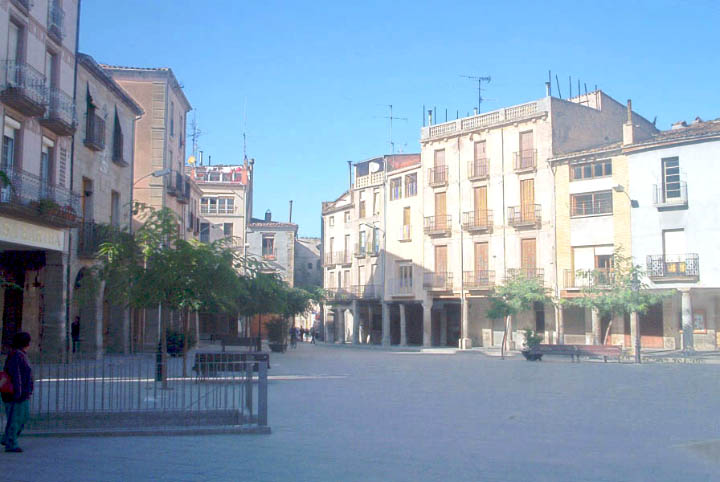

- Location in the Province of Tarragona Location in Catalonia Location in Spain
- Coordinates: 41°32′N 1°23′E
- Country: Spain
- Community: Catalonia
- Province: Tarragona
- Comarca: Conca de Barberà

Government
  - Mayor: Magí Trullols Trull (2015)

Area
  - Total: 33.8 km^{2} (13.1 sq mi)
- Elevation: 674 m (2,211 ft)

Population (2025-01-01)
  - Total: 2,795
  - Density: 82.7/km^{2} (214/sq mi)
- Demonym: Colomís
- Postal code: 43420
- Website: www.stacqueralt.altanet.org

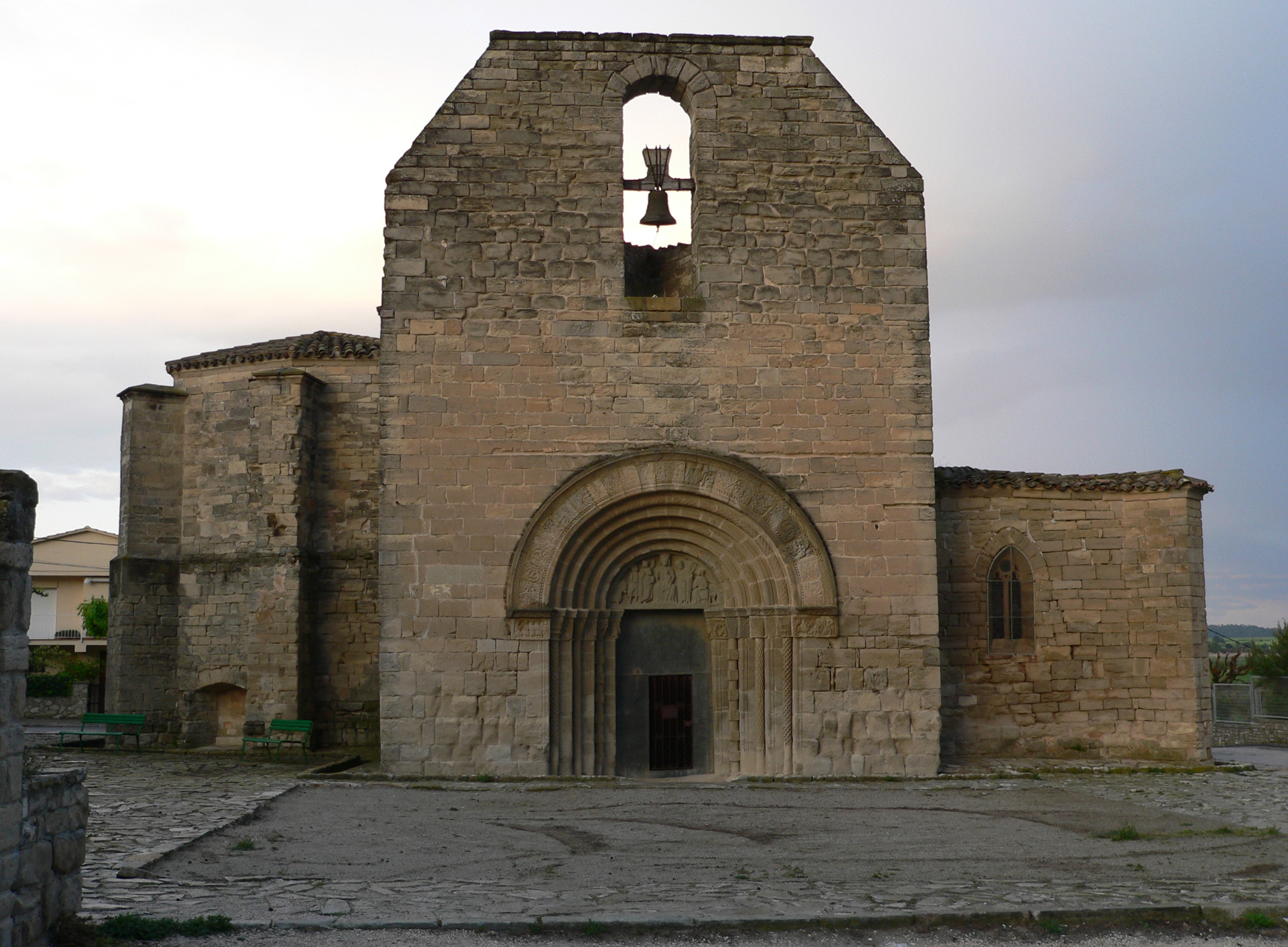
Santa Maria de Bell-lloc.

Santa Coloma de Queralt (Catalan pronunciation: [ˈsantə kuˈlomə ðə kəˈɾal]) is a municipality in the comarca of the Conca de Barberà in Catalonia, Spain. It has a population of 2,795 (register office, 2025).

It is situated in the north-east of the comarca about 60 km (37 mi) from the city of Tarragona. The town is linked to the rest of the comarca and to Igualada by the C-241 road.

== History ==
In 976, Borrell II, Count of Barcelona, sold the castle of Queralt and the surrounding area to Viscount Guitart, and by 1018, castles had been built at Santa Coloma and other strategic locations. The Gurb-Queralt family established a barony and remained in control of the area for the next two centuries. By the end of the thirteenth century, Santa Coloma de Queralt was an important regional centre, serving as a market town that linked the local community and their need for commercial goods brought from other parts of the Mediterranean with the outside world. These commercial activities attracted Jews, so that by the early fourteenth century, of the one hundred and fifty houses in the town, fifty were occupied by Jewish families.

The Catalan Revolt in the mid-seventeenth century came about as a result of the continuing presence in Catalonia of Spanish troops during the Franco-Spanish War between the Kingdom of France and the Monarchy of Spain. Dalmau de Queralt, Count of Santa Coloma, who was the Spanish viceroy of Catalonia at the time, was assassinated by the rebels near the beginning of the revolt. After the war, the town returned to the control of the Queralt family.

== Tourism ==
Santa Coloma de Queralt is a historic town. Some of the main points of interest are:

- The four medieval gateways that formed part of the walls that used to surround the old town.
- The remains of the Castles d'Aguiló and Queralt, and the Palace of the Counts of Queralt is an imposing edifice.
- There are two squares surrounded by porticoed buildings, the Plaça Major and the Plaça de l’Església.
- The Casa de la Villa now houses the town hall
- The Jewish neighbourhood has small twisting streets.
- The Gothic church of Santa Coloma was built in the 14th century.
- The Church of Santa Maria de Bell-lloc dates to the 13th and 14th century. It is built in Gothic style but with a Romanesque portal. It houses the alabaster sepulchre of the Counts of Queralt which dates from 1370.

== Bibliography ==
- Panareda Clopés, Josep Maria; Rios Calvet, Jaume; Rabella Vives, Josep Maria (1989). Guia de Catalunya, Barcelona: Caixa de Catalunya. ISBN 84-87135-01-3 (Spanish). ISBN 84-87135-02-1 (Catalan).
