= Maldà =

- Municipality
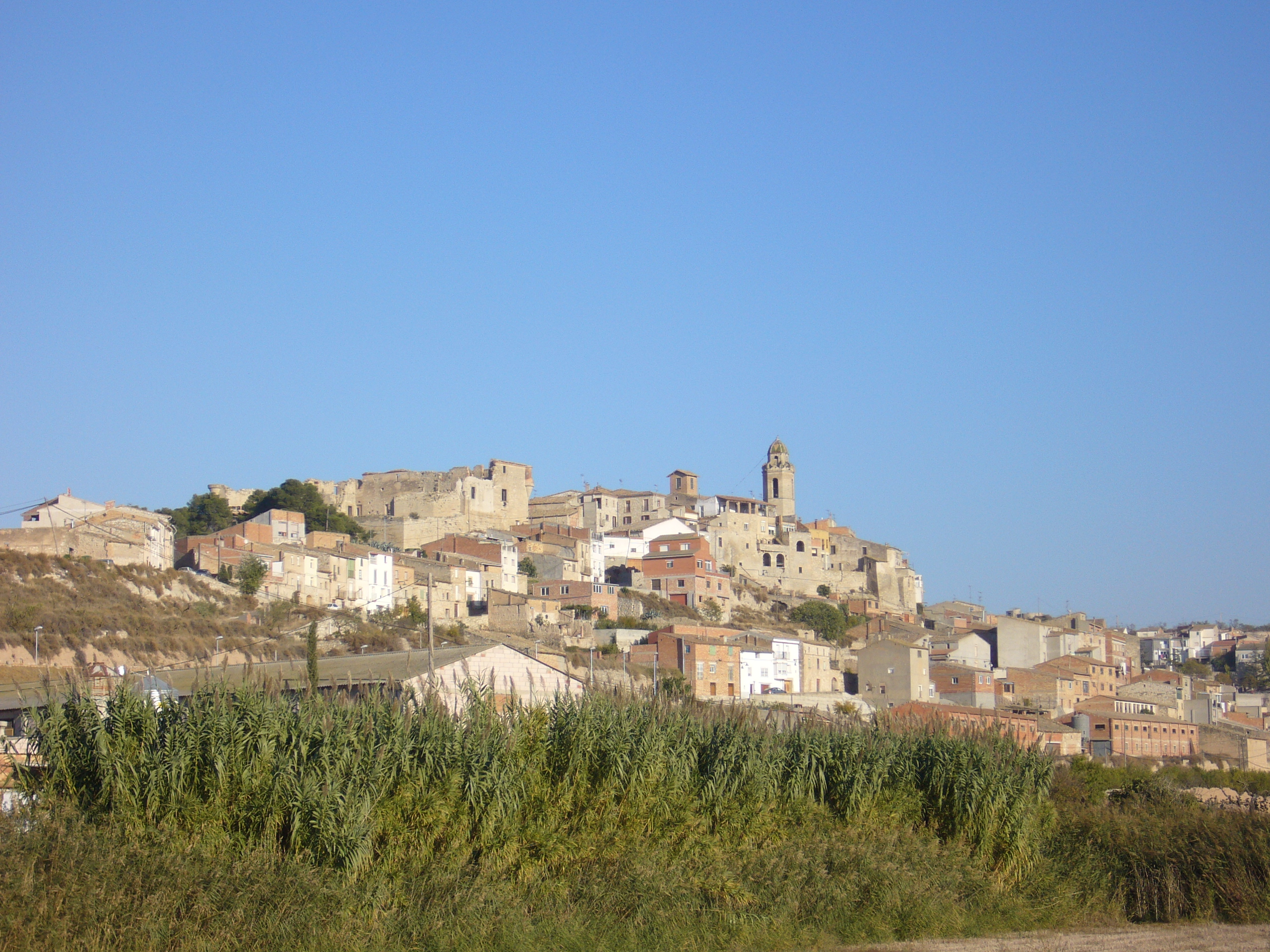

- Coat of arms

- Location of Urgell in the region of Catalonia

- Location of Maldà in the county of Urgell
- Coordinates: 41°33′10″N 1°2′22″E
- Country: Spain
- Region: Catalonia
- Province: Lleida
- County: Urgell

Government
  - Mayor: Josep Maria Batlle Martorell (2019)

Area
  - Total: 31.4 km^{2} (12.1 sq mi)
- Elevation: 428 m (1,404 ft)

Population (2025-01-01)
  - Total: 239
  - Density: 7.61/km^{2} (19.7/sq mi)
- Postal code: 25266
- Website: malda.cat

Maldà (Catalan pronunciation: [malˈda]) is a municipality in the comarca of Urgell, Catalonia, Spain.

It has a population of 239 (register office, 2025).

== Interesting places ==
- Castell de Maldà: Medieval castle built in the 13th and 14th centuries.
- Església de Santa Maria: Baroque St. Mary church built in the 18th century.
- Església de Sant Pere: Romanesque St. Peter church of the 12th century.
- Església de Sant Joan de Maldanell: St. Joan of Maldanell church
- Parc de la Font Vella: Leisure and picnic area.

== Photo gallery ==
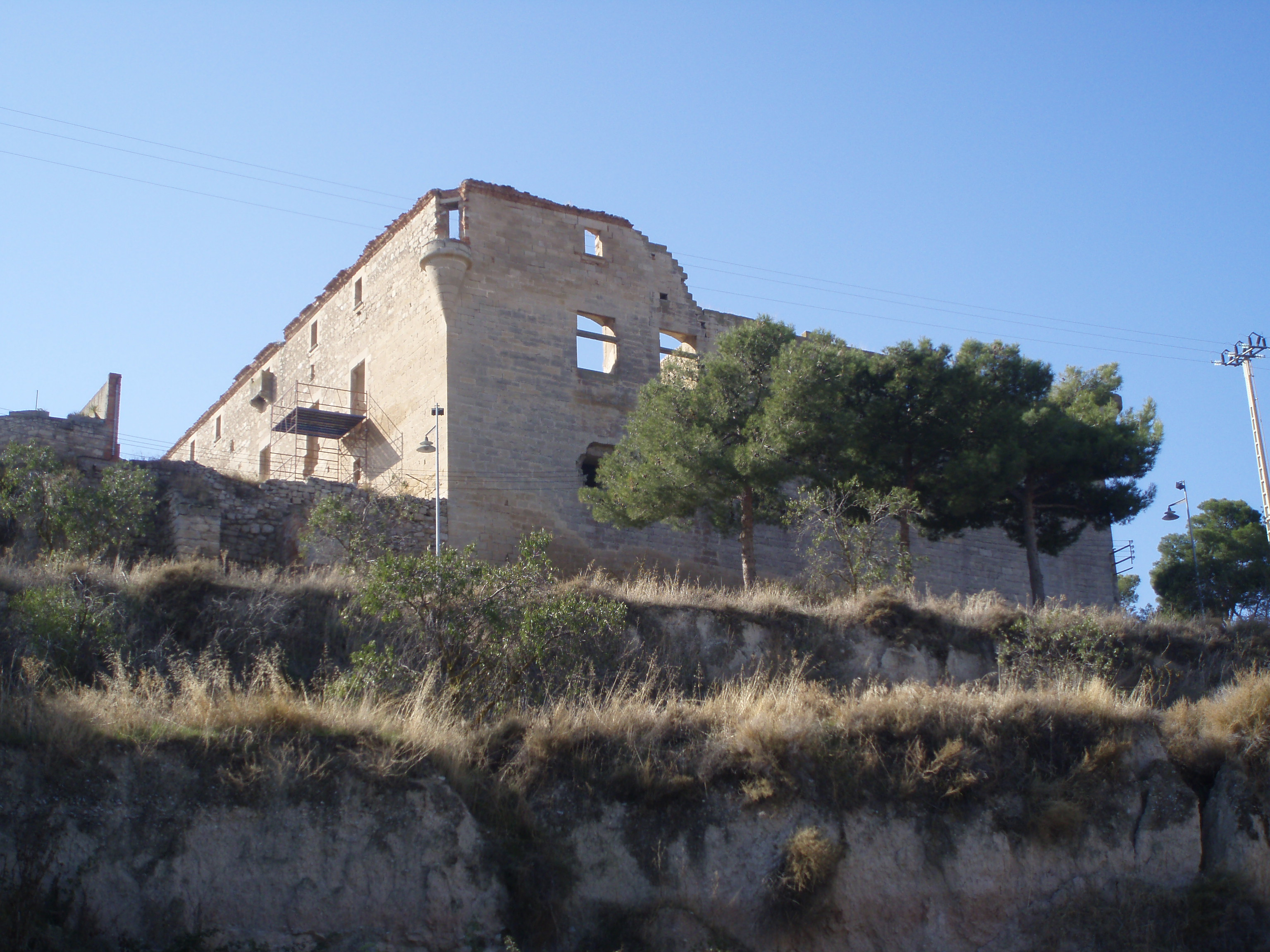
Maldà's Castle

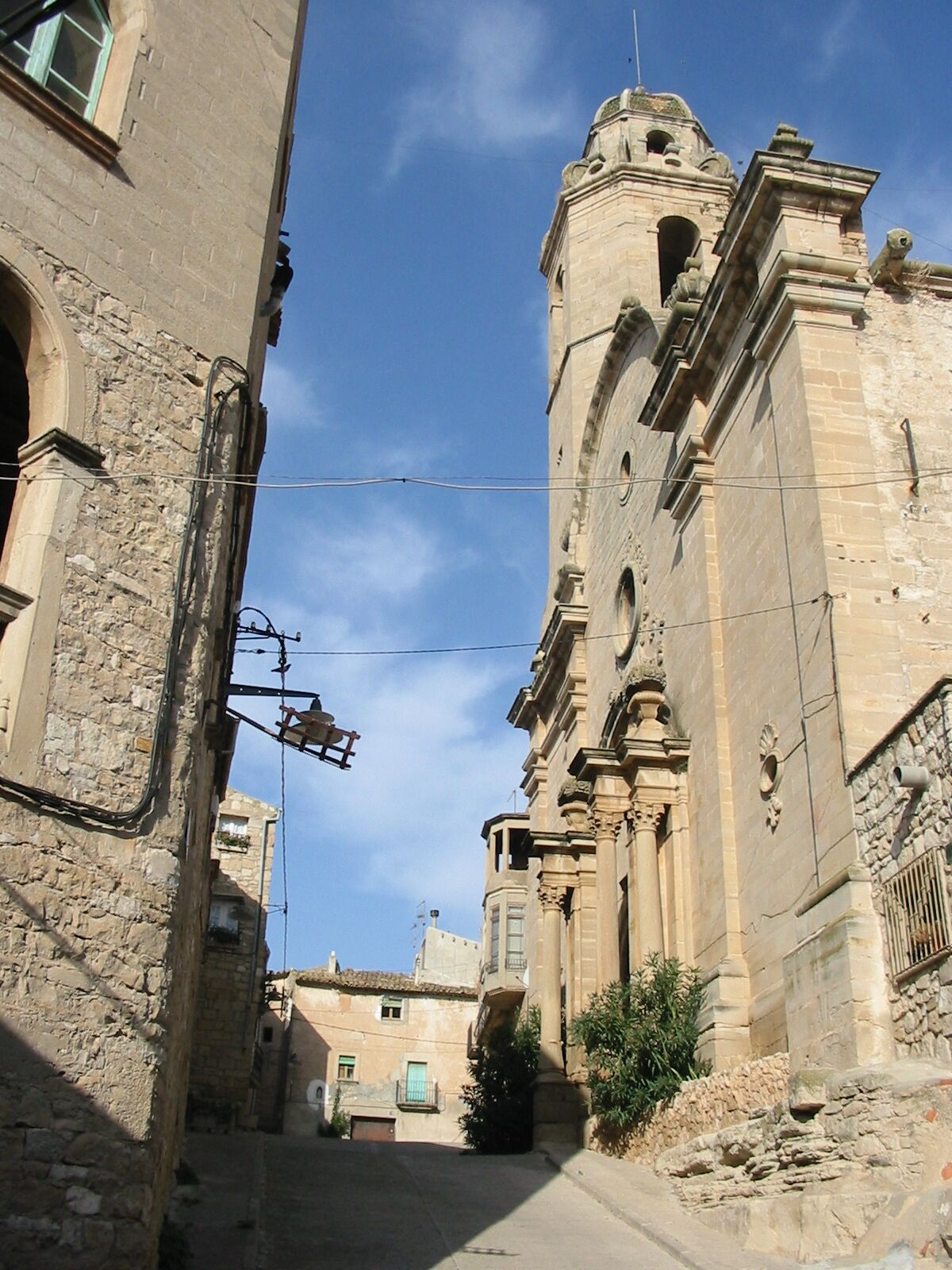
Santa Maria's Church

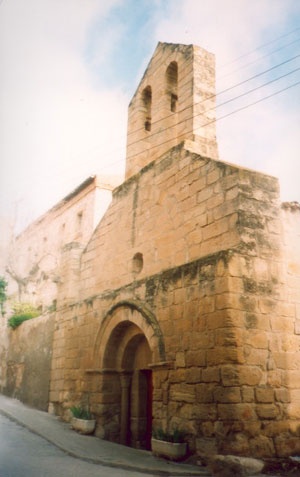
Sant Pere's romanesque Church

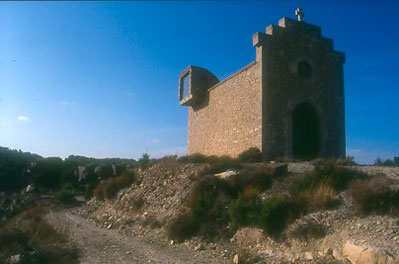
Sant Joan de Maldanell's Church

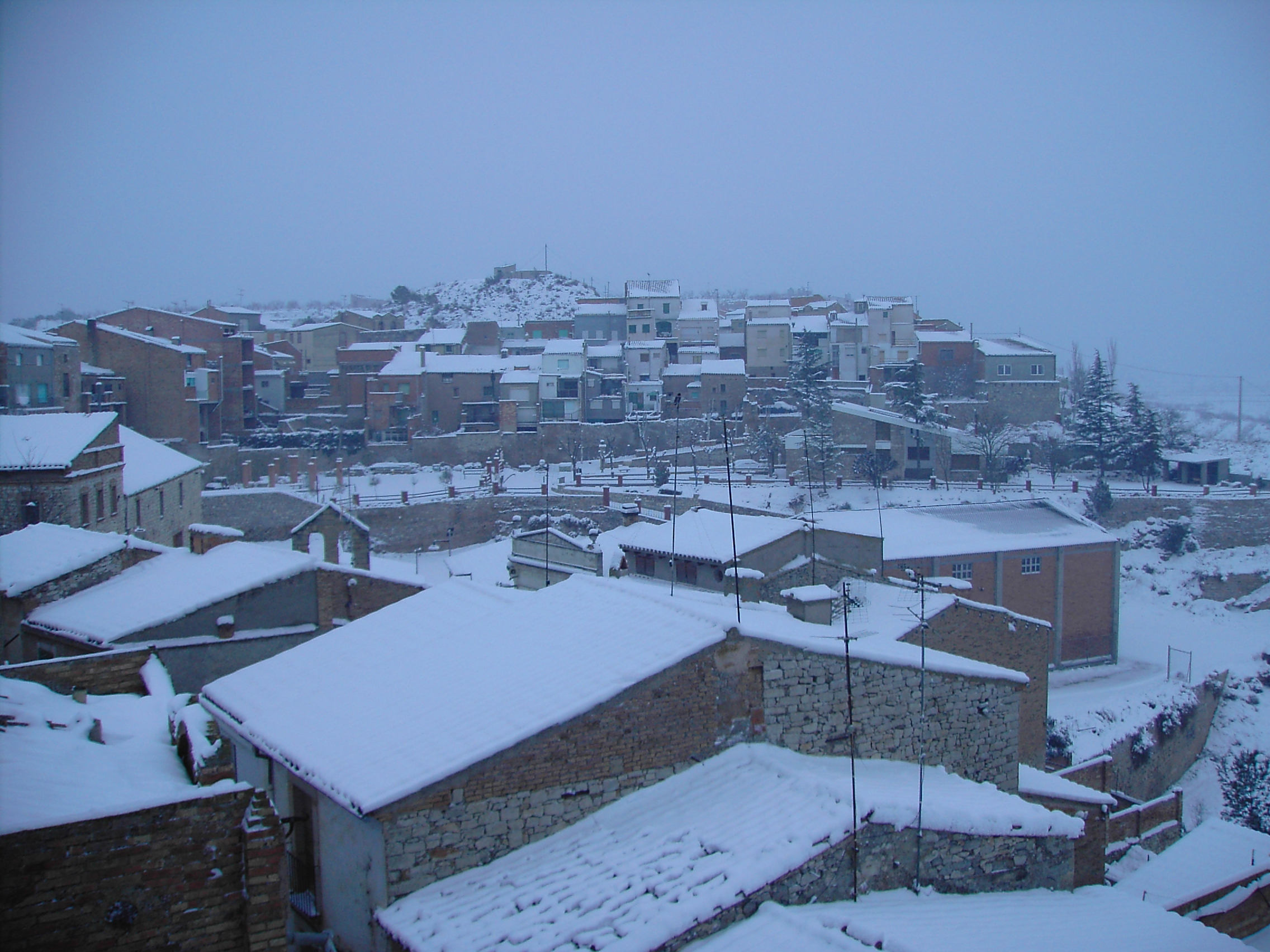
Maldà after snowing

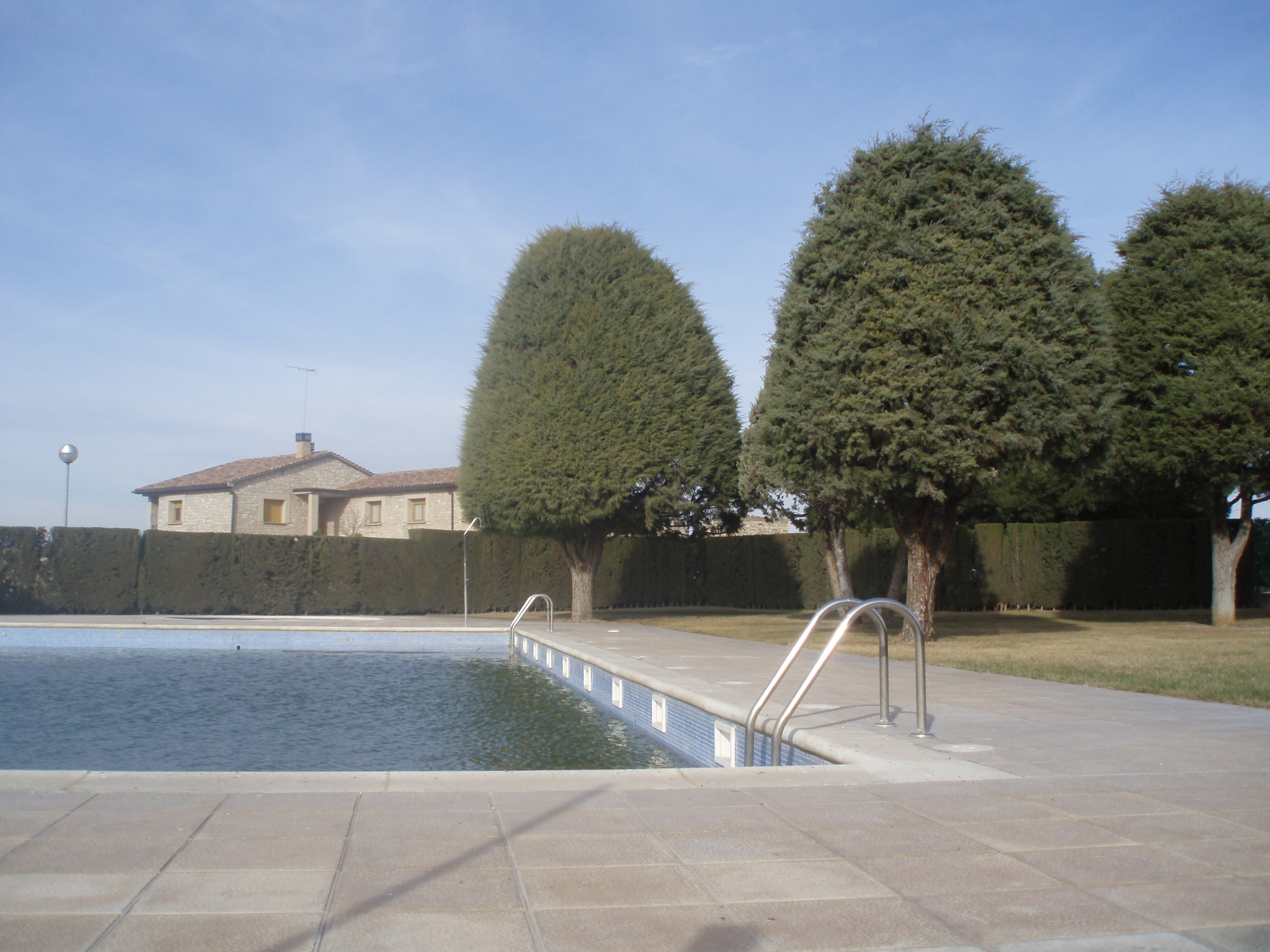
Maldà's pool

== See also ==
- Sender de la Baronia de Maldà
