= List of Rodalies de Catalunya stations =

This is a complete list of the railway stations served by Rodalies de Catalunya services.

== Stations ==
*	Transfer station to other transport systems

Station	Railway line(s)	Served by	Transfers	Location	
Station	Railway line(s)	Served by	Transfers	Province	Municipality
Aguilar de Segarra	Lleida–Manresa–Barcelona	R12	—	Barcelona	Aguilar de Segarra
Airport*	El Prat de Llobregat–Airport	R2 Nord	Barcelona–El Prat Airport; Barcelona Metro line 9 (L9 Sud)	Barcelona	El Prat de Llobregat
Alcover	Tarragona–Lleida	R14	—	Tarragona	Alcover
Altafulla-Tamarit	Valencia–Sant Vicenç de Calders	R14, R15, R16, R17, RT2	—	Tarragona	Altafulla
Anglesola	Lleida–Manresa–Barcelona	R12	—	Lleida	Anglesola
Arenys de Mar	Barcelona–Mataró–Maçanet-Massanes	R1, RG1	—	Barcelona	Arenys de Mar
Ascó	Reus–Caspe–Zaragoza	R15	—	Tarragona	Ascó
Badalona	Barcelona–Mataró–Maçanet-Massanes	R1, RG1	—	Barcelona	Badalona
Balenyà-Els Hostalets	Barcelona–Latour-de-Carol-Enveitg	R3	—	Barcelona	Balenyà
Balenyà-Tona-Seva	Barcelona–Latour-de-Carol-Enveitg	R3	—	Barcelona	Seva
Barberà del Vallès	Lleida–Manresa–Barcelona	R4, R12	—	Barcelona	Barberà del Vallès
Barcelona Arc de Triomf*	Lleida–Manresa–Barcelona; Barcelona–Mataró–Maçanet-Massanes	R1, R3, R4, R12, RG1	Barcelona Metro line 1 National and international coach services at Estació del Nord	Barcelona	Barcelona
Barcelona El Clot*	Barcelona–Cerbère; Barcelona–Mataró–Maçanet-Massanes	R1, R2, R2 Nord, R11, RG1	Barcelona Metro lines 1 and 2	Barcelona	Barcelona
Barcelona Estació de França*	Madrid–Barcelona; Barcelona–Cerbère	R2 Sud, R13, R14, R15, R16	Renfe Operadora-operated long-distance rail services Barcelona Metro line 4 at Barceloneta station	Barcelona	Barcelona
Barcelona Fabra i Puig*	Lleida–Manresa–Barcelona	R3, R4, R7, R12	Barcelona Metro line 1 at Fabra i Puig station National coach services	Barcelona	Barcelona
Barcelona La Sagrera-Meridiana*	Lleida–Manresa–Barcelona	R3, R4, R12	Barcelona Metro lines 1, 5 and 9/10 (L9 Nord/L10)	Barcelona	Barcelona
Barcelona Passeig de Gràcia*	Madrid–Barcelona	R2, R2 Nord, R2 Sud, R11, R13, R14, R15, R16	Barcelona Metro lines 2, 3 and 4	Barcelona	Barcelona
Barcelona Plaça de Catalunya*	Lleida–Manresa–Barcelona	R1, R3, R4, R12, RG1	Barcelona Metro lines 1, 3, 6 and 7 Vallès Metro commuter rail services	Barcelona	Barcelona
Barcelona Sant Andreu*	Barcelona–Cerbère	R2, R2 Nord, R11	Barcelona Metro line 1 at Sant Andreu station	Barcelona	Barcelona
Barcelona Sants*	Lleida–Manresa–Barcelona; Madrid–Barcelona	R1, R2, R2 Nord, R2 Sud, R3, R4, R11, R12, R13, R14, R15, R16, RG1	Renfe Operadora-operated high-speed and long-distance rail services TGV high-speed rail services Barcelona Metro lines 3 and 5 at Sants Estació station National and international coach services	Barcelona	Barcelona
Barcelona Torre del Baró - Vallbona*	Lleida–Manresa–Barcelona	R3, R4, R7, R12	Barcelona Metro line 11 at Torre Baró - Vallbona station	Barcelona	Barcelona
Bell-lloc d'Urgell	Lleida–Manresa–Barcelona	R12	—	Lleida	Bell-lloc d'Urgell
Bellpuig	Lleida–Manresa–Barcelona	R12	—	Lleida	Bellpuig
Bellvitge-Gornal*	Madrid–Barcelona	R2, R2 Nord, R2 Sud, R15	Barcelona Metro line 8, Baix Llobregat Metro and other commuter rail services at Gornal station	Barcelona	L'Hospitalet de Llobregat
Blanes*	Barcelona–Mataró–Maçanet-Massanes	R1, RG1	Shuttle bus to Lloret de Mar and Tossa de Mar	Barcelona	Blanes
Bordils-Juià	Barcelona–Cerbère	R11, RG1	—	Girona	Bordils
Borgonyà	Barcelona–Latour-de-Carol-Enveitg	R3	—	Barcelona	Sant Vicenç de Torelló
Cabrera de Mar-Vilassar de Mar	Barcelona–Mataró–Maçanet-Massanes	R1, RG1	—	Barcelona	Cabrera de Mar
Calaf	Lleida–Manresa–Barcelona	R12	—	Barcelona	Calaf
Calafell	Madrid–Barcelona	R2 Sud, R13, R14, R15	—	Tarragona	Calafell
Caldes d'Estrac	Barcelona–Mataró–Maçanet-Massanes	R1, RG1	—	Barcelona	Caldes d'Estrac
Caldes de Malavella	Barcelona–Cerbère	R11, RG1	—	Girona	Caldes de Malavella
Calella	Barcelona–Mataró–Maçanet-Massanes	R1, RG1	—	Barcelona	Barcelona
Camallera	Barcelona–Cerbère	R11, RG1	—	Girona	Saus, Camallera i Llampaies
Camarles-Deltebre	Valencia–Sant Vicenç de Calders	R16	—	Tarragona	Camarles
Cambrils	Valencia–Sant Vicenç de Calders	R16, RT2	—	Tarragona	Cambrils
Camp-redó	Valencia–Sant Vicenç de Calders	R16	—	Tarragona	Tortosa
Campdevànol	Barcelona–Latour-de-Carol-Enveitg	R3	—	Girona	Campdevànol
Canet de Mar	Barcelona–Mataró–Maçanet-Massanes	R1, RG1	—	Barcelona	Canet de Mar
Capçanes	Reus–Caspe–Zaragoza	R15	—	Tarragona	Capçanes
Cardedeu	Barcelona–Cerbère	R2 Nord	—	Barcelona	Cardedeu
Castellbell i el Vilar-Monistrol de Montserrat	Lleida–Manresa–Barcelona	R4	—	Barcelona	Castellbell i el Vilar
Castellbisbal	Castellbisbal–Mollet-Sant Fost; Sant Vicenç de Calders–Vilafranca del Penedès–Barcelona	R4, R8	—	Barcelona	Castellbisbal
Castelldefels	Madrid–Barcelona	R2, R2 Sud, R13, R14, R15	—	Barcelona	Castelldefels
Castellnou de Seana	Lleida–Manresa–Barcelona	R12	—	Lleida	Castellnou de Seana
Celrà	Barcelona–Cerbère	R11, RG1	—	Girona	Celrà
Centelles	Barcelona–Latour-de-Carol-Enveitg	R3	—	Barcelona	Centelles
Cerbère*	Barcelona–Cerbère	R11	Intercités long-distance rail services TER Languedoc-Roussillon regional rail services	(Station located in Cerbère, Pyrénées-Orientales, France.)	
Cerdanyola del Vallès	Lleida–Manresa–Barcelona	R4, R7, R12	—	Barcelona	Cerdanyola del Vallès
Cerdanyola Universitat	Castellbisbal–Mollet-Sant Fost	R7, R8	—	Barcelona	Cerdanyola del Vallès
Cervera	Lleida–Manresa–Barcelona	R12	—	Lleida	Cervera
Colera	Barcelona–Cerbère	R11, RG1	—	Girona	Colera
Cornellà*	Sant Vicenç de Calders–Vilafranca del Penedès–Barcelona	R1, R4	Barcelona Metro line 5 Trambaix light rail services	Barcelona	Cornellà de Llobregat
Cubelles	Madrid–Barcelona	R2 Sud, R13, R14, R15	—	Barcelona	Cubelles
Cunit	Madrid–Barcelona	R2 Sud, R13, R14, R15	—	Tarragona	Cunit
Duesaigües-L'Argentera	Reus–Caspe–Zaragoza	R15	—	Tarragona	L'Argentera
El Masnou	Barcelona–Mataró–Maçanet-Massanes	R1, RG1	—	Barcelona	El Masnou
El Papiol	Sant Vicenç de Calders–Vilafranca del Penedès–Barcelona	R4	—	Barcelona	El Papiol
El Prat de Llobregat*	Madrid–Barcelona	R2, R2 Nord, R2 Sud, R15	Barcelona Metro line 9 (L9 Sud)	Barcelona	El Prat de Llobregat
El Vendrell	Sant Vicenç de Calders–Vilafranca del Penedès–Barcelona	R4, RT2	—	Tarragona	El Vendrell
Els Guiamets	Reus–Caspe–Zaragoza	R15	—	Tarragona	Els Guiamets
Els Monjos	Sant Vicenç de Calders–Vilafranca del Penedès–Barcelona	R4	—	Barcelona	Santa Margarida i els Monjos
Figaró	Barcelona–Latour-de-Carol-Enveitg	R3	—	Barcelona	Figaró-Montmany
Figueres	Barcelona–Cerbère	R11, RG1	—	Girona	Figueres
Flaçà	Barcelona–Cerbère	R11, RG1	—	Girona	Flaçà
Flix	Reus–Caspe–Zaragoza	R15	—	Tarragona	Flix
Fornells de la Selva	Barcelona–Cerbère	R11, RG1	—	Girona	Fornells de la Selva
Garraf	Madrid–Barcelona	R2 Sud	—	Barcelona	Sitges
Gavà	Madrid–Barcelona	R2 Sud, R13, R14, R15	—	Barcelona	Gavà
Gelida*	Sant Vicenç de Calders–Vilafranca del Penedès–Barcelona	R4	Gelida Funicular	Barcelona	Gelida
Girona*	Barcelona–Cerbère	R11, RG1	Renfe Operadora-operated high-speed rail services TGV high-speed rail services National and international coach services	Girona	Girona
Golmés	Lleida–Manresa–Barcelona	R12	—	Lleida	Golmés
Granollers Centre	Barcelona–Cerbère	R2, R2 Nord, R8, R11	—	Barcelona	Granollers
Granollers-Canovelles	Barcelona–Latour-de-Carol-Enveitg	R3	—	Barcelona	Granollers
Gualba	Barcelona–Cerbère	R2 Nord, R11	—	Barcelona	Gualba
Hostalric	Barcelona–Cerbère	R2 Nord, R11	—	Girona	Hostalric
Juneda	Madrid–Barcelona	R13, R14	—	Lleida	Juneda
L'Aldea-Amposta*	Valencia–Sant Vicenç de Calders	R16	Renfe Operadora-operated long-distance and regional rail services	Tarragona	L'Aldea
L'Ametlla de Mar	Valencia–Sant Vicenç de Calders	R16	—	Tarragona	L'Ametlla de Mar
L'Ampolla-Perelló-Deltebre	Valencia–Sant Vicenç de Calders	R16	—	Tarragona	L'Ampolla
L'Arboç	Sant Vicenç de Calders–Vilafranca del Penedès–Barcelona	R4, RT2	—	Tarragona	L'Arboç
L'Espluga de Francolí	Tarragona–Lleida	R13, R14	—	Tarragona	L'Espluga de Francolí
L'Hospitalet de Llobregat*	Lleida–Manresa–Barcelona; Sant Vicenç de Calders–Vilafranca del Penedès–Barcelona	R1, R3, R4, R12, RG1	Barcelona Metro line 1 at Rambla Just Oliveras station	Barcelona	L'Hospitalet de Llobregat
L'Hospitalet de l'Infant	Valencia–Sant Vicenç de Calders	R16, RT2	—	Tarragona	L'Hospitalet de l'Infant
La Farga de Bebié	Barcelona–Latour-de-Carol-Enveitg	R3	—	Barcelona	Montesquiu
La Floresta	Tarragona–Lleida	R13, R14	—	Lleida	La Floresta
La Garriga	Barcelona–Latour-de-Carol-Enveitg	R3	—	Barcelona	La Garriga
La Granada	Sant Vicenç de Calders–Vilafranca del Penedès–Barcelona	R4	—	Barcelona	La Granada
La Llagosta	Barcelona–Cerbère	R2, R2 Nord	—	Barcelona	La Llagosta
La Molina	Barcelona–Latour-de-Carol-Enveitg	R3	—	Girona	Alp
La Plana-Picamoixons	Tarragona–Lleida; La Plana-Picamoixons–Sant Vicenç de Calders	R13, R14	—	Tarragona	Valls
La Riba	Tarragona–Lleida	R13, R14	—	Tarragona	La Riba
La Selva del Camp	Tarragona–Lleida	R14	—	Tarragona	La Selva del Camp
Latour-de-Carol-Enveitg*	Barcelona–Latour-de-Carol-Enveitg	R3	Intercités long-distance rail services TER Languedoc-Roussillon and TER Midi-Pyrénées regional rail services	(Station located in Latour-de-Carol, Pyrénées-Orientales, France.)	
Lavern-Subirats	Sant Vicenç de Calders–Vilafranca del Penedès–Barcelona	R4	—	Barcelona	Subirats
Les Borges Blanques	Tarragona–Lleida	R13, R14	—	Lleida	Les Borges Blanques
Les Borges del Camp	Reus–Caspe–Zaragoza	R15	—	Tarragona	Les Borges del Camp
Les Franqueses del Vallès	Barcelona–Latour-de-Carol-Enveitg	R3	—	Barcelona	Les Franqueses del Vallès
Les Franqueses-Granollers Nord	Barcelona–Cerbère	R2 Nord	—	Barcelona	Les Franqueses del Vallès
Llançà	Barcelona–Cerbère	R11, RG1	—	Girona	Llançà
Lleida Pirineus*	Lleida–Manresa–Barcelona; Madrid–Barcelona	R12, R13, R14	Renfe Operadora-operated high-speed and regional rail services Lleida–La Pobla Line	Lleida	Lleida
Llinars del Vallès	Barcelona–Cerbère	R2 Nord	—	Barcelona	Llinars del Vallès
Malgrat de Mar	Barcelona–Mataró–Maçanet-Massanes	R1, RG1	—	Barcelona	Malgrat de Mar
Manlleu	Barcelona–Latour-de-Carol-Enveitg	R3	—	Barcelona	Manlleu
Manresa	Lleida–Manresa–Barcelona	R4, R12	—	Barcelona	Manresa
Martorell Central*	Sant Vicenç de Calders–Vilafranca del Penedès–Barcelona	R4, R8	Baix Llobregat Metro and other commuter rail services	Barcelona	Martorell
Marçà-Falset	Reus–Caspe–Zaragoza	R15	—	Tarragona	Marçà
Mataró	Barcelona–Mataró–Maçanet-Massanes	R1, RG1	—	Barcelona	Mataró
Maçanet-Massanes	Barcelona–Cerbère; Barcelona–Mataró–Maçanet-Massanes	R1, R2 Nord, R11, RG1	—	Girona	Maçanet de la Selva
Molins de Rei	Sant Vicenç de Calders–Vilafranca del Penedès–Barcelona	R1, R4	—	Barcelona	Molins de Rei
Mollerussa	Lleida–Manresa–Barcelona	R12	—	Lleida	Mollerussa
Mollet-Sant Fost	Barcelona–Cerbère; Castellbisbal–Mollet-Sant Fost	R2, R2 Nord, R8	—	Barcelona	Mollet del Vallès
Mollet-Santa Rosa	Barcelona–Latour-de-Carol-Enveitg	R3	—	Barcelona	Mollet del Vallès
Montblanc	Tarragona–Lleida	R13, R14	—	Tarragona	Montblanc
Montcada Bifurcació	Barcelona–Latour-de-Carol-Enveitg; Lleida–Manresa–Barcelona	R3, R4, R7, R12	—	Barcelona	Montcada i Reixac
Montcada Ripollet	Barcelona–Latour-de-Carol-Enveitg	R3	—	Barcelona	Montcada i Reixac
Montcada i Reixac	Barcelona–Cerbère	R2, R2 Nord	—	Barcelona	Montcada i Reixac
Montcada i Reixac-Manresa	Lleida–Manresa–Barcelona	R4, R7, R12	—	Barcelona	Montcada i Reixac
Montcada i Reixac-Santa Maria	Lleida–Manresa–Barcelona	R4, R7, R12	—	Barcelona	Montcada i Reixac
Montgat	Barcelona–Mataró–Maçanet-Massanes	R1, RG1	—	Barcelona	Montgat
Montgat Nord	Barcelona–Mataró–Maçanet-Massanes	R1, RG1	—	Barcelona	Montgat
Montmeló	Barcelona–Cerbère	R2, R2 Nord, R8	—	Barcelona	Montmeló
Móra la Nova	Zaragoza–Caspe–Reus	R15	—	Tarragona	Móra la Nova
Nulles-Bràfim	La Plana-Picamoixons–Sant Vicenç de Calders	R13	—	Tarragona	Nulles
Ocata	Barcelona–Mataró–Maçanet-Massanes	R1, RG1	—	Barcelona	El Masnou
Palautordera	Barcelona–Cerbère	R2 Nord	—	Barcelona	Santa Maria de Palautordera
Parets del Vallès	Barcelona–Latour-de-Carol-Enveitg	R3	—	Barcelona	Parets del Vallès
Pineda de Mar	Barcelona–Mataró–Maçanet-Massanes	R1, RG1	—	Barcelona	Pineda de Mar
Planoles	Barcelona–Latour-de-Carol-Enveitg	R3	—	Girona	Planoles
Platja de Castelldefels	Madrid–Barcelona	R2 Sud	—	Barcelona	Castelldefels
Port Aventura	Valencia–Sant Vicenç de Calders	R16, RT2	—	Tarragona	Salou
Portbou*	Barcelona–Cerbère	R11, RG1	Intercités long-distance rail services TER Languedoc-Roussillon regional rail services	Girona	Portbou
Pradell	Reus–Caspe–Zaragoza	R15	—	Tarragona	Pradell de la Teixeta
Premià de Mar	Barcelona–Mataró–Maçanet-Massanes	R1, RG1	—	Barcelona	Premià de Mar
Puigcerdà	Barcelona–Latour-de-Carol-Enveitg	R3	—	Girona	Puigcerdà
Puigverd de Lleida-Artesa de Lleida	Tarragona–Lleida	R13, R14	—	Lleida	Puigverd de Lleida
Rajadell	Lleida–Manresa–Barcelona	R12	—	Barcelona	Rajadell
Reus	Tarragona–Lleida; Reus–Caspe–Zaragoza	R14, R15, RT1	—	Tarragona	Reus
Riba-roja d'Ebre	Reus–Caspe–Zaragoza	R15	—	Tarragona	Riba-roja d'Ebre
Ribes de Freser*	Barcelona–Latour-de-Carol-Enveitg	R3	Vall de Núria Rack Railway	Girona	Ribes de Freser
Riells i Viabrea-Breda	Barcelona–Cerbère	R2 Nord, R11	—	Girona	Riells i Viabrea
Ripoll	Barcelona–Latour-de-Carol-Enveitg	R3	—	Girona	Ripoll
Riudecanyes-Botarell	Reus–Caspe–Zaragoza	R15	—	Tarragona	Riudecanyes
Riudellots	Barcelona–Cerbère	R11, RG1	—	Girona	Riudellots de la Selva
Roda de Barà	La Plana-Picamoixons–Sant Vicenç de Calders	R13	—	Tarragona	Roda de Barà
Roda de Mar	La Plana-Picamoixons–Sant Vicenç de Calders	R13	—	Tarragona	Roda de Barà
Rubí Can Vallhonrat	Castellbisbal–Mollet-Sant Fost	R8	—	Barcelona	Rubí
Sabadell Centre	Lleida–Manresa–Barcelona	R4, R12	—	Barcelona	Sabadell
Sabadell Nord	Lleida–Manresa–Barcelona	R4, R12	—	Barcelona	Sabadell
Sabadell Sud	Lleida–Manresa–Barcelona	R4, R12	—	Barcelona	Sabadell
Salomó	La Plana-Picamoixons–Sant Vicenç de Calders	R13	—	Tarragona	Salomó
Sant Adrià de Besòs*	Barcelona–Mataró–Maçanet-Massanes	R1, RG1	Trambesòs light rail services	Barcelona	Sant Adrià de Besòs
Sant Andreu de Llavaneres	Barcelona–Mataró–Maçanet-Massanes	R1, RG1	—	Barcelona	Sant Andreu de Llavaneres
Sant Celoni	Barcelona–Cerbère	R2 Nord, R11	—	Barcelona	Sant Celoni
Sant Cugat Coll Favà*	Castellbisbal–Mollet-Sant Fost	R8	Vallès Metro commuter rail services at Volpelleres station	Barcelona	Sant Cugat del Vallès
Sant Feliu de Llobregat	Sant Vicenç de Calders–Vilafranca del Penedès–Barcelona	R1, R4	—	Barcelona	Sant Feliu de Llobregat
Sant Guim de Freixenet	Sant Vicenç de Calders–Vilafranca del Penedès–Barcelona	R4	—	Barcelona	Sant Guim de Freixenet
Sant Joan Despí	Sant Vicenç de Calders–Vilafranca del Penedès–Barcelona	R1, R4	—	Barcelona	Sant Joan Despí
Sant Jordi Desvalls	Barcelona–Cerbère	R11, RG1	—	Girona	Sant Jordi Desvalls
Sant Martí Sesgueioles	Lleida–Manresa–Barcelona	R12	—	Barcelona	Sant Martí Sesgueioles
Sant Martí de Centelles	Barcelona–Latour-de-Carol-Enveitg	R3	—	Barcelona	Sant Martí de Centelles
Sant Miquel de Fluvià	Barcelona–Cerbère	R11, RG1	—	Girona	Sant Miquel de Fluvià
Sant Miquel de Gonteres-Viladecavalls	Lleida–Manresa–Barcelona	R4	—	Barcelona	Viladecavalls
Sant Pol de Mar	Barcelona–Mataró–Maçanet-Massanes	R1, RG1	—	Barcelona	Sant Pol de Mar
Sant Quirze de Besora	Barcelona–Latour-de-Carol-Enveitg	R3	—	Barcelona	Sant Quirze de Besora
Sant Sadurní d'Anoia	Sant Vicenç de Calders–Vilafranca del Penedès–Barcelona	R4	—	Barcelona	Sant Sadurní d'Anoia
Sant Vicenç de Calders	Madrid–Barcelona; Sant Vicenç de Calders–Vilafranca del Penedès–Barcelona; Valencia–Sant Vicenç de Calders	R2 Sud, R4, R13, R14, R15, R16, R17, RT2	—	Tarragona	El Vendrell
Sant Vicenç de Castellet	Lleida–Manresa–Barcelona	R4, R12	—	Barcelona	Sant Vicenç de Castellet
Santa Perpètua de Mogoda La Florida	Barcelona–Latour-de-Carol-Enveitg	R3	—	Barcelona	Santa Perpètua de Mogoda
Santa Perpètua de Mogoda Riera de Caldes	Castellbisbal–Mollet-Sant Fost	R8	-	Barcelona	Santa Perpètua de Mogoda
Santa Susanna	Barcelona–Mataró–Maçanet-Massanes	R1, RG1	—	Barcelona	Santa Susanna
Seguers-Sant Pere Sallavinera	Lleida–Manresa–Barcelona	R12	—	Barcelona	Sant Pere Sallavinera
Segur de Calafell	Madrid–Barcelona	R2 Sud, R13, R14	—	Tarragona	Calafell
Sils	Barcelona–Cerbère	R11, RG1	—	Girona	Sils
Sitges	Madrid–Barcelona	R2 Sud, R13, R14, R15	—	Barcelona	Sitges
Tarragona*	Valencia–Sant Vicenç de Calders; Tarragona–Lleida	R14, R15, R16, R17, RT1, RT2	Renfe Operadora-operated long-distance rail services	Tarragona	Tarragona
Terrassa Estació del Nord*	Lleida–Manresa–Barcelona	R4, R12	Vallès Metro commuter rail services	Barcelona	Terrassa
Terrassa Est	Lleida–Manresa–Barcelona	R4, R12	—	Barcelona	Terrassa
Tordera	Barcelona–Mataró–Maçanet-Massanes	R1, RG1	—	Barcelona	Tordera
Torelló	Barcelona–Latour-de-Carol-Enveitg	R3	—	Barcelona	Torelló
Torredembarra	Valencia–Sant Vicenç de Calders	R14, R15, R16, R17, RT2	—	Tarragona	Torredembarra
Tortosa	Valencia–Sant Vicenç de Calders	R16	—	Tarragona	Tortosa
Toses	Barcelona–Latour-de-Carol-Enveitg	R3	—	Girona	Toses
Tàrrega	Lleida–Manresa–Barcelona	R12	—	Lleida	Tàrrega
Ulldecona-Alcanar-La Sénia	Valencia–Sant Vicenç de Calders	R16	—	Tarragona	Ulldecona
Urtx-Alp	Barcelona–Latour-de-Carol-Enveitg	R3	—	Girona	Alp
Vacarisses	Lleida–Manresa–Barcelona	R4	—	Barcelona	Vacarisses
Vacarisses-Torreblanca	Lleida–Manresa–Barcelona	R4	—	Barcelona	Vacarisses
Valls	La Plana-Picamoixons–Sant Vicenç de Calders	R13	—	Tarragona	Valls
Vic	Barcelona–Latour-de-Carol-Enveitg	R3	—	Barcelona	Vic
Vila-seca	Tarragona–Lleida	R14, R15, R16, RT1	—	Tarragona	Vila-seca
Vilabella	La Plana-Picamoixons–Sant Vicenç de Calders	R13	—	Tarragona	Vilabella
Viladecans	Madrid–Barcelona	R2, R2 Sud, R15	—	Barcelona	Viladecans
Viladecavalls	Lleida–Manresa–Barcelona	R4	—	Barcelona	Viladecavalls
Vilafranca del Penedès	Sant Vicenç de Calders–Vilafranca del Penedès–Barcelona	R4	—	Barcelona	Vilafranca del Penedès
Vilajuïga	Barcelona–Cerbère	R11, RG1	—	Girona	Vilajuïga
Vilamalla	Barcelona–Cerbère	R11, RG1	—	Girona	Vilamalla
Vilanova i la Geltrú	Madrid–Barcelona	R2 Sud, R13, R14, R15, R16, R17	—	Barcelona	Vilanova i la Geltrú
Vilassar de Mar	Barcelona–Mataró–Maçanet-Massanes	R1, RG1	—	Barcelona	Vilassar de Mar
Vilaverd	Tarragona–Lleida	R13, R14	—	Tarragona	Vilaverd
Vimbodí	Tarragona–Lleida	R13, R14	—	Tarragona	Vimbodí i Poblet
Vinaixa	Tarragona–Lleida	R13, R14	—	Lleida	Vinaixa
