= Salomó railway station =

Railway station in Catalonia, Spain

Salomó
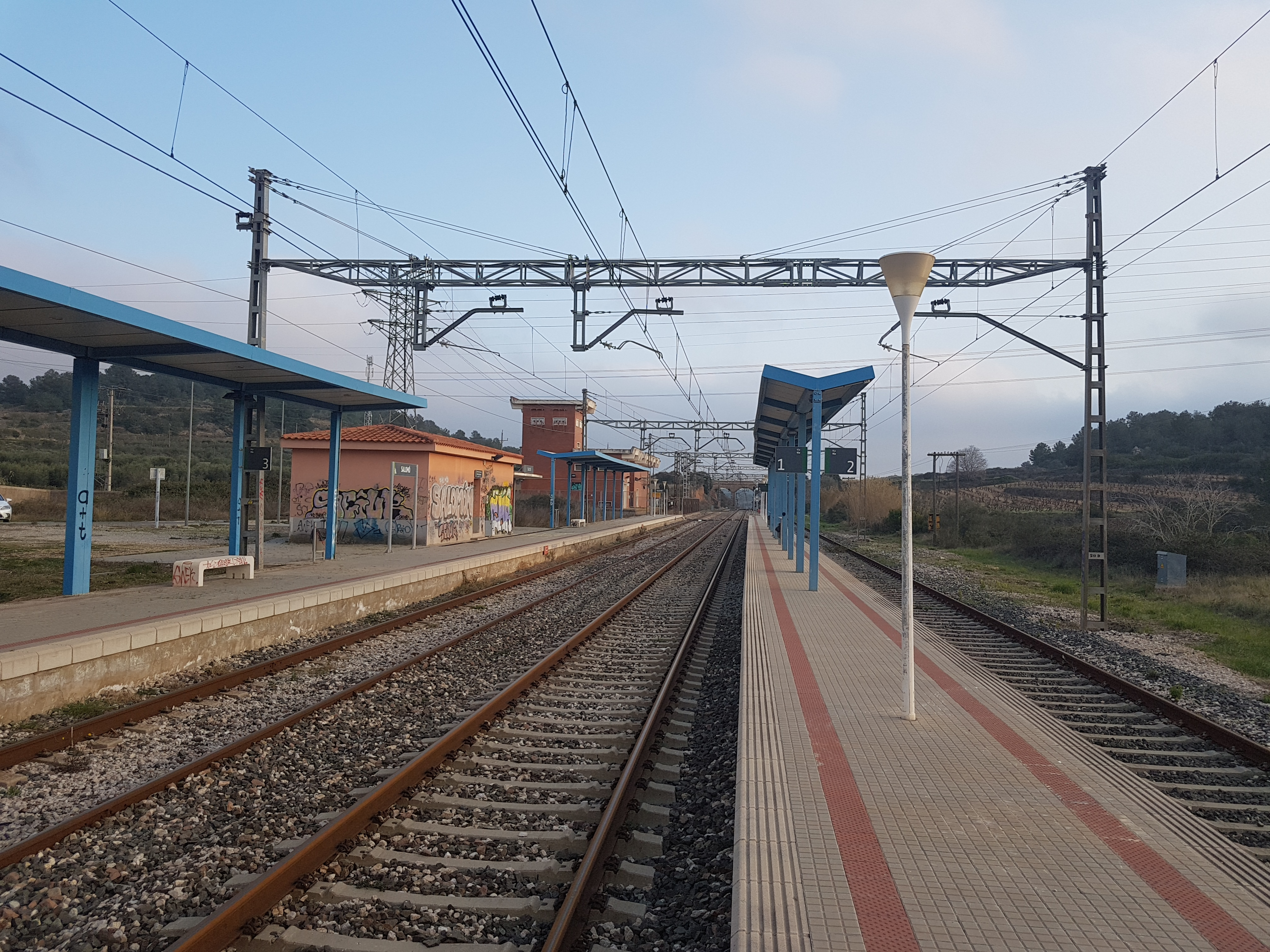
- Salomó Railway Station.

General information
- Location: Passeig de l'Estació, Salomó; Catalonia; Spain
- Coordinates: 41.2234°N 1.3763°E
- System: Rodalies de Catalunya commuter and regional rail station
- Owner: Adif
- Operator: Renfe Operadora

History
- Opened: 1883
Location

Salomó is a railway station owned by ADIF located in the town of Salomó, in the Tarragonès region. The station is on the Barcelona-Vilanova-Valls railway line and is served by trains on the R13 line of Rodalies de Catalunya, operated by Renfe Operadora.

This station entered service in 1883 when the section constructed by the Companyia dels Ferrocarrils de Valls a Vilanova i Barcelona (VVB) between Calafell and Valls was opened, one year after the opening of the line between Vilanova i la Geltrú and Calafell.

In 2016 it recorded an entry of 2,000 passengers.

== Railway services ==
Origin/Destination	Preceding station	Rodalies de Catalunya	Following station	Origin/Destination
La Plana – Picamoixons; Lleida Pirineus	Vilabella; Valls¹		Roda de Barà; Roda de Mar²	Sant Vicenç de Calders; Barcelona-Estació de França; Barcelona-Sant Andreu Comtal

1. Some regional trains do not stop at Vilabella or Nulles-Bràfim, with the next or previous stop being Valls.
2. Some regional trains do not stop at Roda de Barà, with the next or previous stop being Roda de Mar.
