= Nulles-Bràfim railway station =

Railway station in Nulles, Spain

Nulles-Bràfim
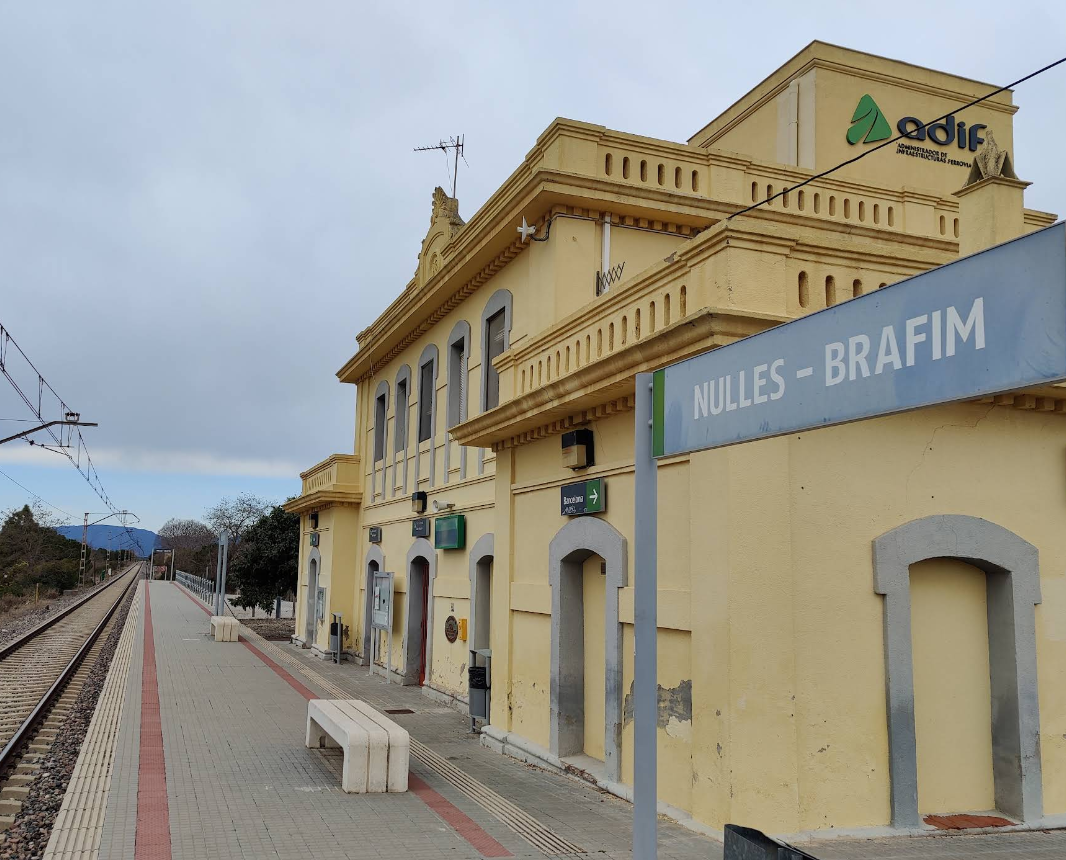
- Nulles-Bràfim Railway Station.

General information
- Location: Carrer de l'Estació s/n, Nulles, Alt Camp; Catalonia; Spain
- Coordinates: 41.25026°N 1.29734°E
- System: Rodalies de Catalunya commuter and regional rail station
- Owner: Adif
- Operator: Renfe Operadora

History
- Opened: 1883
Location

Nulles-Bràfim Station is a railway station located in the municipality of Nulles, in the Alt Camp region of Catalonia, Spain. The station is situated on the Barcelona–Vilanova–Valls railway line and is served by line R13 of the Rodalies de Catalunya regional rail system, operated by Renfe Operadora.

The station was inaugurated in 1883 as part of the section between Calafell and Valls, built by the former Companyia dels Ferrocarrils de Valls a Vilanova i Barcelona (VVB). This section opened one year after the line between Vilanova i la Geltrú and Calafell.

In 2016, the station registered an annual ridership of approximately 1,000 passengers.

== Services ==
Regional rail (R13)
La Plana - Picamoixons; Lleida Pirineus	Valls	Nulles-Bràfim	Vilabella	Sant Vicenç de Calders; Barcelona Estació de França

== See also ==
- Rail transport in Catalonia
- Renfe Operadora
