= 2017 Barcelona train crash =

Passenger train crash in Barcelona on 28 July 2017

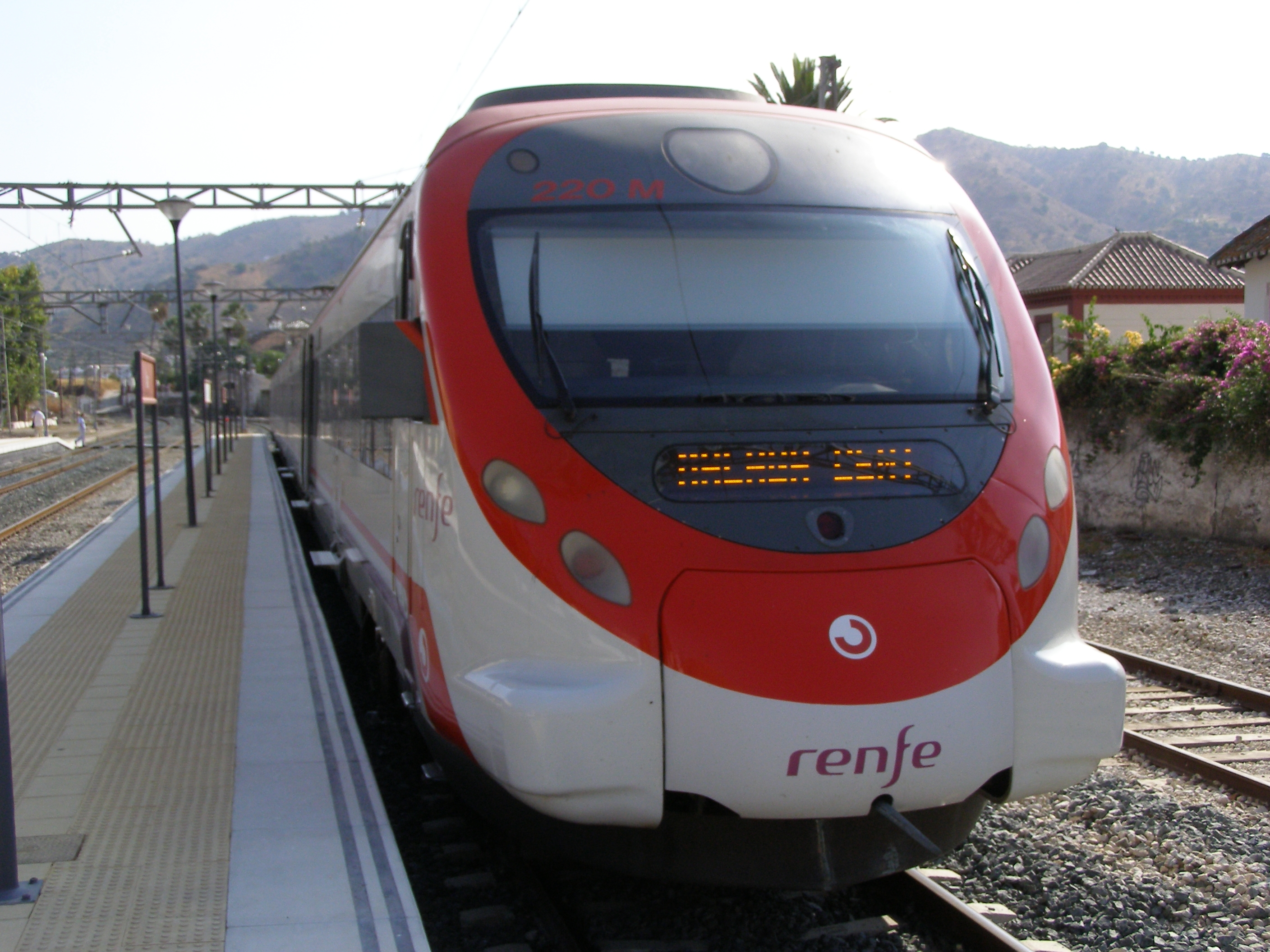
- The train involved was a RENFE Class 465, similar to this one.

Details
- Date: 28 July 2017; ~07:15 CEST (~05:15 UTC)
- Location: Barcelona França railway station, Barcelona
- Country: Spain
- Line: R2 line
- Operator: Renfe Operadora
- Incident type: Collision with buffers and derailment
- Cause: Under investigation

Statistics
- Trains: 1
- Injured: 60

On 28 July 2017, a passenger train crashed into a buffer stop and derailed at Barcelona França station in Barcelona, Spain. Sixty people were injured, eleven of them seriously, including the driver.

== Accident ==
The accident happened at about 07:15 CEST (05:15 UTC). A commuter train collided with the buffers at Barcelona França station and derailed. The train was operating a Sant Vicenç de Calders – Barcelona França service on the R2 line.

The train involved was an electric multiple unit of RENFE Class 465, number 210M. Witnesses stated that the train did not brake on entering the station. Fifty-six people were injured, five seriously. Eighteen people were taken to hospital. Victims were taken to four different hospitals in Barcelona.

== Investigation ==
The Administrador de Infraestructuras Ferroviarias (ADIF) opened an investigation into the accident. The Comisión de Investigación de Accidentes Ferroviarios (CIAF) is also responsible for investigating railway accidents in Spain. Its staff were seen on site following the accident.

On the day of the accident, it was reported that the most recent maintenance checks on the train had been completed shortly before the event. in addition, the train driver was found not to have been under the influence of drugs or alcohol. The train event recorder was recovered from the train.

The official CIAF investigation found that the track, signalling system and buffer stop at Estació de França were all functioning correctly at the time of the accident. The investigation also indicated that the train's maintenance records showed no defects relevant to the crash.

The CIAF ultimately attributed the cause of the accident to human factors, specifically delayed manual braking by the driver.
