= Ball del Sant Crist de Salomó =

Ball del Sant Crist
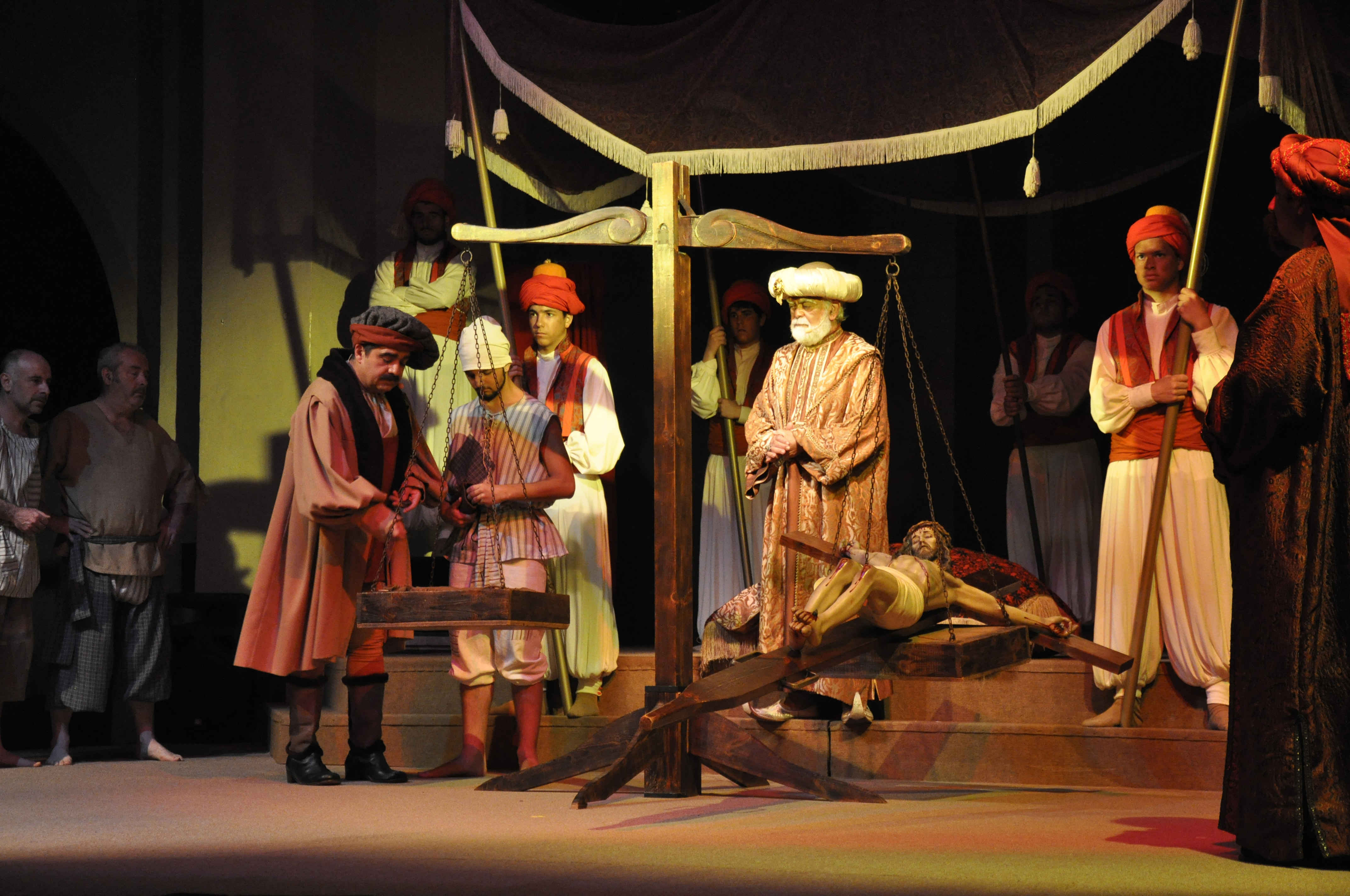
- Moment of the Weighing of the Holy Christ
- Author: Unknown
- Language: Catalan
- Genre: Drama
- Set in: Salomó (Spain), Algiers (Algeria)
- Publication place: Spain
- Website: https://www.balldelsantcrist.cat/

The Dance of Saint Christ of Salomó (Catalan: Ball Parlat del Sant Crist de Salomó) from Salomó is a Catalan medieval theater spectacle declared a Traditional Festival of National Interest on May 18, 1999, by the Generalitat de Catalunya. The Ball del Sant Crist combines theater, dance, and light and belongs to the genre of spoken dances, which have a long tradition in the regions of Camp de Tarragona. It stages legendary events that have been preserved by popular tradition to this day.

Originally, the Ball Parlat del Sant Crist de Salomó was performed outdoors as a street spectacle. Since 1972, under the guidance of the Institut del Teatre de Barcelona, it has been performed in the church. The performances take place on the first four Sundays of May at noon, and the seats are numbered.

== History and legend ==
The Sant Crist de Salomó is at the center of an indissoluble amalgam of stories that blend legend and history, permeating the history of the town and its artistic, associative, and cultural reality today. Often, one thing leads to another: the Nin lineage, the Chapel, and the Ball del Sant Crist, Cal Cadernal, and much of the historical events cannot be explained outside a context in which each is a link in the same chain.

=== The legend ===
The legend tells that the merchant Josep Nin, one of the oldest members of the Nin lineage in Salomó, rescued the image of a Crucified Christ that a Muslim merchant in Algiers had held since time immemorial. Josep Nin had decided to go and buy a load of wheat in the Maghreb due to the famine that was affecting the region, caused by a series of poor harvests due to drought. Upon discovering the Crucifix, Josep made its rescue his top priority. Achieved with great effort, it was brought to Salomó, where, given the miracles and wonders it was capable of working, it was declared the patron saint and protector of the town.

The acquisition was the result of a miracle. Mahomet, the Algerian merchant, refused to part with the Image and only agreed to sell it in exchange for its weight in silver. But the scale balanced so that thirty coins were counted. Believing himself the victim of fraud, alleging witchcraft, Mahomet refused to fulfill the deal, which led Josep Nin to resort to the justice of the sultan, who ruled in his favor. After overcoming one final desperate attempt by Mahomet to retain the Crucifix, Josep Nin boarded it, along with the wheat, to undertake the journey back to Salomó, which they completed in a single day. They disembarked in Altafulla and were immediately transported to the church in Salomó.

Thus was born the halo of a prodigious Image capable of working the most unlikely miracles, and Salomó became an important center of devotion and attraction for pilgrims. They came mainly from the regions of Penedès and Camp de Tarragona, especially from the coastal towns. The religious fervor awakened by the image was reflected in numerous pilgrimages aimed at venerating the Image.

=== The history ===
The Ball del Sant Crist is a mixture of legendary episodes and historical events, and it is almost impossible to distinguish the fine line that separates them. Nevertheless, a large amount of archival documentation proves the existence of the Nin lineage and its connection to the Sant Crist de Salomó and everything related to it.

Miquel Aymamí states that Josep Nin made his will on Sunday, July 29, 1607, in which he decided to ask the Bishop of Barcelona for permission to install a family pantheon near the Sant Crist and promised to perpetually feed an oil lamp with the oil from his crops. Although this document was burned with the rest of the parish records in 1936, subsequent documentation proves the fulfillment of these clauses and confirms their veracity. In 1707, Joan de Nin ordered to be buried in the pantheon of his ancestors, located in the parish church of Salomó; and yet, in the sale of the Nin's patrimony to the Fontanilles in 1709, it was ordered in writing: "And let the buyer know that in addition to said censuses, tithes, taxes, and other charges, he must make a lamp burn perpetually, day and night, which is in front of the Image of the Holy Christ of the Chapel that is built and constructed in the Parish Church of the said town of Salamó, as well as in the way that the late Joan de Nin and his ancestors had it burned from their own oil, whether it is by obligation, devotion, or otherwise." The existence of a provisional chapel in the church of Salomó dedicated to the Sant Crist is also irrefutable, according to documents from the Diocesan Archive of Barcelona.

From these dates - the second half of the 16th century - the Crist de Salomó became the nerve center of intense activity that projected into various fields. Chaplaincies were established, and the "Confraternity of the Sant Crist de Salomó," whose statutes were approved by the Bishop of Barcelona in 1691, was founded.

Probably, it was through the initiatives of the Confraternity that a great deal of literary and artistic activity took place. Popular tradition was translated, first of all, into the composition of songs in honor of the Sant Crist. The first printed copies date from the mid-18th century, and the high demand for them necessitated many printings: more than 35 editions to date. The lyrics are a summary of the oral tradition.

Therefore, the popular literature of the oral tradition of the legend was put into writing in the songs and later adapted to be performed as a dramatic work in the genre of "Balls Parlats" (spoken dances): the "Ball del Sant Crist de Salomó," written by Marc Fuster of Valls around 1840. In 1843, Josep Cardona, the secretary of Salomó, made a handwritten copy of it, which is the oldest preserved version.

== The Ball Parlat del Sant Crist de Salomó ==
The spoken dance is a type of street performance that combines dance - music and choreography - and theatrical elements - dramatized texts, scenery, and plot. The Ball del Sant Crist de Salomó is a hagiographic spoken dance, and it stages the narration of the rescue of the Crucifix by the merchant Josep Nin. A narrator introduced the story, and then the actors reenacted the scenes; the performance closed with the devil's speech, the purpose of which was to collect funds from the audience.

The performances began in the mid-19th century and were intermittent, no less than once a decade, but without a fixed regularity. During the 20th century, we have information about performances in the years 1901, 1911, 1925, 1939, 1940, 1941, 1954, and 1965. Since 1972, they have become annual events. In 1992, the Ball del Sant Crist was performed in the incomparable setting of the Cathedral of Tarragona as part of the commemoration of the 900th anniversary of the Metropolitan See. It has been the only performance outside Salomó in its more than a century-old history.

=== The dramatized text ===
The text of this spectacle of medieval origins has undergone various versifications, both handwritten and printed, in Catalan and also in Spanish. The described initial structure changed over the years. One of the most significant changes was the composition by Mossèn Marçal Martínez, the rector of Salomó, for the performances of 1940 and 1941. Based on this version, he adapted another one, significantly reduced in the number of scenes. To maintain the integrity of the story, the device of introducing narrating chroniclers who intervened at the beginning of the play, intermitted in their presence, and closed it with an epilogue was used.

The premiere of this version took place in 1972 and was part of a deep structural revision of the show, at the urging of such prominent personalities as Fabià Puigserver and Iago Pericot from the Institut del Teatre de Barcelona. As mentioned, the performances became annual, taking place on the first four Sundays of May; the stage left the street and moved to the parish church; costumes were renewed, and technical resources and the plot were modernized. The Generalitat de Catalunya granted the Ball del Sant Crist the distinction of a Traditional Festival of National Interest in 1999. More recently, in 2010, the Generalitat de Catalunya declared the Ball del Sant Crist a Heritage Festival of National Interest.

In summary, the most remarkable aspect of the Ball del Sant Crist, for Salomó, is that it has managed to maintain a tradition of immemorial origin. To do so, it is capable of mobilizing more than a hundred people - more than a quarter of the population - becoming, at the same time, a component of cohesion and identification for the entire town, promoting and projecting externally, contributing to the enrichment of Catalan culture. All these cultural attributes make the Ball del Sant Crist a focal point for visitors who take over from those ancient pilgrimages full of religious spirit, becoming a true showcase for Salomó abroad.
