= Valls railway station =

Railway station in Valls, Spain

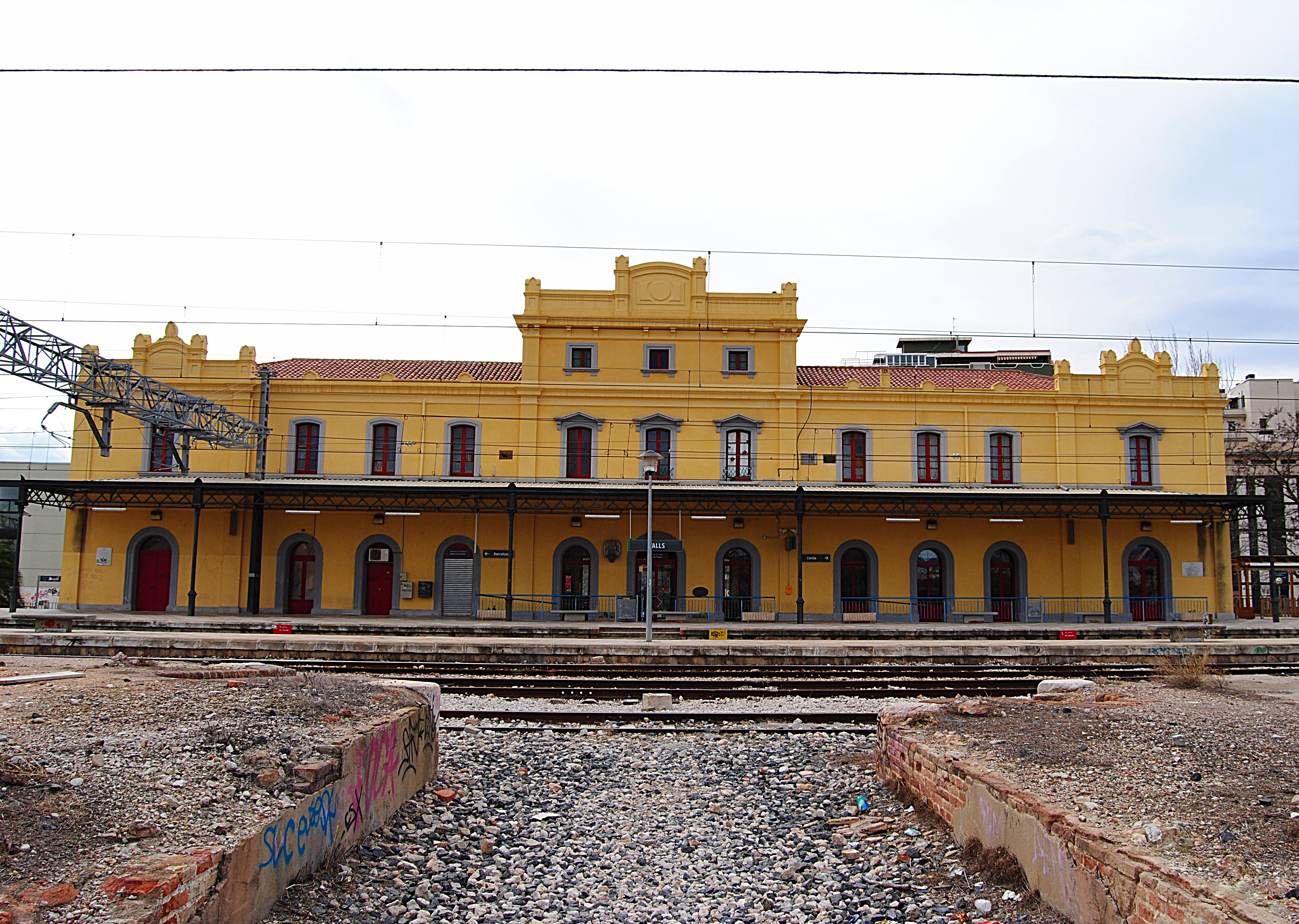
- Valls Railway Station.

General information
- Location: Plaça de l'Estació, Valls; Catalonia; Spain
- Coordinates: 41.28963°N 1.25872°E
- System: Rodalies de Catalunya commuter and regional rail station
- Owner: Adif
- Operator: Renfe Operadora

History
- Opened: 1883
Location

Valls railway station is a railway station owned by Adif, located in the town of Valls, in the Alt Camp region. The station is on the Barcelona–Vilanova–Valls railway line and serves trains on the R13 line of Rodalies de Catalunya, operated by Renfe Operadora. In 2016, the station recorded 28,000 passenger entries.

== Station building ==
The station building is protected as a Local Cultural Asset. It is a one-storey building with a symmetrical structure composed of three protruding sections and two panels connecting them. The central section is one floor higher. The floors are separated by wide impost lines shaped like pediments. The façade facing Plaça de l'Estació has three semicircular arched entrance doors, accessed by five steps. The windows are all segmental arches, with the ones in the protruding sections of the first floor highlighted by moldings forming a cornice. The crowning elements of the central and end sections are elevated and decorated with palmettes. The trackside part has a similar structure but with a flat surface, and the ground floor openings are semicircular arches. A metal canopy runs along this façade. The building is plastered and painted.

== History ==
The arrival of the railway in Valls was due to the deputy Francesc Gumà i Ferran from Vilanova, the promoter of the Valls-Vilanova-Barcelona line. The project included not only the station building but also a wide promenade connecting it with the urban center. The line was inaugurated on 31 January 1883, with the opening of the section constructed by the Companyia dels Ferrocarrils de Valls a Vilanova i Barcelona (VVB) between Calafell and Valls, one year after the opening of the line between Vilanova i la Geltrú and Calafell.

The station was once quite important, as it was a stop for several long-distance trains, including the Altaria "Triana" and the Talgo "Covadonga," among others. However, with the opening of the Madrid–Barcelona high-speed rail line, these services gradually shifted to the high-speed line, with the last being the Talgo "Covadonga," which moved to the high-speed line on 15 September 2008, marking the last day a long-distance train served Valls.

Origin/Destination	Preceding station	Rodalies de Catalunya	Following station	Origin/Destination
La Plana – Picamoixons Lleida Pirineus	La Plana -Picamoixions		Nulles- Bràfim Salomó^{1}	Sant Vicenç de Calders Barcelona-Estació de França Barcelona-Sant Andreu Comtal

1. Some regional trains do not stop at Nulles-Bràfim or Vilabella, with the next or previous stop being Salomó.
