= Vilabella railway station =

Railway station in Catalonia, Spain

Vilabella Railway Station
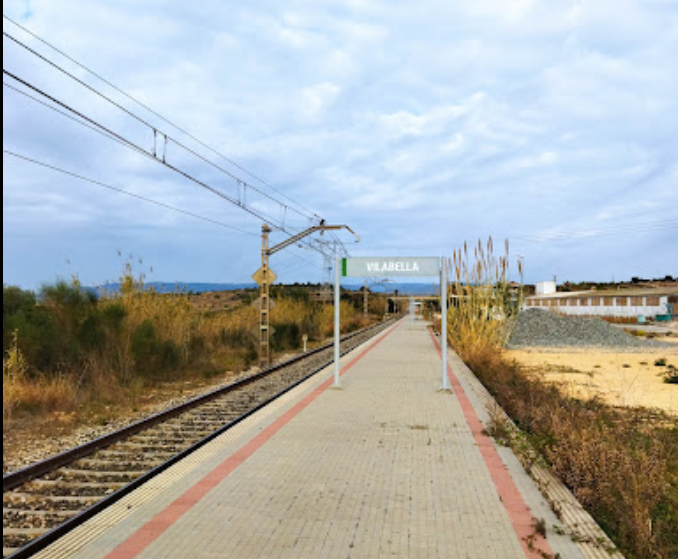
- Vilabella Railway Station.

General information
- Location: Vilabella (Alt Camp), Catalonia; Spain
- Coordinates: 41.23946°N 1.31739°E
- System: Rodalies de Catalunya commuter and regional rail station
- Owner: Adif
- Operator: Renfe Operadora

History
- Opened: 1883
Location

Vilabella is a railway station owned by ADIF located in the town of Vilabella in the Alt Camp region of Catalonia, Spain. The station is situated on the Barcelona–Vilanova–Valls railway and is served by trains of the R13 line of Rodalies de Catalunya regional services, operated by Renfe Operadora.

This station on the Vilanova and Valls line entered service in 1883 when the section built by the Companyia dels Ferrocarrils de Valls a Vilanova i Barcelona (VVB) between Calafell and Valls was opened, one year after the opening of the line between Vilanova i la Geltrú and Calafell.

In 2016, it recorded fewer than 1,000 passengers.

== Railway services ==
Origin/Destination	Preceding station	Rodalies de Catalunya	Following station	Origin/Destination
La Plana - Picamoixons Lleida - Pirineus	Nulles-Bràfim		Salomó	Sant Vicenç de Calders Barcelona-Estació de França Barcelona-Sant Andreu Comtal

== See also ==
- Renfe Operadora
