= RT2 (Rodalies de Catalunya) =

Train service in Catalonia, Spain

Overview
- Service type: Commuter rail
- Status: Operational
- Locale: Tarragona province
- First service: 20 March 2014
- Current operator(s): Renfe Operadora

Route
- Termini: Port Aventura; L'Arboç
- Stops: 7
- Distance travelled: 55 km (34 mi)
- Average journey time: 41 min
- Service frequency: Every 2–4 h
- Line(s) used: Valencia-Sant Vicenç de Calders; Sant Vicenç de Calders–Vilafranca–Barcelona

Technical
- Rolling stock: Renfe Class 447 and 448 EMUs
- Track gauge: 1,668 mm (5 ft 5 21/32 in) Iberian gauge
- Electrification: 3,000 V DC overhead lines
- Track owner(s): Adif

The RT2 is a line of Rodalies de Catalunya's Tarragona commuter rail service, operated by Renfe Operadora. It links Port Aventura railway station in the Costa Daurada area with L'Arboç railway station, in Baix Penedès, through the city of Tarragona. The RT2 shares tracks for most of its length with regional rail lines R15, R16 and R17, as well as Barcelona commuter rail service line R4.

RT2 services started operating in 2014, initially running between L'Hospitalet de l'Infant and L'Arboç stations, again through Tarragona. It became the first commuter service to use the Valencia-Sant Vicenç de Calders railway, originally designed to serve regional as well as inter-city rail. On 13 January 2020, the RT2 was shortened, so that it began to operate in its current configuration. This shortening came up as a result of the opening of a new inland line between Tarragona and L'Ametlla de Mar, and the closure of the coastal line beyond Port Aventura.

== List of stations ==
The following table lists the name of each station served by line RT2 in order from west to east; the station's service pattern offered by RT2 trains; the transfers to other Rodalies de Catalunya lines, including both commuter and regional rail services; remarkable transfers to other transport systems; the municipality in which each station is located; and the fare zone each station belongs to according to the Autoritat del Transport Metropolità (ATM Àrea de Barcelona) fare-integrated public transport system and Rodalies de Catalunya's own fare zone system for Barcelona commuter rail service lines.

#	Terminal of a service
*	Transfer station to other transport systems
#*	Transfer station and terminal
●	Station served by all trains running through it
○	Limited service station

Station	Service	Rodalies de Catalunya transfers	Other transfers	Municipality	Fare zone		
Station	Service	Rodalies de Catalunya transfers	Other transfers	Municipality	ATM AdT	ATM AdB	Rod
Port Aventura#	●	R17	—	Salou	1	—	—
Tarragona*	●	R14, R15, R16, R17, RT1	Renfe Operadora-operated long-distance rail services	Tarragona	1	—	—
Altafulla-Tamarit	●	R14, R15, R16, R17	—	Altafulla	1	—	—
Torredembarra	●	R14, R15, R16, R17	—	Torredembarra	1	—	—
Sant Vicenç de Calders	●	R2 Sud, R4, R13, R14, R15, R16, R17	—	El Vendrell	2, 4	6A	6
El Vendrell	●	R4	—	El Vendrell	2, 4	6A	6
L'Arboç#	●	R4	—	L'Arboç	2, 4	5B	6
