= Salomó =

- Municipality
- Coat of arms

- Location in Catalonia
- Coordinates: 41°13′47″N 1°22′30″E
- Country: Spain
- Community: Catalonia
- Province: Tarragona
- Comarca: Tarragonès

Government
  - Mayor: Antoni Virgili Colet (2015)

Area
  - Total: 12.2 km^{2} (4.7 sq mi)
- Elevation: 158 m (518 ft)

Population (2025-01-01)
  - Total: 519
  - Density: 42.5/km^{2} (110/sq mi)
- Demonym: Salomonenc
- Postal code: 43885
- Website: salomo.cat

Salomó (Catalan pronunciation: [səluˈmo]) is a municipality in the shire of Tarragonès, Catalonia, Spain. It has a population of 519 (register office, 2025).

Well known for the "Ball del Sant Crist de Salomó" of Salomó, a medieval play declared a "National Traditional Festival of Interest" by the Government of Catalonia.

== Geography ==
Salomó is a municipality located in the northeastern sector of Tarragonès. It borders the Alt Camp to the north and west, and the Baix Penedès to the east. It is located in the triangle formed by the cities of Tarragona, Valls, and el Vendrell, about 20 km from each one. It has access to the nearby highways AP-7 and AP-2, and has a railway station.

The population center is located at the bottom of a small basin and is surrounded by the mountain of Montferri, the "Roca Roja" (red rock), the ranges of Bonastre, and the High Range. The Gaià River forms the western boundary of the municipal term, excavating a deep valley.

== History ==
The area was already inhabited in prehistoric times, as highlighted by different materials like stone, bone, ceramics, and metal excavated from the Vergerars Cave (or Cova Fonda), which can be dated to the third and second millennia BC, in the Chalcolithic period.

The oldest written documents date back to the beginning of the 11th century, when the area was part of the eastern sector of the Castle of Castellví de la Marca. In the early 13th century, Guillema de Castellvell donated the area to the Benedictine priory of Santa Maria de Banyeres. Mention is also made of the church. Salomó received a protection letter from King James I, confirmed later by John I. Throughout the modern age, the area was jointly ruled by the Banyeres priory and the Copons lineage.

In the second half of the 14th century, Salomó was directly affected by the Third Carlist War, a cholera epidemic (1885), and the phylloxera plague (1892).

During the 20th century, the population of Salomó has significantly declined due to rural exodus. The eight hundred inhabitants it had at the beginning of the century have been reduced by half.

== Economy ==
Over the last decades, the active population of the village has undergone a significant transformation, with a decrease in those engaged in the primary sector and an increase in industrial and tertiary labor.

However, agriculture remains one of the main sources of wealth in Salomó. The dominant crops are grapes and olives, although carob trees and palm trees are also cultivated.

Industrial and service activity focuses on traditional crafts and workshops (sawmills, construction, mechanics, carpentry), various factories (paints, caps, fertilizers, swimwear), a furniture showroom, an industrial rabbit slaughterhouse, as well as several restaurants and the establishments that supply them (butchers, bakeries, grocery stores, and bars).

== Heritage ==
=== Church of Santa Maria ===
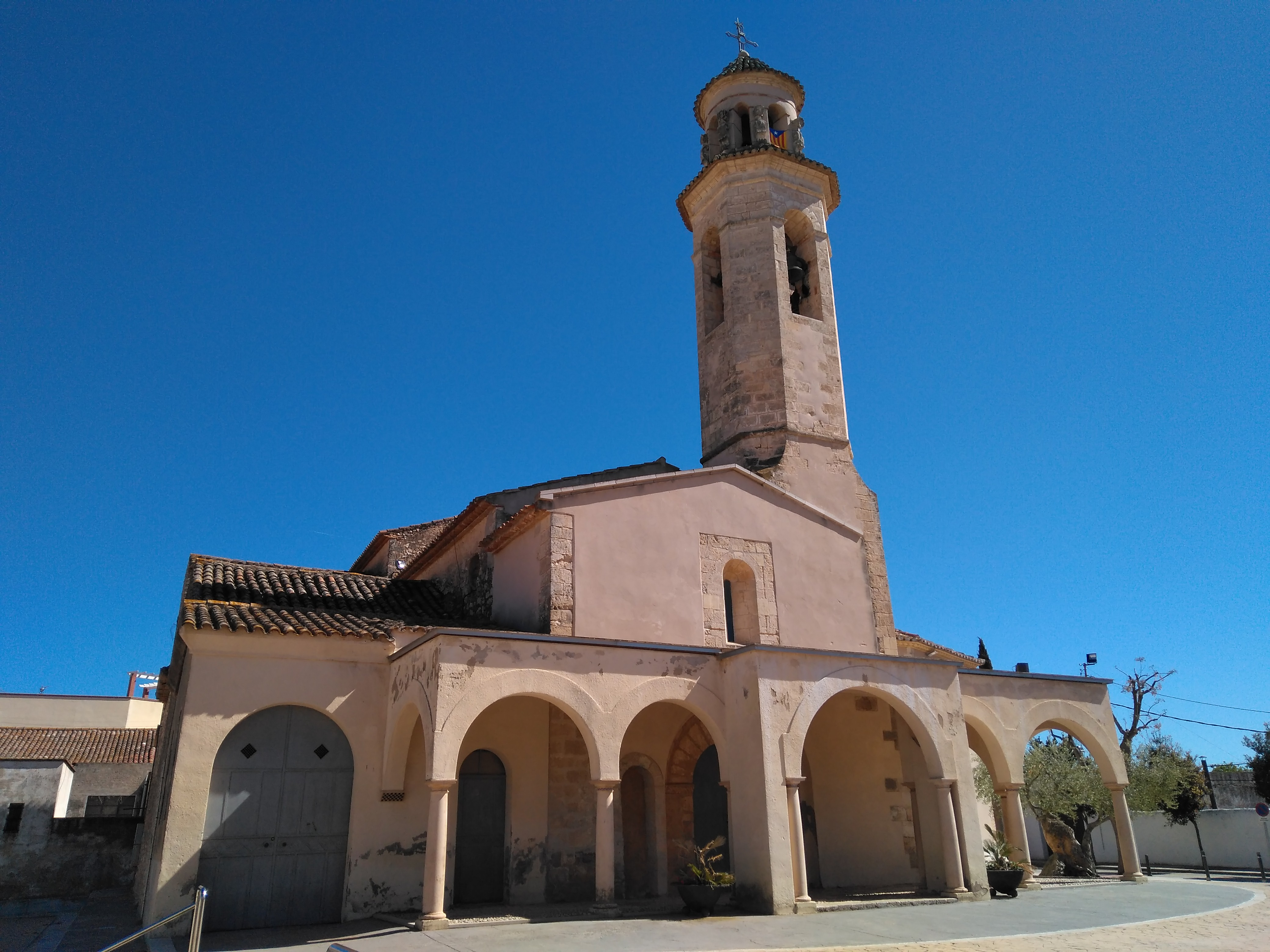
Church of Santa Maria de Salomó

The parish church of Santa Maria is documented from the 13th century and displays a series of Romanesque elements. The entrance consists of a semicircular arch with checkerboard decoration on the impost blocks. There is also a double-lancet window with a semicircular arch, part of the cornice, and various decorative elements on the facade: embossed castles and various Greek and Maltese crosses.

=== Chapel of Sant Crist ===
In the southern sector of the church of Santa Maria stands the Chapel of Sant Crist, built in the early 18th century, in Baroque style. It has a Greek cross plan, and the crossing is covered by an elegant semispherical dome topped by a vaulted lantern. The pendentives feature reliefs of the four evangelists. It is decorated with mural paintings and canvases by the Vallenc painter Pons i Monravà (17th-18th centuries), who was artistically trained in Italy and affiliated with the tenebrist school (Baroque style).

=== Cal Cadernal ===
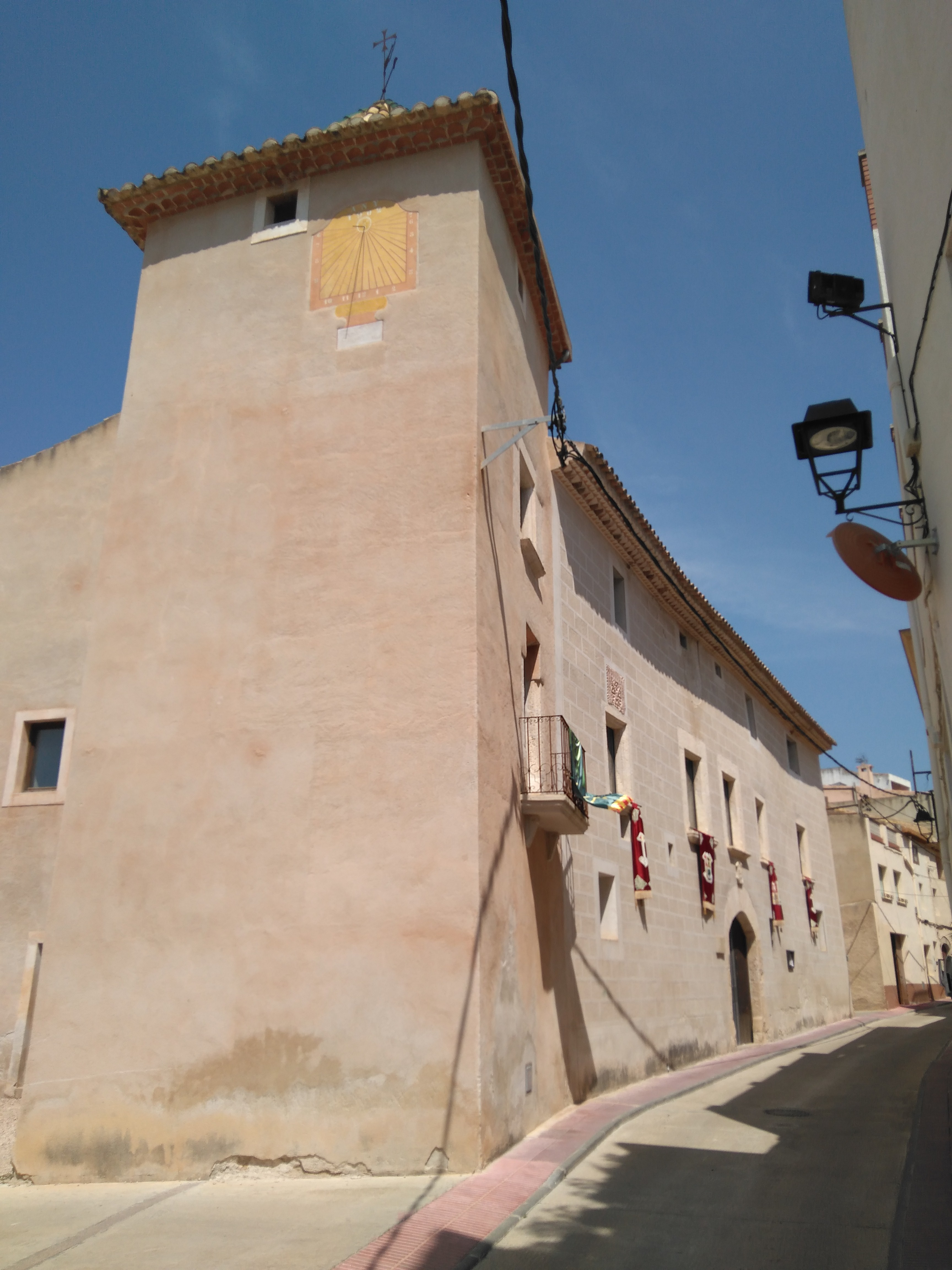
Cal Cadernal

Among the civil buildings, Cal Cadernal stands out, the ancestral home of the Nin family, Salomó traders closely linked to the legend and history of the Holy Christ. The mansion, of late medieval origin, underwent significant expansion and renovations, especially in the century XVII. At that time, it acquired its current appearance, with notable doors and windows on the east and west facades. The sides and the back are surrounded by a merloned wall of nearly two hundred meters, also from the century XVII.

=== Town Hall and Old Schools ===
The complex formed by the Town Hall and the old schools is the result of a project by the renowned modernist architect César Martinell. The construction took place between 1924 and 1925, enabling the urbanization of the urban nucleus area that connects to the road.

== Festivals and Folk Culture ==
The most relevant festival is the Major Festival in honor of the Holy Christ, patron of Salomó, celebrated on May 3, commemorating the Invention of the Holy Cross. The festival was established in the late XVII, and the solemn Blessed Bread Procession stands out. In late August, during a weekend, the Summer Festivals or August Festivals take place, characterized by being popular and playful. On August 16, the votive feast of Saint Roch, protector against the plague, is celebrated. It was established by the local authorities in 1885, in memory of the cholera epidemic that affected the population in July and August of that year. The Three Kings Parade on the afternoon of January 5 concludes the Christmas festive cycle. Their Majesties the Magi of the East distribute toys to the children, from house to house, from balcony to balcony, to the rhythm of a song unique to the village.

=== The Speaking Dance of the Holy Christ ===
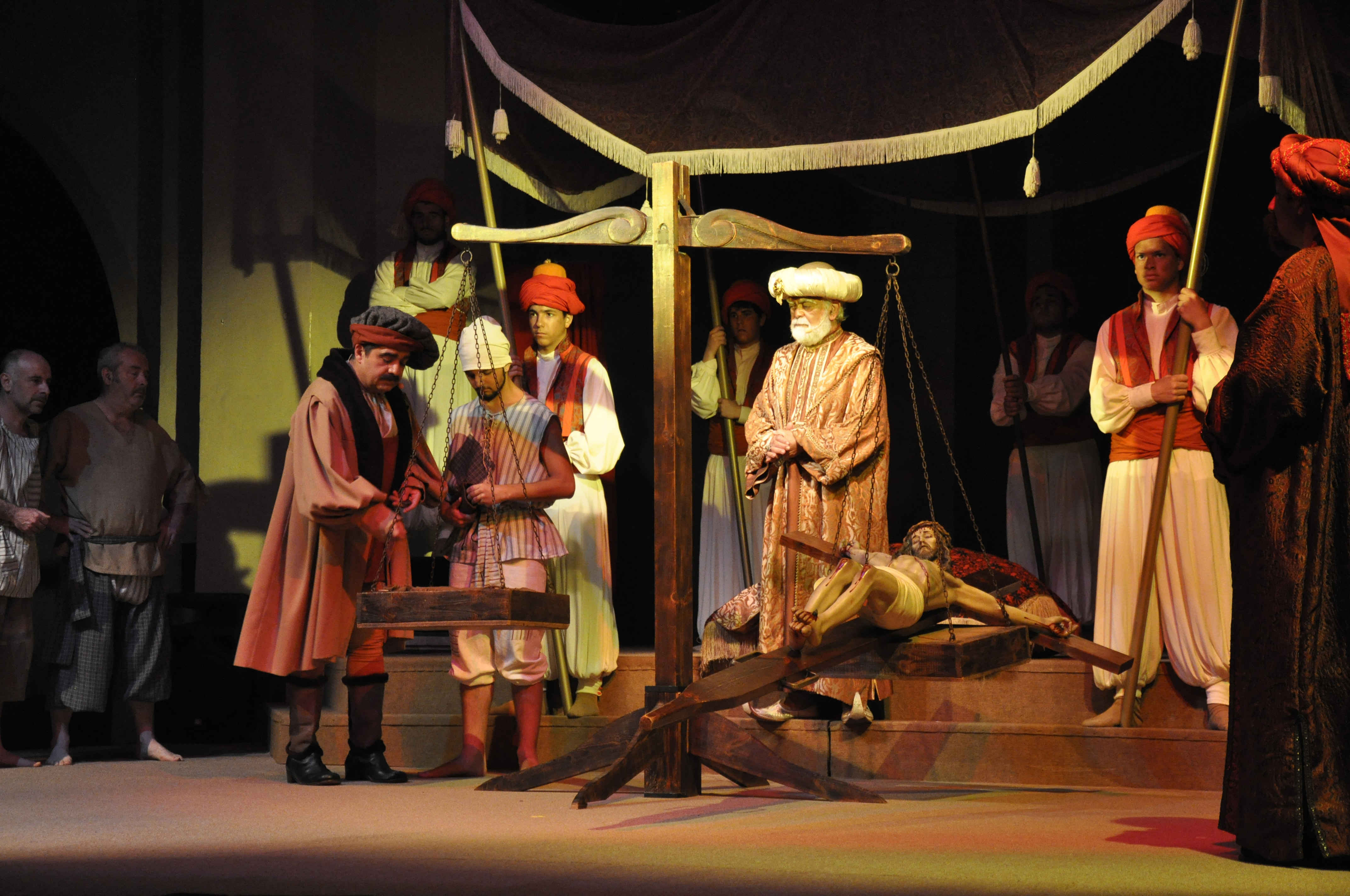
Dance of the Holy Christ of Salomó: weighing of the Crucifix in front of the royal authorities.

Every year, during the first four Sundays of May at noon, Salomó performs the Dance of the Holy Christ of Salomó, a "speaking dance" that narrates a centuries-old story surrounded by legend through dramatic and choreographic scenes. This story recounts that a Salomó merchant, Josep Nin, from Cal Cadernal, brought a miraculous Crucifix to the town, acquired from an Algerian merchant in exchange for silver after many tribulations. The origin of this story can be placed in the mid-century XVI. Devotion to the image spread to neighboring regions, and believers traveled to Salomó in pilgrimage to honor the patron. A brotherhood in his honor was established (1691), and hymns were composed (the oldest dating from the mid-century XVI). From oral tradition and hymns, the dramatic text of the Dance was born, written in the mid-century XIX, and has been performed continuously since then.

== Sister cities ==
Salomó is twinned with the towns of Bree (Flanders) and Volpago (Italy). Every two years, a meeting takes place between the three villages to learn about and enrich the culture and customs of the different regions.
