= La Plana - Picamoixons railway station =

Railway station in Valls, Spain

La Plana – Picamoixons
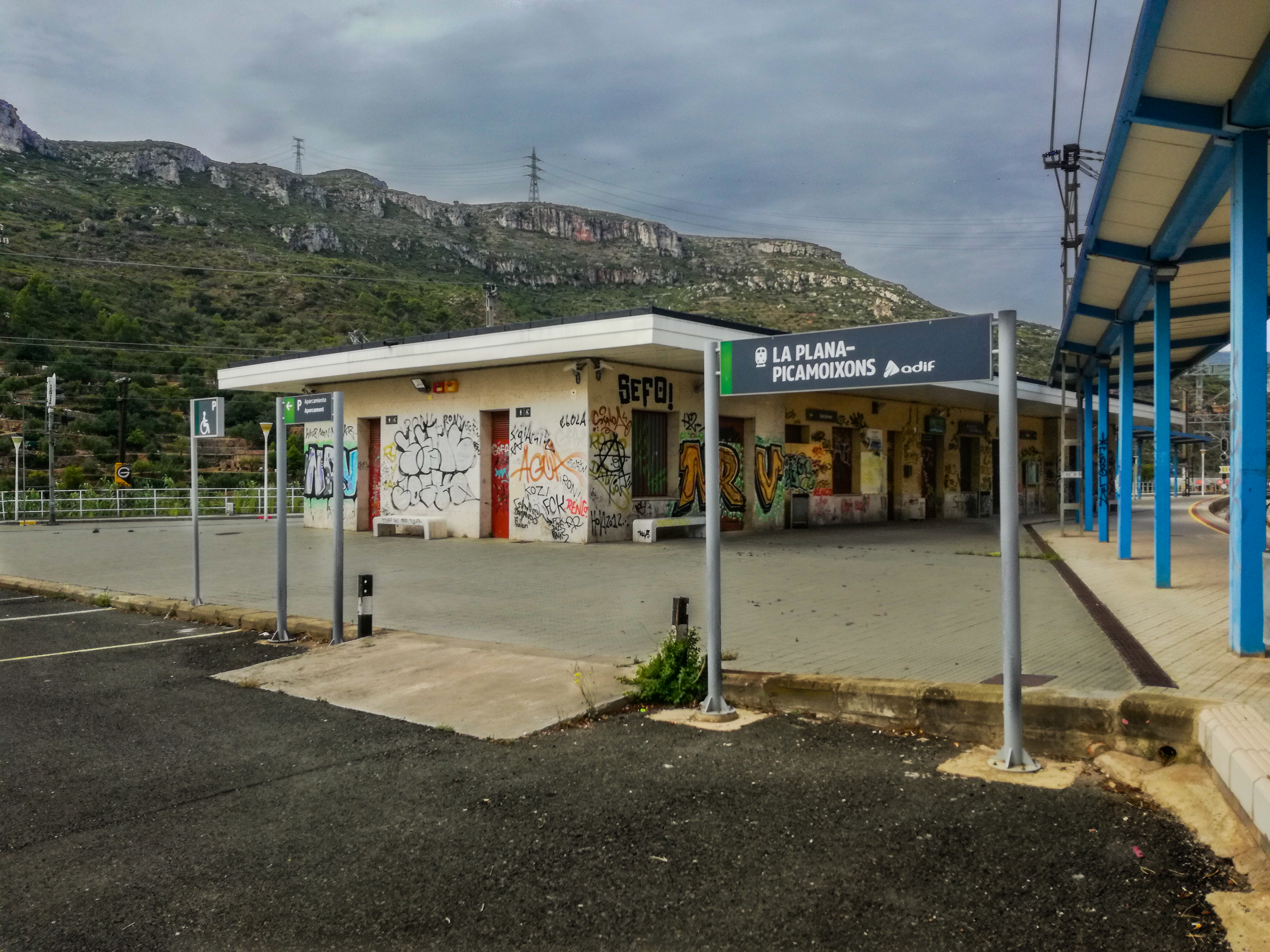
- La Plana – Picamoixons Railway Station.

General information
- Location: Valls (Alt Camp), Catalonia; Spain
- Coordinates: 41.30604°N 1.19493°E
- System: Rodalies de Catalunya commuter and regional rail station
- Owner: Adif
- Operator: Renfe Operadora

History
- Opened: 1863
Location

La Plana – Picamoixons is a railway station owned by adif located in the town of Picamoixons in the municipality of Valls, in the comarca of Alt Camp. The station is on the Tarragona-Reus-Lleida line, and it is served by trains of the R13 and R14 lines of the Rodalies de Catalunya, operated by Renfe Operadora.

This station entered service in 1863 when the section built by the Reus to Montblanc Railway Company between the Reus (1856) and Montblanc went into operation.

Despite not being close to a significant population center, the station is of certain importance, as it is here that the line to Lleida bifurcates, one branch going to Reus and Tarragona and the other to Valls and Sant Vicenç de Calders.

In 2016, the station recorded the entry of 6,000 passengers.

== Line ==
Line 230 (Tarragona – Plana-Picamoixons – Lleida)

== Railway services ==
Origin/Destination	Preceding station	Rodalies de Catalunya	Following station	Origin/Destination
Terminal¹ Lleida – Pirineus	La Riba Montblanc²		Valls	Sant Vicenç de Calders Barcelona-Estació de França Barcelona-Sant Andreu Comtal
Terminal¹ Lleida – Pirineus	La Riba Montblanc²		Alcover	Sant Vicenç de Calders Barcelona-Estació de França Barcelona-Sant Andreu Comtal

1. Some trains from R13 line originating from La Plana – Picamoixons and destination to Sant Vicenç de Calders.
2. Some regional trains do not stop at La Riba or Vilaverd, with the next or previous stop being Montblanc.

== See also ==
- Renfe Operadora
