= Barcelona França railway station =

Railway station in Barcelona, Spain

Coordinates: 41°23′02″N 2°11′10″E

Barcelona Estació de França
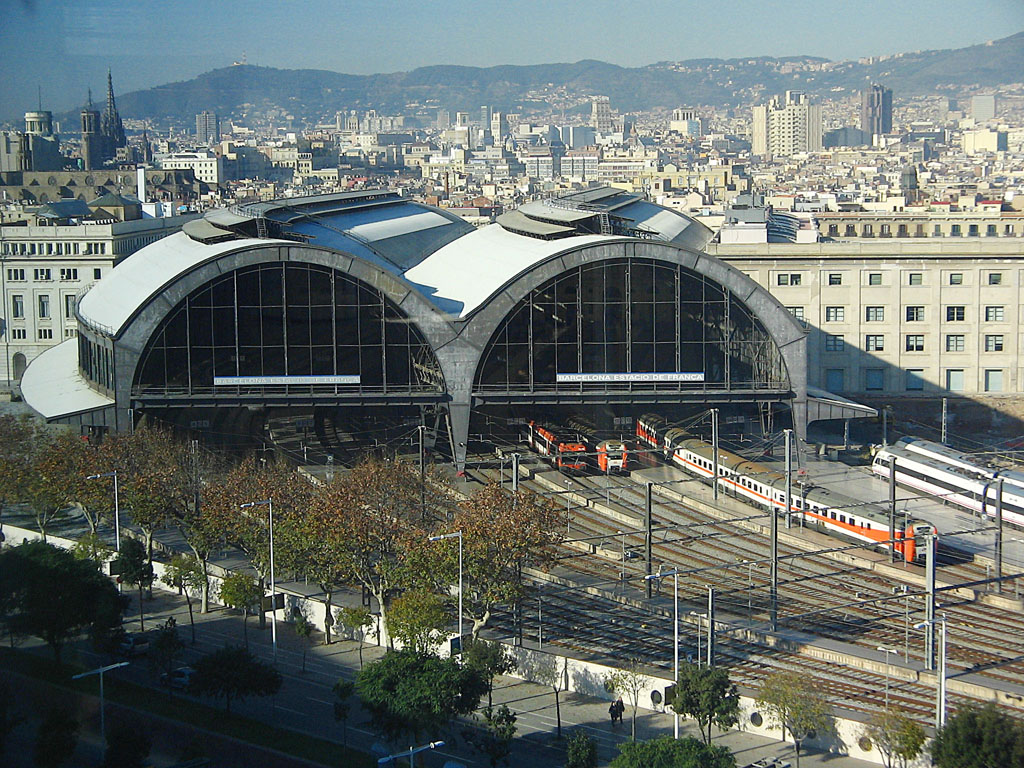
- Aerial view

General information
- Location: Avinguda del Marquès de l'Argentera, Barcelona, Catalonia; Spain
- Owner: Adif
- Operator: Renfe
- Lines: Madrid-Barcelona (PK 684.8); Barcelona–Cerbère railway (PK 0.0)
- Tracks: 13

Construction
- Structure type: At-grade
- Accessible: Yes

History
- Opened: 1848

Passengers
- 2018: 2,339,367 ( )
Services
Preceding station	Renfe Operadora	Following station
Barcelona Sants towards Seville-Santa Justa	Talgo Torre del Oro	Terminus
Barcelona Passeig de Gràcia towards Zaragoza–Delicias	Media Distancia 34	Terminus
Preceding station	Rodalies de Catalunya	Following station
Barcelona Passeig de Gràcia towards Sant Vicenç de Calders	R2 Sud	Terminus
Barcelona Passeig de Gràcia towards Lleida Pirineus	R13	Terminus
Barcelona Passeig de Gràcia towards Lleida Pirineus	R14	Terminus
Barcelona Passeig de Gràcia towards Riba-roja d'Ebre	R15	Terminus
Barcelona Passeig de Gràcia towards Ulldecona-Alcanar-La Sénia or Tortosa	R16	Terminus
Barcelona Passeig de Gràcia towards Port Aventura	R17	Terminus
Location

Estació de França (Catalan pronunciation: [əstəsiˈo ðə ˈfɾansə]; Spanish: Estación de Francia; "France Station") is a major railway station in the city of Barcelona in Catalonia, Spain.

Estació de França is the second busiest railway station of the city after Barcelona-Sants in terms of regional and long-distance ridership. It may lose this status, however, with the arrival of the AVE high-speed train in Sants and the construction of Estació de la Sagrera, planned for completion at the end of 2028, that will concentrate most of the traffic.

== History ==
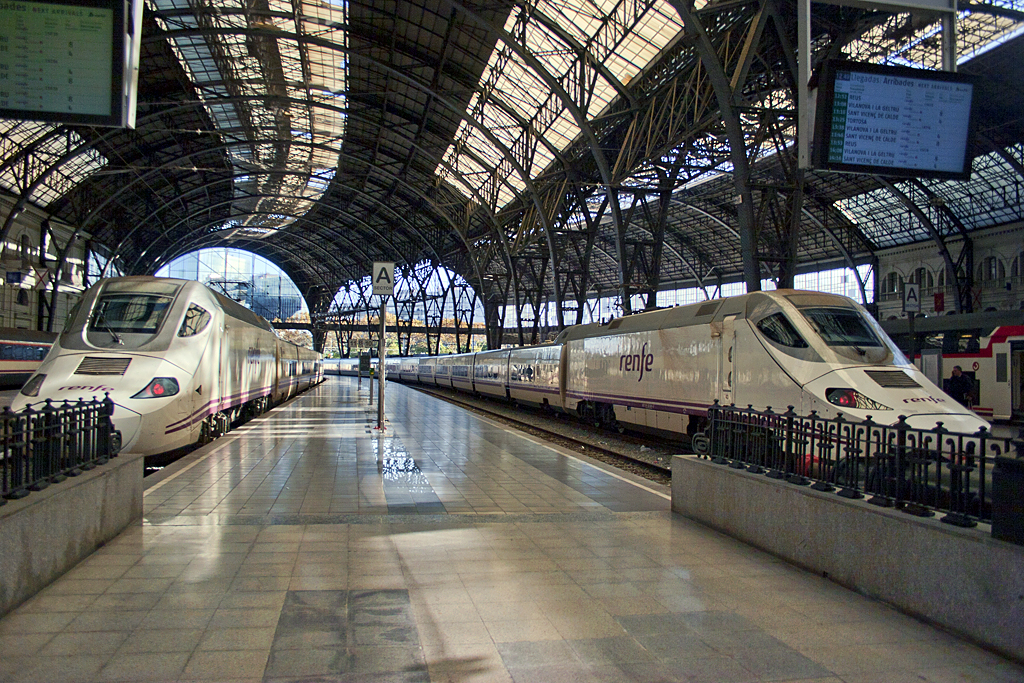
Some of the platforms

A railway station was first built here in the 19th century as the main terminus for trains arriving from France (as its name still suggests) but also for services to North East Catalonia and the Costa Brava.

Rebuilt and reopened for the 1929 Barcelona International Exposition, the two monumental buildings that make up the station were designed by the architect Pedro Muguruza and inaugurated by King Alfonso XIII. They surround the railway tracks in the shape of a 'U'. In total, the station's structure is 29 m tall and 195 m long. The station was closed for renovation between from 1988 and 1992, reopening for the Olympic Games of 1992.

== Architecture ==
It is generally seen as the city's most beautiful station. It is worth seeing in its own right for the restrained mix of classical and more modern style that is complete with decoration in marble, bronze and crystal and its modernista and art déco motifs. Over the last three decades it has been eclipsed as Barcelona's main station by the underground sprawl of Sants. Indeed, most other stations of Barcelona are at least partly underground.

The station's status as the terminus for international trains from and through France ended with the discontinuation of the overnight 'trenhotels' in 2013, which coincided with the introduction of the new high-speed daytime TGV services to Paris, Toulouse, Lyon and Marseille, all of which call at or terminate at Sants.

Part of the original building now belongs to Pompeu Fabra University, serving as its "França building".

== Lines ==
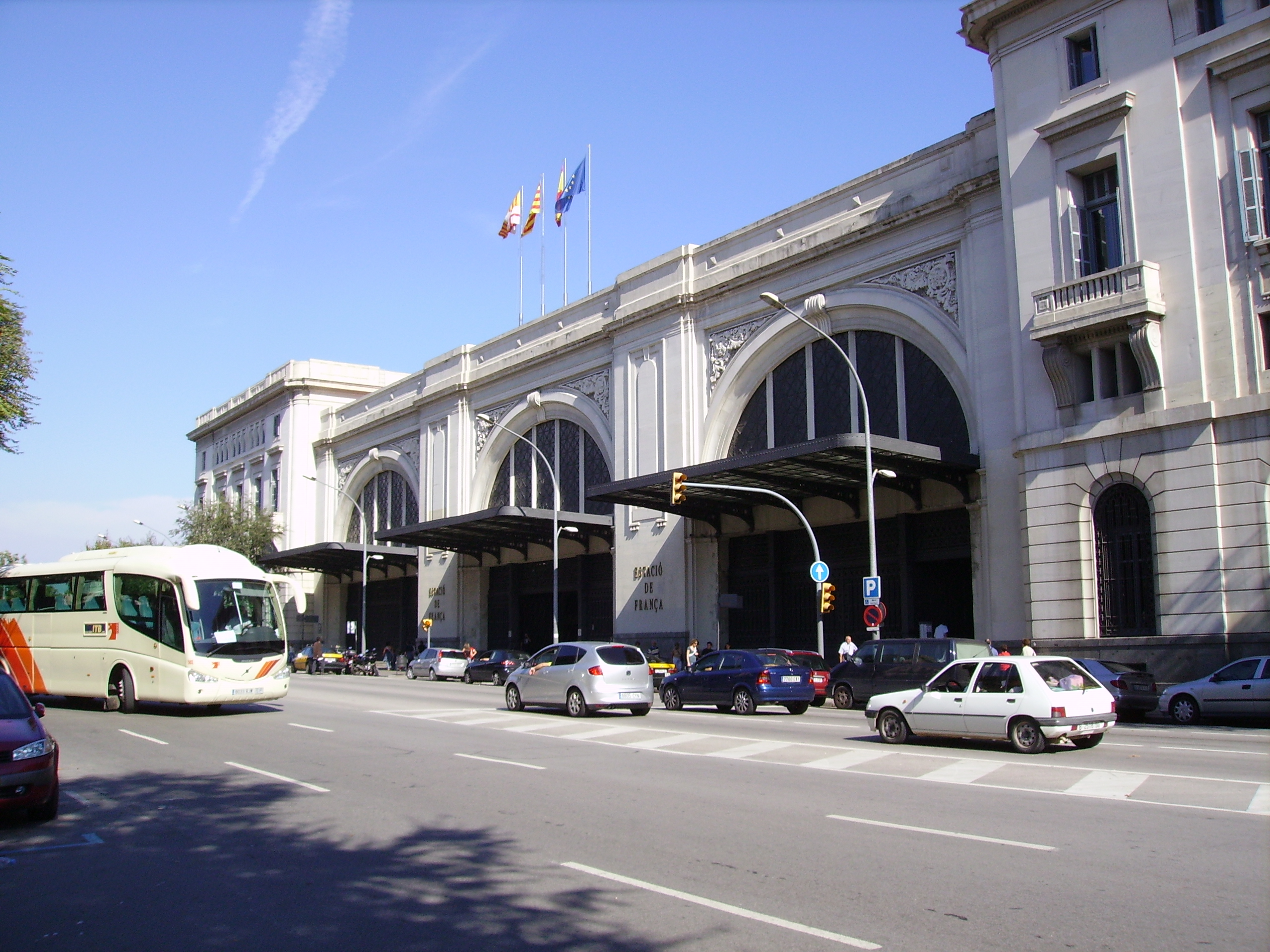
Façade

The station accommodates twelve tracks and seven platforms. It is the terminus for a number of Renfe services:

- Rodalies Barcelona: R10 - the half-hourly Barcelona International Airport train via central Barcelona (Passeig de Gràcia railway station and Sants), but suspended for AVE works, temporarily served by R2 SUD to central Barcelona (Passeig de Gràcia railway station and Sants), Viladecans, Gavà, Castelldefels, Sitges, Vilanova i la Geltrú, Calafell and Sant Vicenç de Calders
- Medium-distance (Renfe Media Distancia): Ca1, Ca3, Ca4, Ca6

The station is often also used as backup terminal when parts of the railway network are undergoing maintenance; the station received a wide variety of services during upgrades to the Aragó tunnel during winter of 2008.

== Location ==
The station is located in the east of the city, down between the docks and the zoo. Although it does not have its own metro station, it is easily accessible: directly on the R10 line through central Barcelona (Sants and Passeig de Gràcia), as well as a good five-minute walk from Barceloneta station on line 4 of the Barcelona Metro.

== Gallery ==
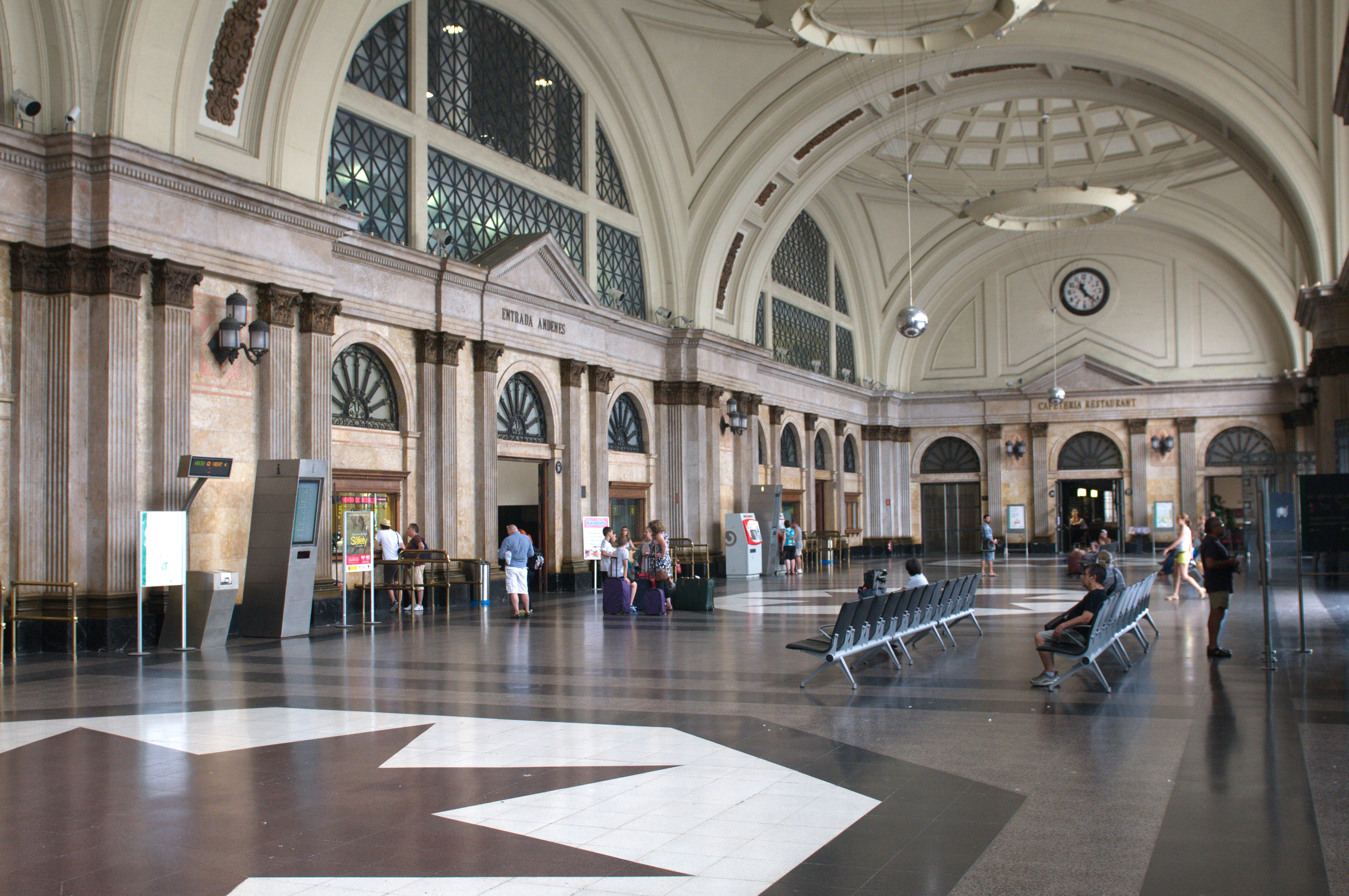
Entrance hall

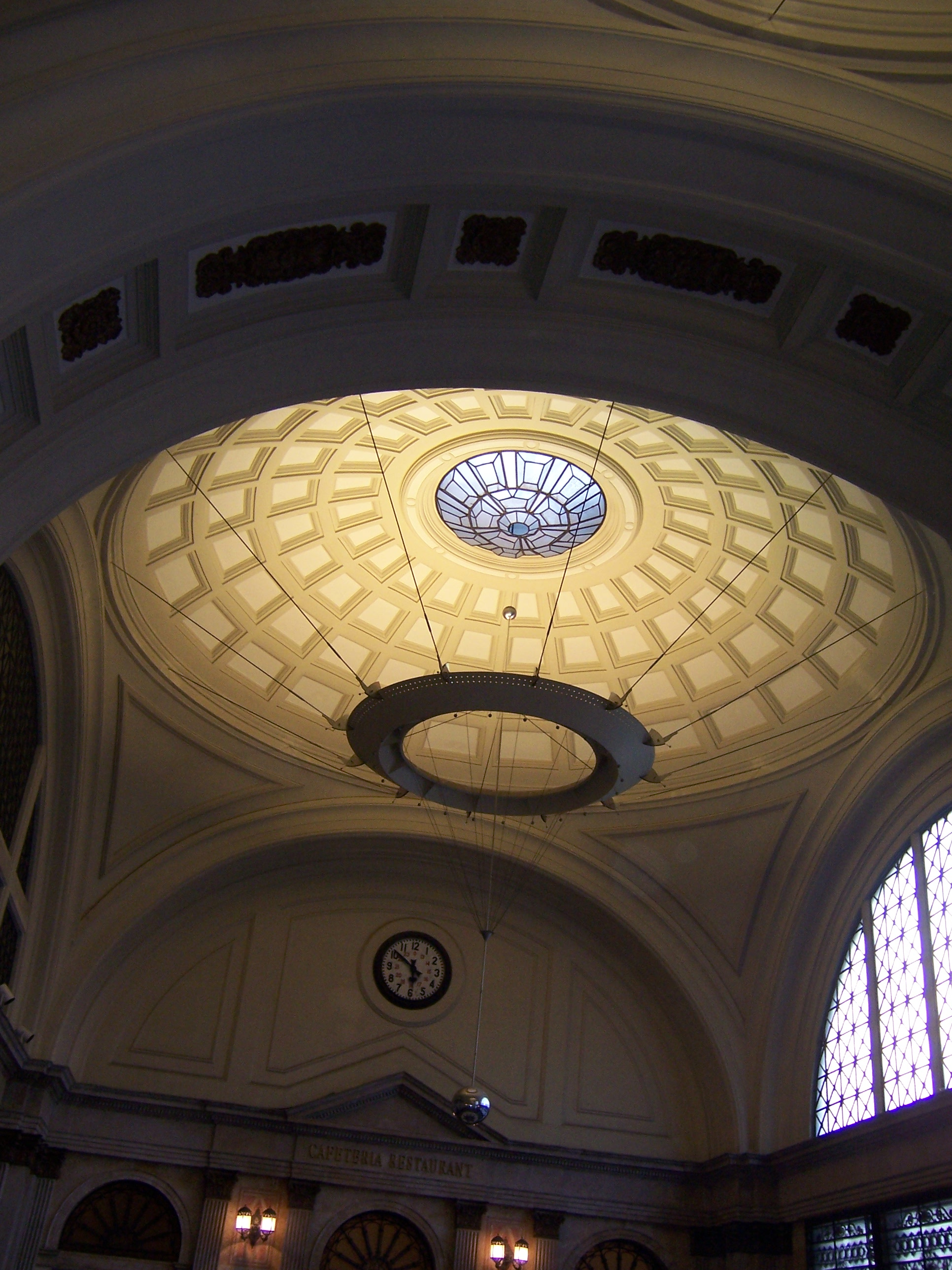
A view of the roof in the entrance hall (2006)

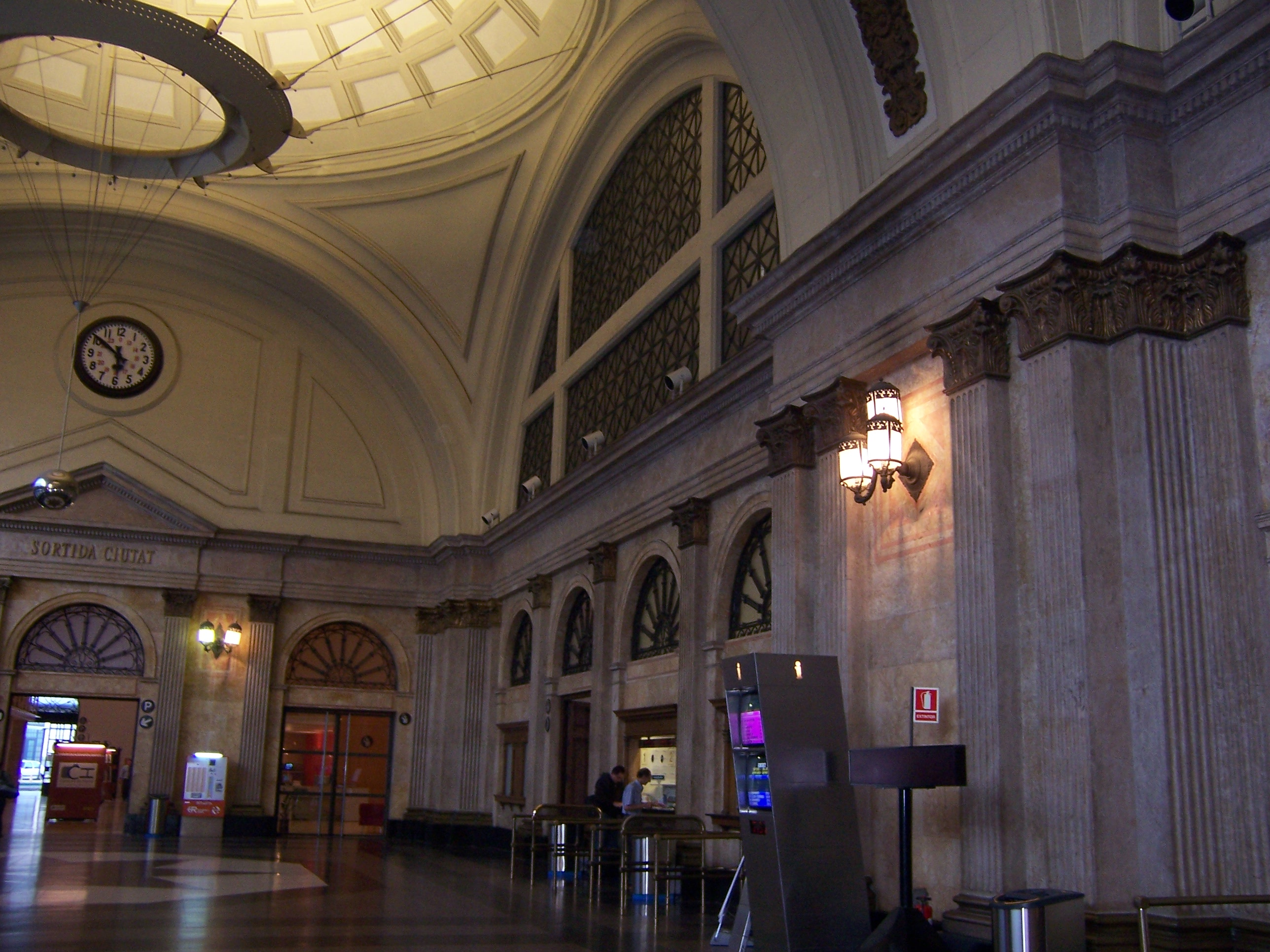
Entrance hall and ticket windows (2006)

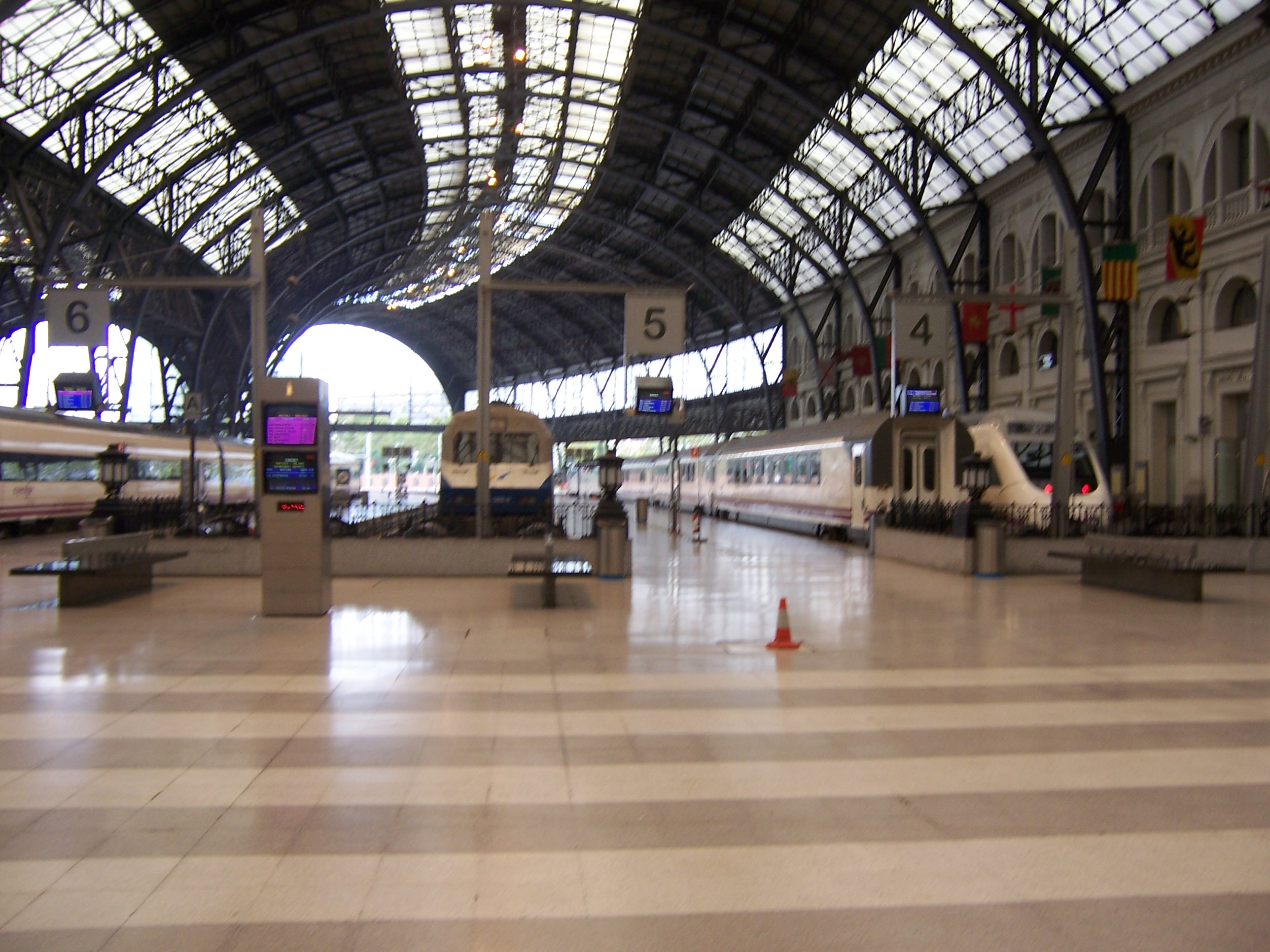
Platforms area at Barcelona Estació de França (1)

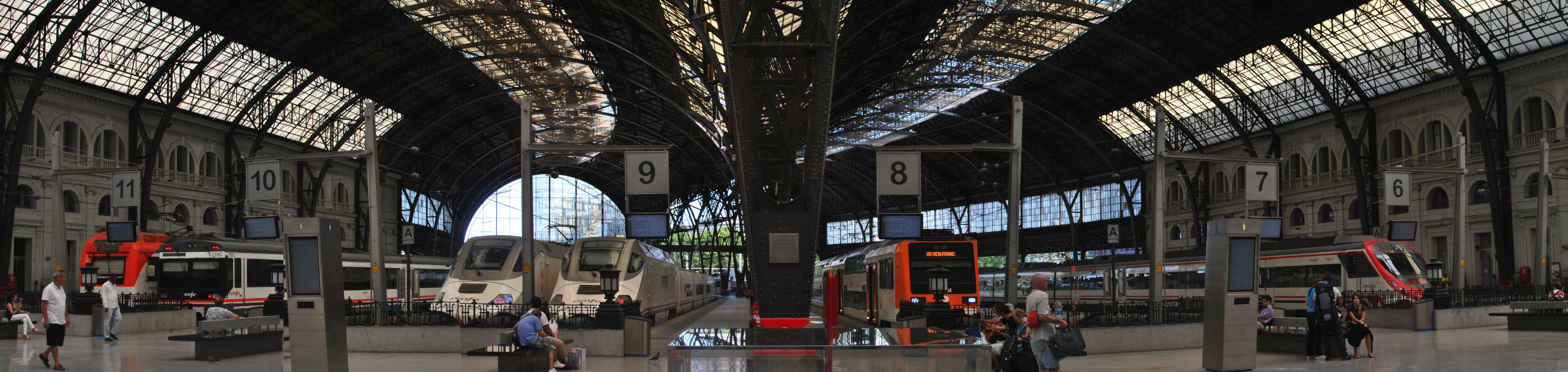
Barcelona-estacio-de-franca-station (2013)

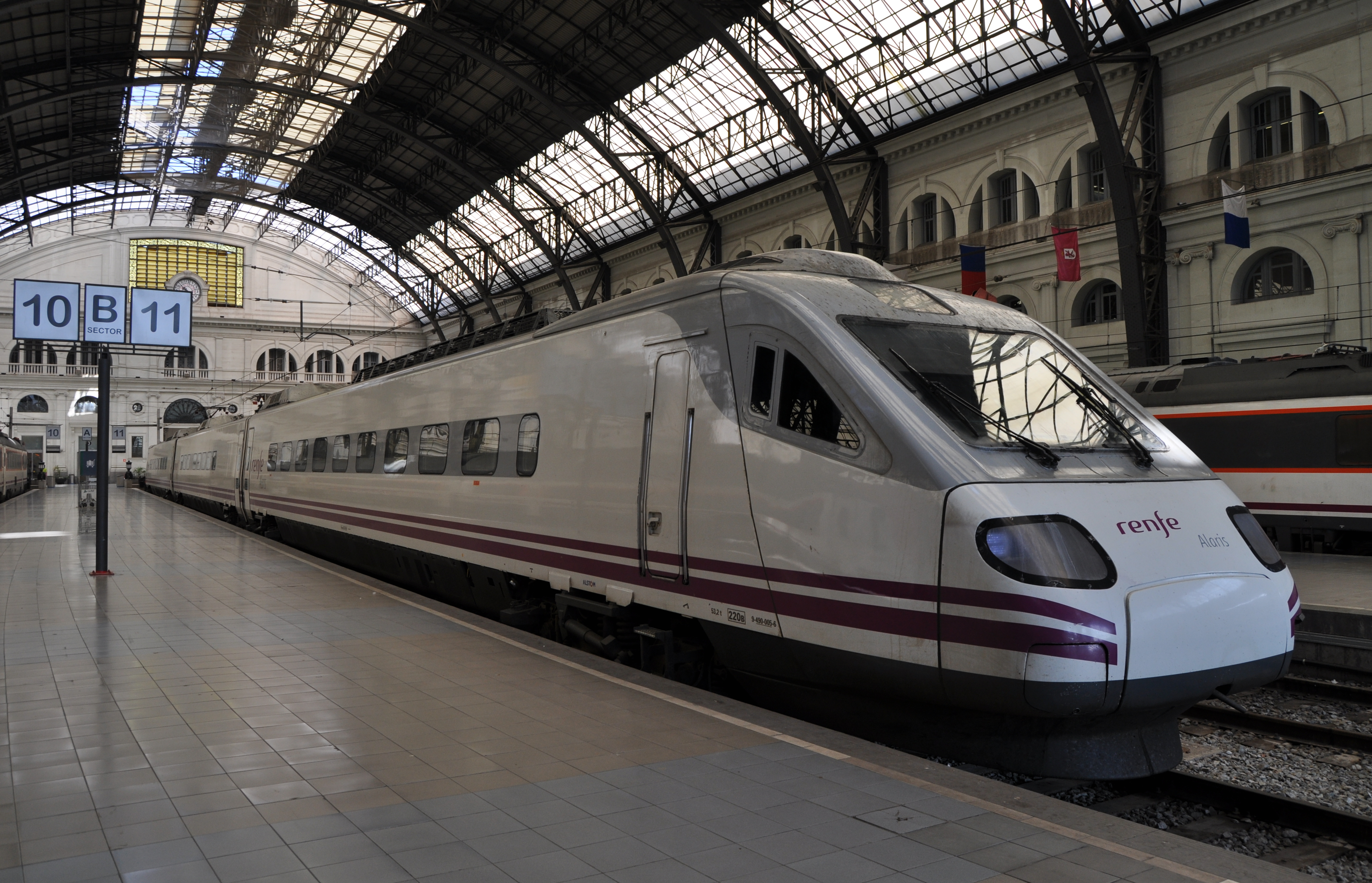
Renfe Class 490 in Barcelona França railway station

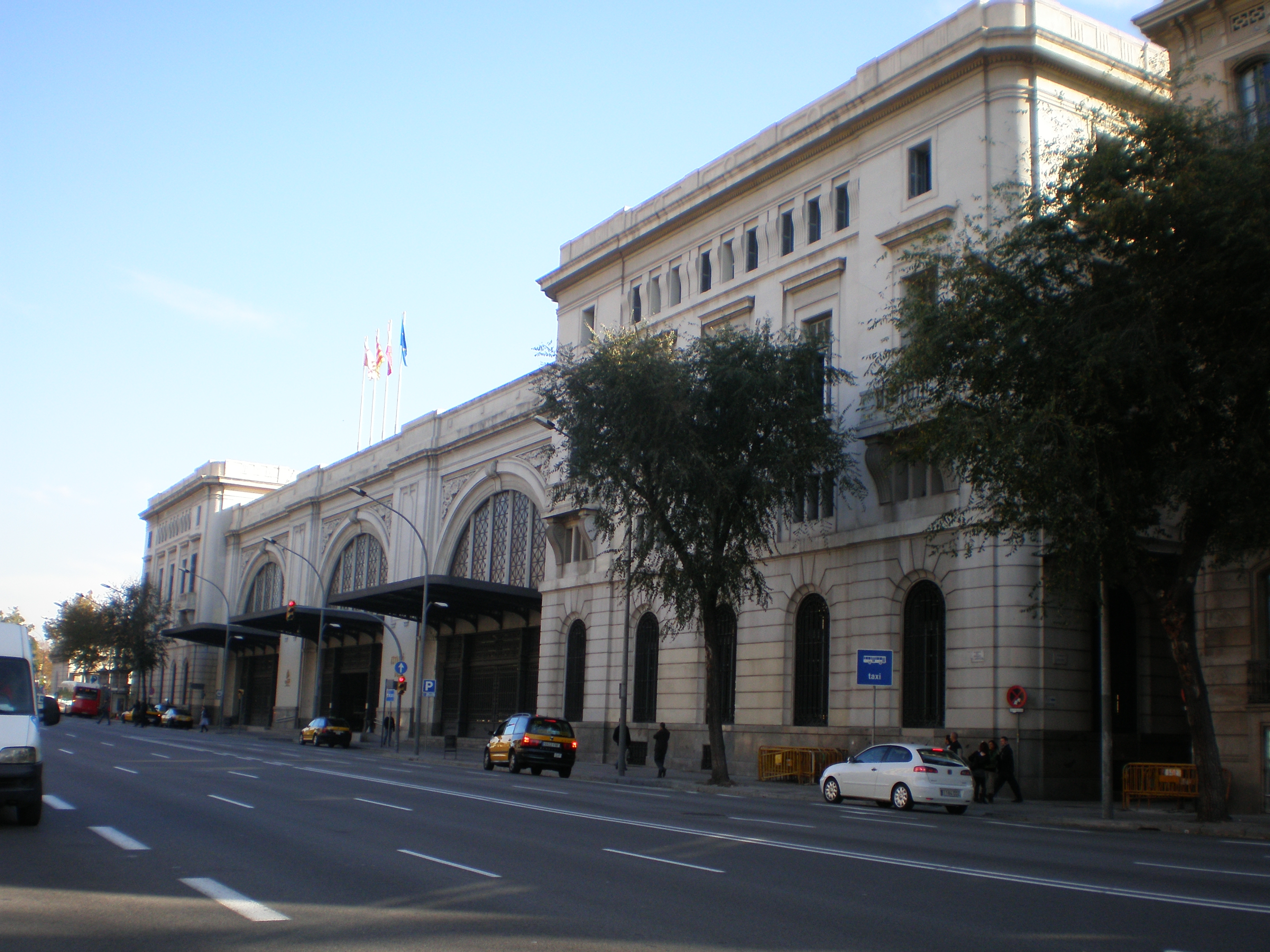
Façade

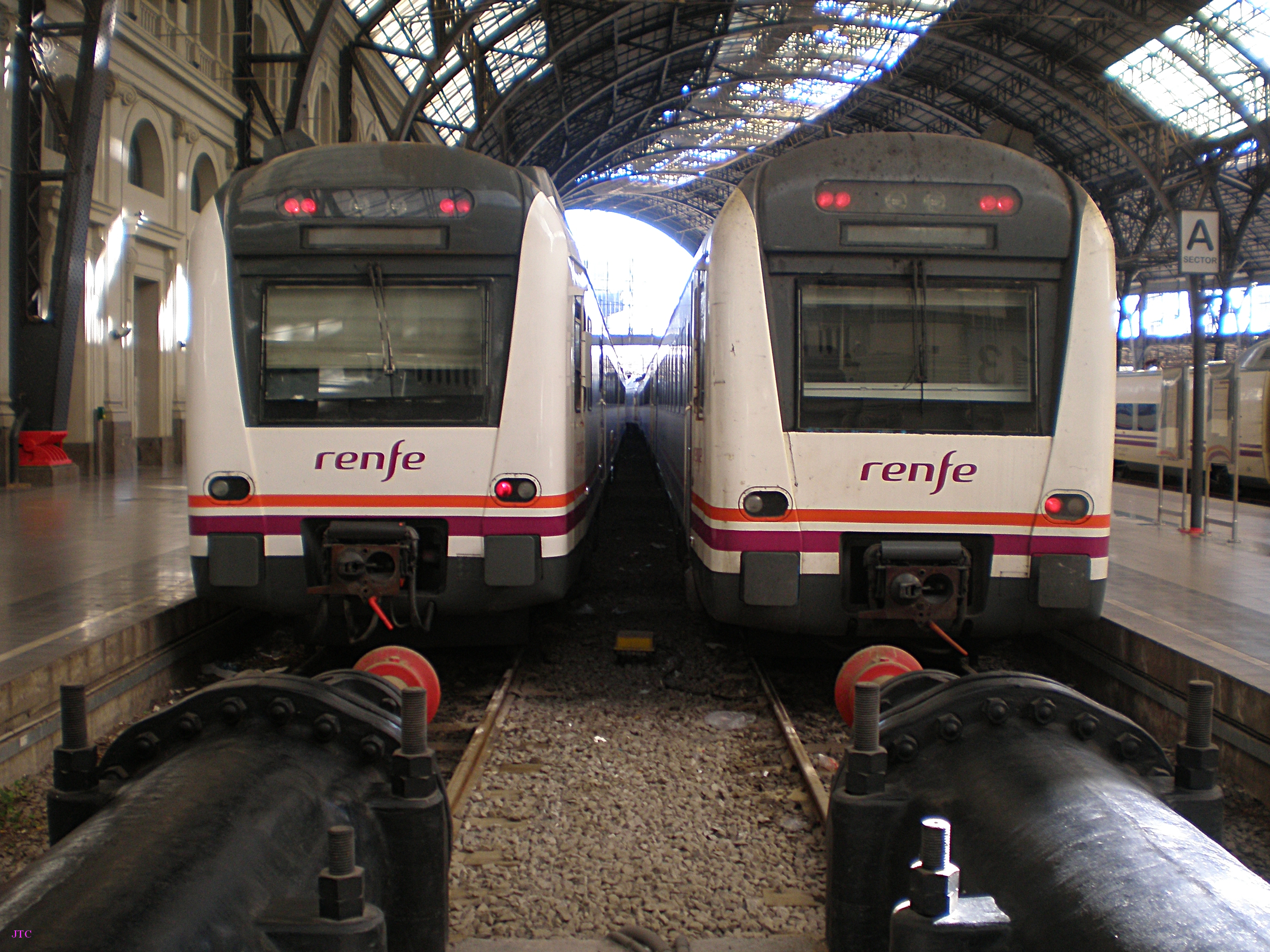

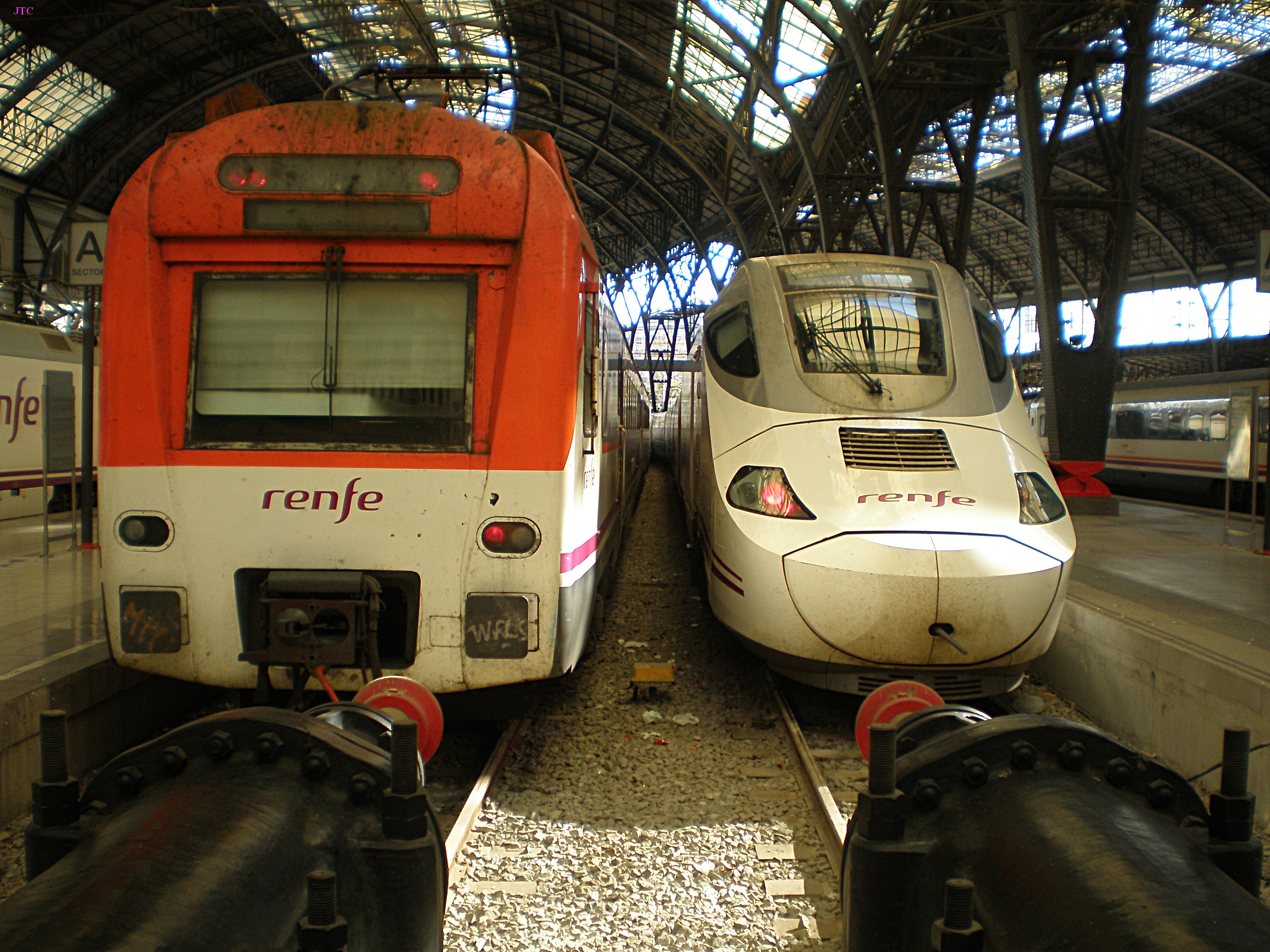

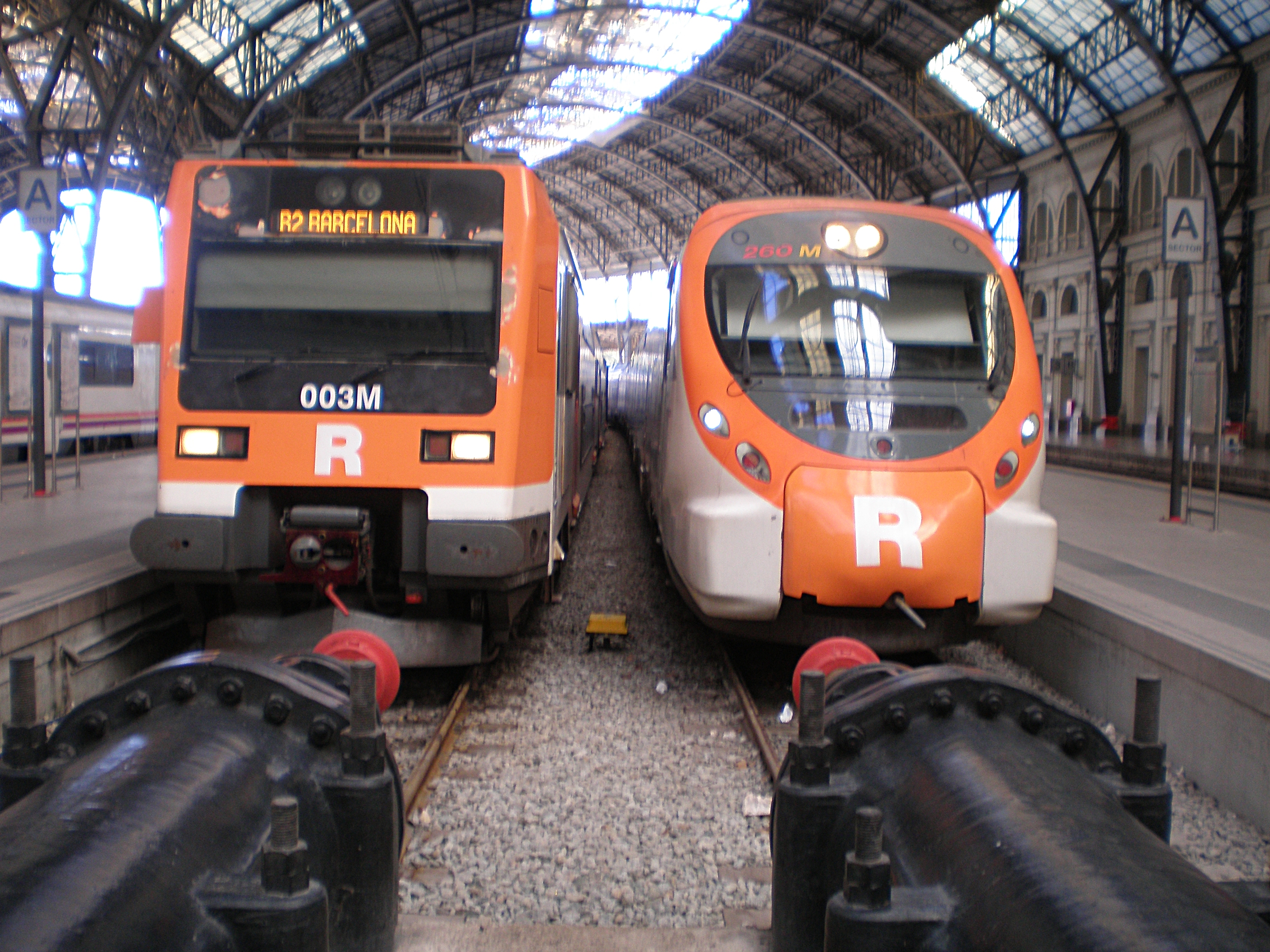

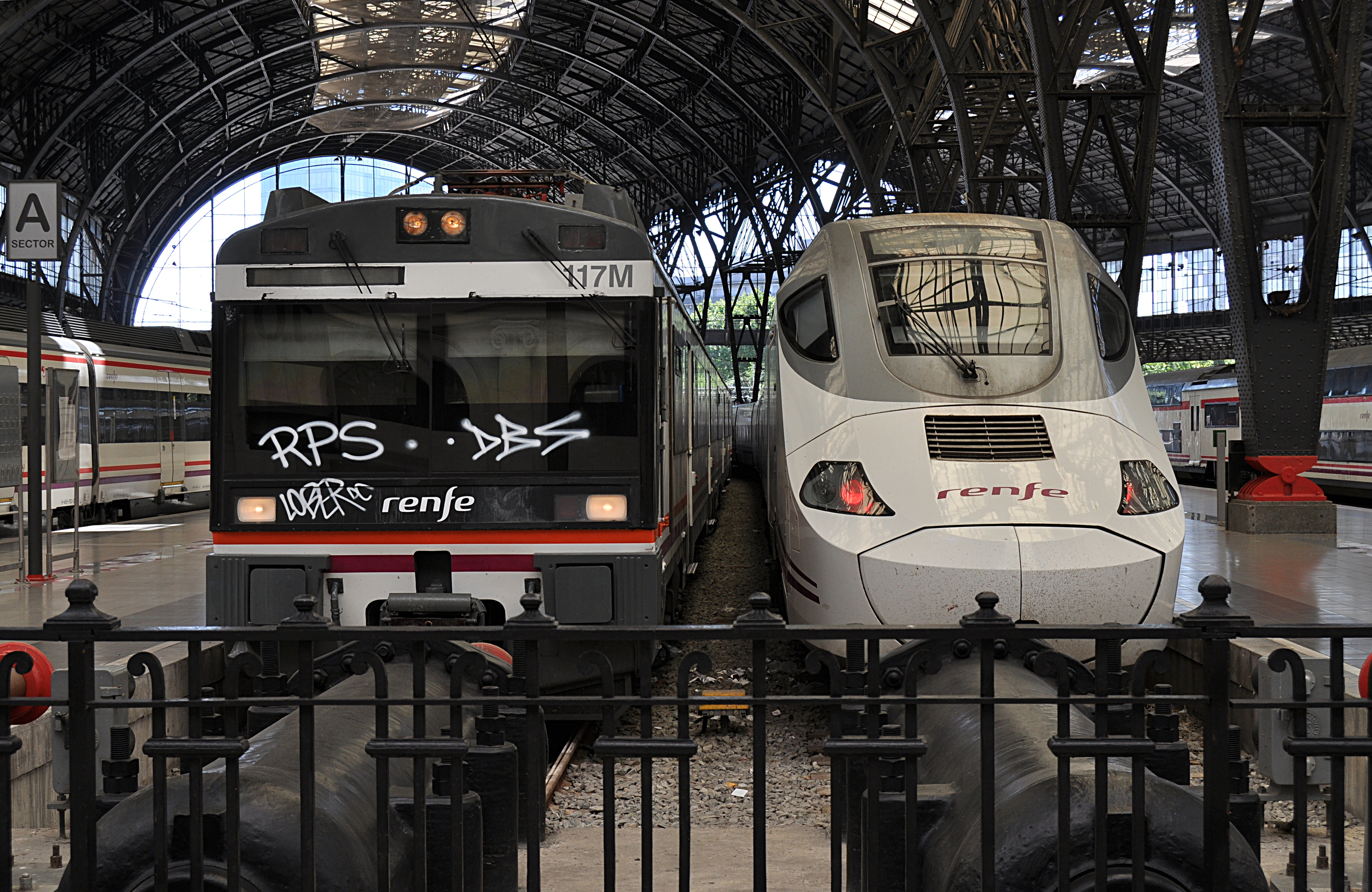

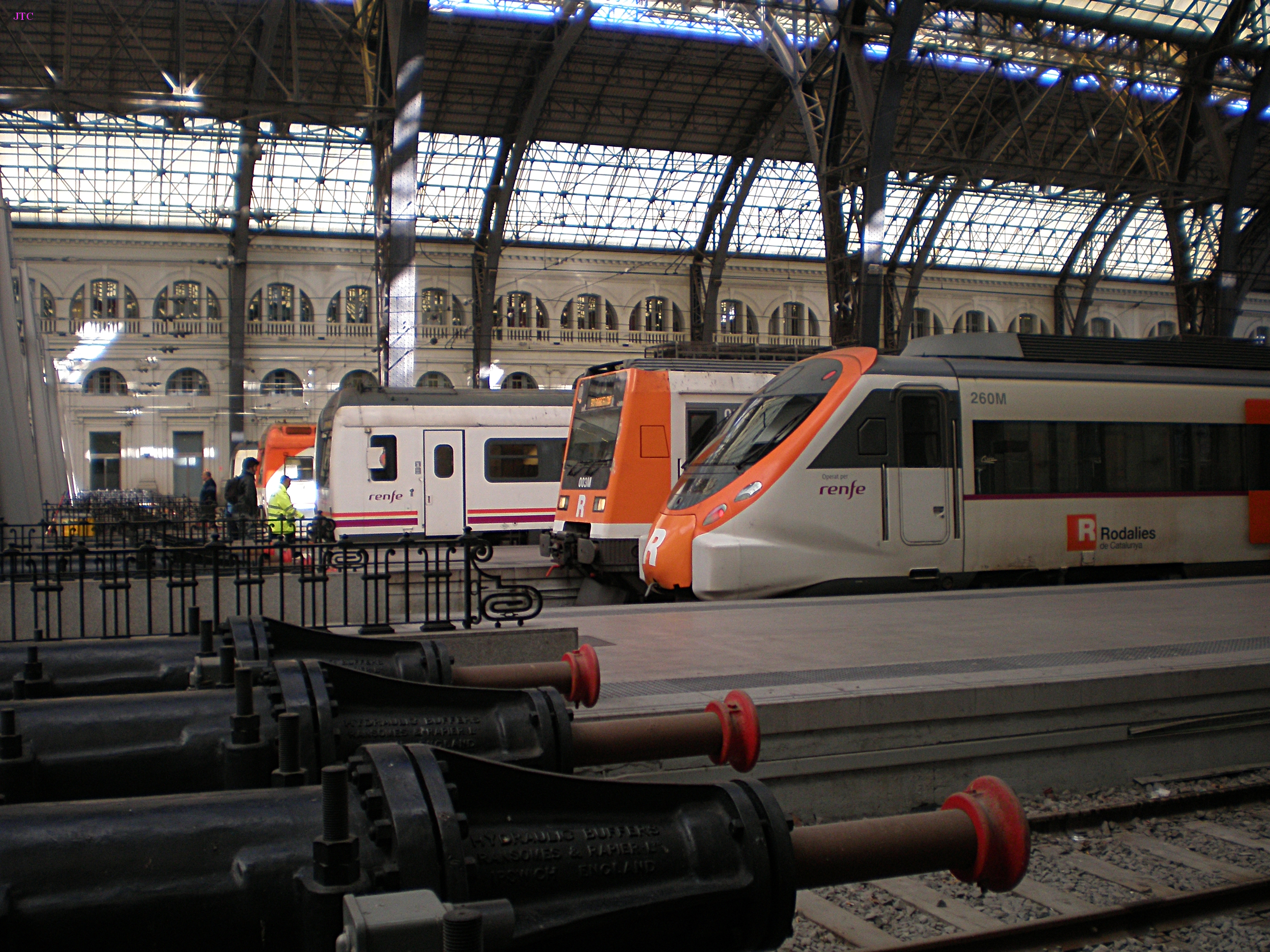

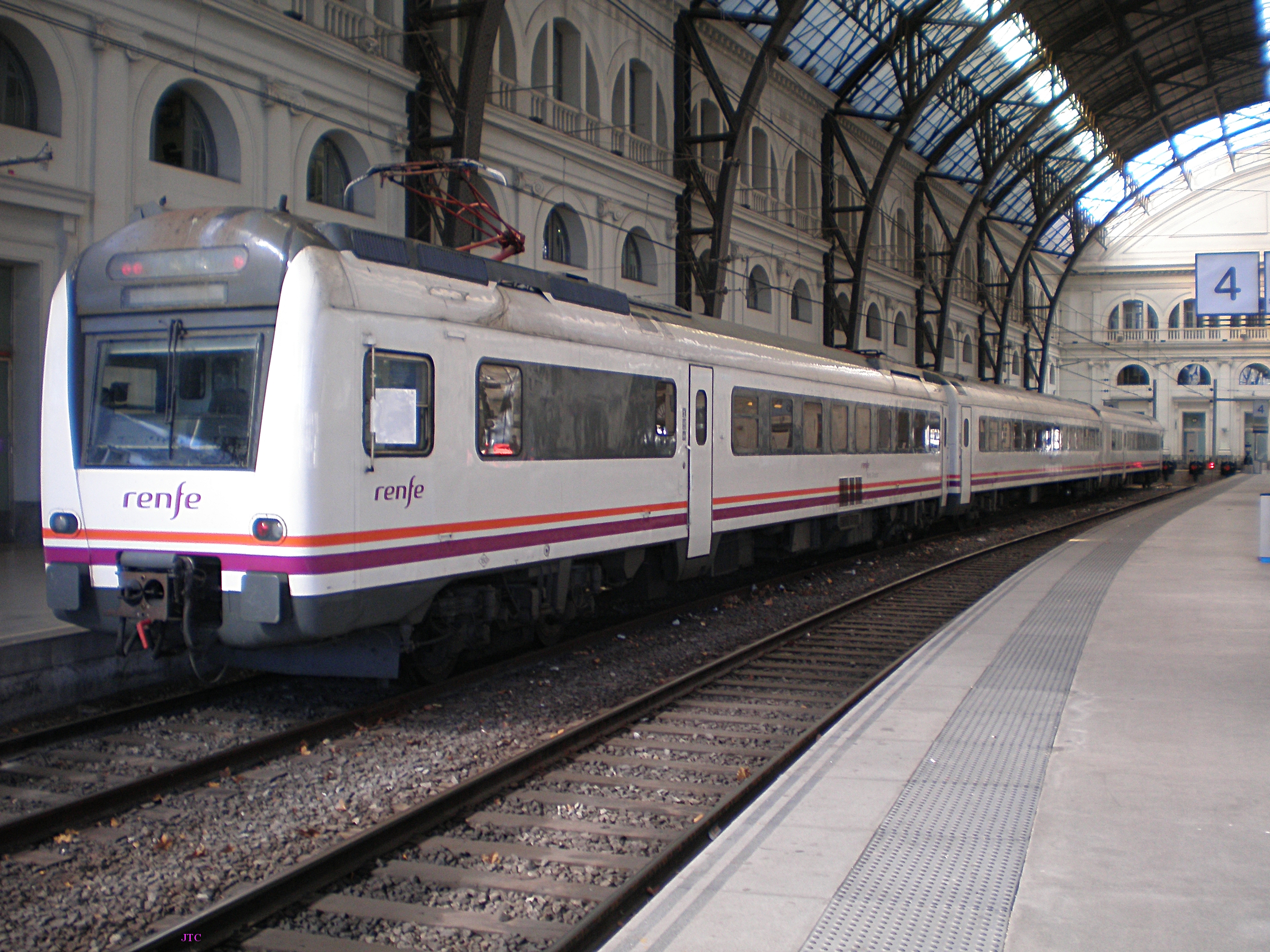

== Accidents and incidents ==
On 28 July 2017, a train hit the buffers at the station, injuring sixty people, eleven of them seriously.

== See also ==
- List of railway stations in Barcelona
- List of Rodalies Barcelona railway stations
- Estació de Sants
- Estació de la Sagrera
