= Garraf (disambiguation) =

Garraf may refer to:

- Garraf Massif, a mountain system in Barcelona province
- El Garraf, a comarca (county) in Barcelona province
- Parc Natural del Garraf, a natural park in the Garraf Massif
- Garraf (Sitges), a seaside village between Sitges and Castelldefels
- Port del Garraf, a marina in the coastal Garraf area
- Les Costes del Garraf, Carretera C-31 road
- Complot de Garraf an attempt to kill king Alfonso XIII of Spain in May 1925
