= Lorena Ermocida =

Argentine tango dancer

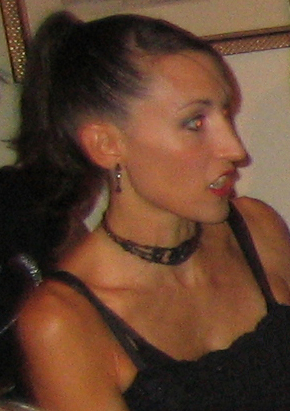
Lorena Ermocida 2006.

Lorena Ermocida is an Argentine tango dancer, teacher and choreographer.

== Biography ==
Lorena Ermocida is an internationally renowned Argentine Tango dancer, teacher and choreographer. In 1992, she graduated from the National Classic and Contemporary Dance School Maria Ruanova in Buenos Aires, Argentina, and has played key roles in various international musical theatre productions, such as Sólo Tango, Gotan (dancer and assistant choreographer), Tango x 2, including dancing in a special show of Tango Argentino. From 1999 to 2008, Lorena also toured the world and was the female solo tango dancer with Julio Iglesias' on his global concert tours. Lorena has been part of several tango shows such as La Casa de Osvaldo Piro, La Veda, Homero Manzi, La Esquina Carlos Gardel and Tango Porteño. In these last two shows, she danced with world-renowned Juan Carlos Copes. As for TV and film, Lorena Ermocida was a cast member of Grandes Valores del Tango, an Argentine television show. She also danced in Alan Parker's 1996 film Evita. Finally, Lorena was featured in the RAI documentary El Tango a Passo Di. As a famous "Show Tango" and "Tango Salón" dancer, Lorena is a member of the panel of judges for both the Buenos Aires Metropolitan Tango Championship and, in a number of countries, the Tango World Championship. Furthermore, she has danced in some of the most important theaters in the world, such as New York's Metropolitan Opera House, London's Royal Albert Hall, The Paris Opera, The Hollywood Bowl, The Sydney Opera House and, of course, Buenos Aires' Luna Park and Teatro Colón.

Since 1994, Lorena has taken part as a performer and dance teacher at the most important tango festivals worldwide. In Buenos Aires, she performed and taught seminars and classes at Lady's Tango Festival from 1997 to 2020, Tango Salón Extremo annually since 2012, CITA (1999-2001-2002-2004 and 2016), and in various years at Tango BA Festival and Mundial (Tango World Cup) and at Centro Cultural Kirchner CCK. Large and well-known festivals at which Lorena has had important roles include: Sydney Tango Salón Festival and Festival Pablito's (both in Sydney, Australia), Sunny Tango Festival in Crete (Greece), Tango Sun Festival Jurmala (Latvia), International Tango Torino Festival (Turin, Italy), Tanotango International Tango Festival (Naples, Italy), Istanbul Express (Turkey), Seoul Metropolitan Tango Championship and Festival (South Korea), Florianópolis Tango Festival and Florianópolis Tango Bienal (Florianópolis, Brazil), Internationales Hamburger Winter Tango Festival (Germany), and Tango Fantasy in Miami (USA). The list goes on, including major tango events throughout the world in major cities like San Francisco, Porto, Madrid, Valencia, Sitges, Rome, Bologna, Amsterdam, Freiburg, Moscow, Ankara, Beijing, Shenzhen, Shanghai, Taipei, Koushon, Tainan, and Manila. When she is not traveling abroad, Lorena also teaches in Buenos Aires at the popular weekly tango “practica” Cheek to Cheek.

Among her various dance partners, she danced with the late Osvaldo Zotto for 11 years. Together, they developed a unique personal style, studied by many dancers throughout the world. She also partnered with Fabián Peralta, and Lorena has been dancing with Pancho Martinez Pey since 2012. Lorena is also a dance teacher, and among her famous students is the celebrated actor Willem Dafoe.

Among other recognitions, Lorena Ermocida was awarded in Italy the Leonida Massine Prize for her artistic achievement, and, in Buenos Aires, she won the Pa Que Bailen Los Muchachos Prize, as her work was declared of “cultural interest” by the Argentine Secretary of State for Culture. In December 2019, Lorena received her most recent recognition, and most prestigious honor, when Argentina's National Academy of Tango inducted Lorena into its first class of the “Intermediate Generation” of Tango Artists in recognition of her “distinguished artistic trajectory”.
