= Alvania garrafensis =

Scientific classification
- Kingdom: Animalia
- Phylum: Mollusca
- Class: Gastropoda
- Subclass: Caenogastropoda
- Order: Littorinimorpha
- Family: Rissoidae
- Genus: Alvania
- Species: A. garrafensis

Binomial name
- Alvania garrafensis Peñas & Rolán, 2008

Species of gastropod

Alvania garrafensis is a species of minute sea snail, a marine gastropod mollusk or micromollusk in the family Rissoidae.

== Description ==
The length of the shell attains 2.8 mm, its diameter 1.65 mm.

== Distribution ==
This marine species occurs off Garraf, Spanish Mediterranean coastline.
