= Garraf railway station =

Railway station in Spain

Garraf
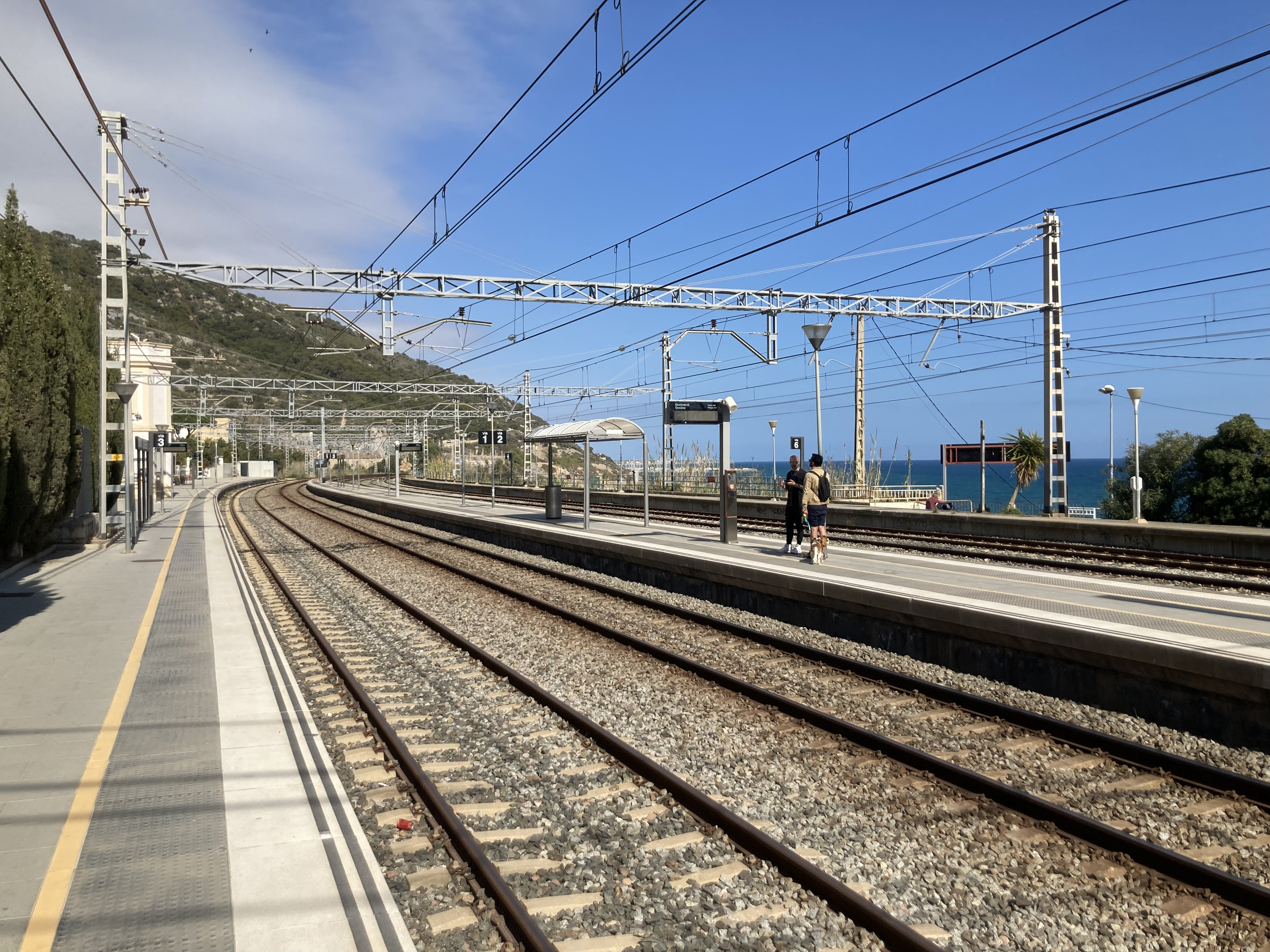

General information
- Location: Spain
- Coordinates: 41.2545°N 1.9026°E
- System: Rodalies de Catalunya commuter rail station
- Operator: Renfe Operadora
- Line: Madrid–Barcelona
- Tracks: 5

Services
Preceding station	Rodalies de Catalunya	Following station
Sitges towards Sant Vicenç de Calders	R2 Sud	Platja de Castelldefels towards Barcelona Estació de França
Location

Garraf is a Rodalies de Catalunya railway station serving the village of Garraf in Catalonia, Spain. It is extremely close to the beach in Garraf, accessible by an underground tunnel by the station building on platform 3.

== Tracks ==
The station has 6 tracks, of which 5 are used and 4 have platforms. Platforms 1 and 2 are on an island, which is accessible by an underground subway, platform 3 connects to the station building, and platform 6 is on the other side of the station, accessible by an underpass connecting to the beach and town centre. The most used platforms are 1 and 2, with 1 hosting Vilanova i la Geltrú and Sant Vicenç de Calders (southbound) trains and platform 2 hosting Barcelona Estació de França (northbound) trains.

== Trains ==
=== Trainsets ===
The rolling stock used on the R2 Sud Line consists of Renfe Class 450 and 451 and Renfe Class 463, 464 and 465 (known as 'Civia'). Garraf station has trains which stop every half hour in both directions.

=== Northbound services (Barcelona Estació de França) ===
Northbound trains usually arrive at platform 2. Some trains can arrive at platform 6, however this is an uncommon occurrence. The stations is stopped at by trains originating at Vilanova i la Geltrú, however the final trains of the day originating at Sant Vicenç stop here as well.

=== Southbound services (Vilanova i La Geltrú/Sant Vicenç de Calders) ===
Southbound trains usually arrive at platform 1, but a few trains can arrive at platform 3. The station is mostly stopped at by trains with destination Vilanova i La Geltrú, however the final trains of the day stop at all stations, including Garraf.
