= Daltmar =

Coordinates: 41°17′34″N 1°41′39″E

Daltmar is a population center that belongs to the municipality of Olèrdola, region of Alt Penedès of the province of Barcelona, Catalonia, Spain.

It is located a short distance from Vilafranca del Penedes, and is the third-largest city core by population, 626 in 2018
