= El Jardí dels Ocells =

Bird park in Catalunya, Spain

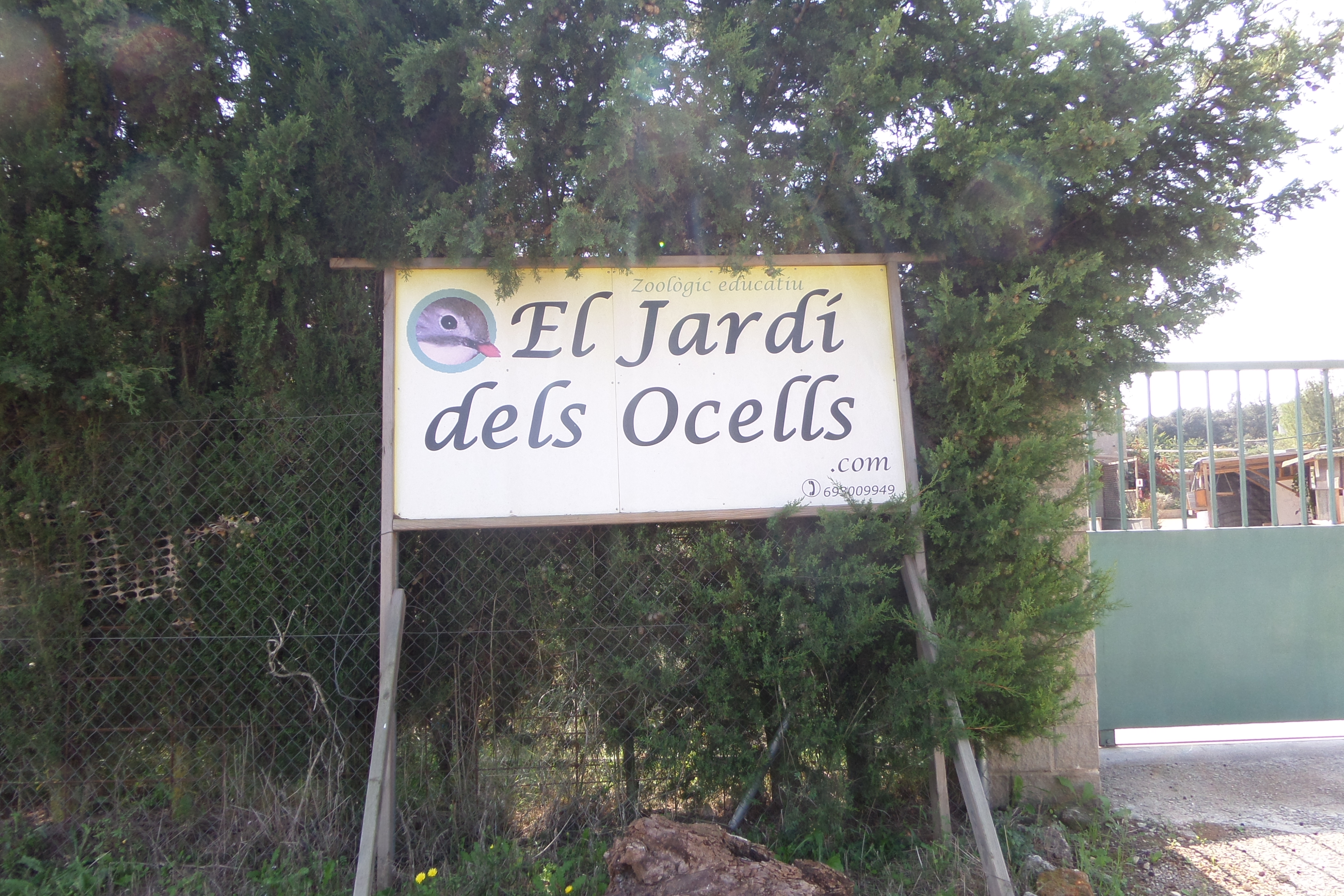
Name of park to be found by the entrance of the bird park.

El Jardí dels Ocells (Catalan for The Bird Garden, Spanish: El Jardín de los Pajaros) is a small bird park near the city of Olèrdola, in Catalunya, Spain. The bird park is at about 60 km. distance from Barcelona and Tarragona and is situated about halfway between these cities.

The Catalan word for birds, ocells, which is part of the name of the park, has more resemblance with the French word oiseaux than with the corresponding Spanish word pajaros.

El Jardí dels Ocells is a small British family business that aims at educating in and promoting a love of nature in general and birds in particular. Besides that, it is involved in breeding programmes for various bird species. The park is specialized in small birds, like small birds of song, of which several hundreds can be found in the park.

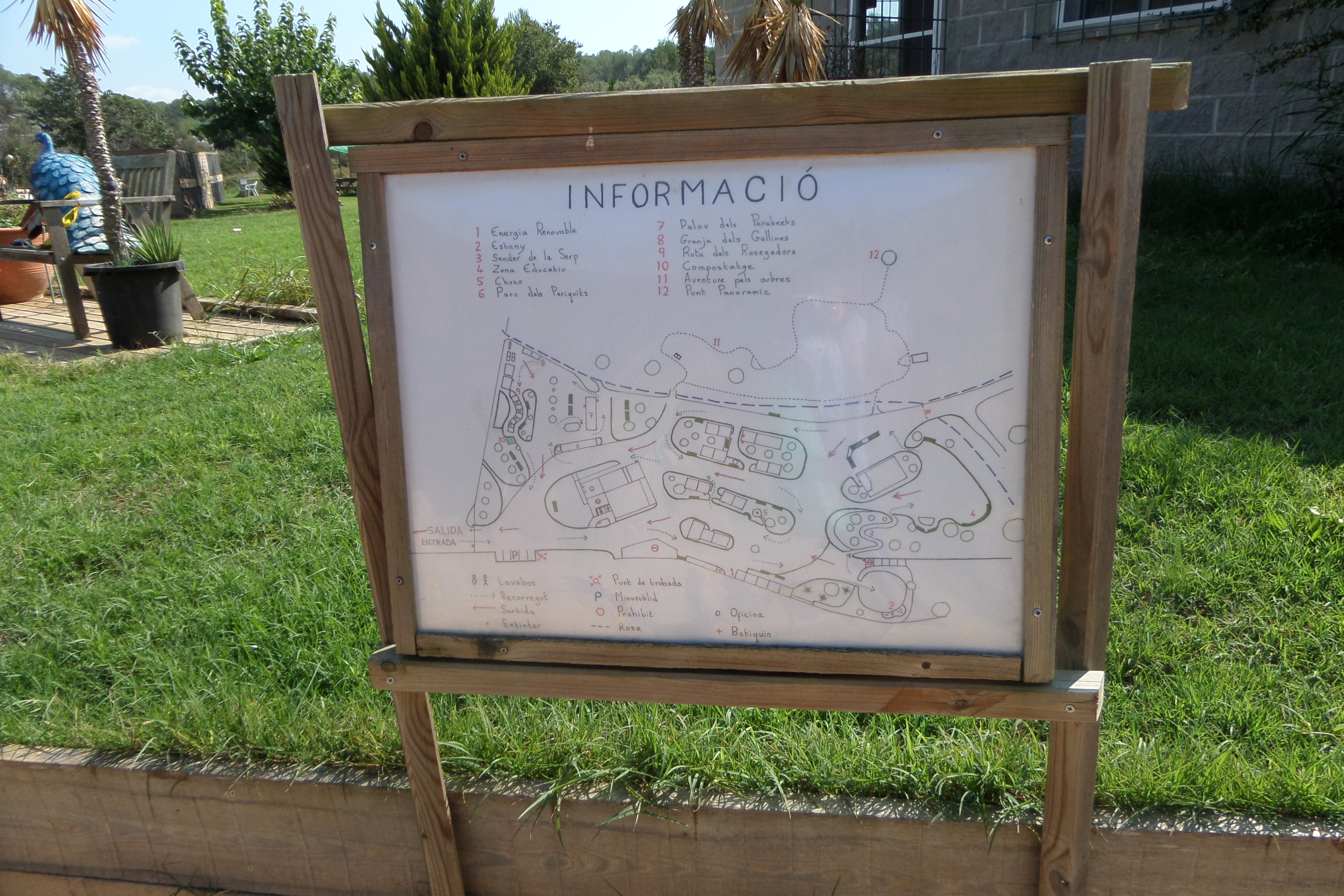
Map that can be found in the park.

The park is situated in the middle of the vineyards that surround Vilafranca de Penedès, and was started in 2012 on the terrain of a former vineyard. There is ample space between the bird cages, and there are benches near these cages, so that one can observe the birds while sitting. It may strike visitors that the cages look a bit messy inside, this is because one tries to come close to the natural habitats of the birds.
