= Penedesenca =

Spanish breed of chicken

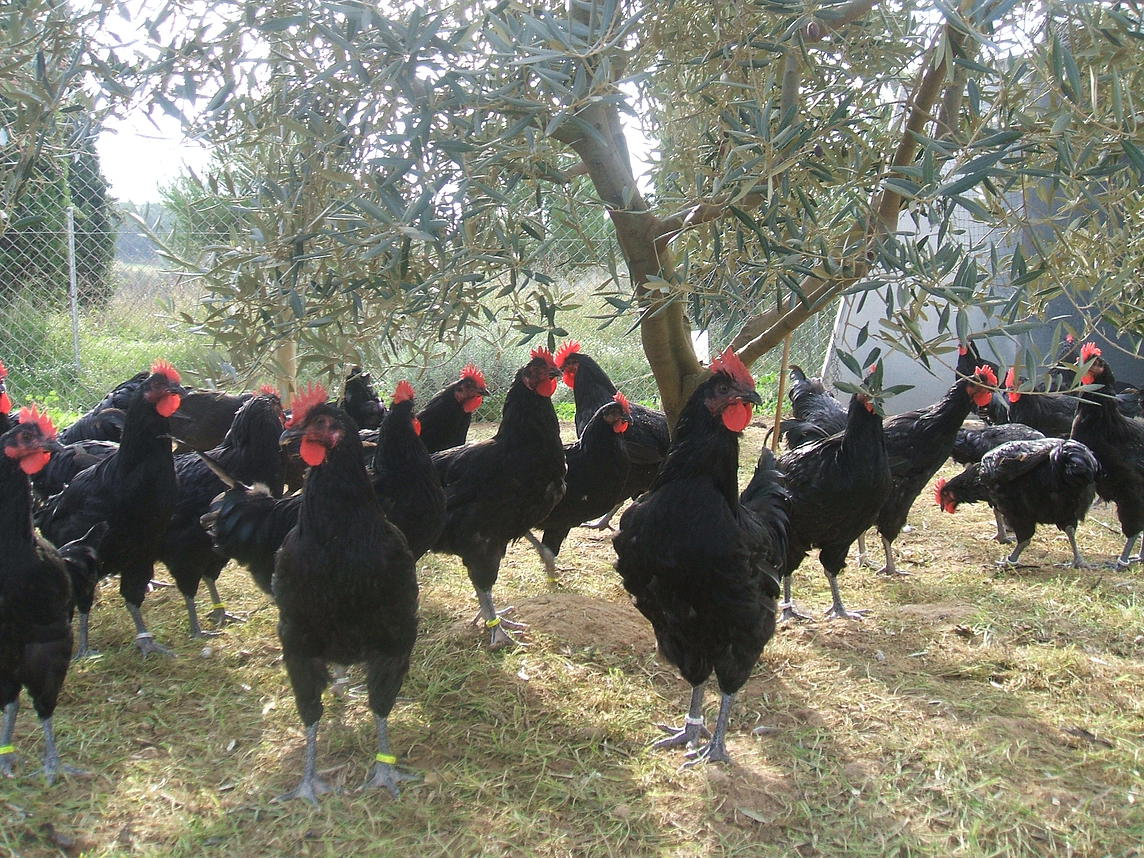
- Cocks and hens near Santa Margarida i els Monjos, in the comarca of Alt Penedès, in the province of Barcelona
- Conservation status: FAO (2007): critical/endangered; DAD-IS (2025): at risk/critical
- Other names: Gall del Penedès; Gall de Vilafranca del Penedès; Villafranquina Negra
- Country of origin: Spain
- Distribution: Catalonia
- Use: eggs

Traits
- Weight: Male: 2.3–3 kg; Female: 1.7–2.3 kg
- Egg colour: dark reddish-brown
- Comb type: single

Classification
- APA: no
- EE: yes
- PCGB: rare soft feather: heavy
- Chicken; Gallus gallus domesticus

The Penedesenca or Gall del Penedès is a Spanish breed of chicken originating in the autonomous community of Catalonia, in the area around Vilafranca del Penedès, the principal town of the historical Penedès region.

== History ==
It is not known for how long country people in Catalonia have raised chickens that laid dark brown eggs. The first documentation of them is from 1928, when attempts were made to avert the extinction of the type. In 1932 selection of a black type was begun by a group of breeders in a town near Vilafranca del Penedès. A breed standard for this black Penedesenca was approved in 1946, with the name "Villafranquina Negra", or black Vilafranca chicken.

== Use ==
Hens lay about 160 dark brown eggs per year, with an average weight of approximately 60 g. They are among the darkest-coloured eggs laid by hens of any breed.

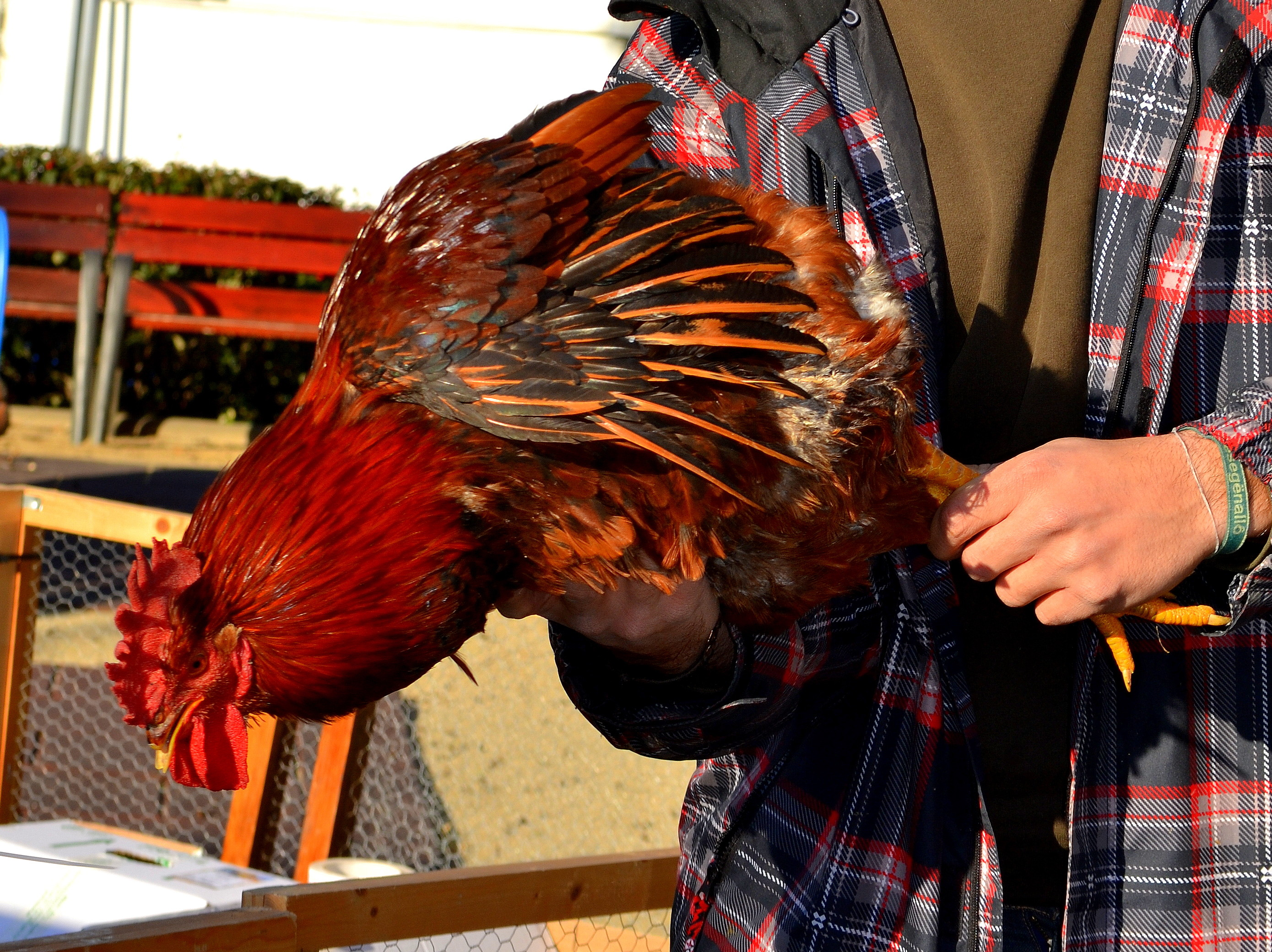
Cock at the Fira del Gall of Vilafranca del Penedès

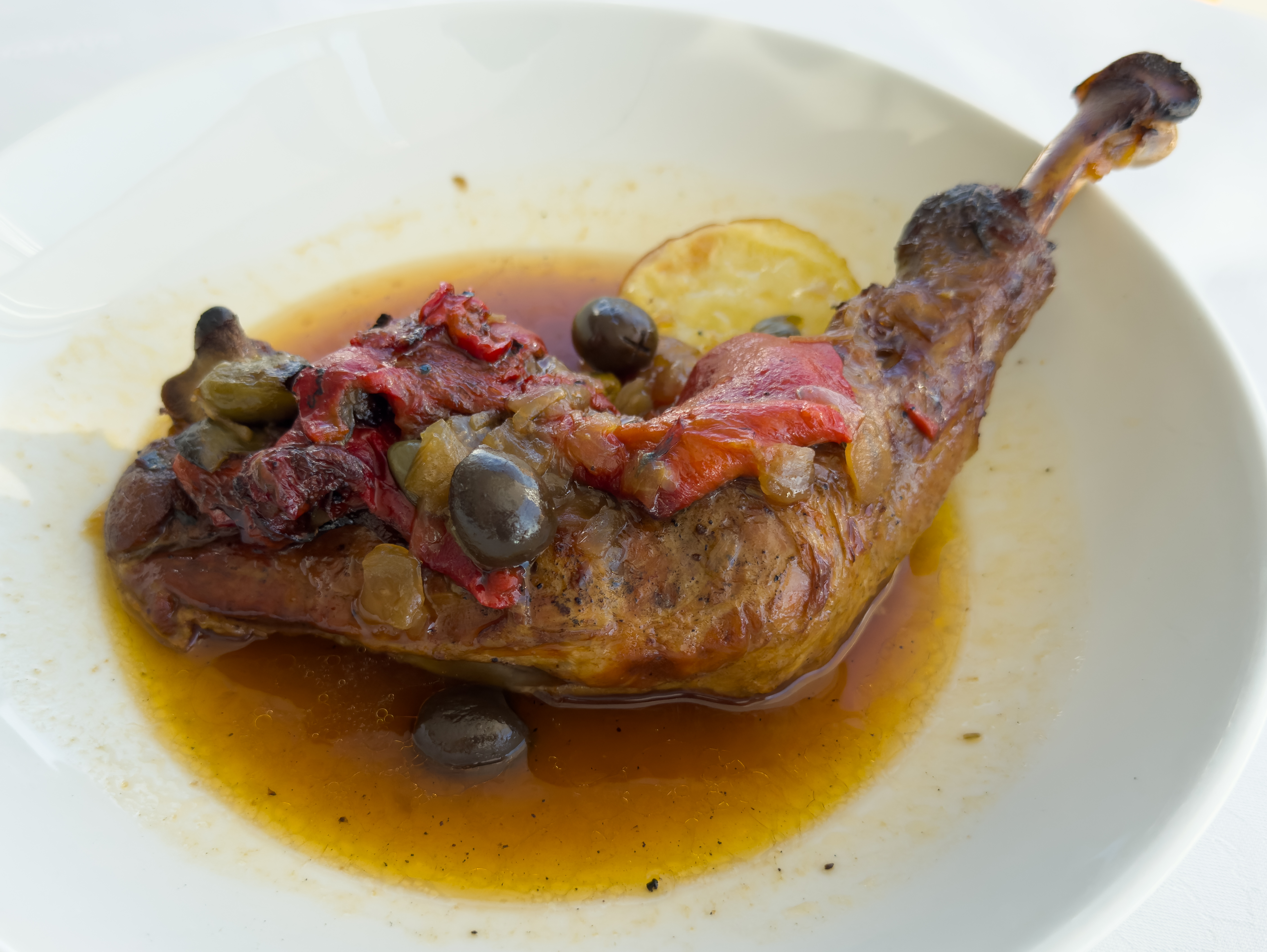
A cooked leg
