= Joan Sella i Montserrat =

Catalan journalist, writer and food critic

Joan Sella
- Born: Joan Sella i Montserrat; 1960 (age 65–66); Sitges, Catalonia
- Writing career
- Language: Catalan, Spanish
- Genre: Novel

Joan Sella i Montserrat (Sitges, 1960) is a Catalan journalist, writer and gastronomy critic. He worked at Televisión Española. In 2002, he published Breviari del xató with El Pati Blau, a publishing house from Sitges. Comer como un rey, published in 2009, shows the menus and banquets of Amadeus I, Count of Savoy and Alfonso XII of Spain. In 2010, he published El misteri de "La nena de la clavellina" (Edicions Saldonar), where, named as a Santiago Rusiñol painting, he seeks to recover his memories of childhood and adolescence in Sitges, his hometown.

== Published work ==
- Breviari del xató, El Pati Blau, 2002
- Comer como un rey, Trea, 2009, ISBN 978-84-9704-444-8
- El misteri de "La nena de la clavellina", Saldonar, 2010, ISBN 978-84-937800-1-2
