= Sitges railway station =

Railway station in Sitges, Catalonia, Spain

Sitges
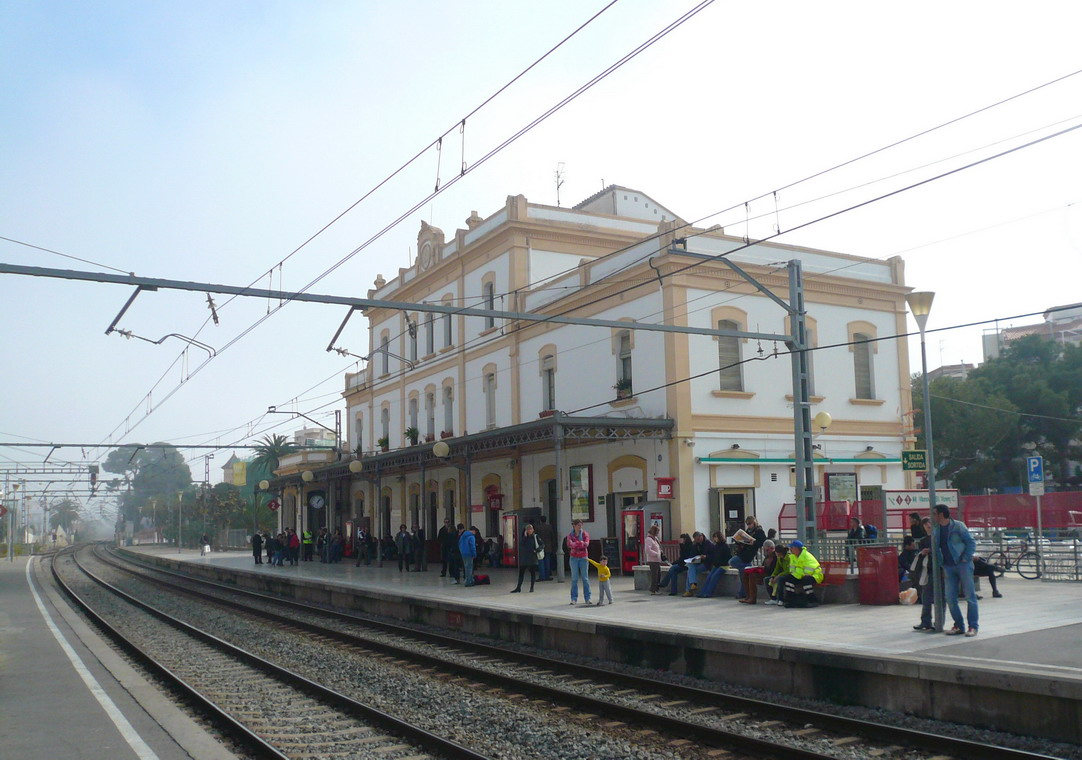
- The station in 2008

General information
- Location: Plaça d'Eduard Maristany; 08870 Sitges; Spain
- Coordinates: 41°14′20.67″N 1°48′34.82″E
- System: Rodalies de Catalunya commuter and regional rail station
- Owner: Adif
- Operator: Renfe Operadora
- Line: Madrid–Barcelona (PK 643.3)
- Platforms: 2 island platforms
- Tracks: 5 (4 with platform)
- Connections: Local buses

Construction
- Structure type: At-grade
- Accessible: yes

Other information
- Station code: 71701
- Fare zone: 3A (ATM Àrea de Barcelona); 4 (Rodalies de Catalunya's Barcelona commuter rail service)

History
- Opened: 1881

Services
Preceding station	Rodalies de Catalunya	Following station
Vilanova i la Geltrú towards Sant Vicenç de Calders	R2 Sud	Garraf Some trains only towards Barcelona Estació de França
Vilanova i la Geltrú Some trains only towards Lleida Pirineus	R13	Castelldefels Some Regional (R) trains only towards Barcelona Estació de França
Vilanova i la Geltrú Some trains only towards Lleida Pirineus	R14	Castelldefels Some Regional (R) trains only towards Barcelona Estació de França
Vilanova i la Geltrú Some trains only towards Riba-roja d'Ebre	R15	Castelldefels Some Regional (R) trains only towards Barcelona Estació de França
Location

Sitges is a Rodalies de Catalunya railway station serving Sitges, in Catalonia, Spain. It is served by Barcelona commuter rail service line R2 Sud as well as some trains on regional lines R13, R14 and R15.

The station has three platforms: platform 2 is the location of the main ticket office and waiting room as well as the entrance and exit to the station. Platforms 1 and 3 form an island platform which are accessed by an underground subway from platform 2, or from an underground entrance from the other side.

Unfortunately, disabled access to platforms 1 and 3 is very problematical, as the elevators are frequently out of service. This in turn creates a problem for those arriving from the Barcelona direction as the only way to descend from the platform is by stairs or the troublesome elevators. When the elevators are out of action, as is frequently the case, a wheelchair user has to travel to the next station, Vilanova i la Geltrú, then return to Sitges to be able to exit the station via platform 2.

Coming from Barcelona the preceding station is Garraf and the following station is Vilanova i la Geltrú.
