= Sitges =

- Municipality
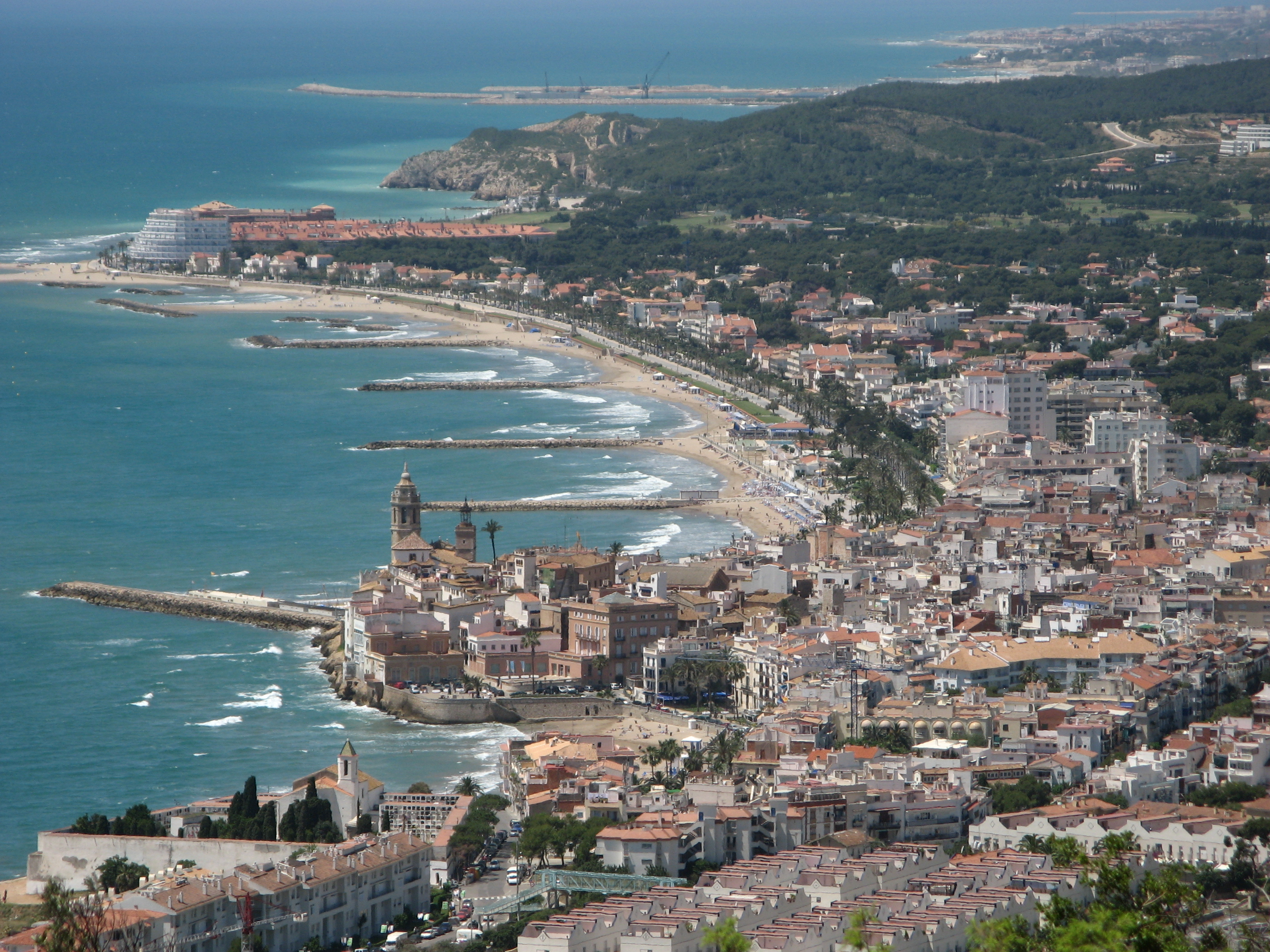
- Sitges

- Flag Coat of arms
- Nickname: Blanca Subur
- Location of Sitges
- Location within Catalonia Location within Spain
- Coordinates: 41.237°N 1.823°E
- Country: Spain
- Autonomous community: Catalonia
- Province: Barcelona
- Comarca: Garraf
- Judicial district: Vilanova i la Geltrú

Government
  - Mayor: Aurora Carbonell i Abella (2019) (Republican Left of Catalonia)

Area
  - Total: 43.85 km^{2} (16.93 sq mi)
- Elevation: 10 m (33 ft)
- Highest elevation: 591 m (1,939 ft)

Population (2025-01-01)
  - Total: 32,609
  - Density: 743.6/km^{2} (1,926/sq mi)
- Demonym(s): sitgetà (m), sitgetana (f)
- Time zone: UTC+1 (CET)
  - Summer (DST): UTC+2 (CEST)
- Postal code: 08870
- Dialing code: 93
- Official languages: Catalan; Spanish
- Website: www.sitges.cat

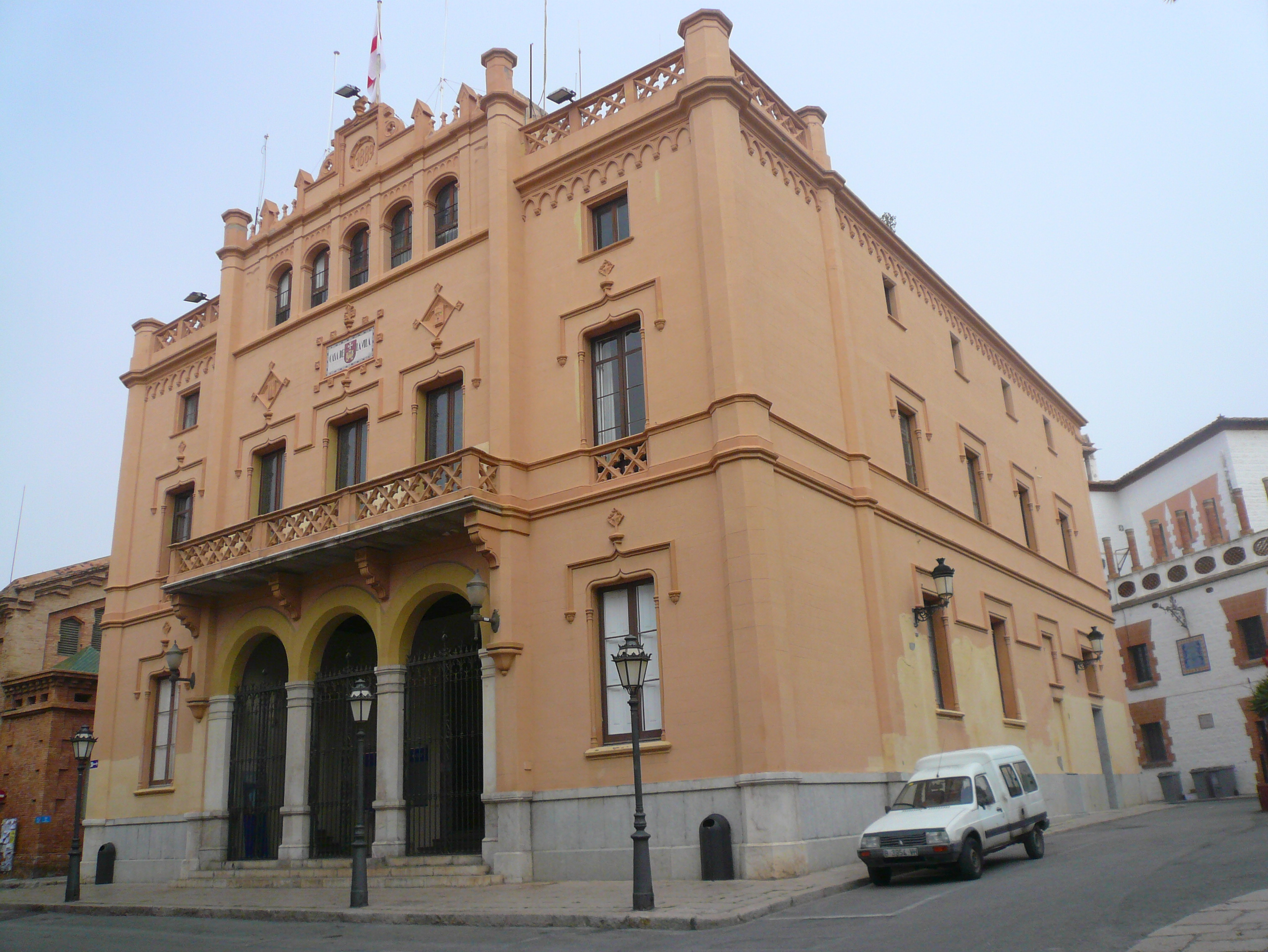
Sitges City Hall (1889)

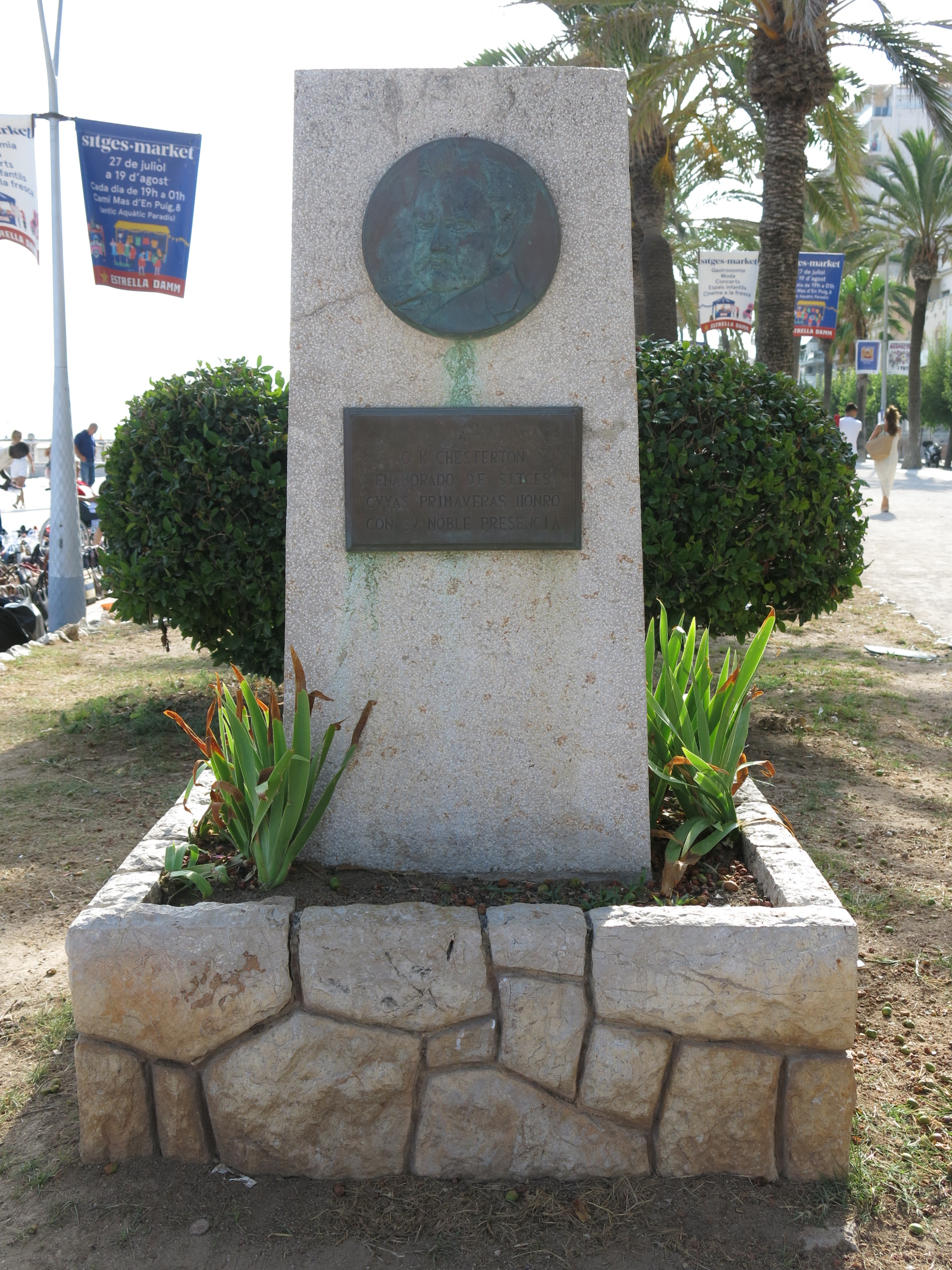
Monument to G. K. Chesterton (1976), by Manuel Muns.

Sitges (Catalan: [ˈsidʒəs], Spanish: [ˈsitʃes]; Old Catalan for 'underground [grain] silos') is a town about 35 kilometres southwest of Barcelona, in Catalonia, Spain, renowned worldwide for its film festival, Carnival, and Catalan culture. Located between the Garraf Massif and the Mediterranean Sea, it is known for its beaches, nightspots, LGBTQ+ tourism, and historical sites.

While the roots of Sitges' artistic reputation date back to the late 19th century, when painter Santiago Rusiñol took up residence there during the summer, the town became a centre for the 1960s counterculture in mainland Spain during the Francoist regime, and became known as "Ibiza in miniature".

Today, the economy of Sitges is based on tourism and culture, offering more than 4,500 hotel beds, half of them in four-star hotels.

Almost 35% of the approximately 26,000 permanent inhabitants are estimated to be foreigners, a majority from Northern Europe.

There are 17 beaches in Sitges, the most popular being Platja de Sant Sebastià, Platja de la Fragata, Platja de la Bassa Rodona, Platja dels Balmins, Platja de la Ribera and Platja d'Aiguadolç.

Sitges has been referred to as the Saint-Tropez of Spain, with property prices approaching those of the most expensive European cities, the main reason for this being the setting by the sea and the surrounding Garraf Park. Proximity to Barcelona-El Prat Airport is also a major advantage.

== Toponymy ==
It is said that the romans called it "Blanca subur", the "white town" The name of the town is simply the Catalan word sitges, plural of sitja, meaning 'silos', cisterns or granaries in English.

Historically, Sitges boasted many silos for storing grain and it is assumed that the original town center was built around the castle (the area of today's town hall) precisely where these storage structures were situated.

== History ==
Human presence in Sitges dates back to at least 50,000 years, proved by researchers from Barcelona university in "the journal of human evolution" when neanderthal bones and stone tools were discovered in ‘La Cova del Gegant’, a cave near today's golf course, were carbon-dated.

During the Middle Ages, a castle was built in Sitges, owned by the bishopric of Barcelona, which later ceded it to count Mir Geribert (1041). In the 12th century, the town fell under the rule of the Sitges family. The latter held it until 1308, when Agnes of Sitges sold the town to Bernat de Fonollar, after whose death it went to the Pia Almoina, a charitable institution, to which it belonged until 1814.

Between the late-18th century and the early-20th, the history of Sitges was dominated by its close links with Spain's overseas territories, most importantly Cuba. Thousands of youngsters from Sitges settled in Santiago de Cuba, Guantánamo and other areas in Eastern Cuba. Most of them were employed in commerce, usually working for relatives already established in the island. Some of them thrived and created big firms, like Facundo Bacardí, founder of Ron Bacardí, and Jaime Brugal, who later moved to the Dominican Republic and established Ron Brugal. Some others, after having amassed a certain fortune, settled back in Sitges, generally living on rent or investing in sectores like wine or shoe making. These were known as "Americanos", known for their habit of planting palm trees in their Caribbean-looking houses, smoking Cuban cigars and rum drinking. The americanos left a huge legacy in Sitges which can still be seen in its architecture and the history of most local families.

This legacy is also visible because it has created the name of every beach bar in Spain "Chiringuito". The first beach bar in Spain opened in Sitges in 1913, called El Kiosket and renamed in 1949 "chiringuito" by the Spanish journalist César González Ruano, inspired by his experiences travelling Cuba where coffee was strained through a stocking called "chiringo".

After Spain lost its overseas territories as a result of the Spanish-American War in 1898, the migration flow from Sitges to Cuba continued, but most of the trade ended. As most of Catalan economy, Sitges found its biggest market in the rest of Spain. Shoe making shaped Sitges' economy during the first third of the 20th century. Sitges economy was mostly based on the production of wine until the late 19th century, when the first mechanized shoe factory in Spanish history was established in the town in 1874, starting a powerful shoe making sector which employed ca. 80% of local workers by the mid-20th century. The tourist boom of the 1960s ended the era of shoe making and made local economy essentially depending on tourism and services.

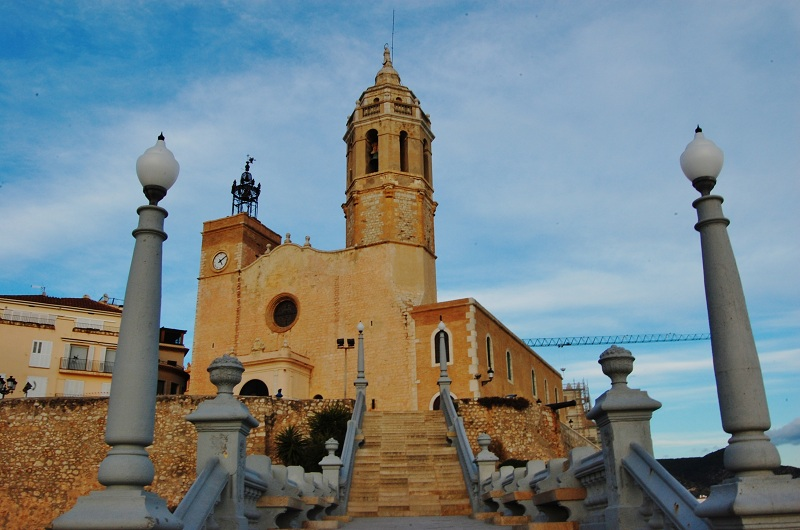
The iconic church of St. Bartholomew and St. Thecla (17th century).

Due to the wave of artists settling in the town in the wake of Santiago Rusiñol, who established his studio (nowadays Museu del Cau Ferrat) wealthy families from Barcelona built summer residences in Sitges, especially in the garden city known as Terramar. Sitges acquired an international reputation and attracted celebrities. American businessman, art collector, and philanthropist Charles Deering held an important art collection in Sitges between 1910 and 1921, where he built the impressive Palau Maricel (Maricel Palace). Intellectuals like G. K. Chesterton, who visited the town in 1926 and 1935, or the German boxer Max Schmelling, who trained for his match against Paulino Uzcudun in Terramar Hotel in 1934.

For most of the Civil War (1936–1939), Sitges was controlled by Republican forces. The town was captured following the Fall of Barcelona.

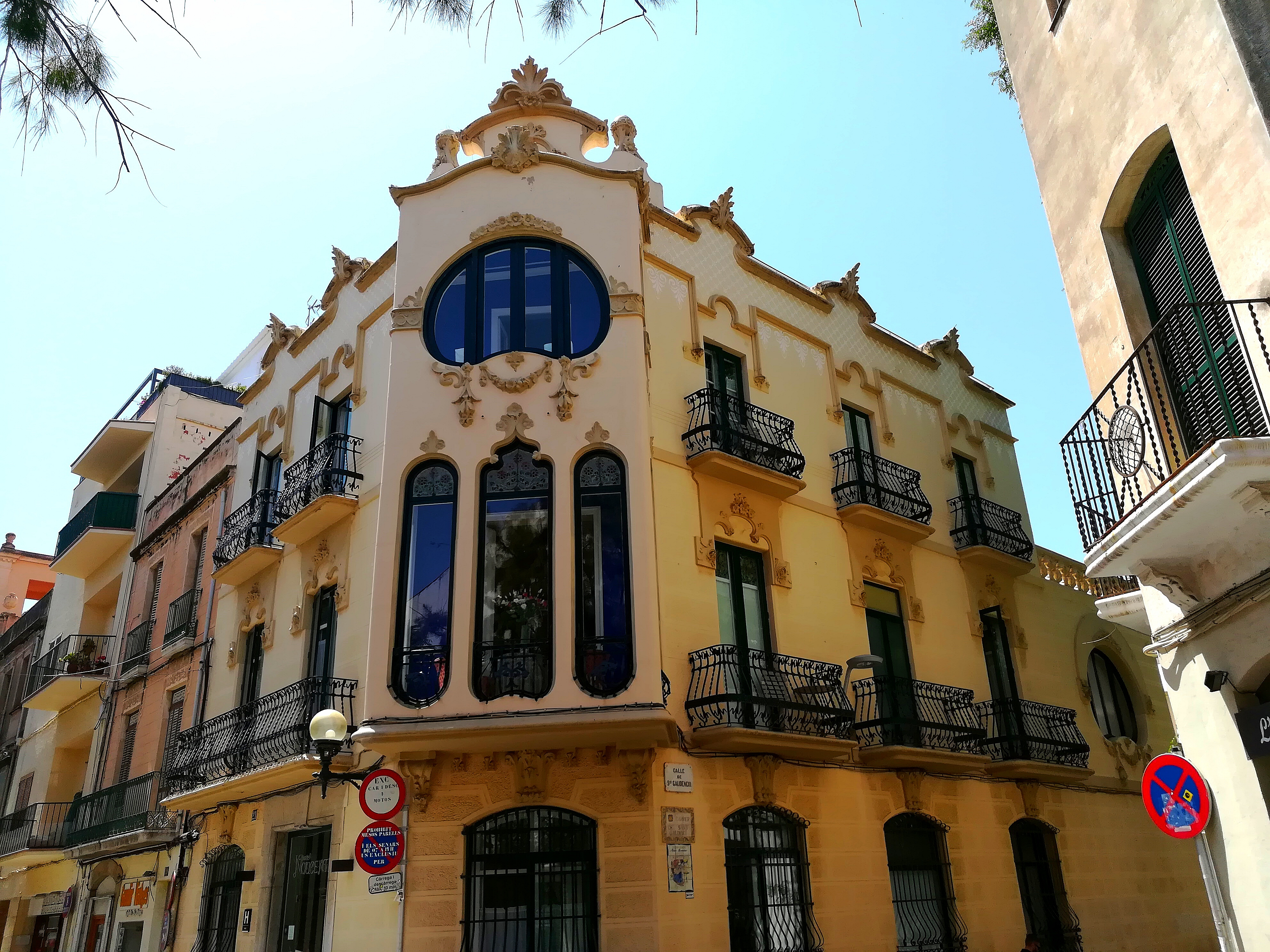
Casa Manuel Planas (1908), one of the finest examples of americano architecture in Sitges.

The British war journalist Henry Buckley (author of The Life and Death of the Spanish Republic, 1940) lived for a few months in Sitges during the conflict, marrying a local woman. He would eventually retire in the mid-1960s in the town, where he purchased a house and died in 197..

In 1958, political leaders (Liberals and Conservatives) from the country of Colombia met in Sitges and signed a peace treaty, the "Declaration of Sitges", instituting a consociationalist democracy in Colombia and creating the National Front.

== Geography ==
The municipality of Sitges is located in the Garraf comarca. It is bordered to the north by the municipalities of Olivella and Begues, to the west by Sant Pere de Ribes and Vilanova i la Geltrú, to the east by Gavà and Castelldefels, and to the south by the Mediterranean Sea.

Boundaries of the municipality of Sitges within the province of Barcelona.

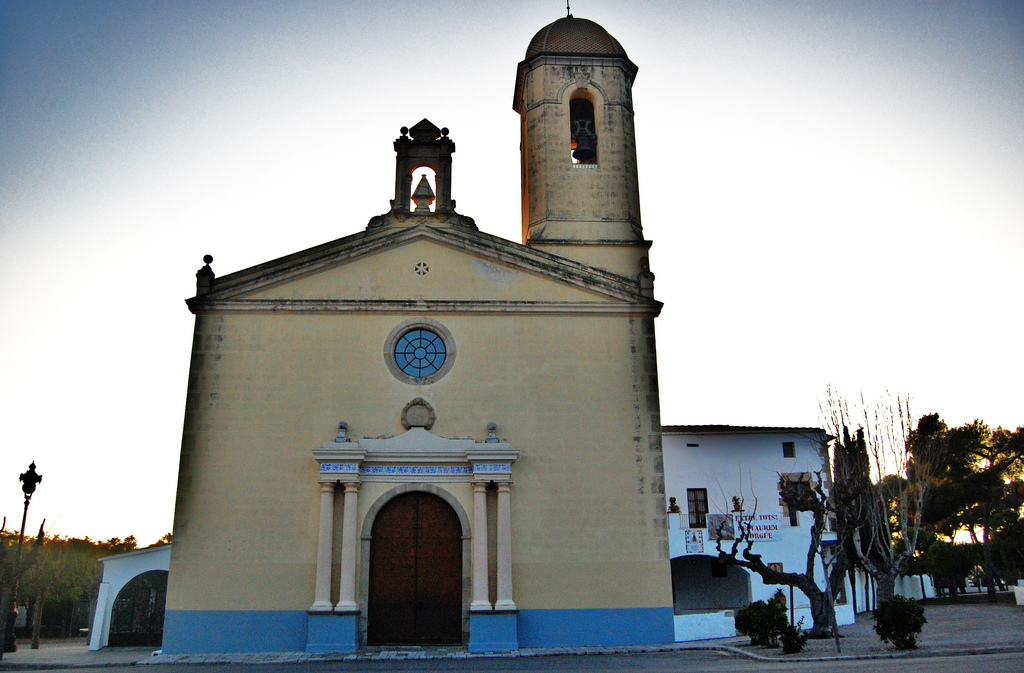
Sanctuary of Our Lady of Vinyet (18th century), patroness of Sitges.

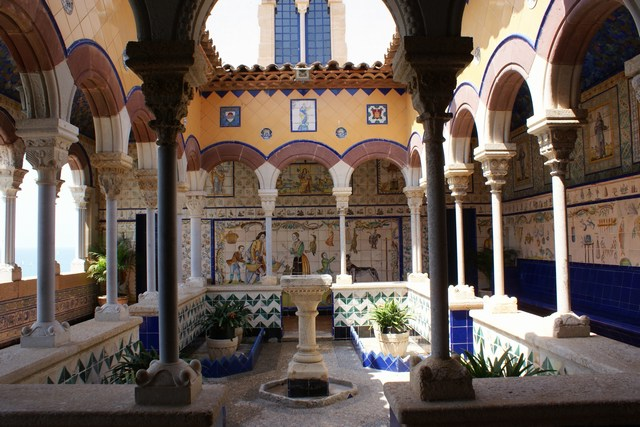
Interior view of Charles Deering's Palau Maricel

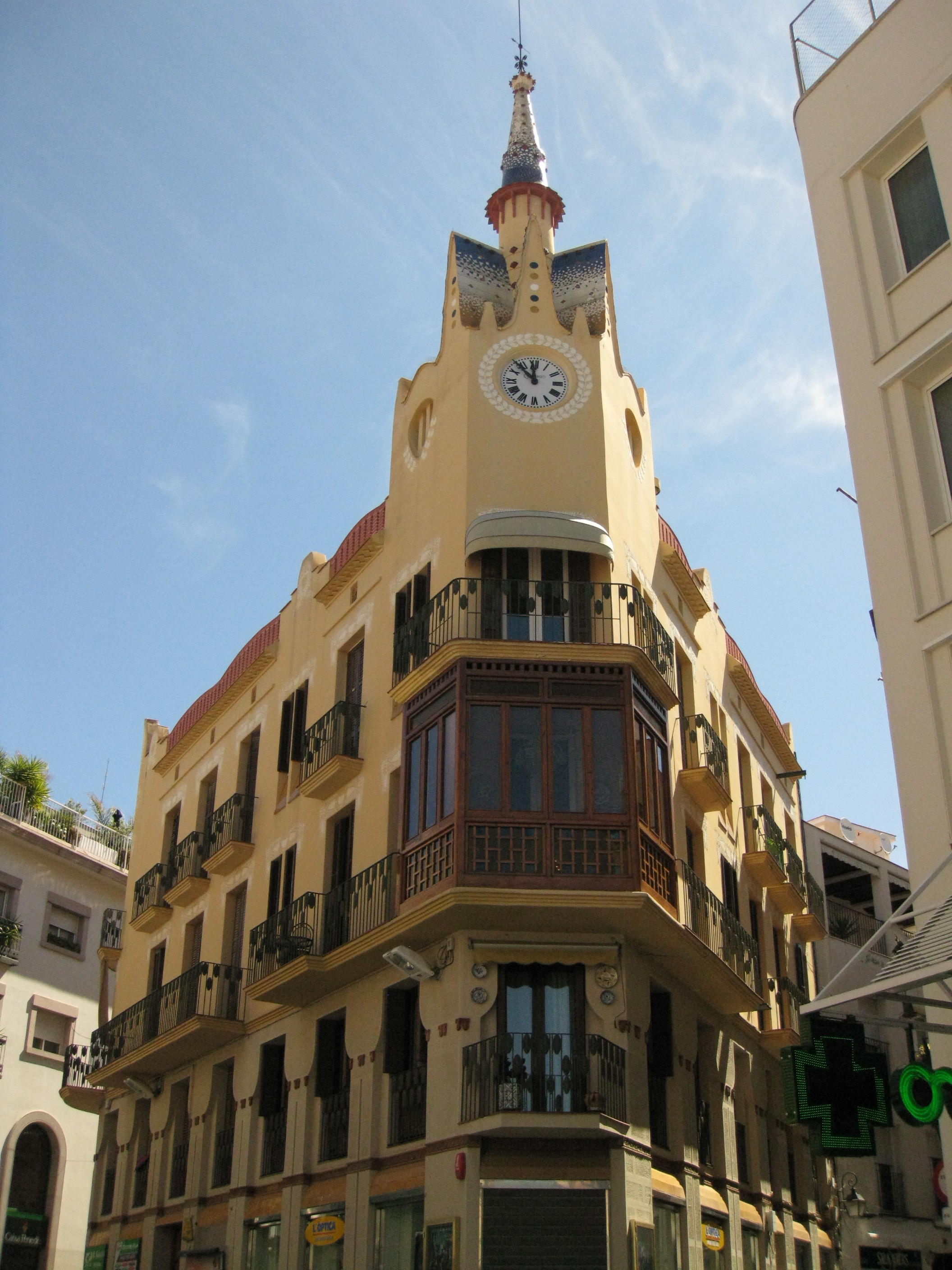
Can Bartomeu (1915), also known as La Casa del Rellotge (The Clock House), one of Sitges' most iconic buildings.

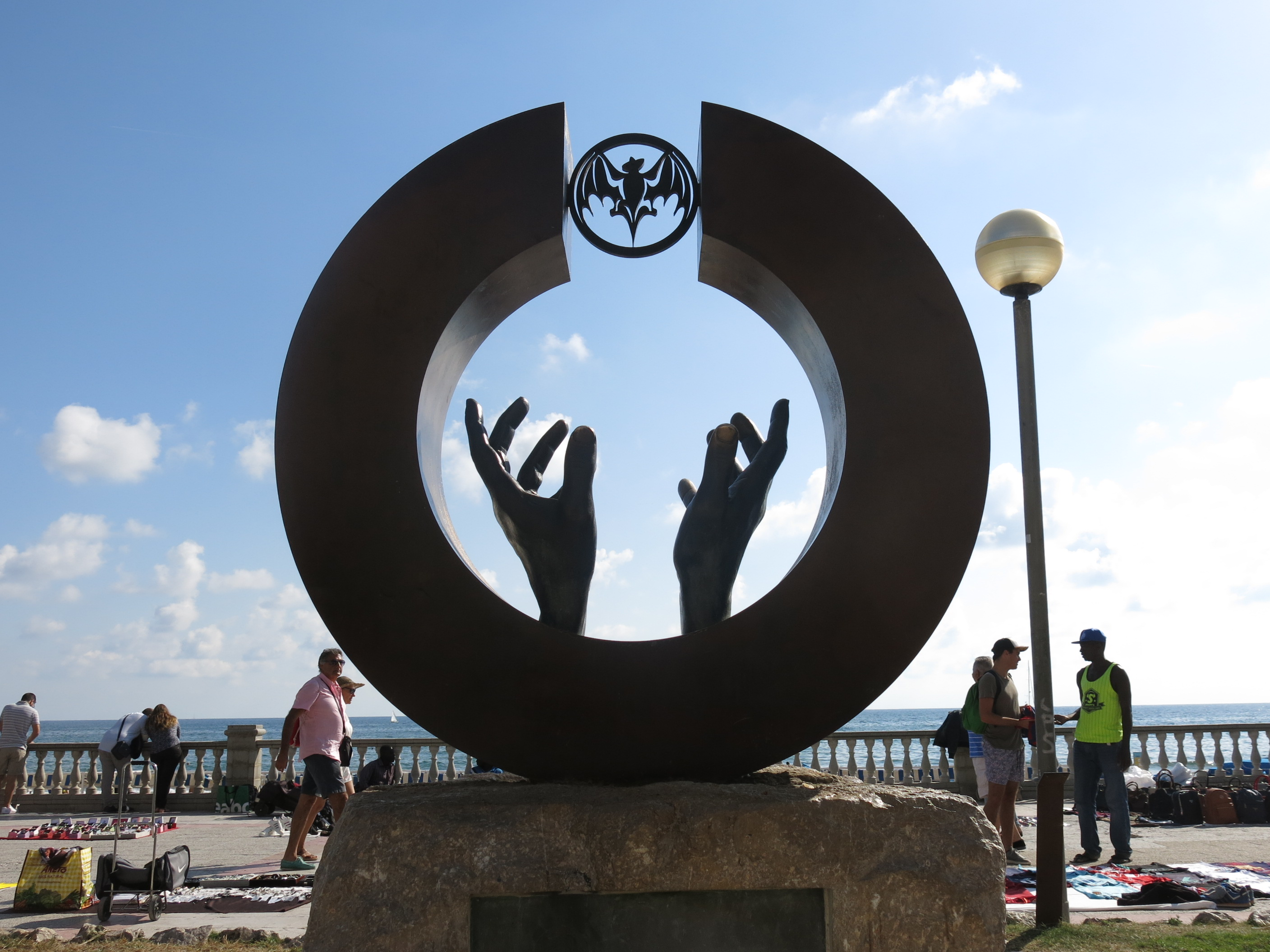
Monument to Facundo Bacardí (2009), by Lorenzo Quinn.

=== Climate ===
Climate data for Sitges (1981–2010)
Month	Jan	Feb	Mar	Apr	May	Jun	Jul	Aug	Sep	Oct	Nov	Dec	Year
Mean daily maximum °C (°F)	13.8 (56.8)	14.6 (58.3)	16.6 (61.9)	18.4 (65.1)	21.3 (70.3)	24.8 (76.6)	27.4 (81.3)	27.4 (81.3)	24.8 (76.6)	21.3 (70.3)	17.0 (62.6)	14.4 (57.9)	20.2 (68.3)
Mean daily minimum °C (°F)	5.4 (41.7)	5.8 (42.4)	7.6 (45.7)	9.4 (48.9)	12.5 (54.5)	16.0 (60.8)	18.6 (65.5)	18.9 (66.0)	16.4 (61.5)	13.0 (55.4)	8.8 (47.8)	6.3 (43.3)	11.6 (52.8)
Average rainfall mm (inches)	40.1 (1.58)	30.0 (1.18)	31.5 (1.24)	44.1 (1.74)	46.0 (1.81)	24.6 (0.97)	15.3 (0.60)	53.8 (2.12)	78.5 (3.09)	79.5 (3.13)	54.8 (2.16)	40.9 (1.61)	539.1 (21.23)
Source: World Meteorological Organization

== Carnival ==
For over a century, Sitges has celebrated Carnestoltes, or Carnival, between the months of February and March, according to the liturgical calendar. The festivities begin on Dijous Gras, or Fat Thursday, with King Carnestoltes' arrival. They continue until the burial of the sardine — late afternoon on Ash Wednesday.

Folk dances and xatonades (traditional local salad served with assorted omelets) are also characteristic carnival elements. The two most important moments are the Rua de la Disbauxa, or the Debauchery Parade, on Sunday night and the Rua de l'Extermini, or Extermination Parade, on Tuesday night. Around forty floats with more than 2,000 participants fill Sitges. Many people come from all around to see it, describing it as a favourite time of year because of the celebration..

== Festivals and regular events ==
Beyond the Sitges Carnival, Sitges is the destination for several other international activities.

- June: Sitges Gay pride, one of the top LGBTQ+ celebrations, with a 5-day festival featuring open-air concerts, outdoor shows, parties and parades and Month of the Corpus Christi celebration, a festival with 6 centuries of history, featuring the creation of numerous flower carpets throughout the city center prior to the procession
- July/August: Terramar festival, a summer concert series
- August: Festa Major, one of the city's main festivities celebrating its patron saints with traditional dances, street decorations, castells (human towers), and fireworks
- September: Bear week Sitges, attracting a LGBTQ+ crowd for activities, concerts and parties
- October: Sitges Film Festival, an international festival dedicated to fantasy and horror films. It brings in filmmakers and fans from across the globe for screenings and events

== Gastronomy ==
Xató is Sitges' most typical dish. Its first recorded mention is in local newspaper Eco de Sitges report on Fat Thursday, published on 16 February 1896. The report refers to a meal that three days before had gathered together a selected group of Catalan artists and intellectuals, including Santiago Rusiñol, Miquel Utrillo and Gaietà Buigas. The name "xató" comes from an expression pronounced years before by Canudas, a member of the Rusiñol's group.

Malvasia is a delicate liquor wine served in Sitges, primarily with dessert. The name "malvasia" comes from the Peloponnesian port Monemvasía.

== Museums ==
- Cau Ferrat Museum
- Museu Romàntic Can Llopis
- Maricel Museum
- Fundació Stämpfli Contemporary Art

== Beaches ==
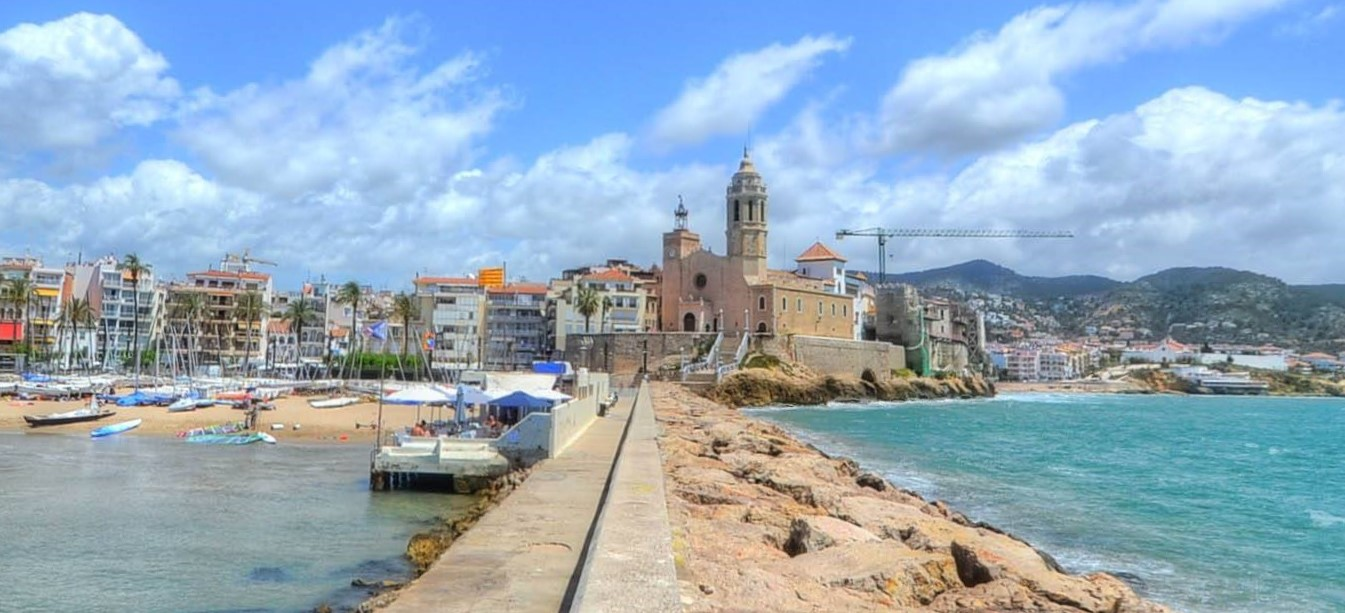
The Beach and Church of Sant Bartomeu i Santa Tecla (church built in 17th-century with numerous later modifications.)

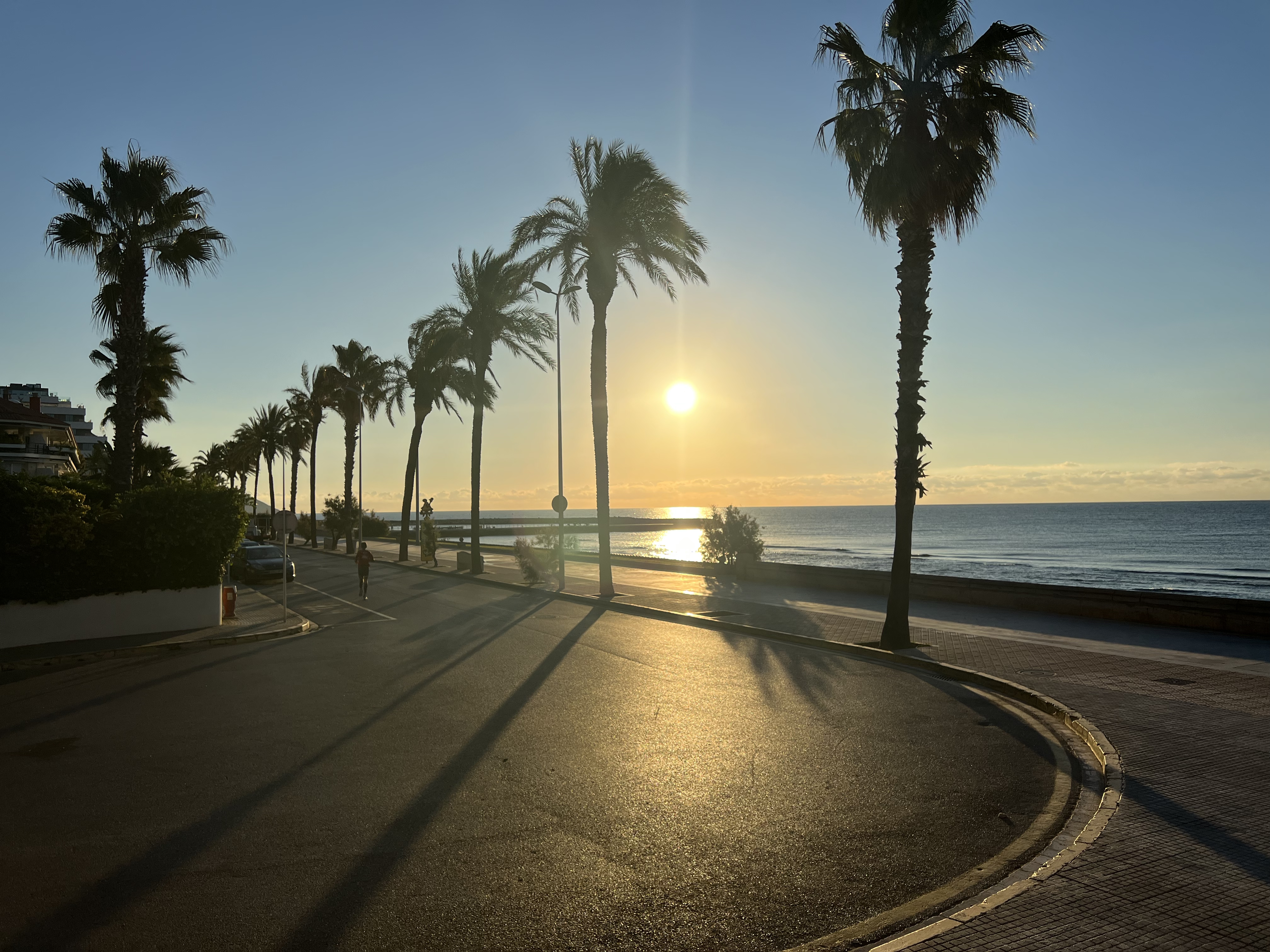
Passeig Marítim Sitges at sunrise

Since 1956, the construction of breakwaters and ports has led to a considerable expansion of the beach surface. Sitges has 17 sand beaches. Four of them are in the east: the first one called Les Botigues at the beginning of the coast, next to the beaches of Castelldefels and the other three are following the coast of Garraf (Road C-31). One of them is Garraf village beach.

There are eleven beaches in the town and two to its west, which are difficult to access.

There are three main nudist beaches located in Sitges. One of which is Platja dels Balmins, the second nudist beach is Platja d'Aiguadolç, both of these beaches are populated by all members of the community. The third nudist beach is Playa del Muerto, which is more populated by the gay community. Platja dels Balmins and Platja d'Aiguadolç are located on the eastern side of Sitges while Playa del Muerto is located on the western side of Sitges and is more difficult to reach.

Sitges is Catalonia's leader in coastal excellence. Nine of its beaches and 2 local marinas consistently earn the prestigious Blue Flag distinction. It has also been awarded the Biosphere Destination certificate in recognition of its commitment to sustainable tourism and environmental best practices.

== Education ==
There are six public Catalan primary schools in Sitges: Escola Agnès de Sitges, Escola Esteve Barrachina, Escola Maria Ossó, Escola Miquel Utrillo, Escola Pia Sitges, and the catholic Camp Joliu.

Private schools include the French Lycée Bel Air, and the English Richmond International and The Olive Tree School.

The British School of Barcelona (BSB) also operates a campus in Sitges, providing education for primary (3–11 years), located in the upscale neighbourhood of Vallpineda.

The Institute of the Arts Barcelona is an international leader in performing arts training and education college based out of Terramar.

== LGBT Culture ==
Sitges is one of the world's top leaders in the protection and advocating for equal rights for the LGBT community. It is often described as the gay capital of Europe, particularly in peak season of the summer months of May to September.

Sitges has become one of the top holiday spots for LGBT tourists, and contains a large number of gay-friendly hotels, restaurants, shops, and bars.

The key gay events are Carnival, Sitges Pride, Bears Week, Festa Major, and Circuit Barcelona.

== Sister cities ==
- Bagnères-de-Luchon (France)

== Motor racing ==
Sitges is part of the long history of motor racing in Catalonia. From 1908 to 1920, events were staged over public roads from Sitges to Canyelles to Vilanova i la Geltrú, and from Mataró to Vilassar de Mar and Argentona. In 1922 and 1923, the Real Moto Club de Catalunya ran the Penya Rhin Grand Prix over a 9-mile circuit around the town of Vilafranca del Penedès until it was replaced by a short lived purpose built circuit, the banked Autódromo de Sitges-Terramar, which is still visible at 41°14′18.35″N 1°46′50.20″E. Albert Divo won the only Spanish Grand Prix held at the banked Sitges Terramar driving a Sunbeam.

Another yearly event involving Cars is the International Vintage Car rally held every year in March since 1959 and involving Oldtimer cars and motorcycles produced before 1928. The rally starts in barcelona and arrives in Sitges through the scenic, winding Garraf road with all participants wearing period costumes.

== Notable residents ==
- Facundo Bacardí (1814–1886), businessman
- Miguel Condé (1939), painter
- Rafael Font Farran (1912–2003), politician and journalist
- Mir Geribert (died 1060), Catalan nobleman
- Arcadi Mas i Fondevila (1852–1934), artist
- Santiago Rusiñol (1861–1931), artist
- Joan Sella i Montserrat (born 1960), journalist, writer and gastronomy critic
- Christopher Small (1927–2011), musician and ethnomusicologist

== Gallery ==
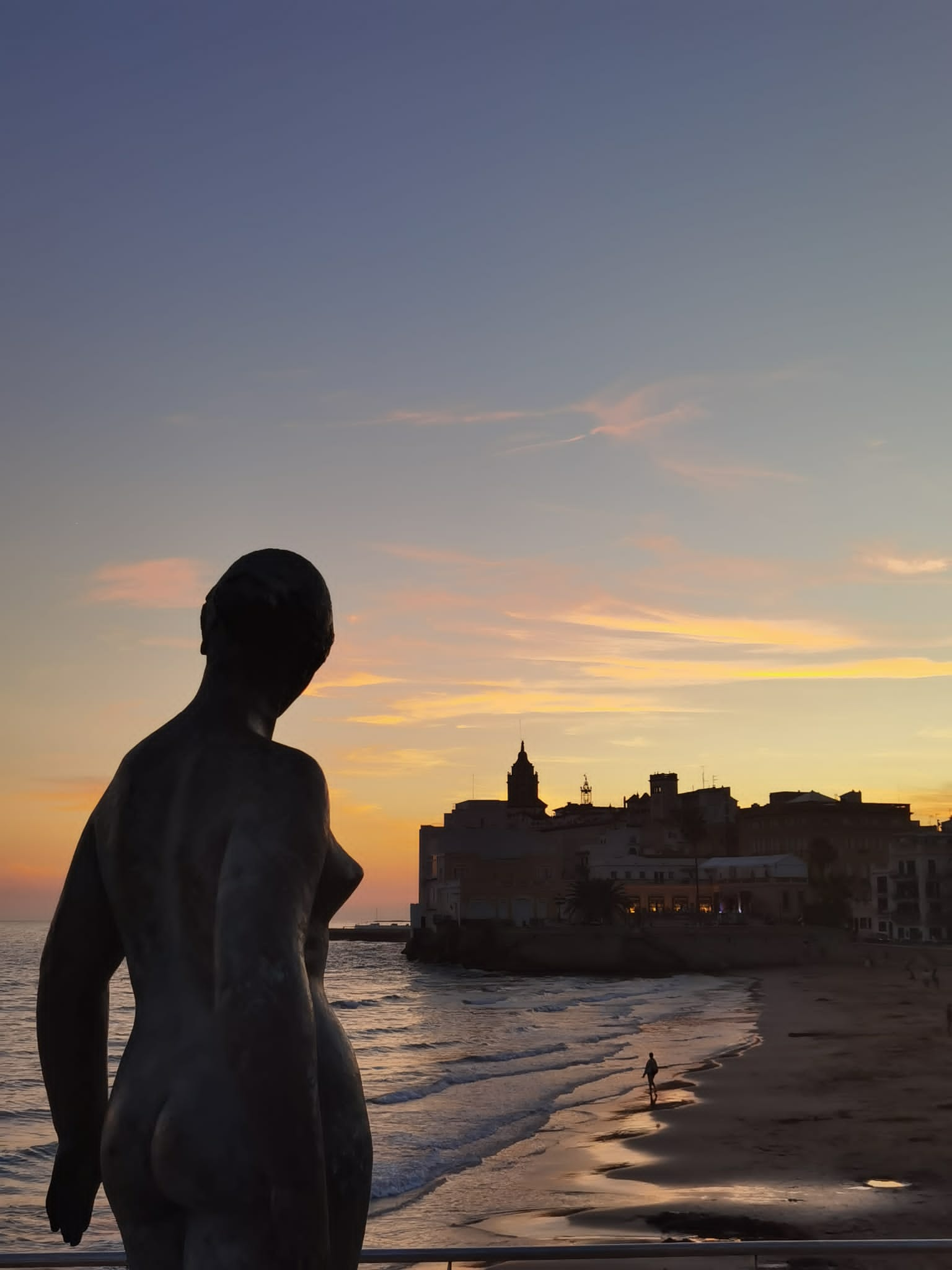
Sunset in Sitges

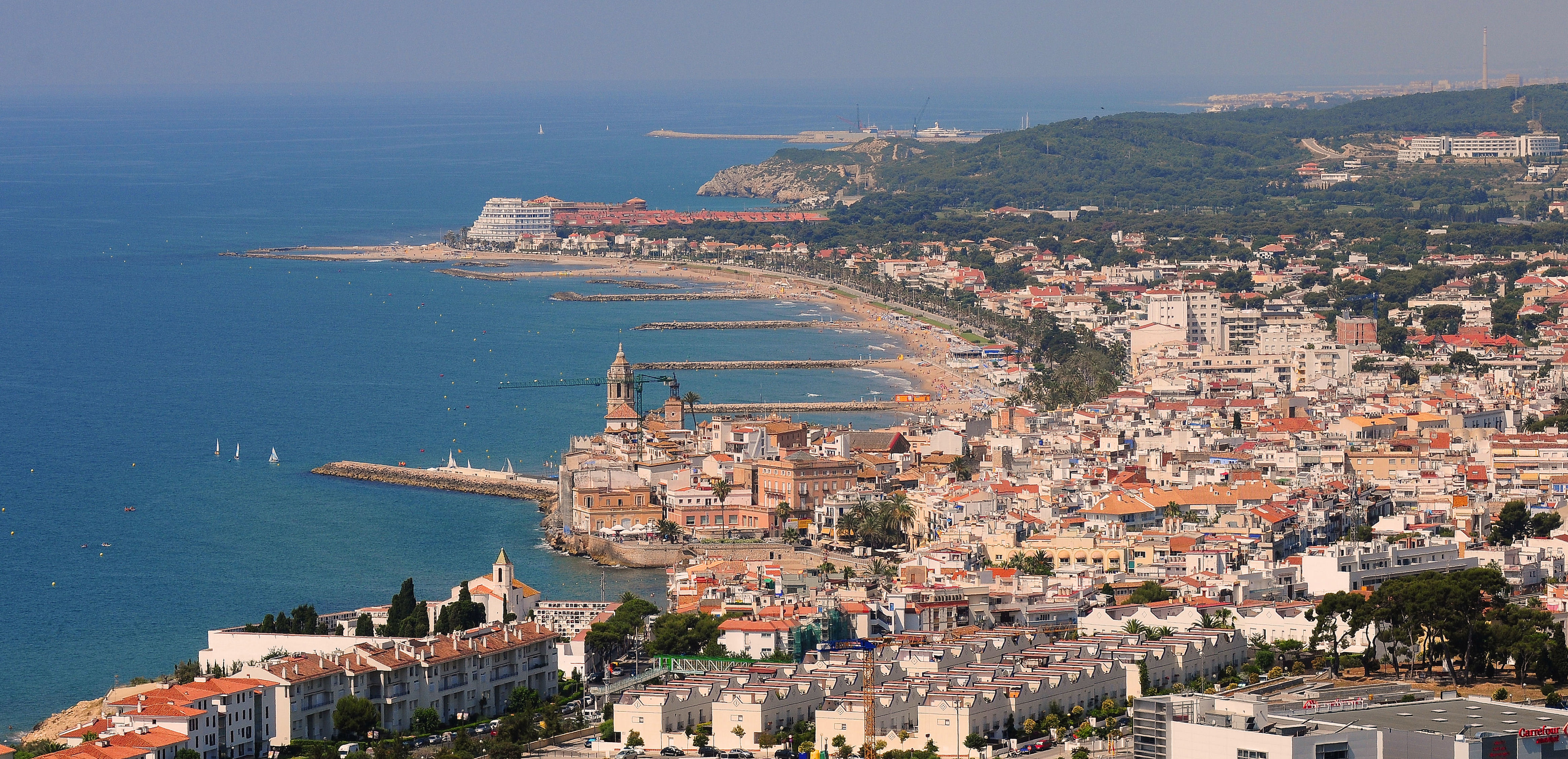
Aerial view of the town

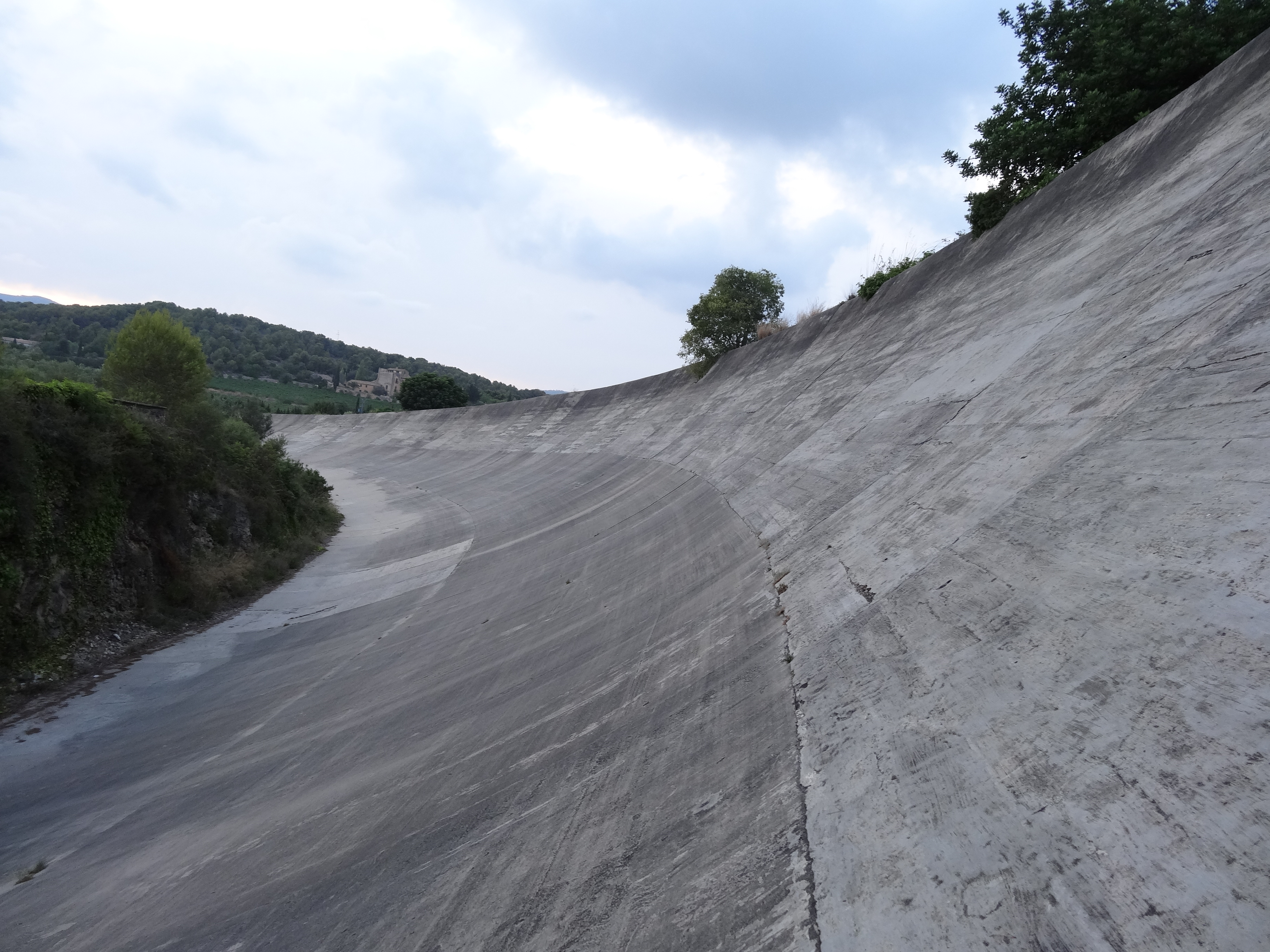
The famously steep banks of the Autódromo de Sitges-Terramar

== See also ==
- Sitges Film Festival
- Sitges railway station
