= Vilafranca del Penedès =

- Municipality
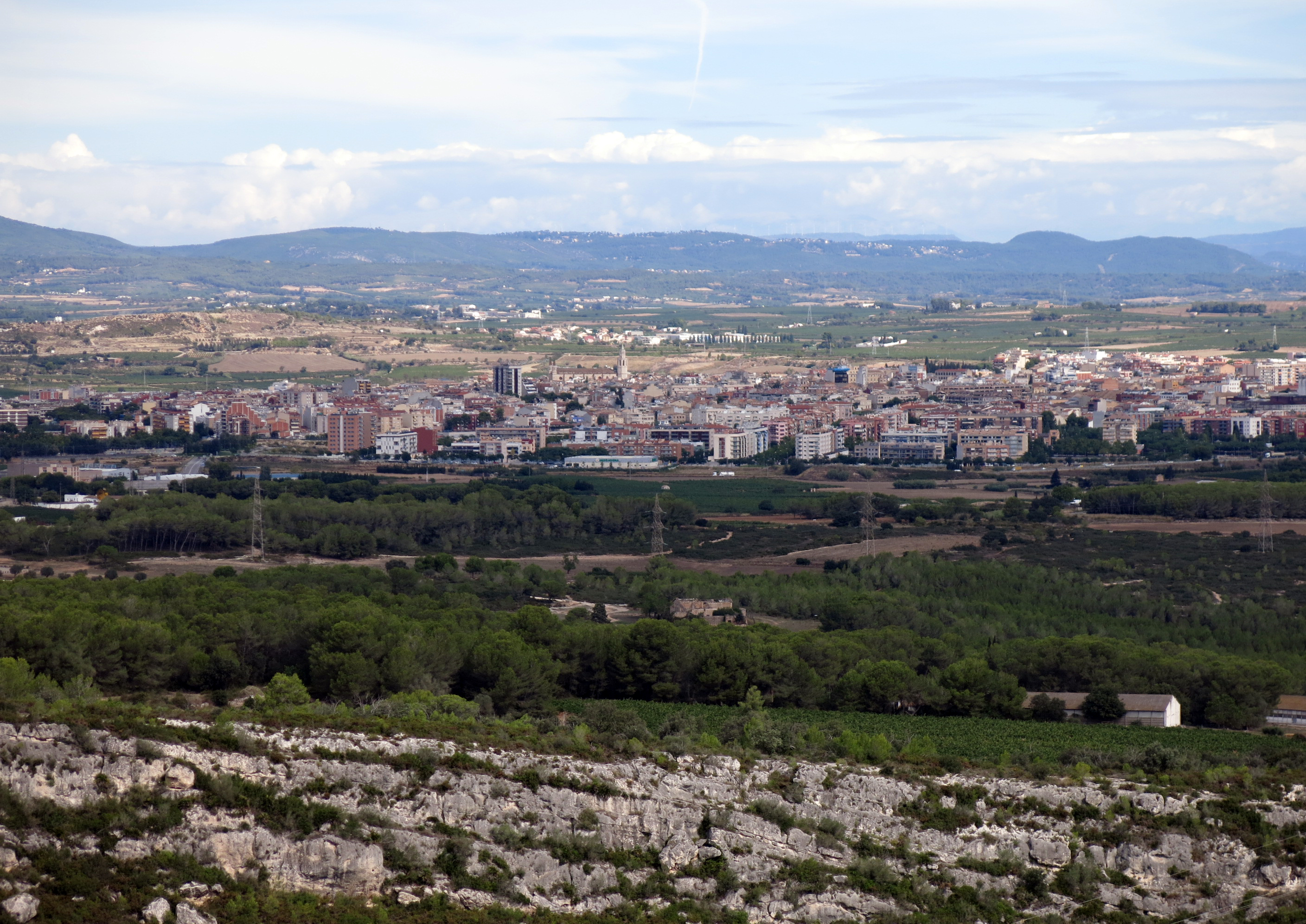
- Vilafranca del Penedès

- Coat of arms

- Location in Alt Penedès county

- Location within Catalonia Location within Spain
- Coordinates: 41°20′53.75″N 1°41′34.60″E
- Sovereign state: Spain
- Community: Catalonia
- Region: Penedès
- County: Alt Penedès
- Province: Barcelona

Government
  - Mayor: Francisco Romero Gamarra (2023) (PSC)

Area
  - Total: 19.6 km^{2} (7.6 sq mi)
- Elevation: 223 m (732 ft)

Population (2025-01-01)
  - Total: 42,607
  - Density: 2,170/km^{2} (5,630/sq mi)
- Demonym(s): Vilafranquí, vilafranquina
- Postal code: 08720
- Climate: Csa
- Website: vilafranca.cat

Vilafranca del Penedès, (Note: Catalan pronunciation: [ˌbiləˈfɾaŋkə ðəl pənəˈðɛs]) or simply Vilafranca, is the capital of Alt Penedès county in Penedès, Catalonia, Spain. It is situated in the Penedès Depression on the left bank of the Foix River, and on the main axis of communication from Barcelona to Tarragona and Valencia, served by a Rodalies Barcelona line 4 and by the AP-7 autopista as well as by the C-243 towards Sant Sadurní d'Anoia, and C-15 (formerly called C-244) roads to Vilanova i la Geltrú and Igualada respectively.

== History ==
The town was founded in the middle of the 12th century as a result of the decline of Olèrdola, which had been until then the main local centre. It was established as the seat of a vegueria in 1304. The Corts were held in the town in 1218 under King James I of Aragon, and again in 1358–59 and in 1367. King Peter III of Aragon died while staying at the royal palace in Vilafranca in 1285. Vilafranca is the birthplace of Raymond of Penyafort, O.P., a Catalonian Dominican (O.P.) friar born around 1175. St. Raymond compiled the Decretals of Gregory IX, a collection of canon law that remained the major corpus of canon law in the Roman Catholic Church until the 1917 and 1983 Codes of Canon Law. He was also instrumental in the founding of the Mercedarian Friars.

== Main sights ==
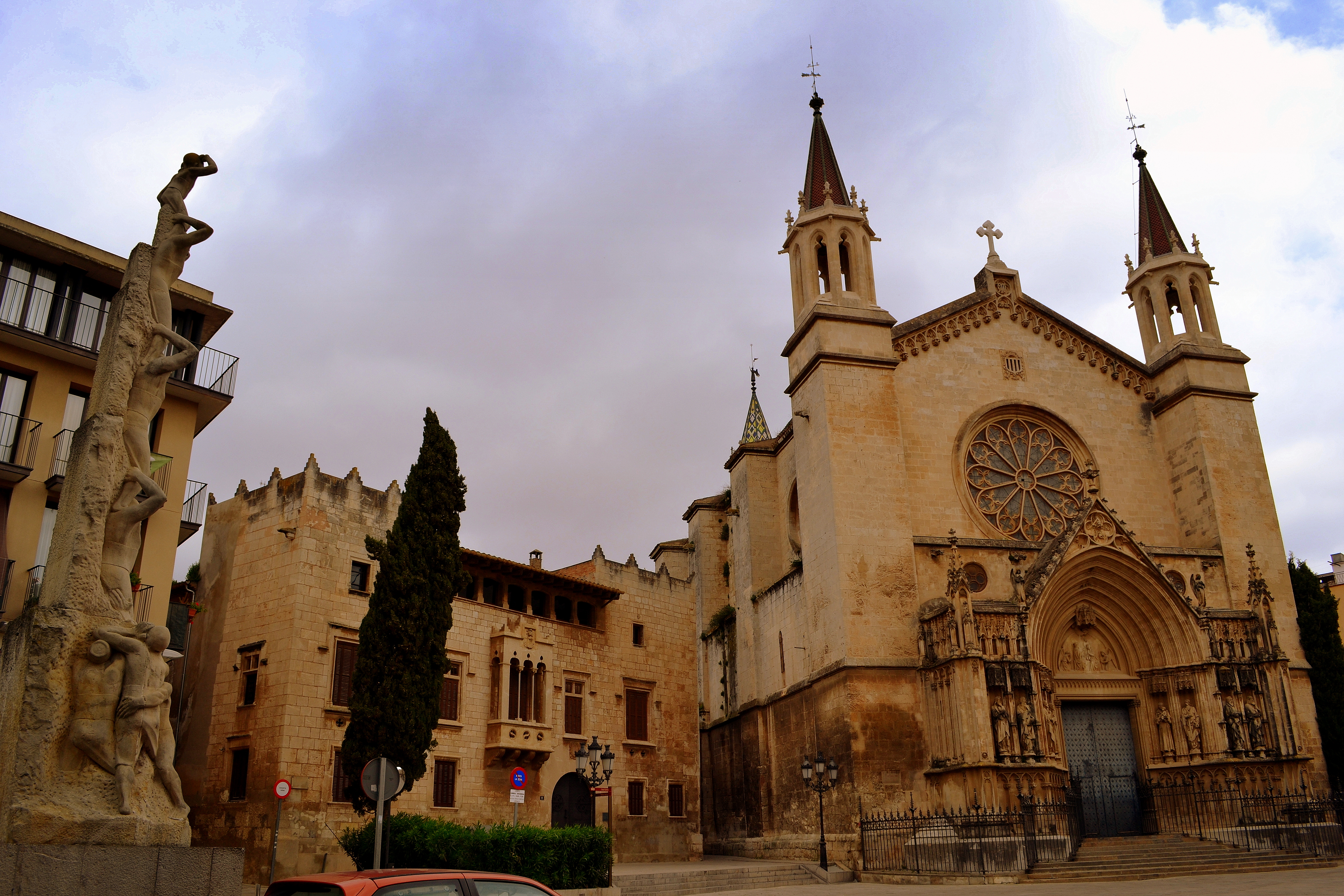
Plaça de Jaume I (Vilafranca del Penedès)

The gothic church of Santa Maria, the royal palace (Palau Reial) and the Palau Balta, are situated in the historic town centre. The Palau Reial, from the thirteenth century houses the town museum, with collections of archeology, paleontology, ornithology, ceramics and sacred art, and a Museum dedicated to Wine (Vinseum).

Other notable monuments include the church of Sant Joan, the convent of Sant Francesc and a number of old merchants' houses such as the Palau del Fraret, Palau Macià, the Casal dels Gomà and the Casal del Marquès d'Alfarràs.

== Economy ==
Vilafranca is a centre for the local wine industry, along with neighbouring Sant Sadurní d'Anoia. Other local industries include textiles, metallurgy, food processing and construction materials. It is also an important commercial centre.

Vilafranca is also the birthplace of the Penedesenca fowl, famous for their chocolate-coloured eggs.

== Demography ==
Vilafranca del Penedès has grown steadily at the expense of the more rural areas of Alt Penedès, aided by its excellent transport links and by the strength of the local economy (particularly the wine industry).

== Subdivisions ==
Four outlying villages are included within the municipality of Vilafranca del Penedès (populations as of 2005):

- El Bordellet (9)
- El Molí d'en Rovira (166)
- Perepau (87)
- Les Salines (85)

== Motor racing history ==
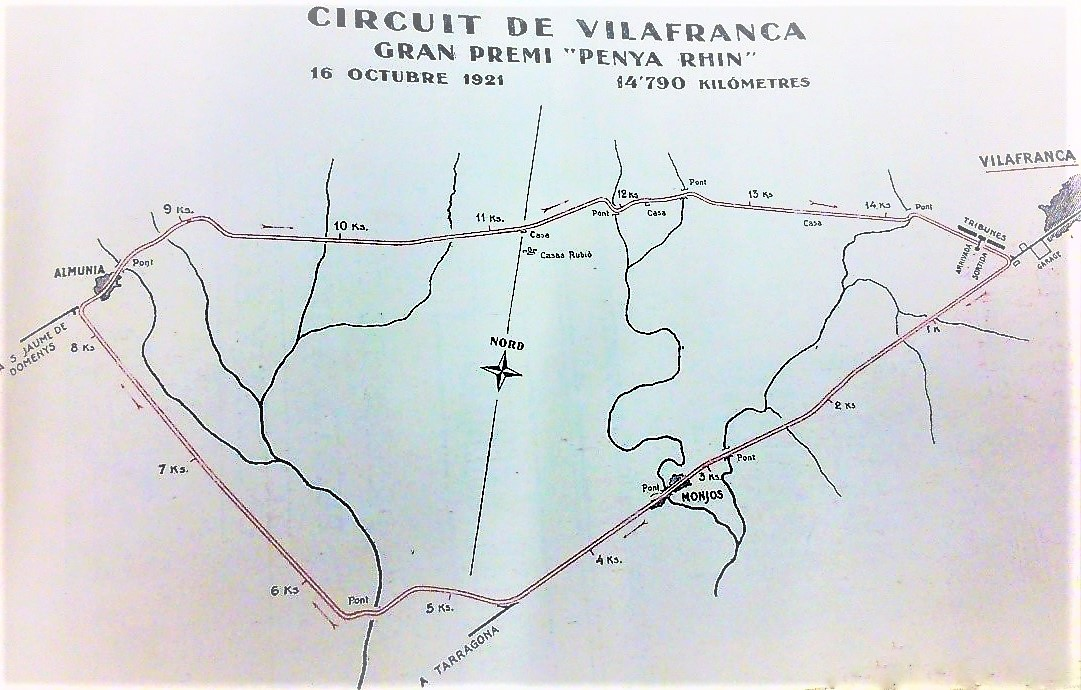
Circuit map

Vilafranca del Penedès is part of the long history of motor racing in Catalonia. From 1908 to 1920, events were staged over public roads from Sitges to Canyelles and Vilanova i la Geltrú, and from Mataró to Vilassar de Mar and Argentona. Between 1921 and 1923 the RMCC ran the Penya Rhin Grand Prix over a 9-mile circuit around the town of Vilafranca del Penedès until it was replaced by a short lived purpose built circuit, the Sitges Terramar.
