= Vilanova i la Geltrú railway station =

Railway station in Catalonia, Spain

Estació de Vilanova i la Geltrú
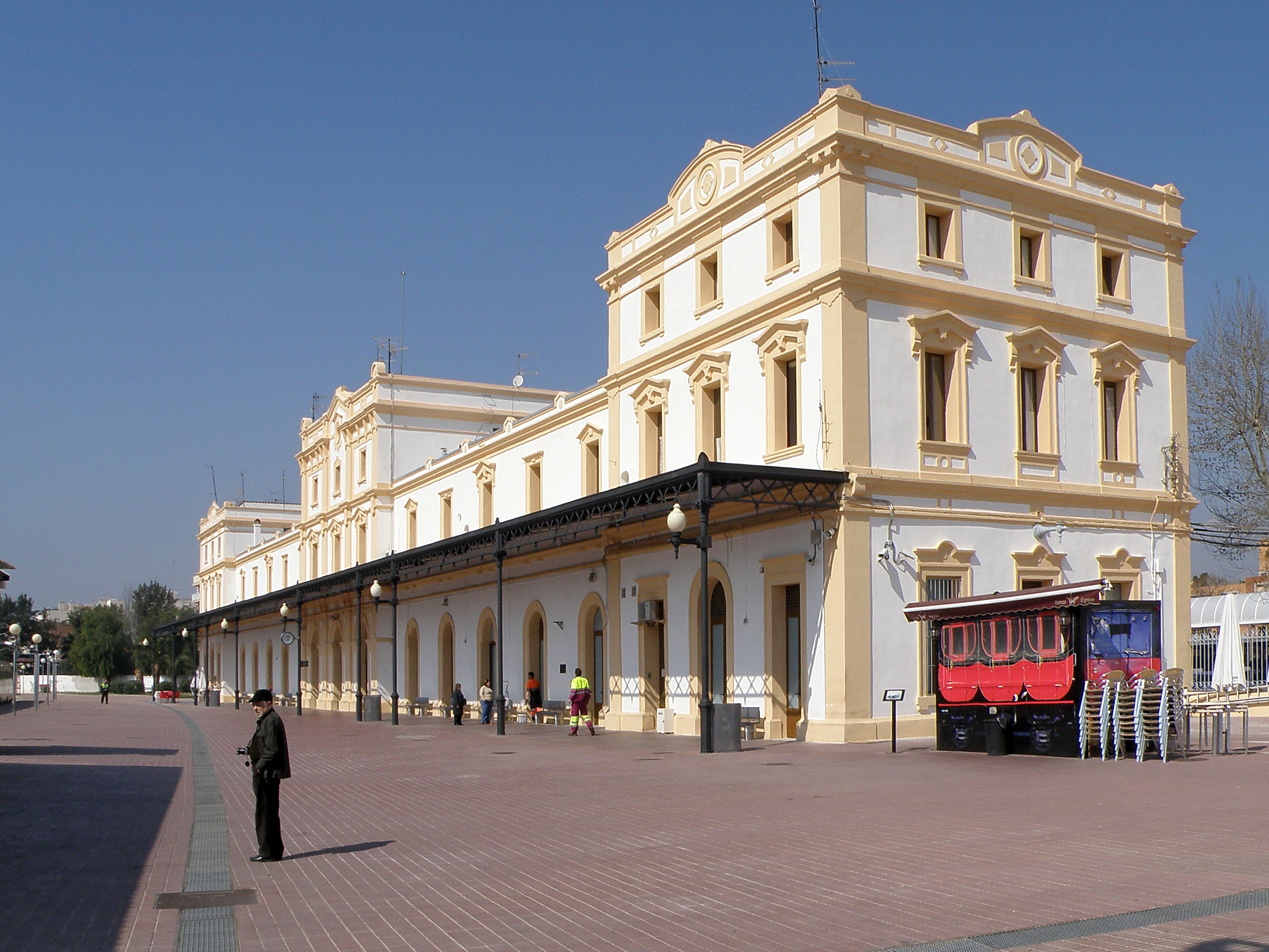
- Vilanova i la Geltrú railway station in 2012

General information
- Location: Spain
- Coordinates: 41°13′13.0″N 1°43′50.8″E
- System: Rodalies de Catalunya
- Owner: Adif
- Platforms: 5
- Tracks: 8
- Train operators: Renfe Operadora

Construction
- Architect: Cels Xauradó

Other information
- Station code: 71700
- Fare zone: 4A

Services
Preceding station	Rodalies de Catalunya	Following station
Cubellas towards Sant Vicenç de Calders	R2 Sud	Sitges towards Barcelona Estació de França
Cubellas Some Regional (R) trains only towards Lleida Pirineus	R13	Sitges Some Regional (R) trains only towards Barcelona Estació de França
Cubellas Some Regional (R) trains only towards Lleida Pirineus	R14	Sitges Some Regional (R) trains only towards Barcelona Estació de França
Sant Vicenç de Calders towards Riba-roja d'Ebre	R15	Viladecans towards Barcelona Estació de França
Sant Vicenç de Calders towards Ulldecona-Alcanar-La Sénia or Tortosa	R16	Barcelona Sants towards Barcelona Estació de França
Sant Vicenç de Calders towards Port Aventura	R17	Barcelona Sants towards Barcelona Estació de França

Other services
Location

Vilanova i la Geltrú is a railway station owned by Administrador de Infraestructuras Ferroviarias (Adif) located in the town of Vilanova i la Geltrú, in the Garraf region. The station is on the Barcelona-Vilanova-Vallès line, where trains run on the R2 Sud suburban line and the R13, R14, R15, R16 and R17 regional lines of Rodalies de Catalunya, services operated by Renfe Operadora.

It is the head of part of the suburban trains and next to the station is the Railway Museum of Catalonia, where there is a large collection of steam locomotives.

The number of passengers carried in 2016 was 2,637,000 people, making it the busiest station in terms of passenger numbers outside Barcelona in the ADIF network in Catalonia. Of these passengers, 2,534,000 travelled on commuter services and 103,000 on regional services.

== History ==
The first concession for the Barcelona-Tarragona railway line was granted to Magí de Grau from Vilanova on 15 May 1851 and in 1861 a Royal Decree was published in favour of the railway passing through the town. However, the completion of the railway project for Vilanova can be considered as a result of the personal effort of Francesc Gumà i Ferran, who obtained authorisation to build the railway between Valls, Vilanova and Barcelona in January 1877 (publication of the law in the Gaceta de Madrid, the official journal of Spain, on 13 January 1877).

The financing of the work did not include State subsidies, but was carried out by public subscription and Gumà's personal contributions. With the capital raised, the Companyia del Ferrocarril was established on 28 June 1878 under the management of F. Gumà and on 10 July 1878 construction began. The inauguration of the Barcelona-Vilanova route took place on 29 December 1881. The station building was built in 1881 according to the plans of the master builder Cels Xauradó.

This station on the Vilanova line entered service in 1881 when the section between Hortes de Sant Beltran next to the Barcelona Royal Shipyard (Drassanes de Barcelona) and Vilanova i la Geltrú was opened. Later in 1887, with the connection of the line with the Vilafranca line, trains stopped passing through the Morrot road, to pass through the current route through Bellvitge. In the 20th century, work was carried out on the line to double the tracks.

== Station building ==
The station building is an eclectic work of cast-iron architecture protected as a Cultural Asset of Local Interest. ca:Bé cultural d'interès local, es:Bien cultural de interés local

It is an isolated building formed by three ground floor and two-storey bodies, which occupy the center and the two ends of the construction respectively, and by two ground floor and one-storey bodies that join the others. The result is a building of symmetrical composition. The openings are rectangular except for the access door, which is a semicircular arch. The structure of the main façade is repeated on the platform part. The roofs are on two slopes on the higher bodies and with terraces in the intermediate ones. The use of cast iron is remarkable, visible on the roof of part of the platform and on the columns that support it, as well as on the columns in the lobby.

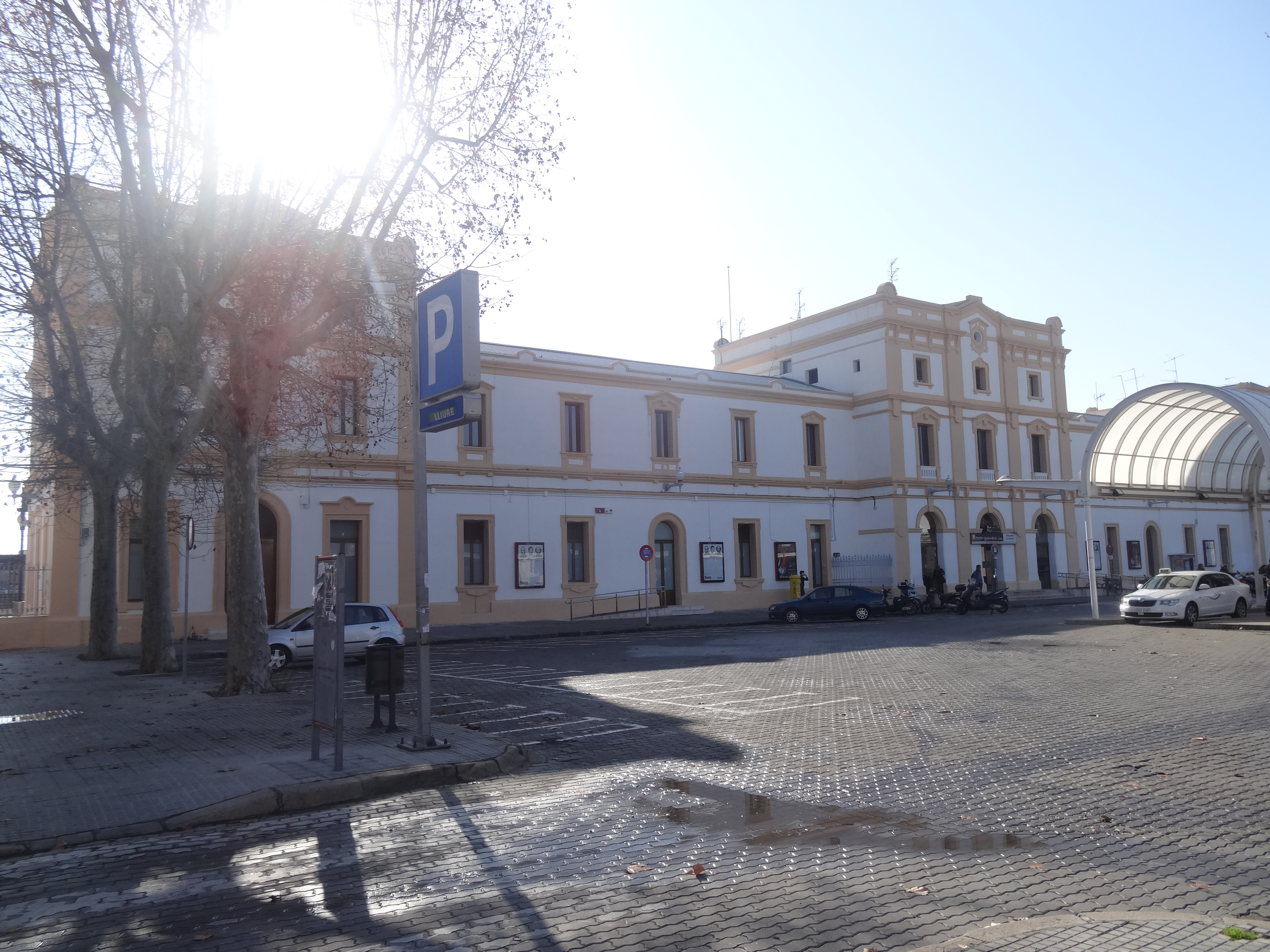
The entrance and station building

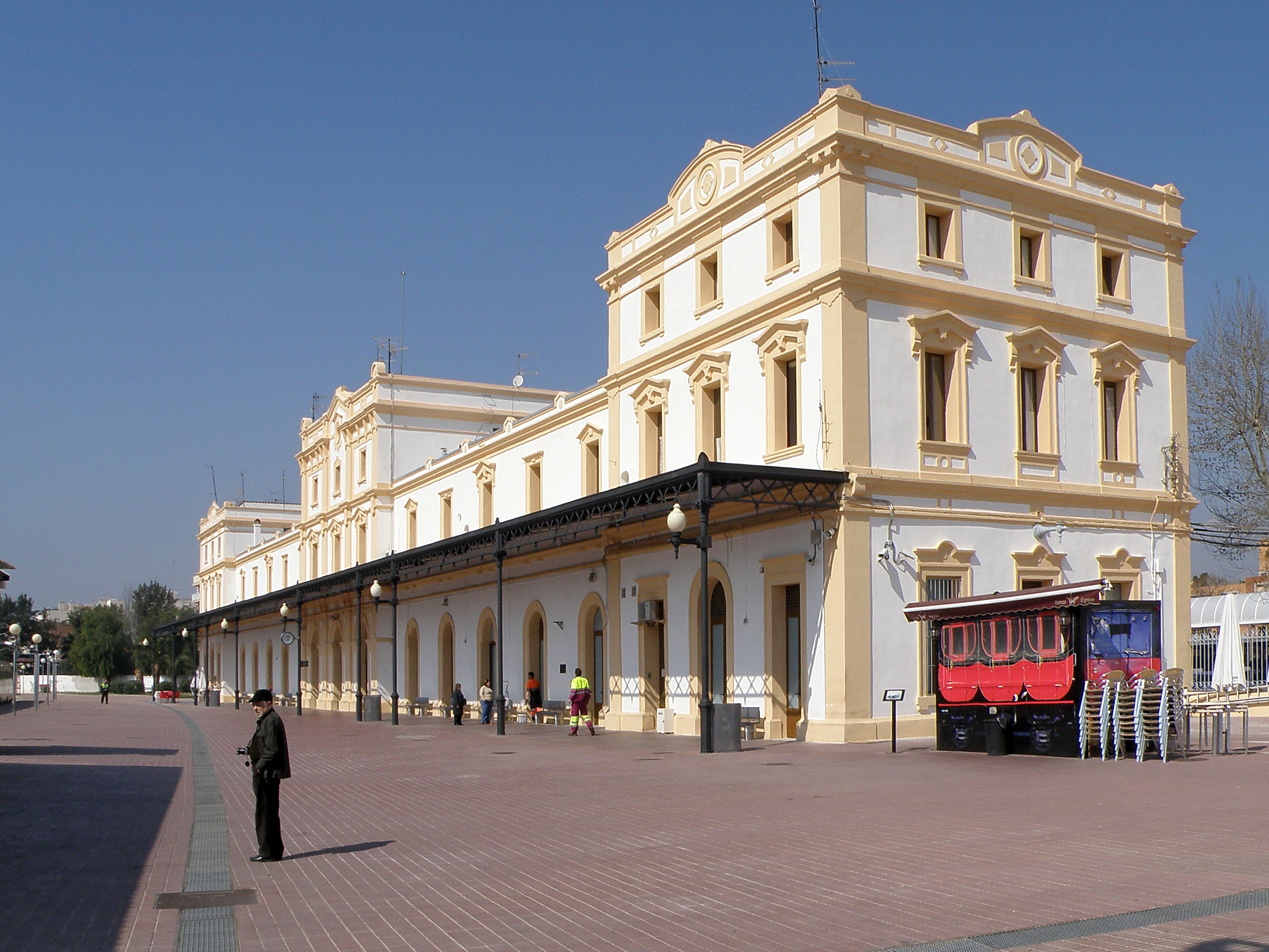
Façade next to the platforms

== See also ==
- Rodalies de Catalunya
- Railway Museum of Catalonia
- Ferrocarrils de la Generalitat de Catalunya
