= Mir Geribert =

11th-century Catalan nobleman

Mir Geribert (died 1060) was a Catalan nobleman and a rebel against the Count of Barcelona for almost two decades (1040–1059) as the self-declared "Prince of Olèrdola". His revolt was merely the longest and most severe of what was then endemic to Catalonia: private feudal warfare, which was theoretically restricted by the Peace and Truce of God, and disavowal of comital prerogatives by the castellans who nominally owed their positions to the count.

Mir Geribert was related to both the counts and viscounts of Barcelona, being a son of viscount Geribert II and Ermengard, daughter of Count Borrell II. His powerbase lay in the Penedès, where he had many castles, chief among them Olèrdola. Despite his wide-ranging possessions in that region, he had been marginalised as a member of a cadet branch of the vicecomital dynasty and was unwilling to accept his second-tier position within the Penedès or his exclusion from the familial possessions in La Guàrdia and Barcelona. He refused to accept a wife of any other than the comital dynasty of the Bellonids and insisted on placing himself on equal footing with his relatives of the main vicecomital branch, which ambition led to violent confrontations.

These conflicts were not, however, with his relatives, such as his cousin the viscount Udalard II or his uncle the bishop Guisalbert, but with the count, Raymond Berengar I, who refused to grant him a bride from his own family. Though both Udalard and Guisalbert got into a war with the count at this same moment, it was not related directly to Mir's rebellion.

In 1039, Mir's brother, Folc Geribert, granted the castle of Ribes near Olèrdola to their uncle the bishop. Thus deprived of any control over an important frontier fortress, Mir negotiated for the return of the castle in 1041, when he received it back from the bishop in return for swearing homage.

At some point in his battle with Raymond Berengar, Mir assumed the title princeps Olerdulae, which implied independent authority. Raymond Berengar countered by claiming princely authority in his marches. After Mir lost a claim against the monastery of Sant Cugat del Vallès, he openly defied the court and the Visigothic law.

In 1052 or 1053, a tribunal presided over by the seneschal Amat Eldric condemned Mir Geribert. In response to this, Mir devastated the lands of the seneschal and of Raymond of Cerdanya, who had made peace with the count. Already before 1052 Renard Guillem, the younger brother of the count of Cerdanya, had been treated disgracefully (with mala et onta) by Mir Geribert while on a mission for the Count of Barcelona.

In 1059, Mir Geribert and his followers made their final submission to the count, relinquishing his disputed rights in the Penedès and Ausona. He and his wife Guisla promised to make their eldest sons, Bernat and Arnau, renounce the family's claims to the disputed castles and honores (benefices) when they attained their majority, to make their younger sons sign the charter donating Castell de Port to the count, and to extract oaths of fidelity from their sons in accordance with their own oaths.

Mir Geribert died at Tortosa in 1060.

== Sources ==
- Bensch, Stephen P. Barcelona and Its Rulers, 1096–1291. Cambridge: Cambridge University Press, 1995. ISBN 0-521-43511-0.
- Bisson, Thomas N. The Medieval Crown of Aragon: A Short History. Oxford: Clarendon Press, 1986. ISBN 0-19-821987-3.
- Freedman, Paul. The Diocese of Vic: Tradition and Regeneration in Medieval Catalonia. New Jersey: Rutgers University Press, 1983.
- Kagay, Donald J., trans. The Usatges of Barcelona: The Fundamental Law of Catalonia. Philadelphia: University of Pennsylvania Press, 1994.
- Kosto, Adam J. Making Agreements in Medieval Catalonia: Power, order, and the written word, 1000–1200. Cambridge: Cambridge University Press, 2001. ISBN 0-521-79239-8.
- Shideler, John C. A Medieval Catalan Noble Family: the Montcadas, 1000–1230. Berkeley: University of California Press, 1983.
