= Olèrdola =

- Municipality
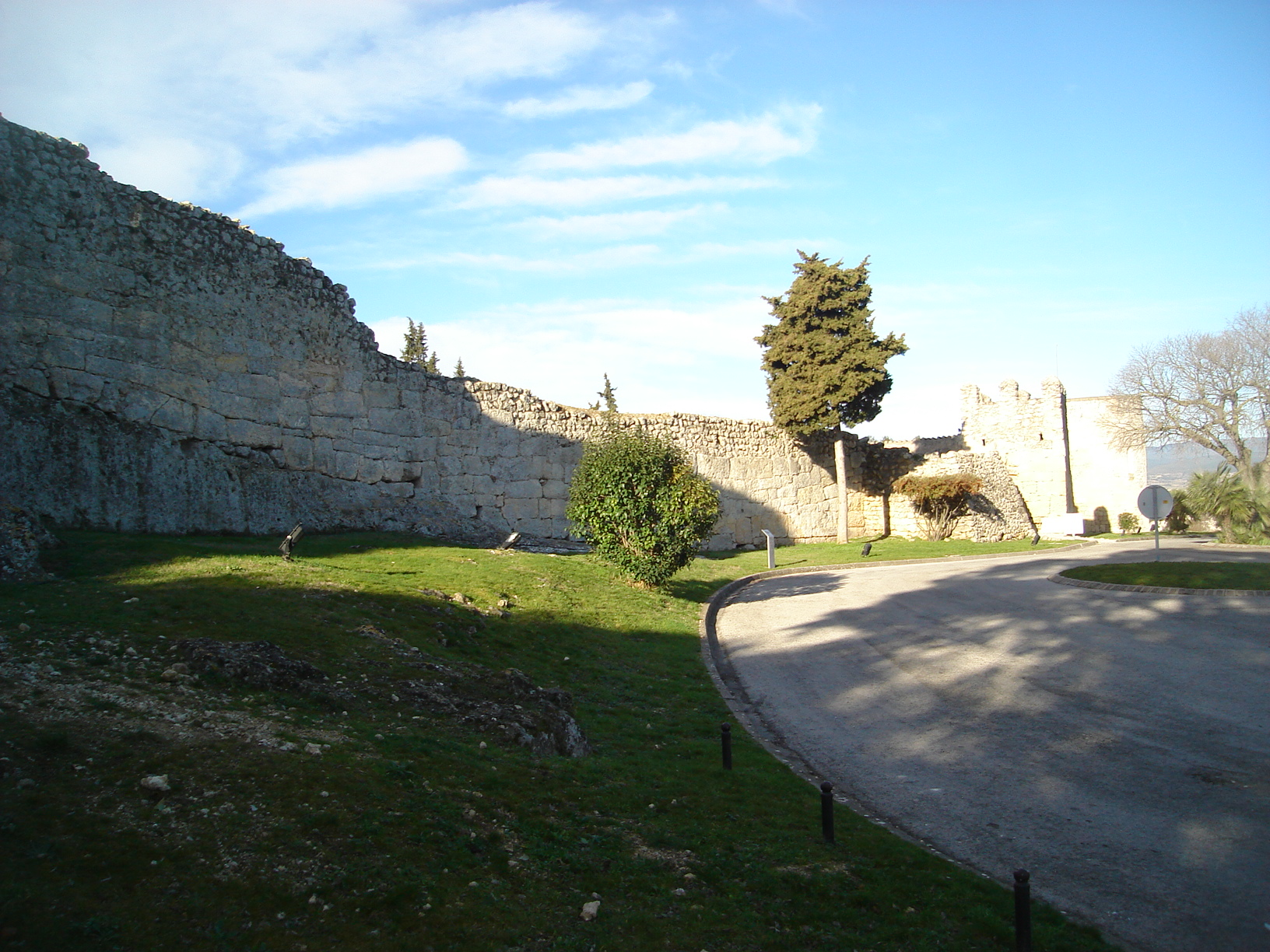
- Roman wall at Olèrdola

- Flag Coat of arms

- Location in Catalonia Olèrdola (Spain)
- Coordinates: 41°19′19″N 1°43′23″E
- Country: Spain
- Community: Catalonia
- Province: Barcelona
- Comarca: Alt Penedès

Government
  - Mayor: Josefina Mascaró (ERC) 2023

Area
  - Total: 30.2 km^{2} (11.7 sq mi)
- Elevation: 189 m (620 ft)

Population (2025-01-01)
  - Total: 3,945
  - Density: 131/km^{2} (338/sq mi)
- Demonym(s): Olerdolenc, olerdolenca Mogenc, mogenca Molantenc, molantenca
- Website: www.olerdola.cat

Olèrdola (Catalan pronunciation: [uˈlɛɾðulə]) is a municipality in the comarca of the Alt Penedès in Catalonia, Spain. It is situated on the northern side of the Garraf massif, and the highest point of the municipality is the Puig de l'Àliga at 468 m.

Olèrdola castle controlled the area of the Penedès Depression in the Early Middle Ages, reaching the height of its significance when its castle dominated the region under the control of the rebellious Mir Geribert, "Prince of Olèrdola". Its importance declined from the twelfth century and its administrative role was taken by Vilafranca del Penedès. The territory has been inhabited since the Neolithic period, and Iberic and Roman remains are juxtaposed with the ruins of the castle. The unusual, circular, Roman chapel of the Sant Sepulcre is near La Plana Rodona.

== Subdivisions ==
The name of the municipality is derived from the historical castle, not from any modern settlement. Six villages and two industrial zones (polígons industrials) make up the municipality. Populations are given as of 2005:

- Can Trabal (301)
- Daltmar (353)
- Moja (1285)
- El Polígon Industrial de Sant Pere Molanta (12)
- El Polígon Industrial el Clot de Moja
- Sant Miquel d'Olèrdola (327)
- Sant Pere Molanta (552), in the north of the municipality
- Viladellops (34)

== Demography ==
1900	1930	1950	1970	1986	2007
1438	1521	1234	1564	1578	3280
