= Garraf (Sitges) =

- Village
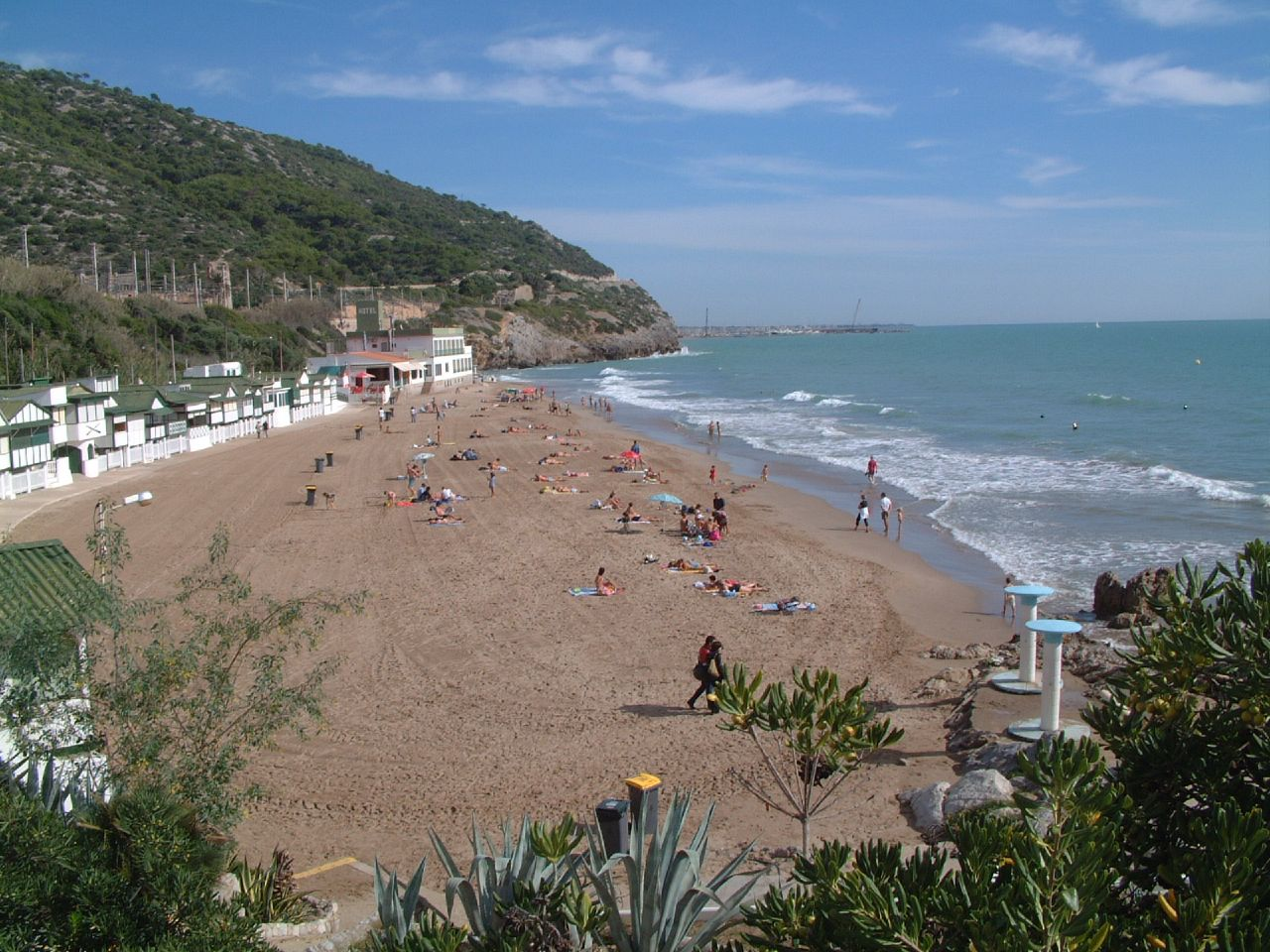
- Garraf beach

- Location of Garraf within Catalonia
- Coordinates: 41°15′10″N 1°54′06″E
- Country: Spain
- Autonomous community: Catalonia
- Province: Barcelona
- Comarca: Garraf
- Judicial district: Vilanova i la Geltrú
- Elevation: 10 m (33 ft)

Population (2014)
  - Total: 335
- Time zone: UTC+1 (CET)
  - Summer (DST): UTC+2 (CEST)
- Postal code: 08871
- Dialing code: 93
- Official languages: Catalan; Spanish
- Website: Official website

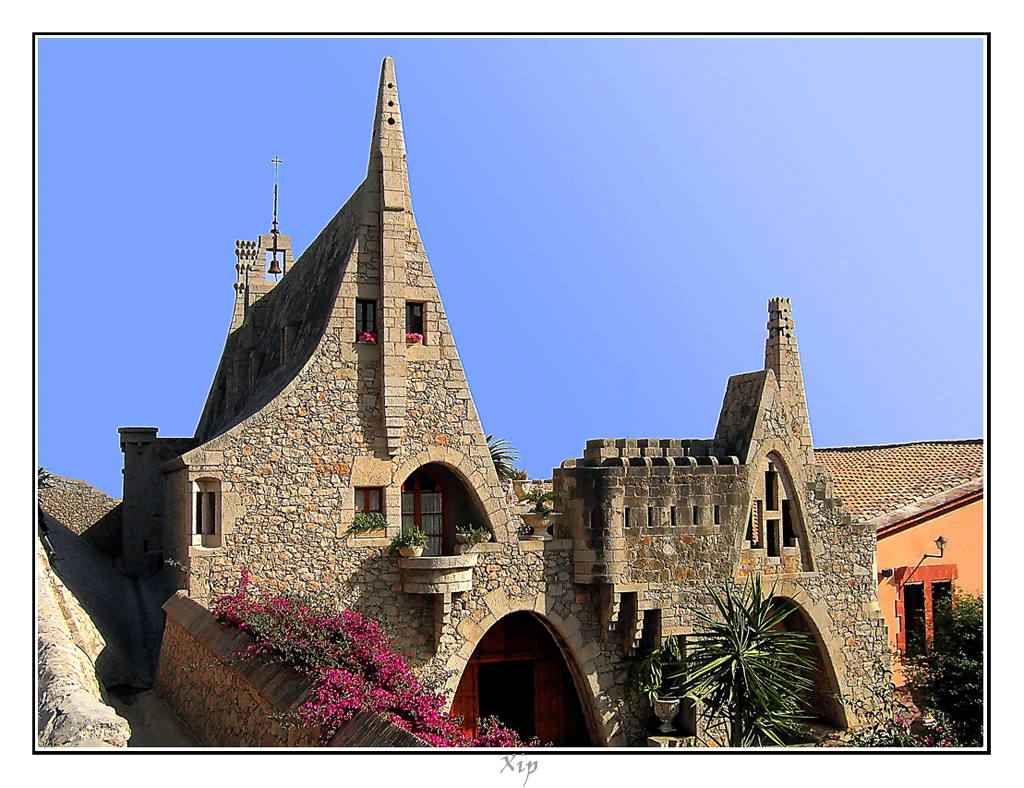
Celler Güell house view. Garraf

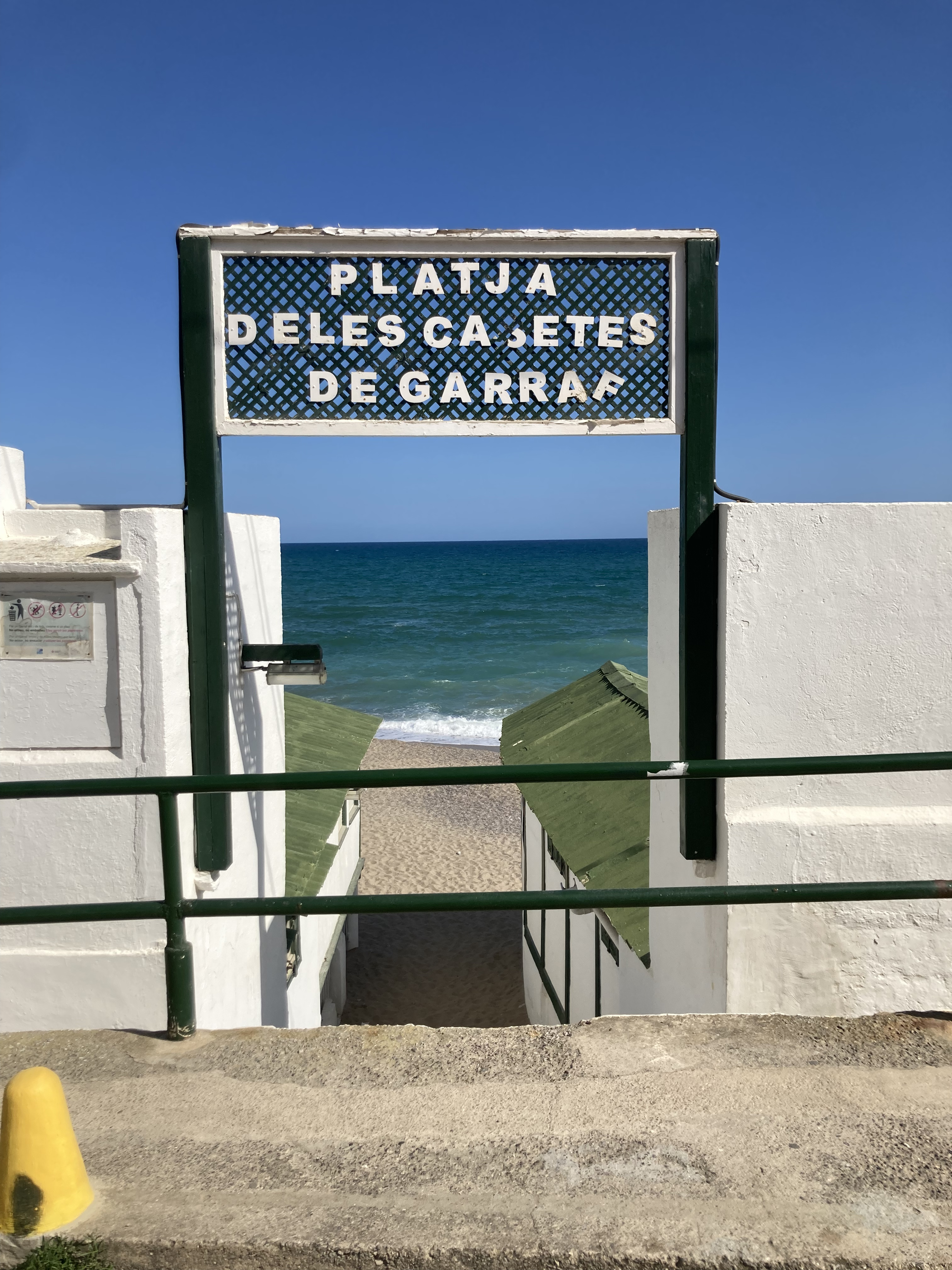
Beach Entrance

Garraf (Catalan pronunciation: [ɡəˈraf]) is a small seaside village located between Sitges and Castelldefels, in the Garraf comarca, Catalonia, Spain, surrounded by the area of the Garraf Natural Park.

== Description ==
Administratively Garraf belongs to the Sitges municipality. It was formerly a small fishing settlement, but has grown to become a holiday resort and its beach is full in the summertime. It also has a small Renfe railway station.

Garraf has a sports marina (Port del Garraf) which was originally built in 1902 as a harbor for freighters loading stone from the nearby limestone quarries.

Garraf has a small whitewashed church dedicated to the Virgin Mary. There is a house known as Celler Güell (Guell Winery) that was built by Antoni Gaudí. Presently it houses the premises of a restaurant.

Garraf village is located at the foot of the Garraf Massif, but the quarries nearby can mean a lot of dust is blown about on windy days in the fall and in the winter.

== Transportation ==
- Carretera C-31 (Les Costes del Garraf)
- RENFE-Estació de Garraf
