= Plaça de la República, Barcelona =

Square in Barcelona, Spain

Coordinates: 41.438347°N 2.174616°E

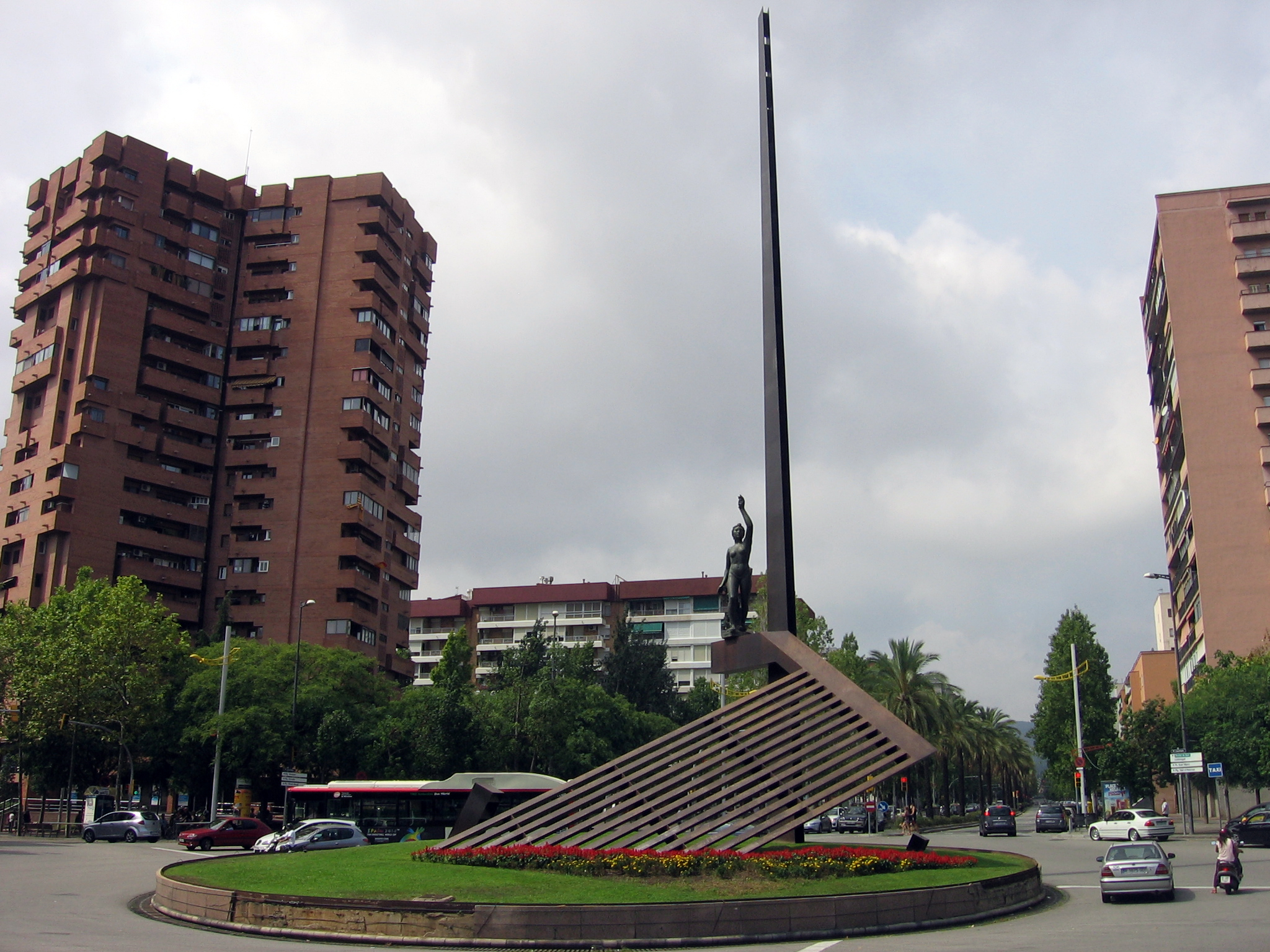
Plaça de la República - the Pi i Margall monument

Plaça de la República (in Catalan, meaning in English: Republic Square), previously called "Plaça de Llucmajor" is a square in Barcelona, unofficially regarded as the nucleus of its Nou Barris district. It's the intersection of three avenues: Passeig de Valldaura, Passeig de Verdum and Via Júlia. Besides, it's the official border between four neighbourhoods of the district: La Guineueta, La Prosperitat, Porta and Verdum.

Being scarcely more than a roundabout, its center is occupied since 1990 by a 30-metre high metal monument made by Josep Viladomat in the 1930s called La República, with the effigy of Francesc Pi i Margall. The monument was originally located in the much more famous intersection between Passeig de Gràcia and Avinguda Diagonal, which is nowadays still crowned by a Francoist monument.

The November 29, 2015 the City Council announced the upcoming change of name of the square, which will be renamed "Plaça de la República". The change will be effective on April 14, 2016.

== See also ==
- List of streets and squares in Nou Barris, Barcelona
- Urban planning of Barcelona
