= Porta, Barcelona =

Neighborhood in Nou Barris, Barcelona, Spain

Coordinates: 41°26′4.74″N 2°10′29.81″E

Porta
- Neighborhood of Barcelona
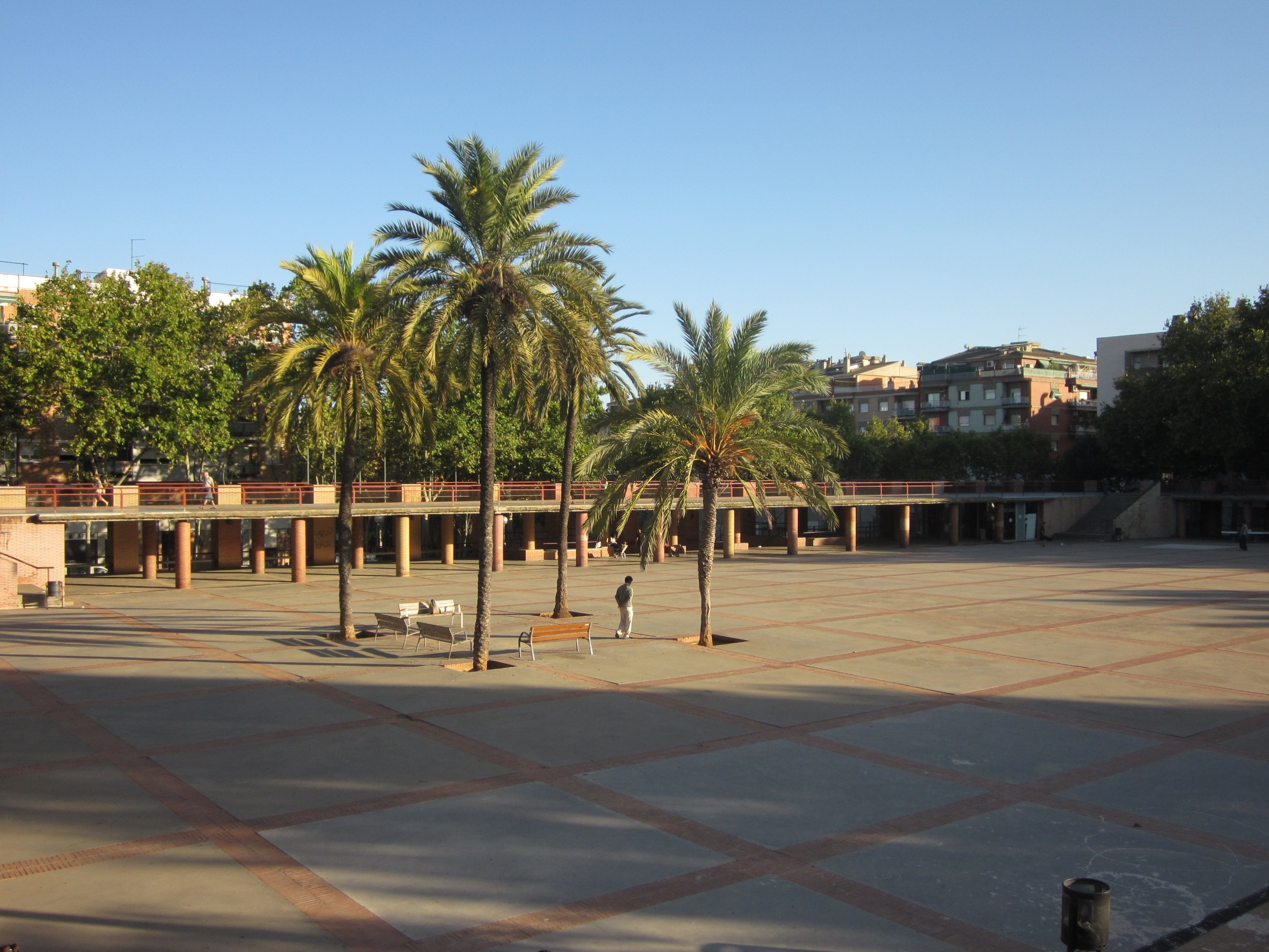
- Plaça Sóller
- Interactive map of Porta
- Country: Spain
- Autonomous community: Catalonia
- Province: Barcelona
- Comarca: Barcelonès
- Municipality: Barcelona
- District: Nou Barris

Area
  - Total: 0.841 km^{2} (0.325 sq mi)

Population
  - Total: 24,567
  - Density: 29,200/km^{2} (75,700/sq mi)

Porta (Catalan pronunciation: [ˈpɔrtə]) is a neighborhood in the Nou Barris district of Barcelona, Catalonia (Spain).

== Demographics ==
As of 30 June 2010, the Porta neighbourhood had a population of 23,809, with a population density of 28,344 inhabitants per km². The demographic profile of the population, based on data from the municipal register as of 30 June 2010, was as follows:

=== Population by sex ===
- Men: 11,177 (46.9%)
- Women: 12,632 (53.1%)

=== Population by age ===
- Children (0–14 years): 11.4%
- Young people (15–24 years): 8.1%
- Adults (25–64 years): 55.1%
- Older people (65 years and over): 25.3%

=== Population by place of birth ===
- Barcelona: 47.2%
- Rest of Catalonia: 5.5%
- Rest of Spain: 30.0%
- Foreign countries: 17.3%

== Places of interest ==
=== Can Valent ===
Can Valent (also known as Can Pere Valent) is one of two surviving farmhouses in the neighborhood, the other being nearby Can Verdaguer. Located between Avinguda de Rio de Janeiro and Carrer del Pintor Alsamora, near the Barcelona cemetery and Heron City shopping centre, it is listed in Barcelona's architectural heritage catalogue. The building, which has an asymmetric basilica-like layout, dates from around the 16th or 17th century. It is currently unused and partly in ruins.

=== Plaça de Sóller ===
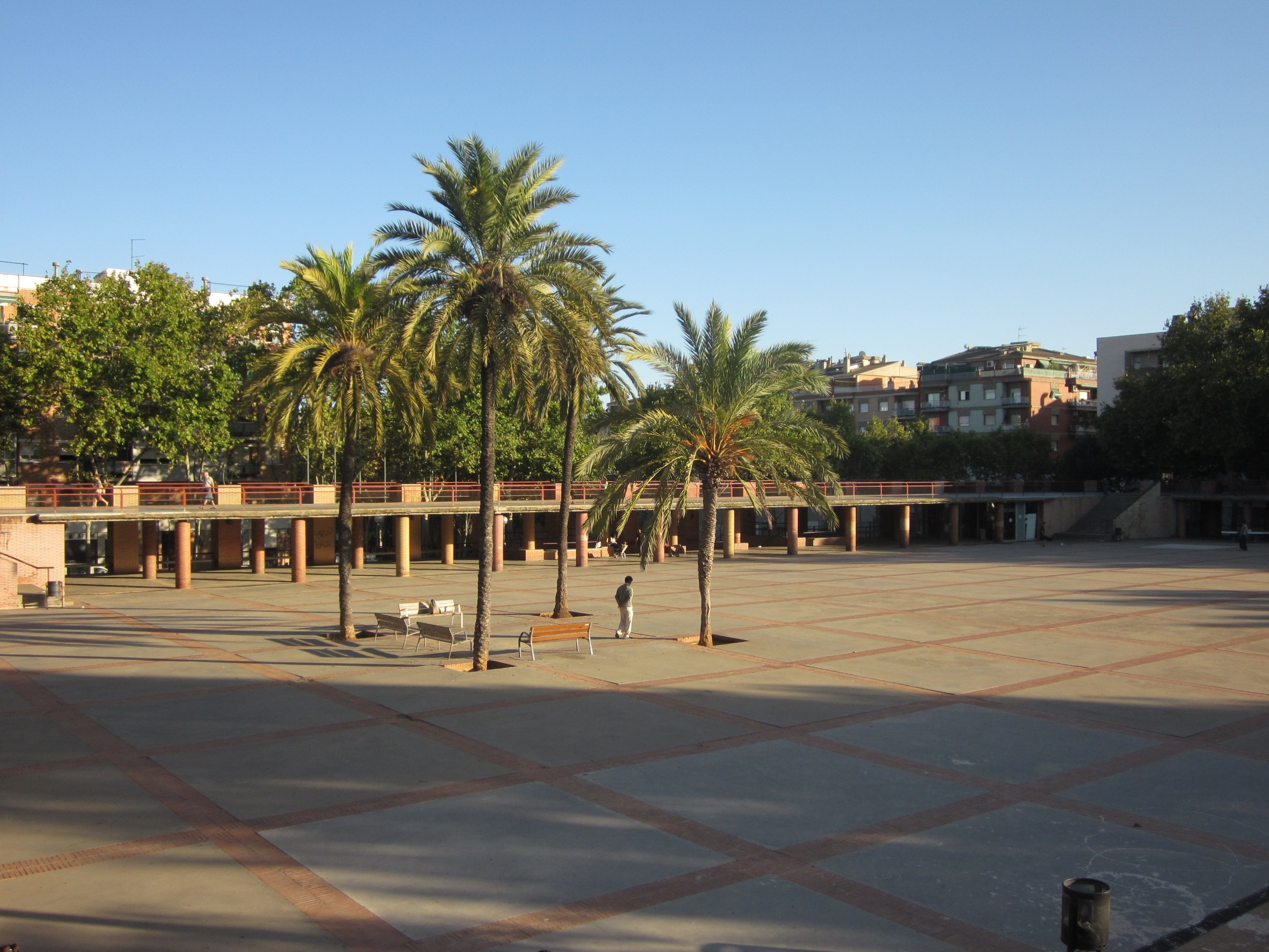
Plaza de Sóller

Plaça de Sóller is one of the largest squares in Barcelona. Located in the center of the neighborhood, it was opened in 1983 after a long campaign by residents to preserve the site from property development.

Because of the slope of the land, the square is divided into two levels. The upper level is a park with trees, benches, gardens and children's play areas. The lower level is a large paved area of more than 4,000 m², often used for large neighborhood events, including concerts during local festivals. A pond separates the two levels and features the marble sculpture Homenatge a la Mediterrània by Xavier Corberó.

The square is surrounded by a brick wall, which forms a portico along the lower level. The Porta Sóller civic centre is located beneath it.

=== Can Dragó Park ===
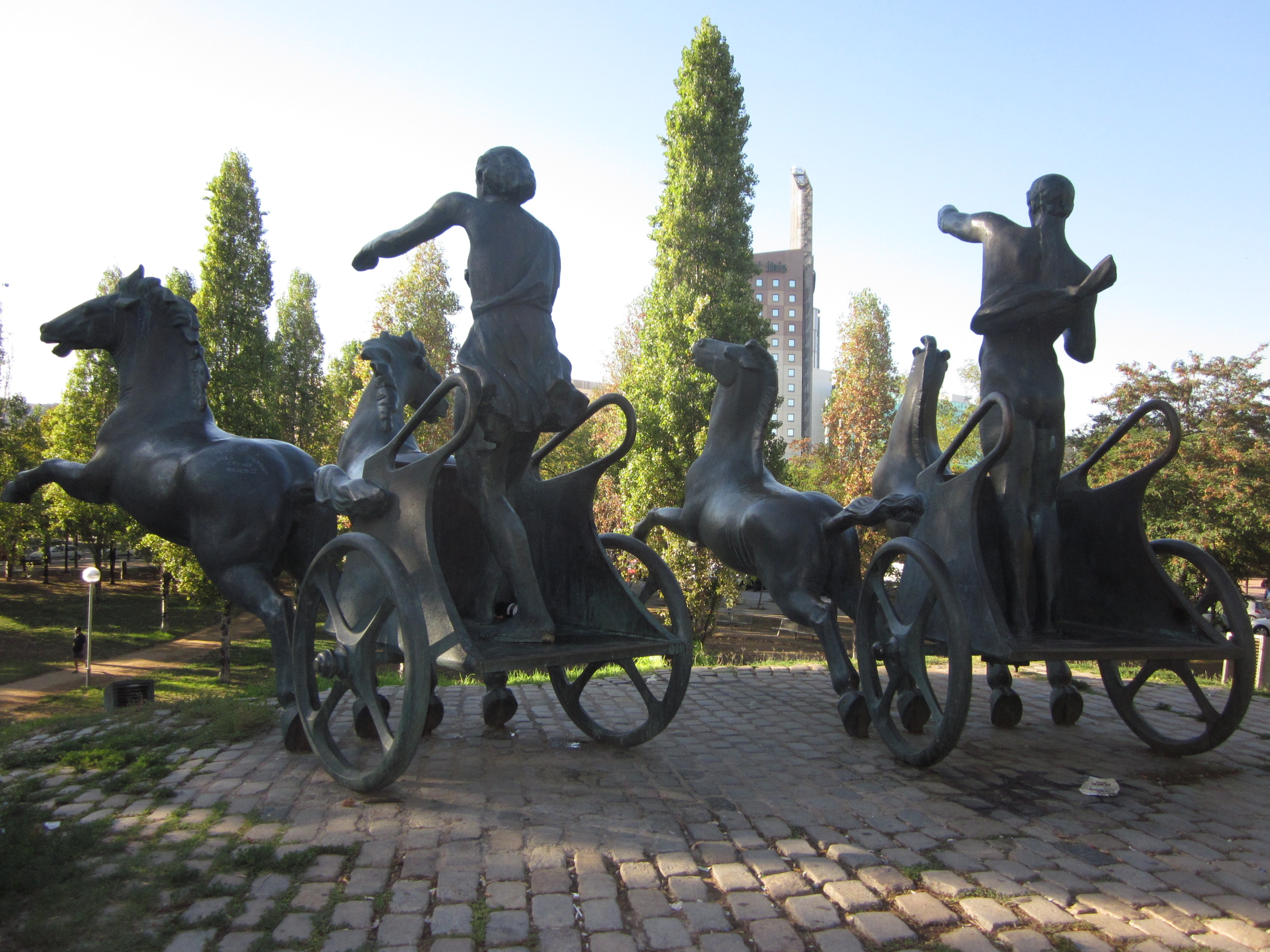
Olympic Charioteers sculpture in Can Dragó park.

Can Dragó Park runs parallel to Avinguda Meridiana for about 1 km. Covering 12 hectares, it is the main green space in Porta and includes a large sports complex. The park contains two notable sculptures: a monument to victims of terrorism by Sol LeWitt and a replica of the Aurigas Olímpicas at the Montjuïc Olympic Stadium, created by Pablo Gargallo.

=== Sant Andreu Cemetery ===
Sant Andreu Cemetery was built by the former independent municipality of Sant Andreu de Palomar and consecrated in 1839. It was expanded and renovated several times before reaching its present boundaries. Its main entrance, built in 1927, is on Carrer dels Garrofers.

The oldest section contains several Neoclassical and Modernista tombs, as well as Jewish graves. An octagonal chapel inspired by Byzantine architecture was built in 1913. The northern section was built in the 1940s and contains the Panteón del Soldado, where several soldiers of the Nationalist faction who died during the Spanish Civil War are buried. Falangist symbols on the monument were removed in 2010. The cemetery is listed in Barcelona's architectural heritage catalogue.

=== El Principito Gardens ===
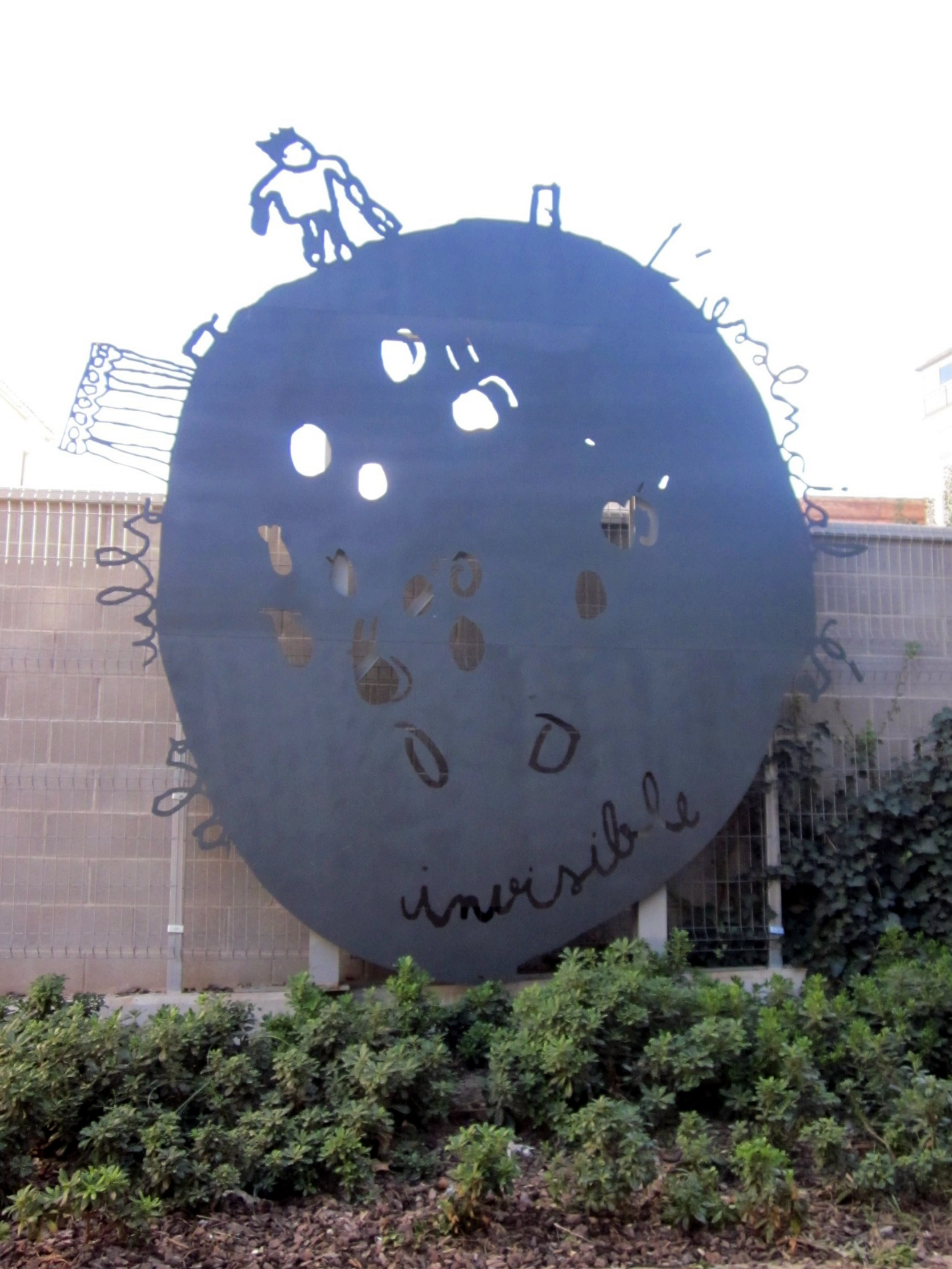
Monument to The Little Prince.

The El Principito Gardens (Catalan: Jardins del Petit Príncep) are located between Carrer d'Alella, Carrer de Santañí, and Carrer d'Alloza. They opened on 19 June 2010 after the redevelopment of the site.

The 2,352 m² gardens contain a children's play area, a garden and a rest area. A 3.40-by-2.90-metre Corten steel sculpture depicts the Little Prince, the character created by Antoine de Saint-Exupéry. The design was based on a drawing by a pupil at the nearby Aloma primary school. The sculpture bears the phrase L'essencial és invisible als ulls ("What is essential is invisible to the eye").

=== Plaça de la República and Monument to the Republic ===
At the northwestern edge of Porta, bordering the neighborhoods of La Prosperitat, El Turó de la Peira and La Guineueta, is Plaça de la República. It is an important meeting point in Nou Barris, where three major roads meet: Via Júlia, Passeig de Valldaura, and Passeig de Verdum.

At the center is the Monument to Pi i Margall and the Republic, a group of sculptures created in 1934. One is La República, a bronze sculpture by Josep Viladomat depicting a nude woman holding a laurel branch. The other is a white marble medallion by Joan Pie depicting Francisco Pi y Margall, president of the First Spanish Republic.

Both works originally formed part of the Cinc d'Oros obelisk in Plaça del Cinc d'Oros. They were removed by the Francoist authorities after the Spanish Civil War. In 1990, they were restored and installed in Plaça de la República as part of a Corten steel structure designed by architects Albert Viaplana and Helio Piñón, which represents a staircase and a 30-metre-high flagpole.
