= Verdum =

Neighbourhood in Barcelona, Spain

Coordinates: 41°26′33.40″N 2°10′31.44″E

- Neighborhood of Barcelona
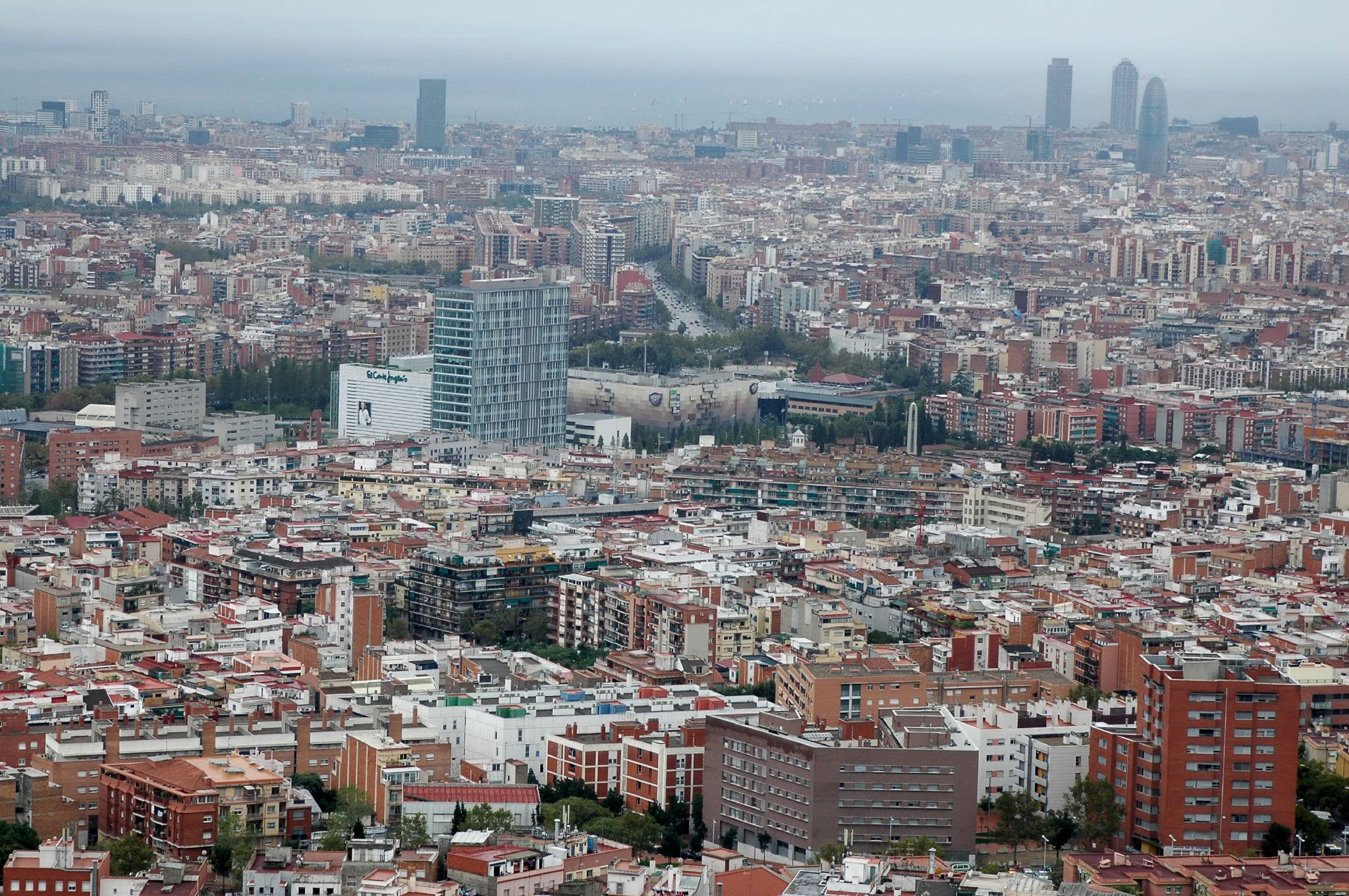
- Verdum (in the foreground) as seen from the Carretera Alta de Roquetes
- Interactive map of Verdum
- Country: Spain
- Autonomous community: Catalonia
- Province: Barcelona
- Comarca: Barcelonès
- Municipality: Barcelona
- District: Nou Barris

Area
  - Total: 0.273 km^{2} (0.105 sq mi)

Population
  - Total: 12,261
  - Density: 44,900/km^{2} (116,000/sq mi)
- Demonym(s): verdumenc, -a

Verdum (Catalan pronunciation: [bərˈdum], Verdún in Castilian) is a neighbourhood in the Nou Barris district of Barcelona. Verdún is a neighborhood in the central part of the Nou Barris district of Barcelona. It is surrounded by the neighborhoods of Les Roquetes, La Guineueta, and La Prosperitat. The neighborhood is a fully urbanized triangle consisting of two major housing developments: the so-called Governor's Housing, built between 1952 and 1955, and a housing estate developed by the Obra Sindical del Hogar, which was also responsible for housing in the Trinitat Nova neighborhood.

== Name ==
The neighborhood takes its name from the French town of Verdun, after a street in the neighborhood was named in 1919 in memory of the Battle of Verdun, which had taken place there. The name of the street was later adopted as the name of the neighborhood.

== Geography ==
Verdún is a triangular area covering 0.23 km^{2} (0.089 sq mi). It is bounded by Via Favència, which forms the border with Les Roquetes, Via Júlia, which borders La Prosperitat, and Carrer de l'Artesania, which follows the course of the former Canyelles stream and forms the border with La Guineueta.
