= 1931 Barcelona rent strike =

Rent strike

- Arrested CNT-affiliated strikers being funneled through a street in Barcelona, September 1931
- Date: July – December 1931; Intermittent, small-scale strikes throughout 1932
- Location: Barcelona, L'Hospitalet de Llobregat, Santa Coloma de Gramenet
- Result: Strike violently suppressed Some reductions in rents achieved

Parties
Confederación Nacional del Trabajo; Committee for Economic Defense; Local neighborhood organizations and support networks	Spanish government; Government of Barcelona; Chamber of Property; Housing Board; Security and Assault Corps

Casualties
- Deaths: 18

The 1931 Barcelona rent strike was called in July 1931 by Confederación Nacional del Trabajo (CNT) as a result of a massive immigration wave to Barcelona for jobs constructing the 1929 International Exposition, the Wall Street crash of 1929, and political instability. By the following month, 100,000 working-class families had joined it. The strike went on for several months, during which it overlapped with the Strike of the Telefónica and the general strike called by the CNT in September, and had its epicentre in the so-called Casas Baratas (Cheap Houses) in the neighbourhoods of Bon Pastor, Can Peguera, Ferrer i Guardia and Baró de Viver. The strike was fiercely suppressed, with 18 deaths and dozens of injuries and arrests. It ended in December of the same year after the imprisonment of the CNT-created committee, although it remained active intermittently during the following year, giving rise to various agreements with small owners for a reduction in rent prices.

== Events ==
=== Background ===
The preparations for the 1929 International Exposition led to a series of large-scale works in Barcelona, such as the construction of the metro and the urbanisation of Montjuïc. This attracted hundreds of thousands of workers from all over Spain, and led to the city's population increasing from 600,000 to over a million in the 1930s. However, no housing plan was prepared to accommodate this new population, which caused rent prices to skyrocket. At the end of the First World War, social housing projects started in much of Europe, but in Barcelona the city's bourgeoisie prevented a similar plan for the city. This led to many of the city's new workers having to live in self-built slums. Some of them later were relocated to the privately owned Casas Baratas (low cost housing addressed to the working and lower middle class) in the Bon Pastor, Can Peguera, Ferrer i Guardia and Barón de Viver neighbourhoods. Meanwhile, the financial crisis of 1929 reached Europe, and the job offer was insufficient for the number of new residents, many of whom also lost their jobs as the crisis grew and the construction works were finished.

With the end of the Exposition, the situation deteriorated even further, with a sharp increase in unemployment and famine, at a time when the only public benefit was aid for the destitute. Faced with this situation, the construction section of the CNT created the Committee for Economic Defense, with which they intended to reach an agreement with the Chamber of Property and the City Council to reduce the price of rents. Among its other demands were the non-execution of the evictions announced by the Housing Board and actions to address unemployment and the rise in food prices. Despite the demonstrations, the Committee did not achieve any institutional response, since the Chamber was strongly opposed to its demands, having the support of the Government.

=== Rent strike ===
The Committee for Economic Defense then decided to call all tenants who wanted to go on a rent strike to their headquarters at 26 Mercaders Street. Among the demands they agreed on was a 40% reduction in rent, that those who had no income should not have to pay rent while they were in that situation and that all unemployed people should be relocated to where there was work. The strike was called on 5 July, and by August it was already being supported by 100,000 families, especially from the Casas Baratas neighbourhoods. The start of the strike was followed by a huge wave of evictions, forcing the workers to create a resistance fund to meet the payments of people without income. Strategies were also developed to make evictions more difficult, such as bringing furniture back into the house with the help of neighbours as soon as it began to be taken down to the street by the evictors. The neighbourhood organisation of Ferrer i Guardia was particularly strong, led by women such as Victoria Ruiz Rodríguez and Dolores Maldonado Ruiz, who managed to stop evictions, find alternative housing and create neighbourhood support networks despite the harsh response of the Chamber of Property and the Housing Board.

=== Repression and aftermath ===
In August 1931, coinciding with the expansion of the strike, the government's response was toughened and the republican Guardia de Asalto was sent to Barcelona. The repression of the demonstrations became more severe and the police charges against protesters increased, despite the strategy of the strikers' sectors of putting pregnant women in the front row of the demonstrations. Evictions began to be carried out in a more violent manner, with furniture being thrown out of windows, and the entire Committee for Economic Defense was imprisoned. The demonstrations resulted in 18 deaths and dozens of injuries and arrests. The committee was imprisoned at the end of 1931 but an agreement on the reduction of rents was reached in January 1932 with small property owners, after which the strike was mostly over. However, the strike continued on a smaller scale in different areas throughout 1932 and new negotiations with owners took place, continuing intermittently during the years of the Second Spanish Republic, and rent-related demands were active in the city until 1942. The Casas Baratas of the Ferrer i Guardia neighbourhood continued being an active centre of mobilisation during the years following the strike and during the social revolution of 1936.

== Legacy ==
In 2019, Manel Aisa Pàmpols published a monograph on the strike, entitled La huelga de alquileres y el comité de defensa económica (The Rent Strike and the Committee for Economic Defense). In 2023 it was adapted into a comic book format as Rebel·lió: La vaga de lloguers del 1931 (Rebellion: The rent strike of 1931), in an edition by the City Council of Barcelona. In March 2023, the City Council inaugurated a memorial lectern in the former Casas Baratas in the Marina del Prat Vermell (which contains the former Ferrer i Guardia neighbourhood) and in the Francesc Candel Library in memory of the strike.

Other rent strikes have occurred in countries such as Chile, Mexico, Argentina, the United States and Canada, although they did not reach the scale of the one in Barcelona. In Spain, in 2020, there was another rent strike called by tenants' unions in the context of the COVID-19 pandemic. In 2024, in the context of protests over the housing crisis, tenants' unions have called for a new rent strike.

== See also ==
- Tenants' strike of 1907 in Argentina
