= Can Peguera =

Neighborhood in Barcelona, Catalonia, Spain

Coordinates: 41°26′06″N 2°09′58″E

- Neighborhood of Barcelona
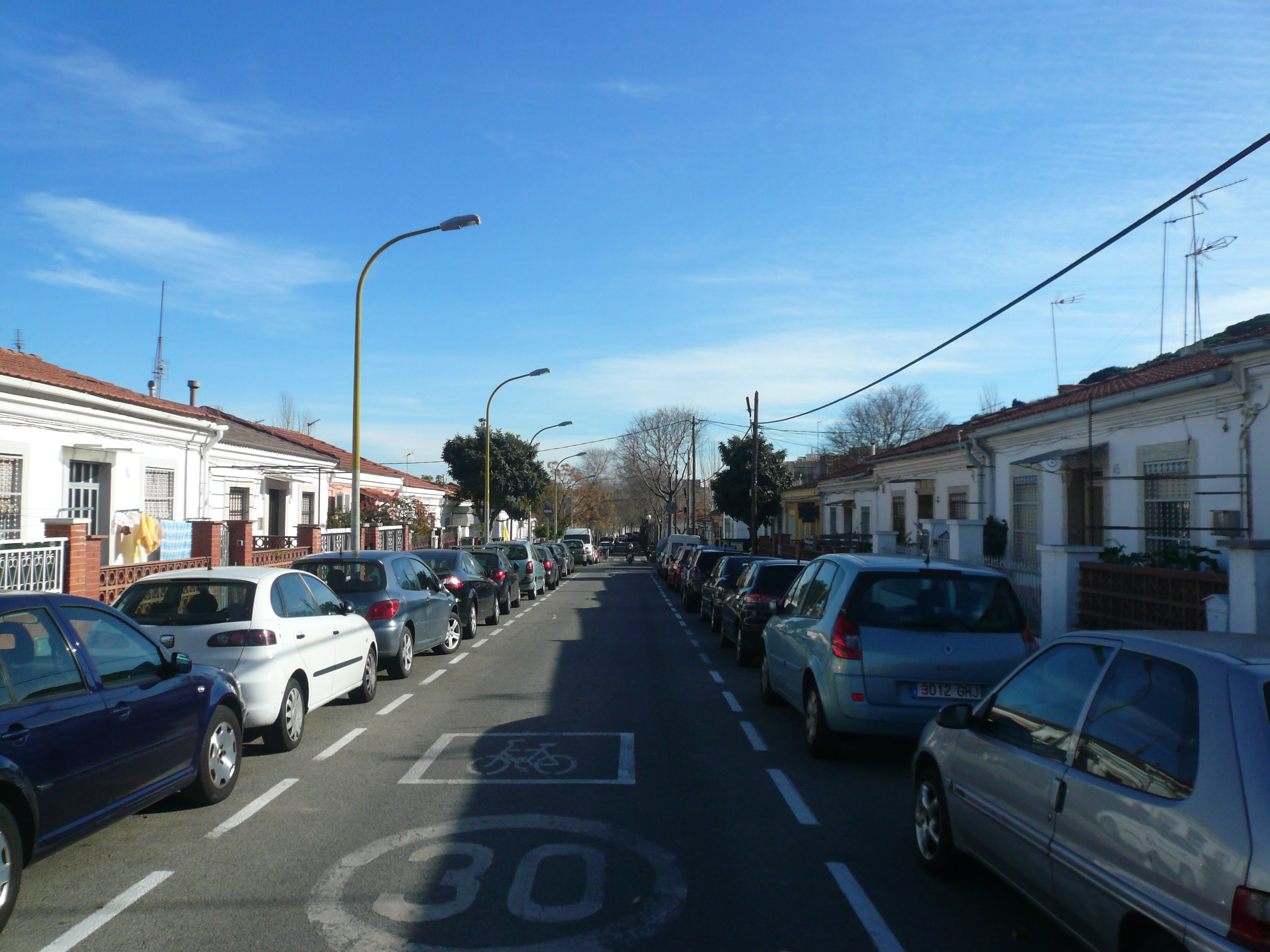
- Cases Barrates of Can Peguera
- Interactive map of Can Peguera
- Country: Spain
- Autonomous community: Catalonia
- Province: Barcelona
- Comarca: Barcelonès
- Municipality: Barcelona
- District: Nou Barris

Area
  - Total: 0.12 km^{2} (0.046 sq mi)

Population
  - Total: 2,216
  - Density: 18,000/km^{2} (48,000/sq mi)

Can Peguera (Catalan pronunciation: [ˈkam pəˈɣeɾə], Spanish pronunciation: [ˈkam peˈɣeɾa]) is a neighborhood in the Nou Barris district of Barcelona, Catalonia (Spain).

Developed in the early 20th century, it was originally established to provide affordable housing for workers, featuring single-storey houses known as "cases barates" (cheap houses). These structures were built on land that once belonged to the Can Peguera farmhouse, giving the neighborhood its name.

The neighborhood's borders La Guineueta and Turó de la Peira.

== Landmarks ==
- Parroquia De San Francisco Javier, a local parish
