= Sustainable architecture in Barcelona =

Sustainable architecture is a type of architecture with the goal of limiting the environmental impact of a building when compared to regular architecture. Sustainable architecture has become a crucial aspect of modern urban development, with Barcelona at the forefront of this movement. Barcelona, a city already known for its unique architecture, has numerous innovative architectural projects combining cutting-edge design with eco-friendly technologies and materials. Famous architects such as Antoni Gaudí and Enric Ruiz-Geli have used sustainable techniques in their designs, causing Barcelona to be considered sustainably advanced. Barcelona is also working to expand green spaces, public transportation, and use more sustainable energy sources. From residential buildings to public spaces and cultural institutions, Barcelona's sustainable architecture has become a model for sustainable urban development for the rest of the world.

== Eco-designs of neighborhoods ==
Barcelona is focusing on the sustainable eco-design of neighborhoods. Recent construction in Vallbona, Barcelona has used strategies to reduce energy usage, water consumption, and waste. Some of the energy reduction strategy actions were passive saving measures, natural ventilation, district heating, and efficient architecture. The water conservation measures were separative sewer, rainwater collection, irrigation with local river sources, groundwater use, and greywater reuse. The waste management techniques increased the composting of organic waste and improved the waste collection methods at the street level. The city designers also created green spaces, promoted city mobility, and designed public spaces. The green and agricultural spaces include xero gardening, the preservation of biodiversity, and irrigated agriculture plots. The creation of city mobility options included a road network with 75% of the space dedicated to pedestrians, bicycle lanes, bus networks, and minimal parking spaces. Finally, public spaces were made to reduce noise, and serve people’s social needs. While ecodesign, like the construction in Vallbona, can help with environmental protection, it is crucial that there is a structured way to maintain and monitor environmental conservation.

=== Supermanzanas ===
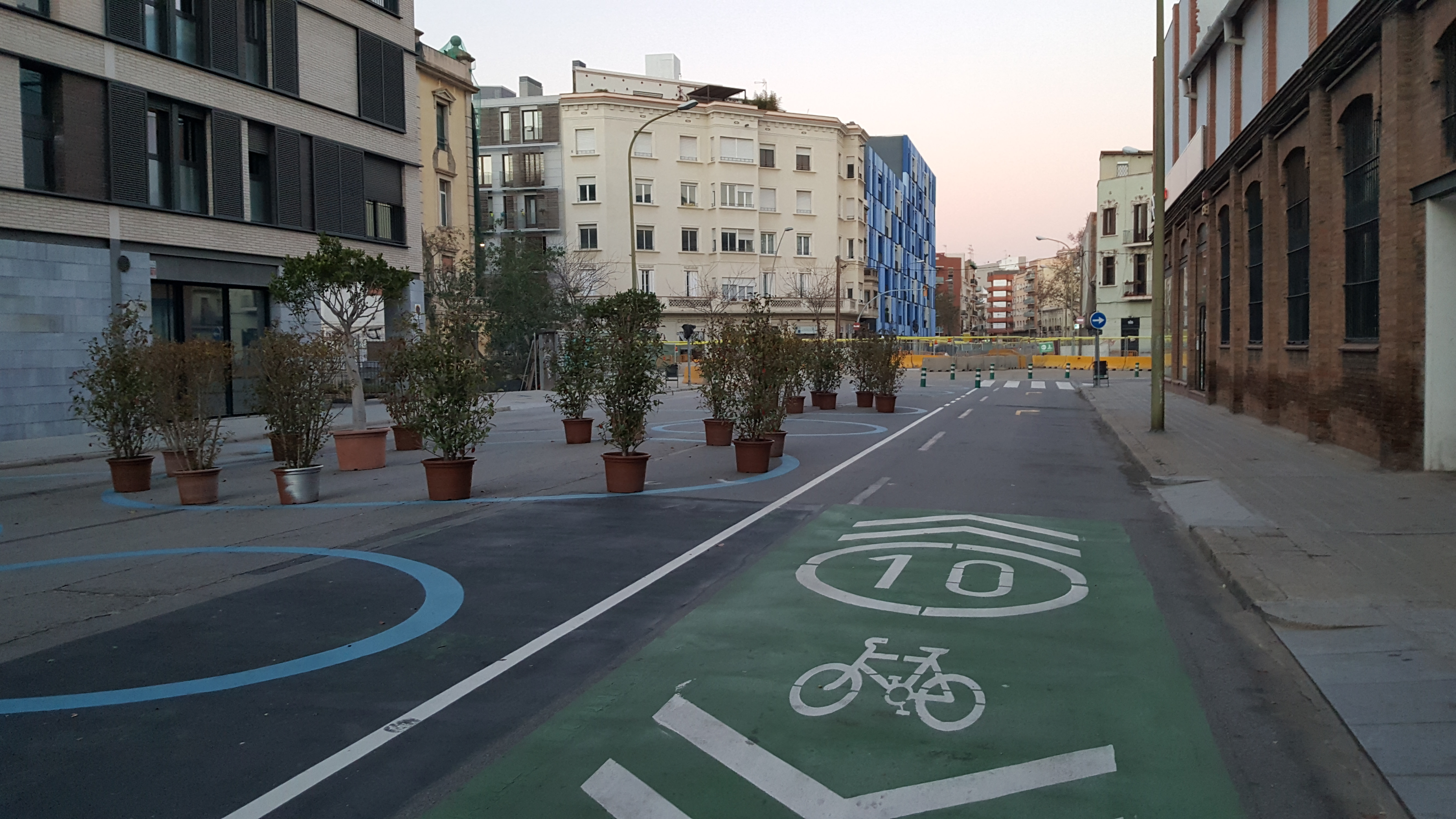
Supermanzana in Poblenou

Supermanzanas are a sustainable urban design concept that involves several blocks joined together to create a pedestrian-friendly zone that reduces traffic, noise, and pollution levels. This approach is being successfully implemented in Barcelona, with the most well-known example being the Poblenou Supermanzana. The superblocks in Barcelona are designed to prioritize pedestrians, cyclists, and social spaces, with cars being relegated to the periphery. By reducing the number of cars in the superblocks, air and noise pollution levels are lowered, making these areas more livable and healthier for residents. The Poblenou Supermanzana covers nine blocks and features green spaces, bike paths, and outdoor seating areas. This superblock has been credited with reducing traffic by 60%, noise levels by 7 decibels, and air pollution levels by 42%. Supermanzanas are an example of how sustainable architecture can be used to create more livable cities by prioritizing the needs of people over cars. By encouraging walking, biking, and social interaction, these superblocks can create healthier, more vibrant communities while reducing the negative impacts of car-centric urban design.

=== Green facades ===
Green facades are created by growing plants on the side of buildings. When building a green facade, the architects must select the correct structure, orientation, and depth cavity for the wall to allow for solar radiation to reach the walls. There are an increasing number of green facades being built in L’Eixample and other areas of Barcelona. These green facades have psychological, economic, environmental, and aesthetic benefits. The facades require minimal maintenance because they cannot break down. Green facades help to control the effects of heat islands. They reduce the energy consumption of buildings by helping to reduce the amount of heating and cooling required. Additionally, they reduce pollution in the environment and increase the biodiversity of Barcelona through adding further plant varieties.

== Sustainable buildings ==
=== The Blood and Tissues Bank of Catalonia ===
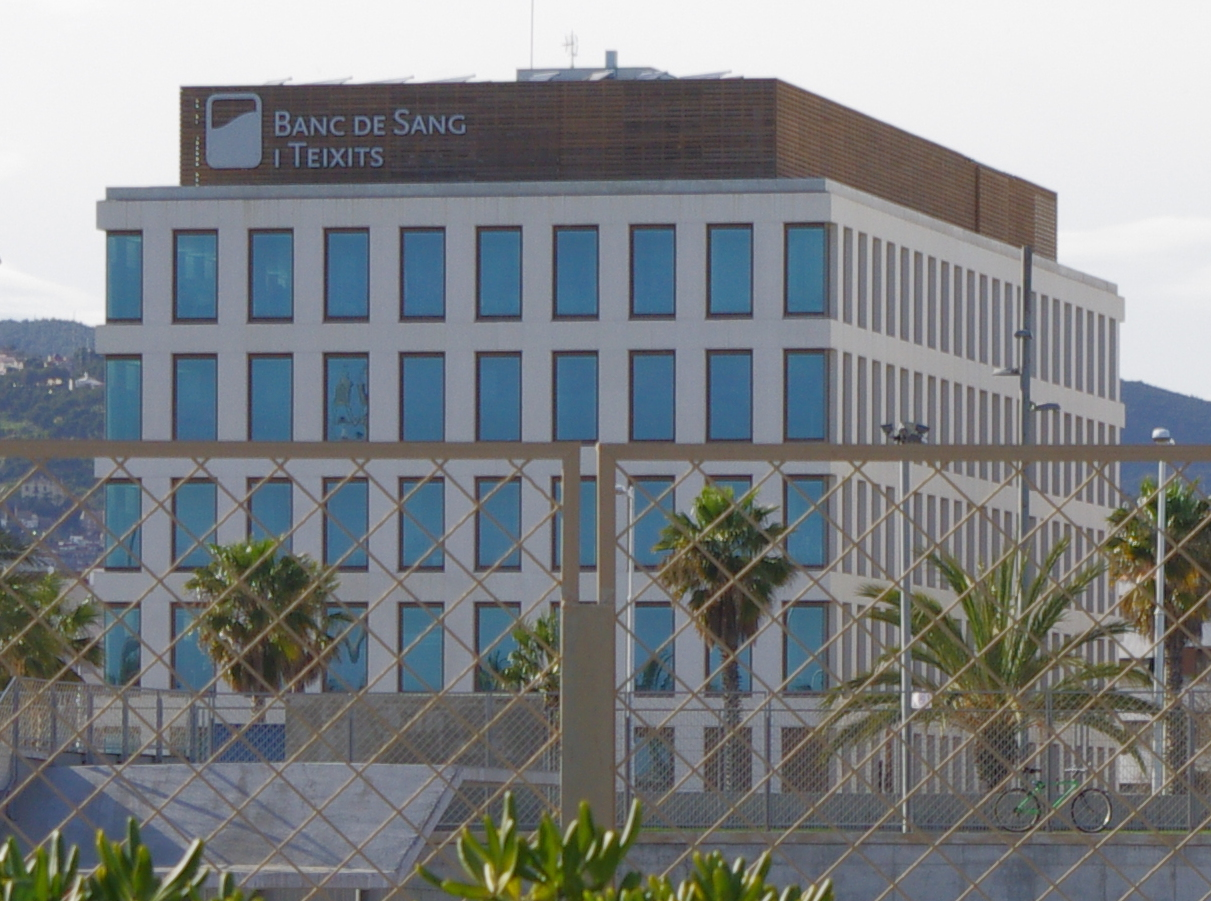
The Blood and Tissues Bank of Catalonia

The Blood and Tissues Bank of Catalonia is located in the technological district and its design emphasized energy efficiency. The building's climate control system uses free cooling air conditioners and heat exchanges. These reduce the thermal demand of the building, thus making it more sustainable. There is also a wall of facades which prevents the building from getting overheated. This building saves 72% of energy consumption with their efforts to be sustainable when compared to buildings that are used in a similar manner. Specifically, the building is said to save nearly 1.5 million kWh and 963 t (948 long tons; 1,062 short tons) in emissions of carbon dioxide annually. Not only is this building environmentally friendly, but it is also sustainable in an economic sense since this building saves over 250,000 euros per year.

=== Media-tic ===
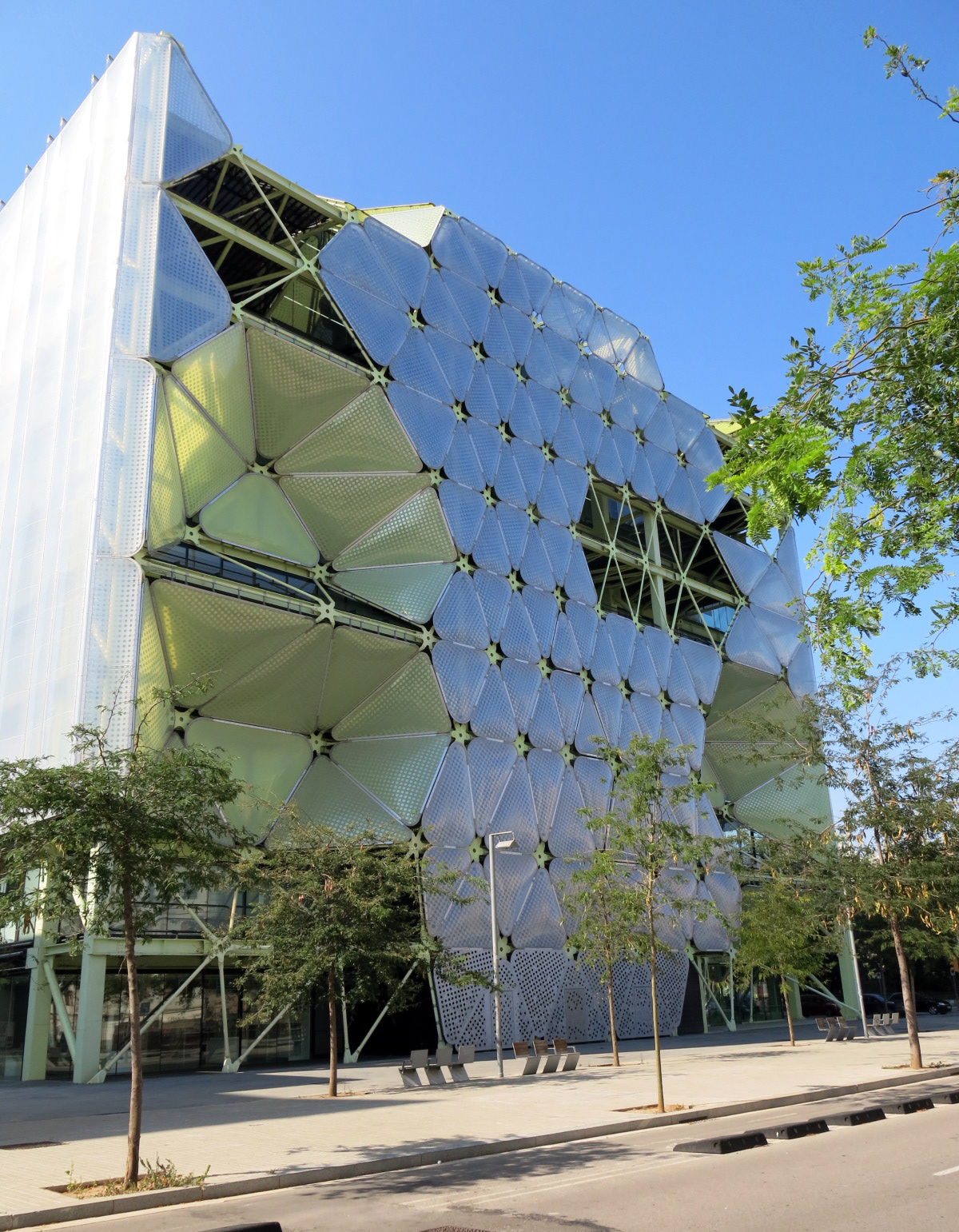
Media-tic

The Media-tic was made by Enric Ruiz-Geli, and the building relies solely on renewable energy for its operation. For climate regulation, the original facade has lux meters, which measure the illuminance in an area to optimize the light efficiency of the building. Teflon is used as a solar filter while the facade maximizes the solar light. This helps the building’s climate control and saves carbon dioxide emissions of the building by approximately 60%. Using this building as an example, it has been found that the cost of sustainable architecture is similar to the price of non-sustainable architecture, making it more appealing to build sustainably in the future.

=== Baró de Viver Civic Center ===
This building is the first sociocultural equipment in Spain to receive the LEED Platinum certificate. The LEED Platinum certificate is an award for sustainable buildings on the international level. This building is used to provide further green space to the community and social spaces, specifically for the elderly. The Baró de Viver Civic Center collects and filters rainwater with the plant cover in order to conserve water. It also has photovoltaic solar panels and a lot of natural light to limit use of unsustainable electricity. Regarding climate control and noise control, there is insulation to make the building more comfortable without having to use electricity.

== Antoni Gaudí ==
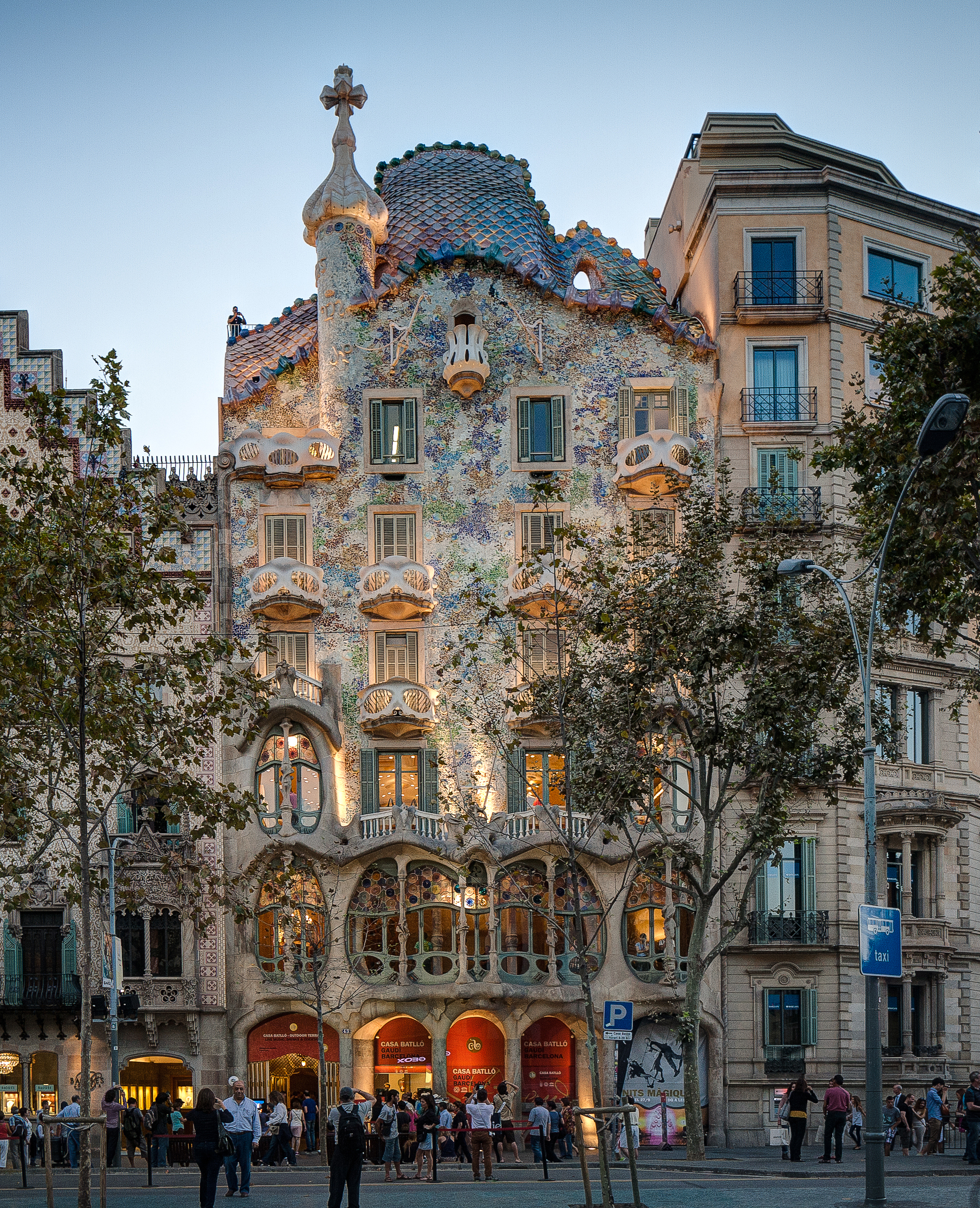
Casa Batlló

Famous Catalan architect Antoni Gaudí used many sustainable practices in his projects around Barcelona. His buildings were constructed to be energy efficient by being bioclimatic, as he designed buildings based on the local climate. He was also known to reuse building materials and ensuring there was no material wasted. This can be seen in one of his favorite styles called Trencadis, in which he takes already broken pieces of ceramic and repurposes them. Furthermore, one of his most famous projects, Casa Batlló, incorporates light and solar energy, creating an energy-efficient house.

== Barcelona Nature Plan 2030 ==
Barcelona is especially prone to the effects of climate change due to its geography and location, so the city is taking additional measures to attempt to combat these effects. Barcelona has created a plan called “Barcelona Nature Plan 2030.” This plan's goal is to increase the amount of greenery present in Barcelona as well as promote the connectivity of green spaces to make them more effective. A concern regarding these improvements is green gentrification, but Barcelona is attempting to keep this to a minimum. The fact that Barcelona is an extremely dense city increases the need for green infrastructure throughout the city.

The goal of the Barcelona Nature Plan 2030 is to add a total of 160 new areas of green spaces. In addition to combatting the climate crisis, this additional green infrastructure aims to improve the wellbeing of the citizens of Barcelona. The city plans to seek community member input regarding plan for the green spaces in order to ensure the spaces will be used and accepted by the community.

== Public transportation and sustainability ==
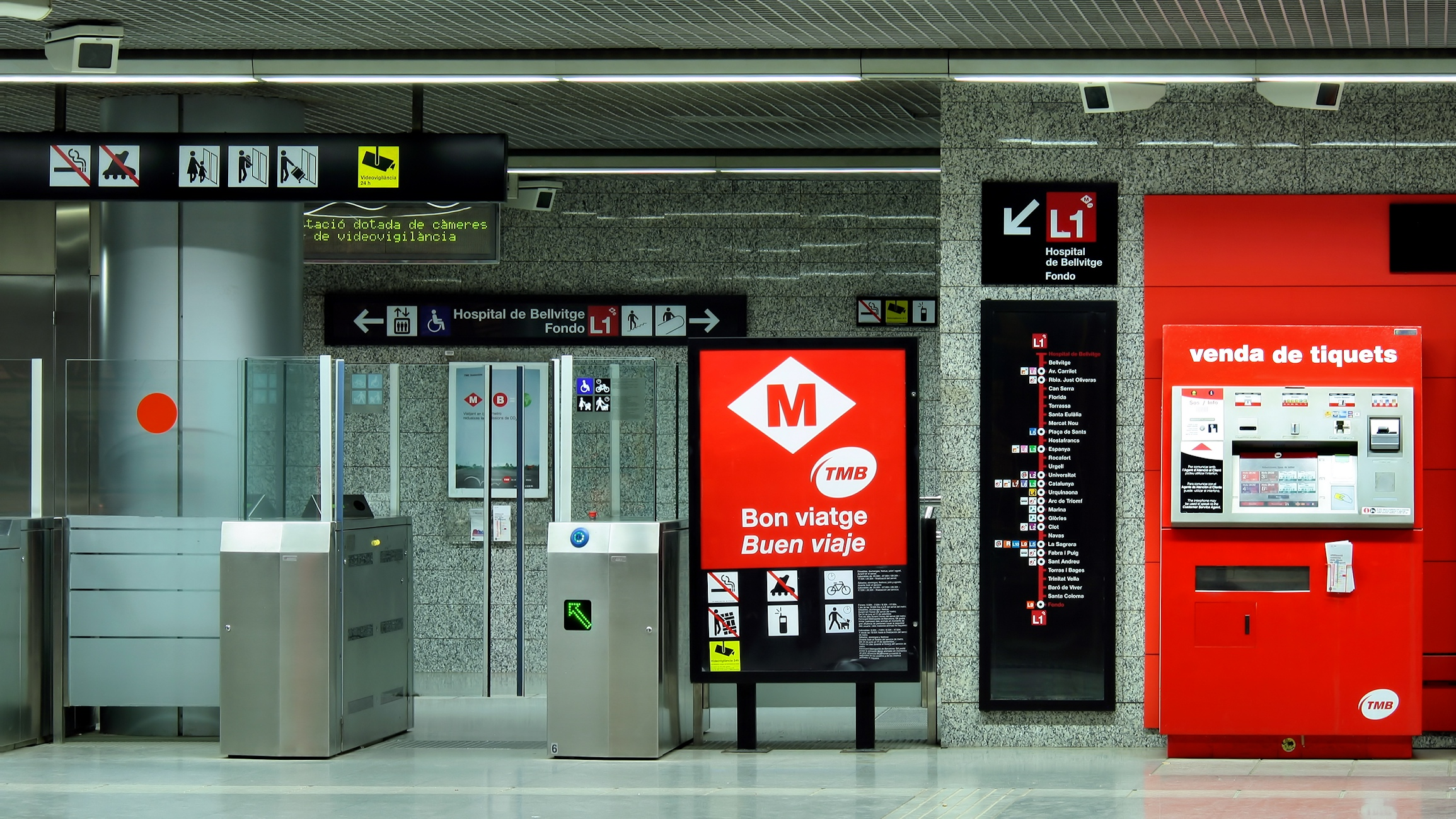
Barcelona Metro Station

TMB is the public transportation system in the city of Barcelona and includes the metro, busses, and trams. The metro alone covers 146 kilometers of Barcelona. The TMB is dedicated to combating climate change by encouraging people to use the public transportation system. The majority of pollution in the Barcelona Metropolitan Area, AMB, is due to vehicle traffic, with Barcelona having one of the highest number of vehicles per person in Europe. Barcelona has various incentives to encourage their citizens to use the public transportation available. For example, there is a metrocard called the T-Verda that gives unlimited access to public transportation for three years to people who have given up their personal cars. For other metrocards, the prices have recently been reduced by half to make them more accessible. In addition to encouraging people to take public transport, the TMB is also continuously improving the sustainability of the public transport through alternative energies.
