= Sants-Badal =

Coordinates: 41°22′31″N 2°07′36″E

- Neighborhood of Barcelona
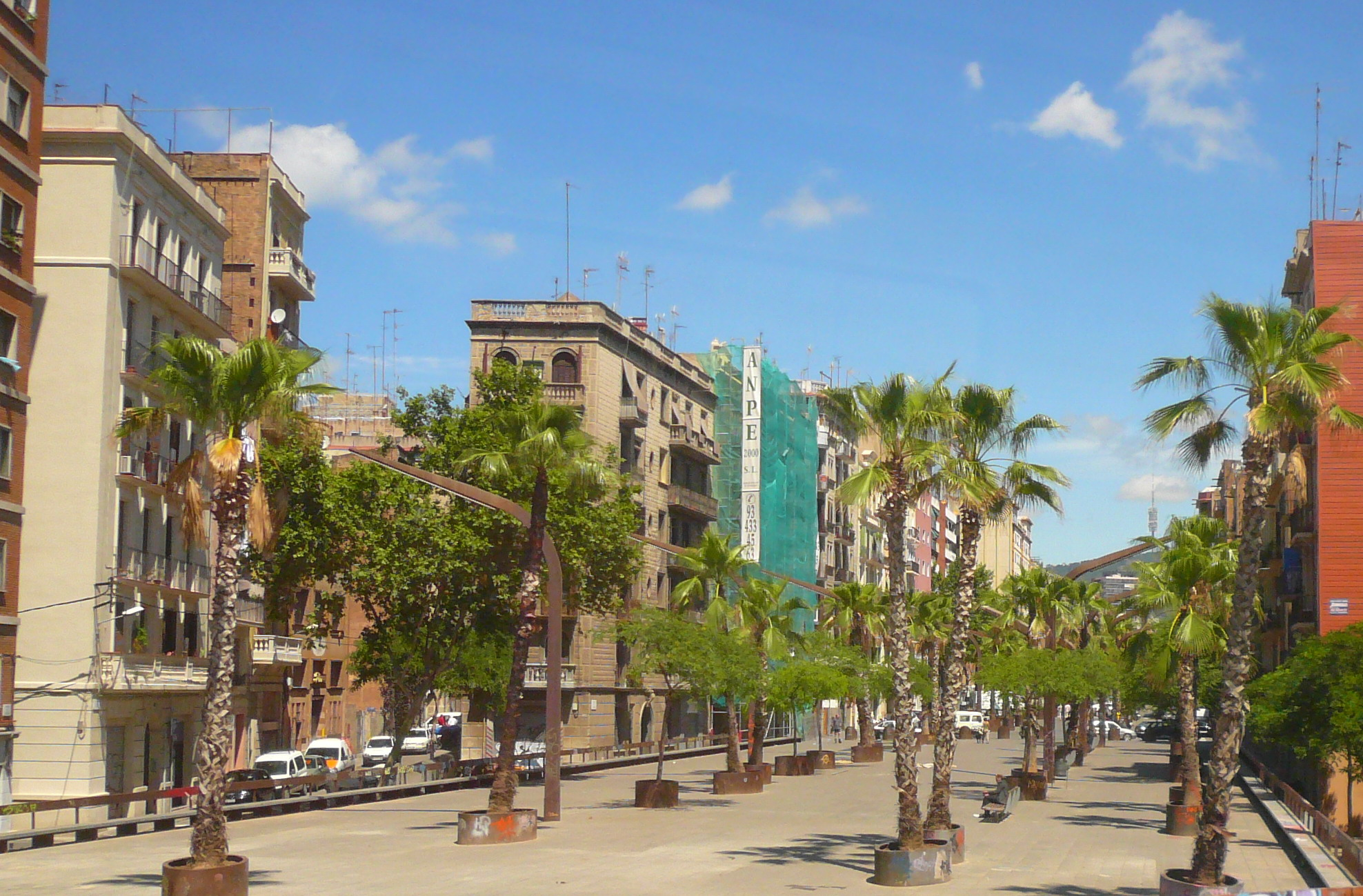
- Rambla de Badal
- Interactive map of Sants-Badal
- Country: Spain
- Autonomous community: Catalonia
- Province: Barcelona
- Comarca: Barcelonès
- Municipality: Barcelona
- District: Sants-Montjuïc

Area
  - Total: 0.411 km^{2} (0.159 sq mi)

Population
  - Total: 23,935
  - Density: 58,200/km^{2} (151,000/sq mi)

Sants-Badal (Catalan pronunciation: [ˈsanz βəˈðal]) is a neighborhood in the Sants-Montjuïc district of Barcelona, Catalonia (Spain). It belonged to the former municipality of Sants, current district of Sants-Montjuïc. Extending 0.41 km^{2} and with a population of 23,987 it is the most densely populated neighborhood in the city with a density of 58,430 inhabitants/km^{2}.
