= La Font de la Guatlla =

Coordinates: 41°22′10.85″N 2°8′41.32″E

- Neighborhood of Barcelona
- Interactive map of La Font de la Guatlla
- Country: Spain
- Autonomous community: Catalonia
- Province: Barcelona
- Comarca: Barcelonès
- Municipality: Barcelona
- District: Sants-Montjuïc

Area
  - Total: 0.302 km^{2} (0.117 sq mi)

Population
  - Total: 10,316
  - Density: 34,200/km^{2} (88,500/sq mi)
- Demonym(s): Fonter, fontera
- Time zone: UTC+1 (CET)
  - Summer (DST): UTC+2 (CEST)

La Font de la Guatlla (Catalan: [lə ˈfɔn də lə ˈɣwaʎːə]) is a neighborhood in the Sants-Montjuïc district of Barcelona, Catalonia (Spain).
