= Trinitat Vella =

Coordinates: 41°26′56.86″N 2°11′35.94″E

- Neighborhood of Barcelona
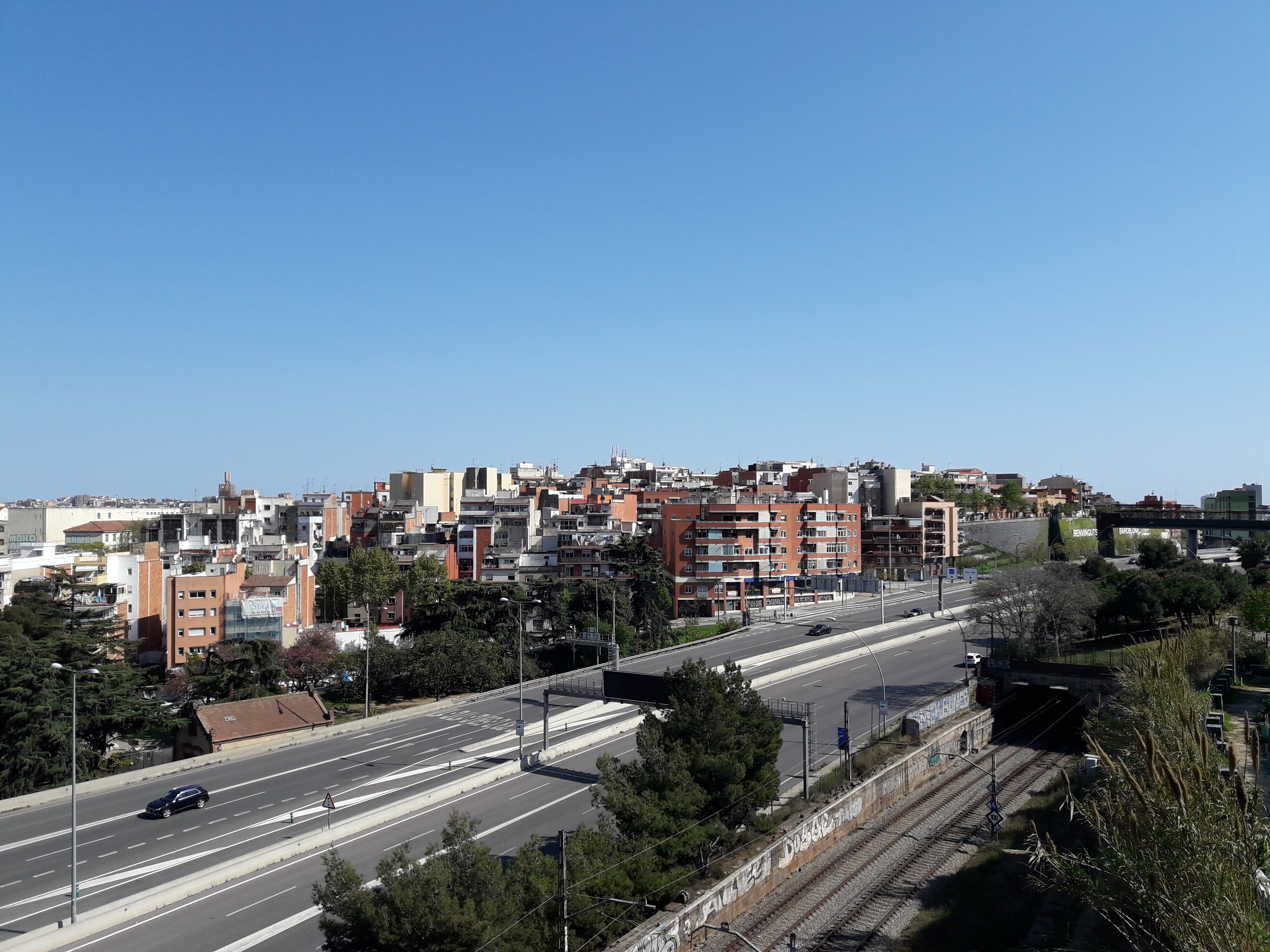
- Interactive map of Trinitat Vella
- Country: Spain
- Autonomous community: Catalonia
- Province: Barcelona
- Comarca: Barcelonès
- Municipality: Barcelona
- District: Sant Andreu

Area
  - Total: 0.81 km^{2} (0.31 sq mi)

Population
  - Total: 10,048
  - Density: 12,000/km^{2} (32,000/sq mi)

Trinitat Vella (Catalan pronunciation: [tɾiniˈtad ˈbeʎə]) is one of the seven neighborhoods in the Sant Andreu district of Barcelona, Catalonia (Spain).
