= Vilapicina i la Torre Llobeta =

Coordinates: 41°25′43.54″N 2°10′15.14″E

- Neighborhood of Barcelona
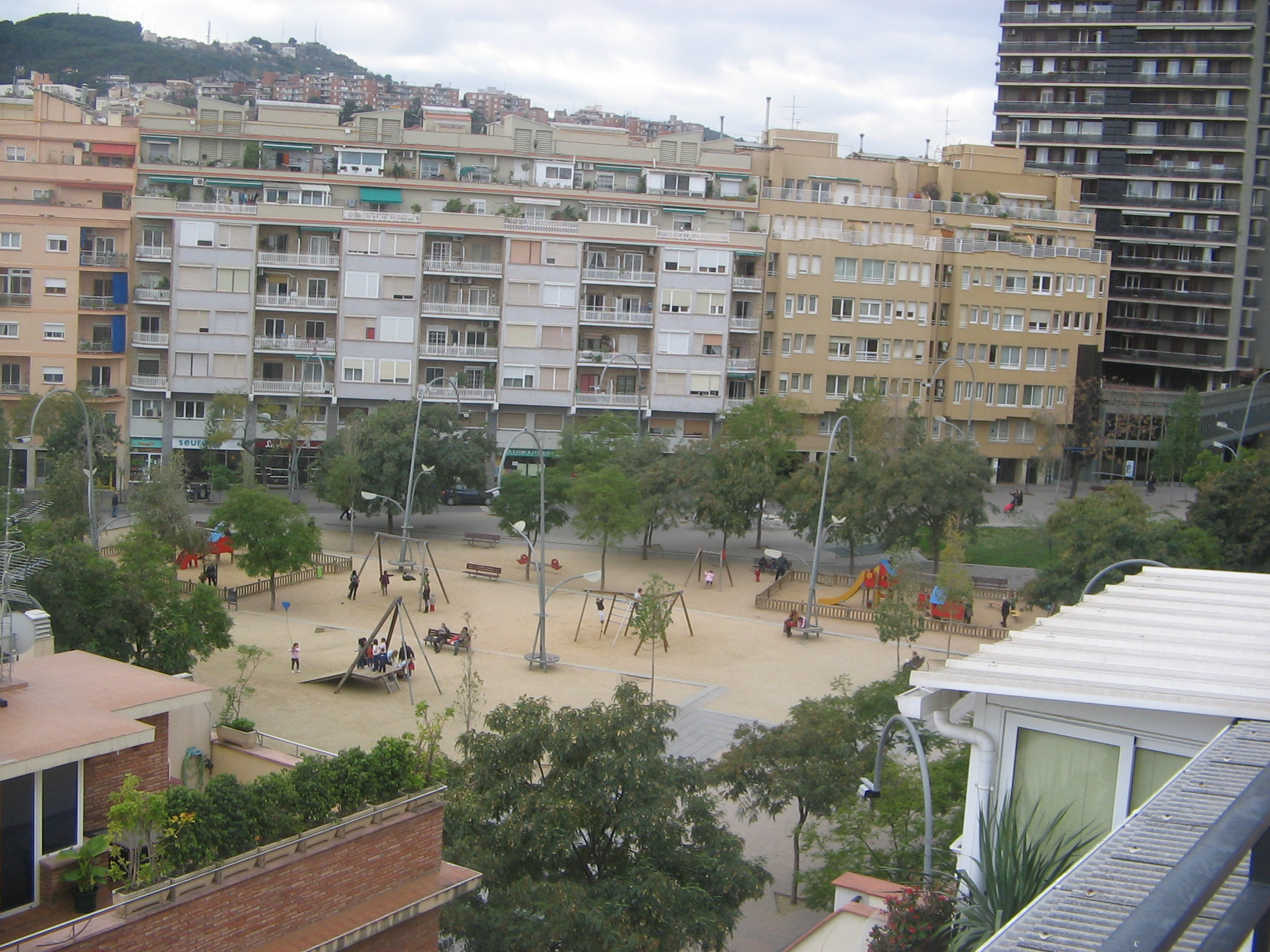
- Plaça del Virrei Amat
- Interactive map of Vilapicina i la Torre Llobeta
- Country: Spain
- Autonomous community: Catalonia
- Province: Barcelona
- Comarca: Barcelonès
- Municipality: Barcelona
- District: Nou Barris

Area
  - Total: 0.567 km^{2} (0.219 sq mi)

Population
  - Total: 25,522
  - Density: 45,000/km^{2} (117,000/sq mi)

Vilapicina i Torre Llobeta (Catalan pronunciation: [biləpiˈsinəj ˈtorə ʎuˈβɛtə]) is a neighborhood in the Nou Barris district of Barcelona, Catalonia (Spain).
