= Horta-Guinardó =

Coordinates: 41°24′47″N 2°09′59″E

- District
- Horta-Guinardó (coloured red) among the other districts of Barcelona
- Interactive map of Horta-Guinardó
- Country: Spain
- Autonomous community: Catalonia
- Province: Barcelona
- Comarca: Barcelonès
- Municipality: Barcelona

Area
  - Total: 11.92 km^{2} (4.60 sq mi)

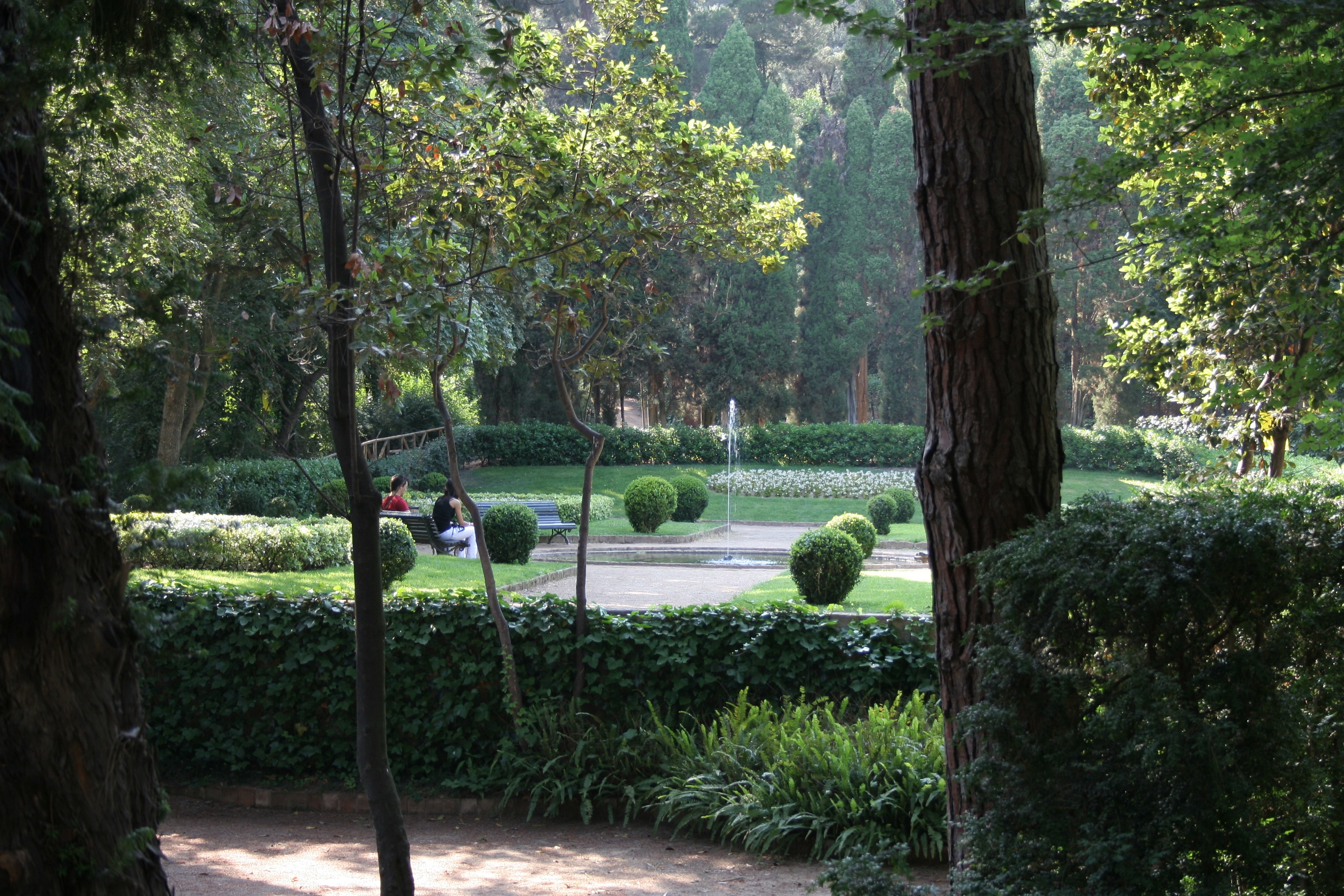
View of Laberint d'Horta

Horta-Guinardó (Catalan pronunciation: [ˈɔɾtə ɣinərˈdo], Spanish: [ˈoɾta ɣinaɾˈðo]) is the name of one of the districts of Barcelona, located in its north-eastern corner. It is named after two very heterogeneous areas of the city, Horta and El Guinardó, which together cover a large area of 11.92 km^{2}, amounting to 11.9% of the total area of the city.

A former municipality that eventually became part of the city in the late 19th century, it is bordered by five out of ten districts of Barcelona (Gràcia, Nou Barris, Eixample, Sant Andreu and Sant Martí), and by two other municipalities of the metropolitan area (Sant Cugat and Cerdanyola del Vallès). It underwent a rapid urbanisation process from the 1950s.

== Territory and demographics ==
Total inhabitants amounted to 169,920 in the 2005 census. As the third largest district in the city (after Sants-Montjuïc and Sarrià-Sant Gervasi), it is not one of the most densely populated parts of the city. It is known for the steepness of its streets, which is due to the hilly landscape in this area of Barcelona, surrounded by the hills of Collserola, Vall d'Hebron and Riera d'Horta.

== Neighbourhoods ==
- El Guinardó
- El Baix Guinardó
- Can Baró
- La Font d'en Fargues
- El Carmel
- La Teixonera (also spelt Taxonera)
- La Clota
- Horta
- La Vall d'Hebron
- Montbau
- Sant Genís dels Agudells

== See also ==
- Serra de Collserola
- Street names in Barcelona
- Urban planning of Barcelona
