= La Teixonera =

Coordinates: 41°25′23.27″N 2°8′45.07″E

- Neighborhood of Barcelona
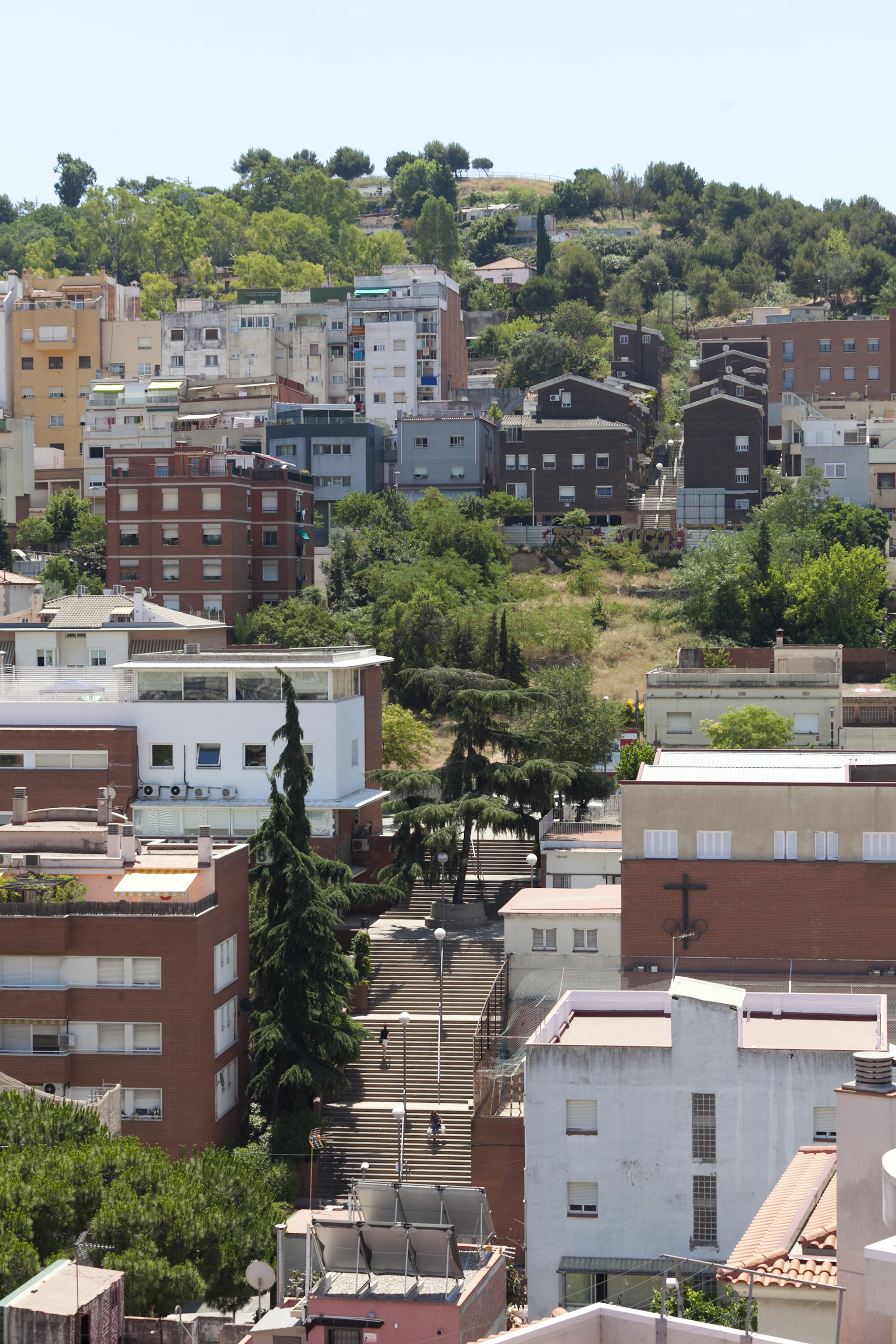
- La Teixonera as viewed from the northwest
- Interactive map of La Teixonera
- Country: Spain
- Autonomous community: Catalonia
- Province: Barcelona
- Comarca: Barcelonès
- Municipality: Barcelona
- District: Horta-Guinardó

Area
  - Total: 0.337 km^{2} (0.130 sq mi)

Population
  - Total: 11,281
  - Density: 33,500/km^{2} (86,700/sq mi)

La Teixonera (Catalan pronunciation: [lə təʃuˈneɾə]) is a neighborhood in the Horta-Guinardó district of Barcelona, Catalonia (Spain). The name honours Joaquim Taxonera, who urbanized the neighbourhood.
