= La Clota =

Neighborhood of Barcelona

Coordinates: 41°25′46″N 2°09′13″E

- Neighborhood of Barcelona
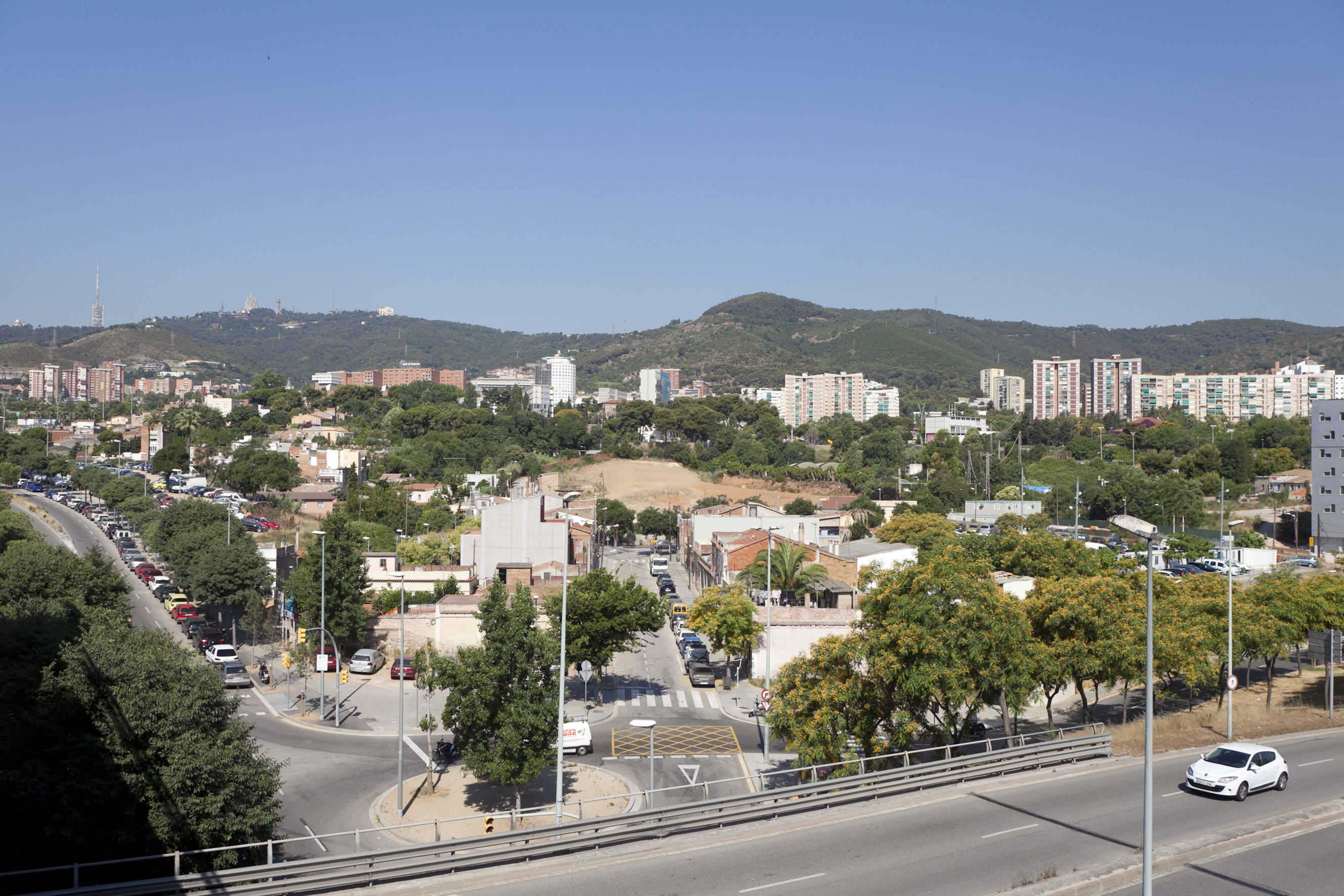
- La Clota, viewed from Rambla del Carmel in 2012
- Interactive map of La Clota
- Country: Spain
- Autonomous community: Catalonia
- Province: Barcelona
- Comarca: Barcelonès
- Municipality: Barcelona
- District: Horta-Guinardó

Area
  - Total: 0.178 km^{2} (0.069 sq mi)

Population
  - Total: 590
  - Density: 3,300/km^{2} (8,600/sq mi)

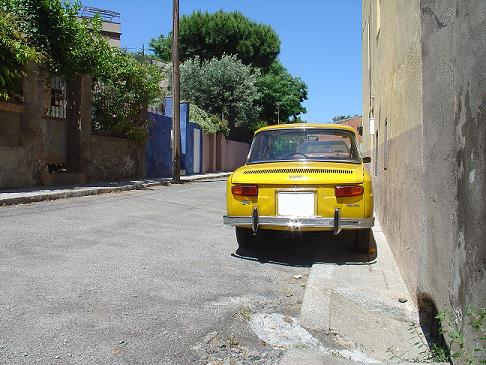
La Clota

La Clota (Catalan pronunciation: [lə ˈklɔtə], Spanish pronunciation: [la ˈklota]) is a neighborhood in the Horta-Guinardó district of Barcelona, Catalonia (Spain).
