= Vallbona, Barcelona =

Coordinates: 41°27′44.39″N 2°10′58.47″E

Vallbona
- Neighborhood of Barcelona
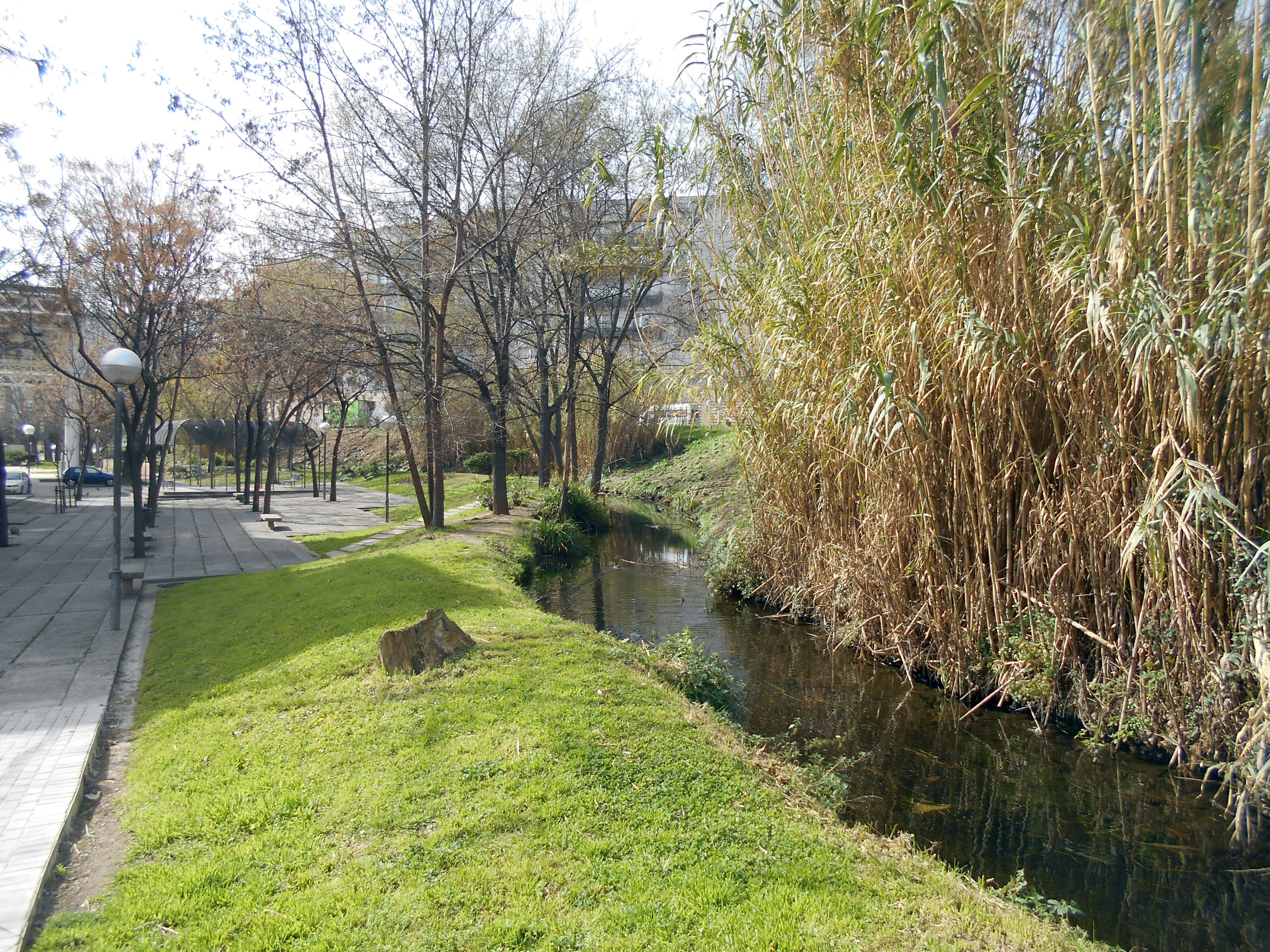
- The Rec Comtal passing through Vallbona
- Interactive map of Vallbona
- Country: Spain
- Autonomous community: Catalonia
- Province: Barcelona
- Comarca: Barcelonès
- Municipality: Barcelona
- District: Nou Barris

Area
  - Total: 0.598 km^{2} (0.231 sq mi)

Population
  - Total: 1,354
  - Density: 2,260/km^{2} (5,860/sq mi)

Vallbona (Catalan pronunciation: [ˌbaʎˈβɔnə], Spanish pronunciation: [baʎˈβona]) is a neighbourhood in the Nou Barris district of Barcelona, Catalonia (Spain), in the city's northern outskirts.

It covers an area of 0.6 square kilometres (0.23 sq mi), in a hilly region just south of Montcada, between on one side the railway lines running alongside the Besòs river, and on the other side the motorways running along the valley which separate the village from the rest of Barcelona. It is connected to Torre Baró and the rest of the Nou Barris district by a bridge spanning the motorways.

Vallbona was a small village until the middle of the twentieth century when most of it was demolished, the Rec Comtal canal mostly covered over, and high-density housing built. The motorways were built starting in the 1960s.

Its population in 2013 was 1,330, giving a population density of 2,224 per km^{2}.
