= La Font d'en Fargues =

Coordinates: 41°25′29.7″N 2°9′55.9″E

- Neighborhood of Barcelona
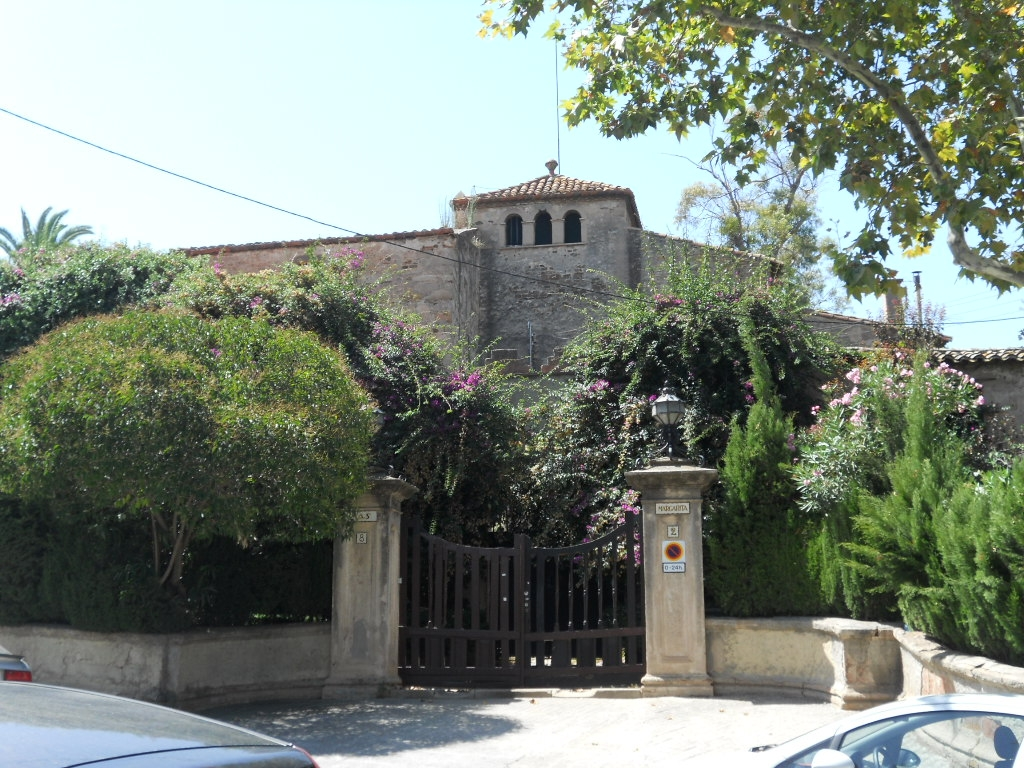
- Masia of Can Fargas
- Interactive map of La Font d'en Fargues
- Country: Spain
- Autonomous community: Catalonia
- Province: Barcelona
- Comarca: Barcelonès
- Municipality: Barcelona
- District: Horta-Guinardó

Area
  - Total: 0.657 km^{2} (0.254 sq mi)

Population
  - Total: 9,402
  - Density: 14,300/km^{2} (37,100/sq mi)

La Font d'en Fargues (Catalan pronunciation: [lə ˈfɔn dəɱ ˈfarɣəs]) is a neighborhood in the Horta-Guinardó district of Barcelona, Catalonia (Spain).
