= Sant Andreu de Palomar =

Independent village of Catalonia

Coordinates: 41°26′7.98″N 2°11′24.58″E

- Neighborhood of Barcelona
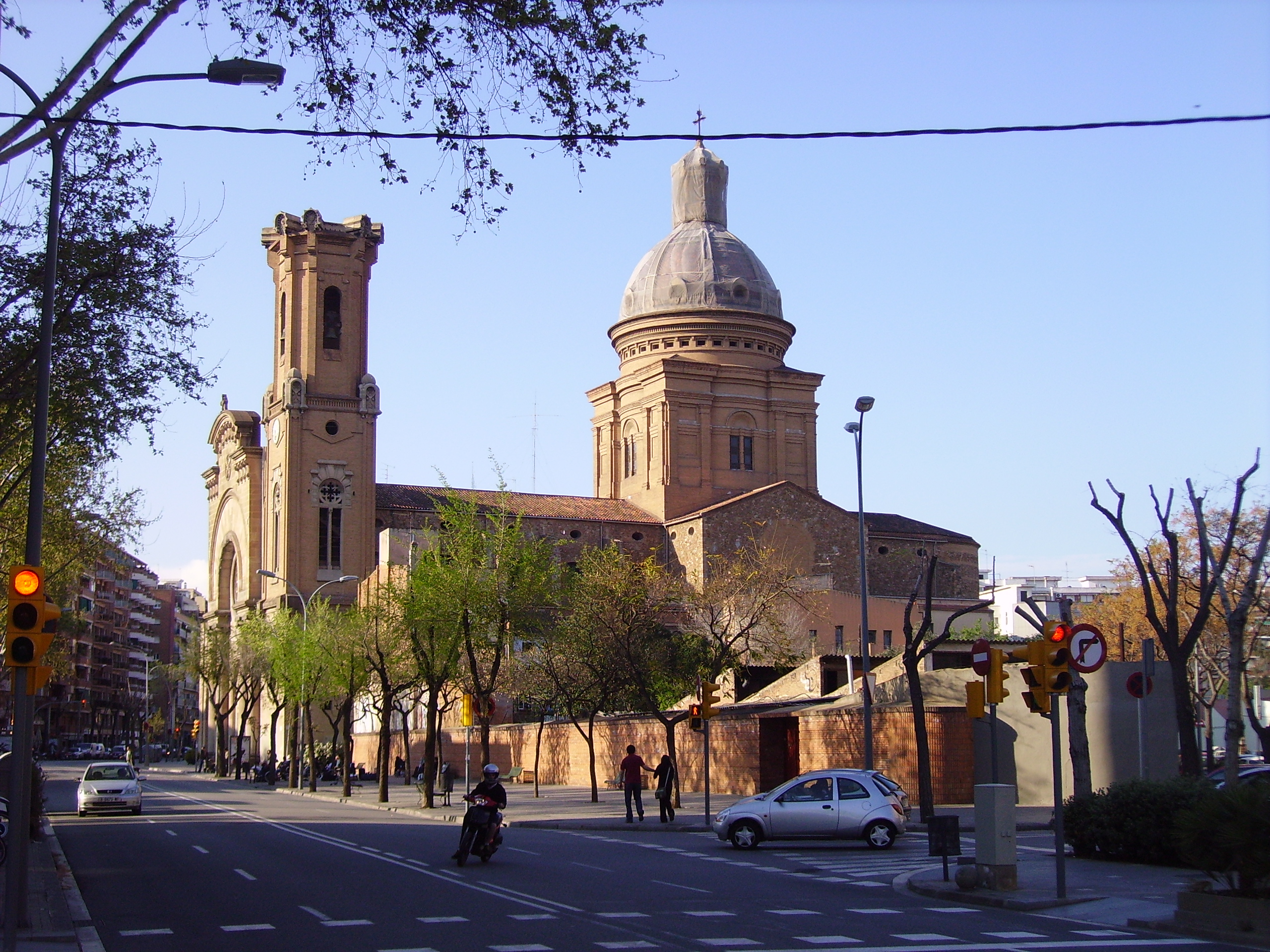
- Church of Sant Andreu de Palomar
- Interactive map of Sant Andreu de Palomar
- Country: Spain
- Autonomous community: Catalonia
- Province: Barcelona
- Comarca: Barcelonès
- Municipality: Barcelona
- District: Sant Andreu

Area
  - Total: 1.841 km^{2} (0.711 sq mi)

Population
  - Total: 56,695
  - Density: 30,800/km^{2} (79,760/sq mi)

Sant Andreu de Palomar (Catalan pronunciation: [ˌsant ənˈdɾew ðə pəluˈma]) is a neighbourhood of Barcelona. It's the oldest part of the Sant Andreu district. It was an independent old town with over 1,000 years of recorded history before being annexed to Barcelona on 20 April 1897.

It has an area of 174 hectares and has a population of about 55,000 inhabitants. Its boundaries are: the street Rovira i Virgili, old Riera de Horta, Passeig de Santa Coloma, the Meridiana Avenue and the railroad tracks.

== History ==
Around the 8th century, in a document of towns near Barcelona, Sant Andreu de Palomar was mentioned. It is known that there have been three religious buildings in the history of the town (all Roman Catholic): the primitive "Ermita de San Andres", Hermitage of the Segadors (reapers in English, named after the revolt of the reapers of the Catalan peasants against the Hispanic monarchy) which is currently abandoned and the church of Sant Andreu which continues today. Siemore was a town of peasants, considered by the ancient citizens of Barcelona as "poor peasants." With the New Plant Decrees (made by Philip V to eliminate the Catalan language, culture and institutions) he made the town of San Andres de Palomar official (in Spanish, for the elimination of the Catalan language)

In the 19th century, during the industrial revolution, the famous Fabra i Coats textile factory came into operation. At the end of the 19th century, it was annexed by Barcelona. In the 20th century, urbanization began following the Cerdà urban plan. Here, an army barracks was installed, which was taken by the anarcho-syndicalists in the civil war. During Franco's dictatorship, a large part of its territory was taken away, creating the Nou Barris district (nine neighborhoods). In the 21st century, it has become a highly sought-after place to live, thanks to its neighborhood atmosphere (many describe it as a village atmosphere), the beauty of the old town (the best preserved of the old towns in Barcelona).

The town had opposed its annexation by Barcelona and maintains its independent identity, periodically holding symbolic referendums to assert its independence.
