= Bon Pastor =

Coordinates: 41°26′11″N 2°12′05″E

- Neighborhood of Barcelona
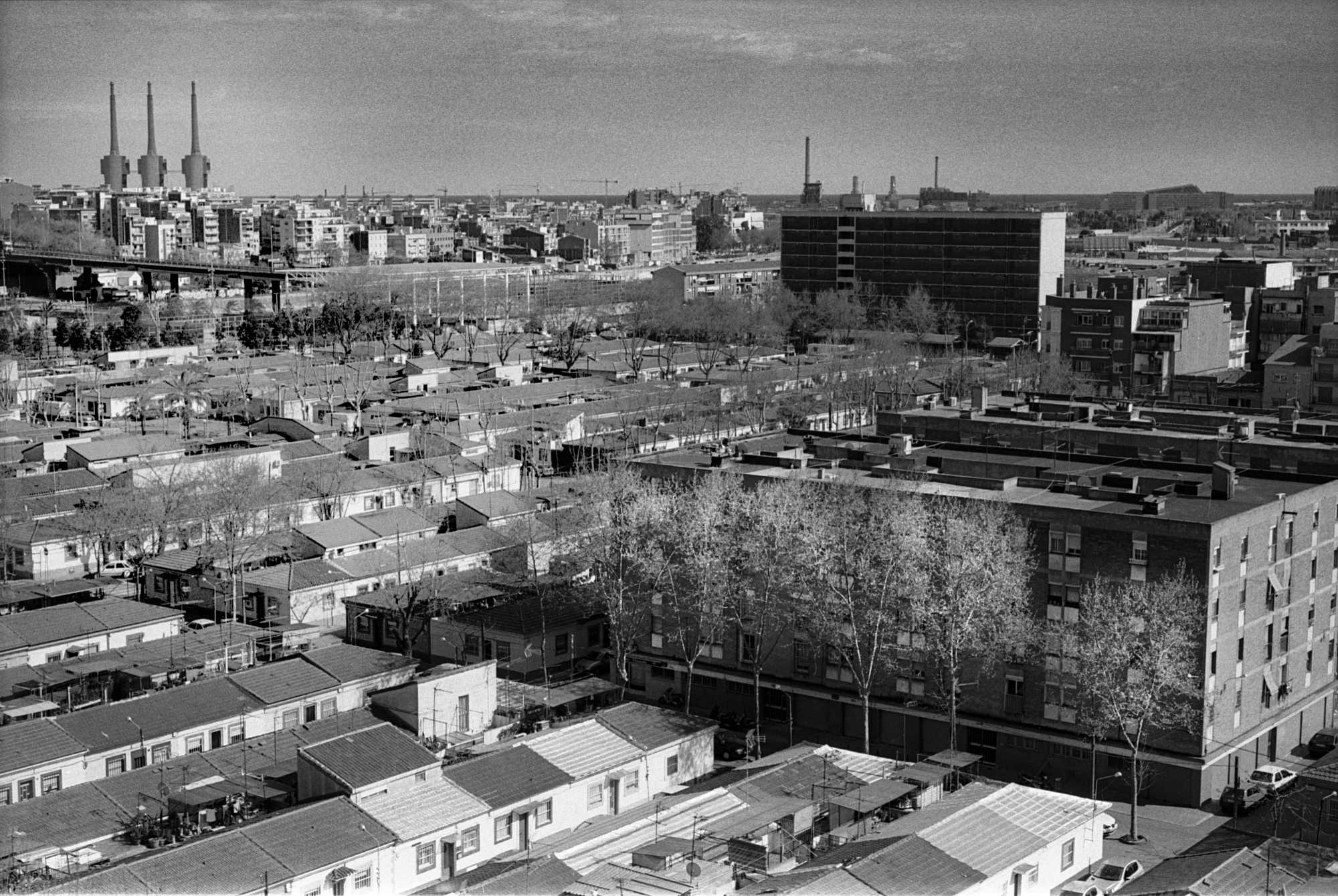
- Cases Barates in Bon Pastor (2004)
- Interactive map of Bon Pastor
- Country: Spain
- Autonomous community: Catalonia
- Province: Barcelona
- Comarca: Barcelonès
- Municipality: Barcelona
- District: Sant Andreu

Area
  - Total: 1.882 km^{2} (0.727 sq mi)

Population
  - Total: 12,594
  - Density: 6,692/km^{2} (17,330/sq mi)

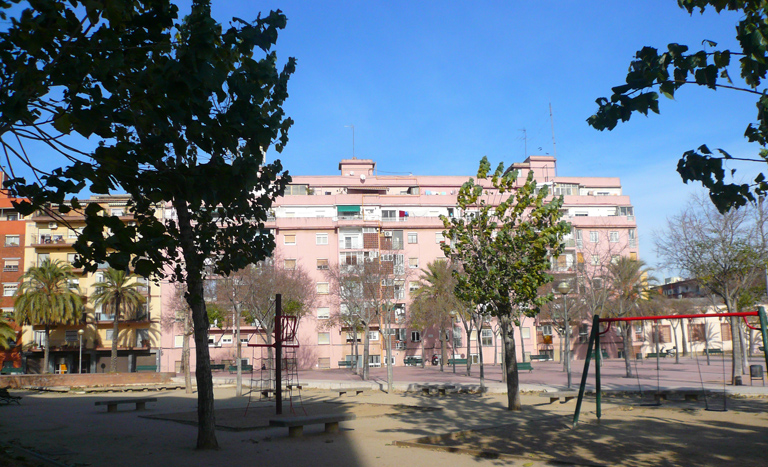
Mossen Joan Cortinas Square

Bon Pastor (Catalan pronunciation: [ˈbɔm pəsˈto]) is a neighbourhood in Sant Andreu, a district in the city of Barcelona, Spain. It has been served by the Barcelona Metro station Bon Pastor since April 2010.
