= Torre Baró =

Coordinates: 41°27′30″N 2°10′51″E

- Neighborhood of Barcelona
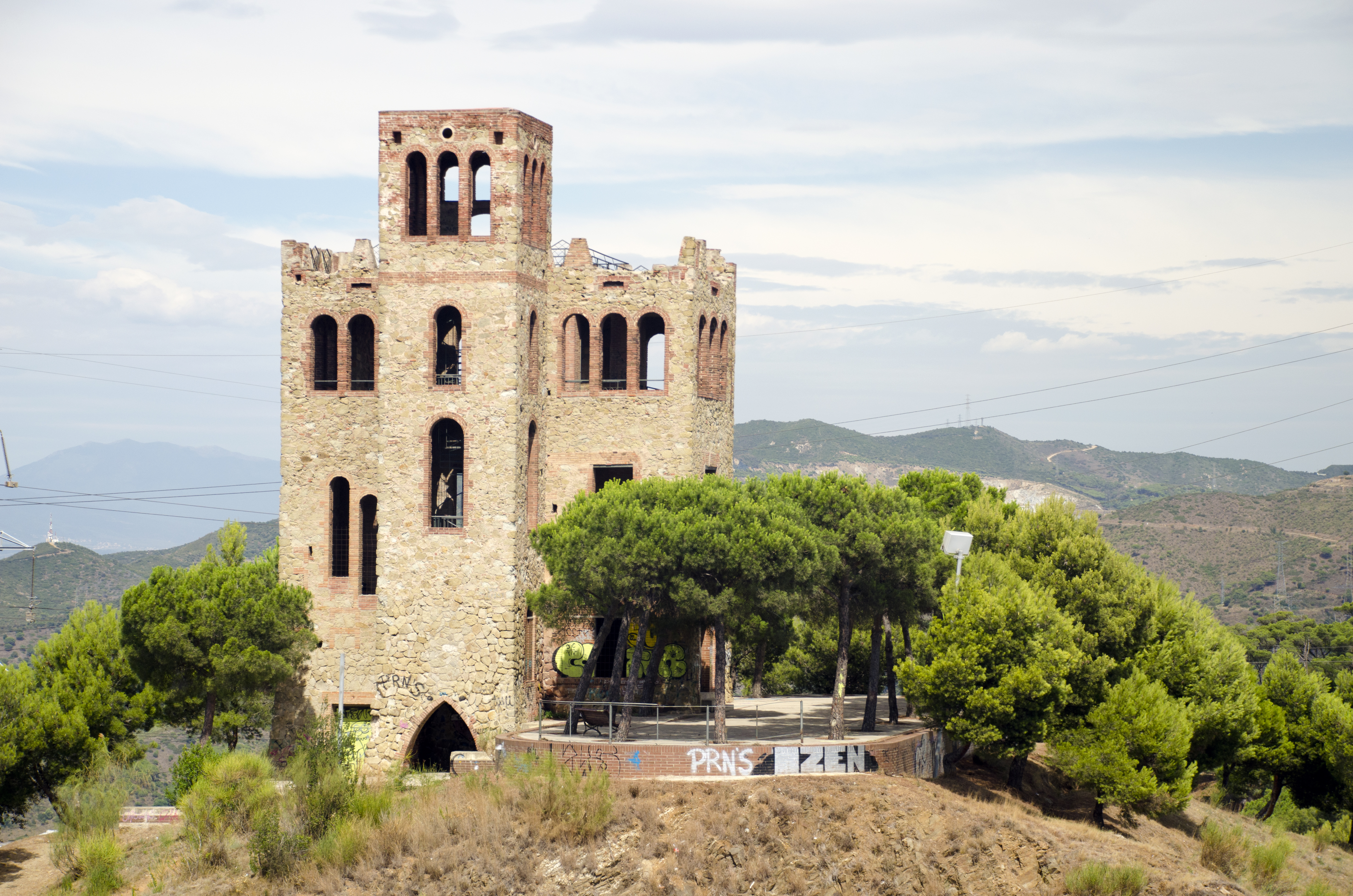
- Torre del Baró castle
- Interactive map of Torre Baró
- Country: Spain
- Autonomous community: Catalonia
- Province: Barcelona
- Comarca: Barcelonès
- Municipality: Barcelona
- District: Nou Barris

Area
  - Total: 1.768 km^{2} (0.683 sq mi)

Population
  - Total: 2,795
  - Density: 1,581/km^{2} (4,094/sq mi)

Torre Baró (Catalan pronunciation: [ˈtorə βəˈɾo]) is a neighbourhood (Catalan: barri) in the Nou Barris district of Barcelona, Catalonia (Spain).

== In popular culture ==
- In 1978, Torre Baró resident, Manolo Vital, 'hijacked' Barcelona's line 47 bus in an act of civil disobedience to show authorities that busses could reach his mountainous neighborhood. His story and the history of Torre Baró's shantytowns are dramatized in the Goya Awards Best Picture-winning film,The 47.
