= Les Roquetes, Barcelona =

Neighborhood of Barcelona, Spain

Coordinates: 41°26′55.12″N 2°10′19.31″E

Les Roquetes
- Neighborhood of Barcelona
- Interactive map of Les Roquetes
- Country: Spain
- Autonomous community: Catalonia
- Province: Barcelona
- Comarca: Barcelonès
- Municipality: Barcelona
- District: Nou Barris

Area
  - Total: 0.642 km^{2} (0.248 sq mi)

Population
  - Total: 15,428
  - Density: 24,000/km^{2} (62,200/sq mi)

Les Roquetes (Catalan pronunciation: [ruˈkɛtəs]) is a neighborhood in the Nou Barris district of the city of Barcelona, Catalonia, Spain.

Roquetes metro station, on line L3 of the Barcelona Metro, lies in the neighbourhood.
