= Canyelles (neighbourhood) =

Neighbourhood in Barcelona, Spain

Coordinates: 41°26′34″N 2°09′58″E

- Neighborhood of Barcelona
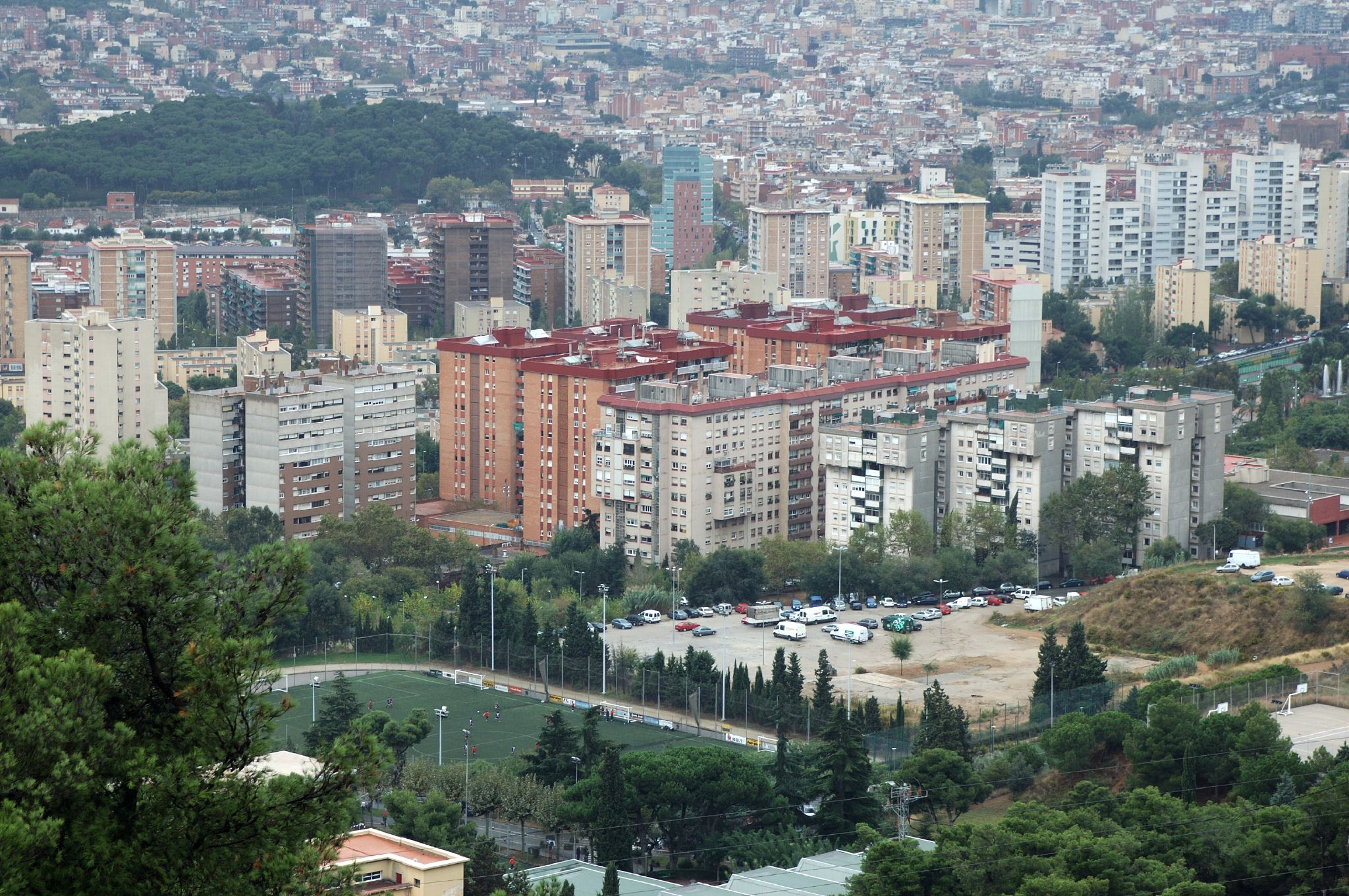
- Canyelles as viewed from Turó de Roquetes
- Interactive map of Canyelles
- Country: Spain
- Autonomous community: Catalonia
- Province: Barcelona
- Comarca: Barcelonès
- Municipality: Barcelona
- District: Nou Barris

Area
  - Total: 0.793 km^{2} (0.306 sq mi)

Population
  - Total: 6,925
  - Density: 8,730/km^{2} (22,600/sq mi)

Canyelles (Catalan pronunciation: [kəˈɲeʎəs], Spanish pronunciation: [kaˈɲeʎas]) is a neighbourhood in the Nou Barris district of the city of Barcelona, Catalonia, Spain.

Canyelles metro station, on line L3 of the Barcelona Metro, lies on the southern boundary of the neighbourhood.
