= Nou Barris =

Coordinates: 41°26′29″N 2°10′19″E

- District
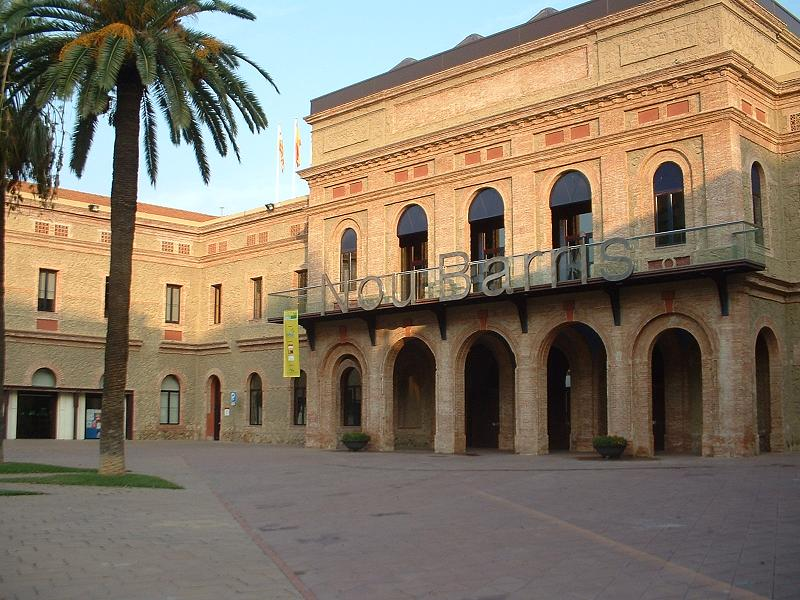
- Nou Barris council offices

- Districts of Barcelona, Nou Barris coloured red
- Interactive map of Nou Barris
- Country: Spain
- Autonomous community: Catalonia
- Province: Barcelona
- Comarca: Barcelonès
- Municipality: Barcelona

Area
  - Total: 8.04 km^{2} (3.10 sq mi)

Subdivisions of Nou Barris.

Nou Barris (Catalan pronunciation: [ˈnɔw ˈβaris], lit. "nine neighbourhoods", Spanish pronunciation: [ˈnow ˈβaris]) is one of the ten districts into which Barcelona has been officially divided since 1984. The name refers to the original nine neighbourhoods it was composed of, even though nowadays it is made up of thirteen. It covers an area of 8.04 km^{2}.

It is located in the northern part of the city adjacent to two other districts of Barcelona: Sant Andreu and Horta-Guinardó and grew up extensively out of small urbanised areas near the former municipalities of Sant Joan d'Horta and Sant Andreu de Palomar (now neighbourhoods of Barcelona) in the 20th century, especially from the 1950s on. The district council is located in a former mental institution, the Institut Mental de la Santa Creu.

== Neighbourhoods ==
It is further divided into these neighbourhoods:

- Can Peguera
- Canyelles
- Ciutat Meridiana
- La Guineueta
- Porta
- La Prosperitat
- Les Roquetes
- Torre Baró
- La Trinitat Nova
- El Turó de la Peira
- Vallbona
- Verdum
- Vilapicina i la Torre Llobeta

== Demographics ==
In 1998 it had 168,837 inhabitants, having lost over 20,000 people from a population peak in 1991. It is the district of Barcelona with the largest Romani community. In 2005 the population went down again, with 16,981 inhabitants. Since 2000 it has become one of the areas of the city with the strongest presence of immigrants, especially from Romania, Ukraine and Ecuador, and has been largely rehabilitated by the city council. Its density is 20,520 inhabitants/km^{2}.

== See also ==
- Districts of Barcelona
- Street names in Barcelona
- Urban planning of Barcelona
