= El Turó de la Peira =

Neighborhood in Barcelona, Spain

Coordinates: 41°25′58.83″N 2°9′56.91″E

Turó de la Peira
- Neighborhood of Barcelona
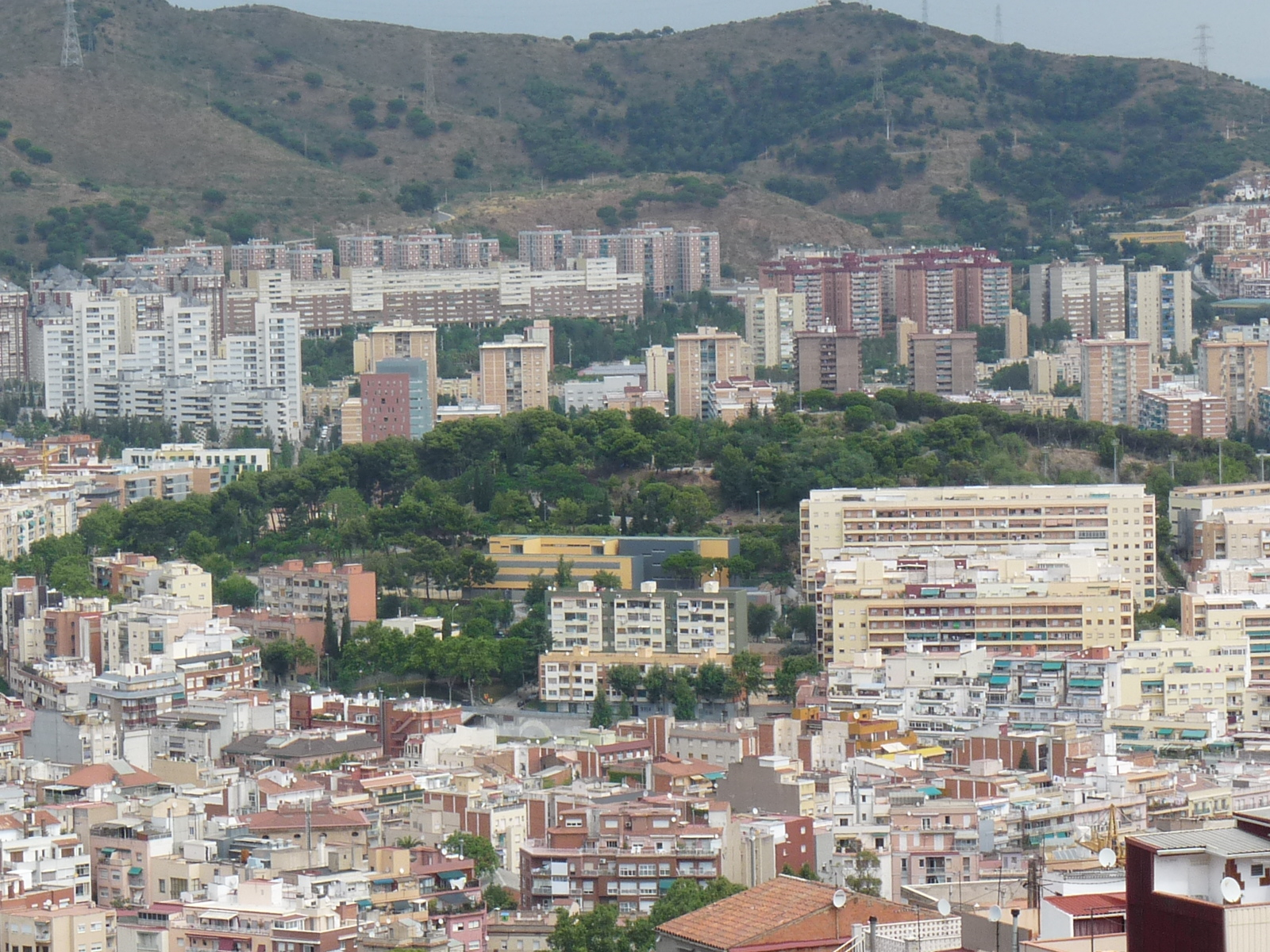
- Interactive map of Turó de la Peira
- Country: Spain
- Autonomous community: Catalonia
- Province: Barcelona
- Comarca: Barcelonès
- Municipality: Barcelona
- District: Nou Barris

Area
  - Total: 0.354 km^{2} (0.137 sq mi)

Population
  - Total: 15,373
  - Density: 43,400/km^{2} (112,000/sq mi)
- Demonym(s): peirenc, -a

Turó de la Peira (Catalan pronunciation: [əl tuˈɾo ðə lə ˈpɛjɾə], Spanish pronunciation: [el tuˈɾo ðe la ˈpejɾa]) is a neighborhood in the Nou Barris district of Barcelona, Catalonia (Spain).
