= Baró de Viver =

- Neighborhood
- Interactive map of Baró de Viver
- Country: Spain
- Autonomous community: Catalonia
- Province: Barcelona
- Comarca: Barcelonès
- Municipality: Barcelona
- District: Sant Andreu

Area
  - Total: 0.23 km^{2} (0.089 sq mi)

Population
  - Total: 2,511
  - Density: 11,000/km^{2} (28,000/sq mi)

Baró de Viver (Catalan pronunciation: [bəˈɾo ðə βiˈβe]) is a neighborhood in the Sant Andreu district of Barcelona, Catalonia (Spain).
