= La Guineueta, Barcelona =

Coordinates: 41°26′28.83″N 2°10′19.15″E

La Guineueta
- Neighborhood of Barcelona
- Interactive map of La Guineueta
- Country: Spain
- Autonomous community: Catalonia
- Province: Barcelona
- Comarca: Barcelonès
- Municipality: Barcelona
- District: Nou Barris

Area
  - Total: 0.611 km^{2} (0.236 sq mi)

Population
  - Total: 15,050
  - Density: 24,600/km^{2} (63,800/sq mi)

La Guineueta (Catalan pronunciation: [lə ɣinəˈwɛtə]; "The Little Vixen") is one of the nine original neighbourhoods that gave name to the district Nou Barris (literally, nine neighbourhoods) in Barcelona. Despite its name, the district has 13 neighbourhoods.

Its size is about 57 ha. located between Parc Central dels Nou Barris and Parc de la Guineueta, and between Plaça de Karl Marx and Plaça de Llucmajor. Modern construction in the area began in the 1950s, and was settled by migrants from other parts of Spain. Before then there were just a few abandoned vineyards and cereal fields and the ruins of an aqueduct.

The name of the neighbourhood means "little fox" in Catalan and was the name of a mas (a country house) of the area.

The area known as Guineueta Nova was renamed as Canyelles in the 1970s.
