= Districts of Barcelona =

The city's ten districts.

Barcelona, Catalonia, Spain is divided into 10 districts. These are administered by a councillor designated by the main city council, and each of them have some powers relating to issues such as urbanism or infrastructure in their area. The current division of the city into different districts was approved in 1984. In 2009 Barcelona started using a new division of 73 neighbourhoods (the 10 districts are still in use), a division that was done for a better service from the City Council.

Some of these districts have a previous history as independent municipalities which were integrated into the city of Barcelona during the late 19th century and the first half of the 20th century, such as Sarrià, Les Corts, Sant Andreu de Palomar, Gràcia or Sant Martí de Provençals. However, other municipalities which are contiguous to Barcelona (such as L'Hospitalet de Llobregat, Badalona, Sant Adrià de Besòs or Montcada i Reixac) have remained separate towns to this day, and are part of the much larger metropolitan area of Barcelona.

Districts and neighbourhoods of Barcelona (2021)
Nº.	District	Location	Size km^{2}	Population	Density inhabitants/km^{2}	Neighbourhoods			
Nº.	District	Location	Size km^{2}	Population	Density inhabitants/km^{2}	Nº	Name	Population	Size (ha)
1	Old City		4.11	109,672	26,684.2	1	El Raval	48,688	110
1	Old City		4.11	109,672	26,684.2	2	El Gòtic	22,850	81.6
1	Old City		4.11	109,672	26,684.2	3	La Barceloneta	15,125	109.5
1	Old City		4.11	109,672	26,684.2	4	Sant Pere, Santa Caterina i la Ribera	23,009	111
2	Eixample		7.46	269,349	36,105.8	5	Fort Pienc	33,445	92.9
2	Eixample		7.46	269,349	36,105.8	6	Sagrada Família	52,164	104.2
2	Eixample		7.46	269,349	36,105.8	7	Dreta de l'Eixample	44,088	212
2	Eixample		7.46	269,349	36,105.8	8	L'Antiga Esquerra de l'Eixample	43,046	122.8
2	Eixample		7.46	269,349	36,105.8	9	La Nova Esquerra de l'Eixample	57,906	134.1
2	Eixample		7.46	269,349	36,105.8	10	Sant Antoni	38,700	80.4
3	Sants-Montjuïc		22.68	187,026	8,246.3	11	Poble-sec	40,204	458.5
3	Sants-Montjuïc		22.68	187,026	8,246.3	12	la Marina del Prat Vermell	1,356	1,403.4
3	Sants-Montjuïc		22.68	187,026	8,246.3	13	la Marina de Port	31,092	126.9
3	Sants-Montjuïc		22.68	187,026	8,246.3	14	la Font de la Guatlla	10,239	29.7
3	Sants-Montjuïc		22.68	187,026	8,246.3	15	Hostafrancs	16,102	41
3	Sants-Montjuïc		22.68	187,026	8,246.3	16	la Bordeta	19,451	57.2
3	Sants-Montjuïc		22.68	187,026	8,246.3	17	Sants-Badal	24,903	41.5
3	Sants-Montjuïc		22.68	187,026	8,246.3	18	Sants	43,679	109.5
4	Les Corts		6.02	81,576	13,550.8	19	les Corts	45,943	141
4	Les Corts		6.02	81,576	13,550.8	20	la Maternitat i Sant Ramon	23,825	191.5
4	Les Corts		6.02	81,576	13,550.8	21	Pedralbes	11,808	268.5
5	Sarrià-Sant Gervasi		19.91	149,201	7,493.8	22	Vallvidrera, el Tibidabo i les Planes	4,760	1,132.9
5	Sarrià-Sant Gervasi		19.91	149,201	7,493.8	23	Sarrià	24,769	304.7
5	Sarrià-Sant Gervasi		19.91	149,201	7,493.8	24	les Tres Torres	16,356	78.8
5	Sarrià-Sant Gervasi		19.91	149,201	7,493.8	25	Sant Gervasi - la Bonanova	25,984	223.4
5	Sarrià-Sant Gervasi		19.91	149,201	7,493.8	26	Sant Gervasi - Galvany	47,346	166.9
5	Sarrià-Sant Gervasi		19.91	149,201	7,493.8	27	el Putxet i el Farró	29,986	84.8
6	Gràcia		4.19	123,276	29,421.5	28	Vallcarca i els Penitents	16,325	125.1
6	Gràcia		4.19	123,276	29,421.5	29	el Coll	7,688	35.3
6	Gràcia		4.19	123,276	29,421.5	30	la Salut	13,455	64.8
6	Gràcia		4.19	123,276	29,421.5	31	Vila de Gràcia	50,456	132.1
6	Gràcia		4.19	123,276	29,421.5	32	Camp d'en Grassot i Gràcia Nova	35,352	65.1
7	Horta-Guinardó		11.96	173,944	14,543.8	33	el Baix Guinardó	25,842	56.2
7	Horta-Guinardó		11.96	173,944	14,543.8	34	Can Baró	9,320	38.4
7	Horta-Guinardó		11.96	173,944	14,543.8	35	el Guinardó	37,325	130.9
7	Horta-Guinardó		11.96	173,944	14,543.8	36	la Font d'en Fargues	9,505	65.7
7	Horta-Guinardó		11.96	173,944	14,543.8	37	el Carmel	32,724	94
7	Horta-Guinardó		11.96	173,944	14,543.8	38	la Teixonera	12,044	33.8
7	Horta-Guinardó		11.96	173,944	14,543.8	39	Sant Genís dels Agudells	7,385	168.1
7	Horta-Guinardó		11.96	173,944	14,543.8	40	Montbau	5,114	205.5
7	Horta-Guinardó		11.96	173,944	14,543.8	41	la Vall d'Hebron	5,932	74.5
7	Horta-Guinardó		11.96	173,944	14,543.8	42	la Clota	698	17.8
7	Horta-Guinardó		11.96	173,944	14,543.8	43	Horta	28,055	307
8	Nou Barris		8.05	173,552	21,559.3	44	Vilapicina i la Torre Llobeta	25,875	56.4
8	Nou Barris		8.05	173,552	21,559.3	45	Porta	27,796	83.7
8	Nou Barris		8.05	173,552	21,559.3	46	el Turó de la Peira	16,186	35.4
8	Nou Barris		8.05	173,552	21,559.3	47	Can Peguera	2,215	11.9
8	Nou Barris		8.05	173,552	21,559.3	48	la Guineueta	15,267	61.2
8	Nou Barris		8.05	173,552	21,559.3	49	Canyelles	6,813	79
8	Nou Barris		8.05	173,552	21,559.3	50	les Roquetes	16,563	64.3
8	Nou Barris		8.05	173,552	21,559.3	51	Verdum	12,865	23.7
8	Nou Barris		8.05	173,552	21,559.3	52	la Prosperitat	26,868	59.1
8	Nou Barris		8.05	173,552	21,559.3	53	la Trinitat Nova	7,628	57.7
8	Nou Barris		8.05	173,552	21,559.3	54	Torre Baró	2,923	174.2
8	Nou Barris		8.05	173,552	21,559.3	55	Ciutat Meridiana	11,152	37.7
8	Nou Barris		8.05	173,552	21,559.3	56	Vallbona	1,401	60.8
9	Sant Andreu		6.59	151,537	22,995	57	la Trinitat Vella	10,513	80.8
9	Sant Andreu		6.59	151,537	22,995	58	Baró de Viver	2,653	23
9	Sant Andreu		6.59	151,537	22,995	59	Bon Pastor	13,730	186.5
9	Sant Andreu		6.59	151,537	22,995	60	Sant Andreu de Palomar	58,225	186.7
9	Sant Andreu		6.59	151,537	22,995	61	la Sagrera	29,568	98.6
9	Sant Andreu		6.59	151,537	22,995	62	el Congrés i els Indians	14,549	40.9
9	Sant Andreu		6.59	151,537	22,995	63	Navas	22,299	42.4
10	Sant Martí		10.39	241,181	23,212.8	64	el Camp de l'Arpa del Clot	38,838	74.1
10	Sant Martí		10.39	241,181	23,212.8	65	el Clot	26,759	69.7
10	Sant Martí		10.39	241,181	23,212.8	66	el Parc i la Llacuna del Poblenou	15,914	112.2
10	Sant Martí		10.39	241,181	23,212.8	67	la Vila Olímpica del Poblenou	9,395	92.5
10	Sant Martí		10.39	241,181	23,212.8	68	Poblenou	34,411	156.7
10	Sant Martí		10.39	241,181	23,212.8	69	Diagonal Mar i el Front Marítim del Poblenou	13,536	120.3
10	Sant Martí		10.39	241,181	23,212.8	70	el Besòs i el Maresme	26,116	118.5
10	Sant Martí		10.39	241,181	23,212.8	71	Provençals del Poblenou	21,185	108.6
10	Sant Martí		10.39	241,181	23,212.8	72	Sant Martí de Provençals	26,229	73.4
10	Sant Martí		10.39	241,181	23,212.8	73	la Verneda i la Pau	28,798	112.7
Note *: Montjuïc and Zona Franca are not neighbourhoods but are in the district of Sants-Montjuïc.

== District No. 11 ==
District No. 11 is not a geographical district, but an international development initiative, established by the City Council of Barcelona to coordinate solidarity and resources. It was launched in 1992 by Mayor Pasqual Maragall during Bosnian War to help to rebuild the Bosnian capital Sarajevo. On September 22, 2025, in the context of the Gaza War, the City Council granted Gaza and the rest of the Palestinian cities the status of District No. 11 aiming to mitigate the atrocities of Israel's illegal occupation of Palestinian territories.

== Gallery ==
Detailed map of districts of Barcelona.

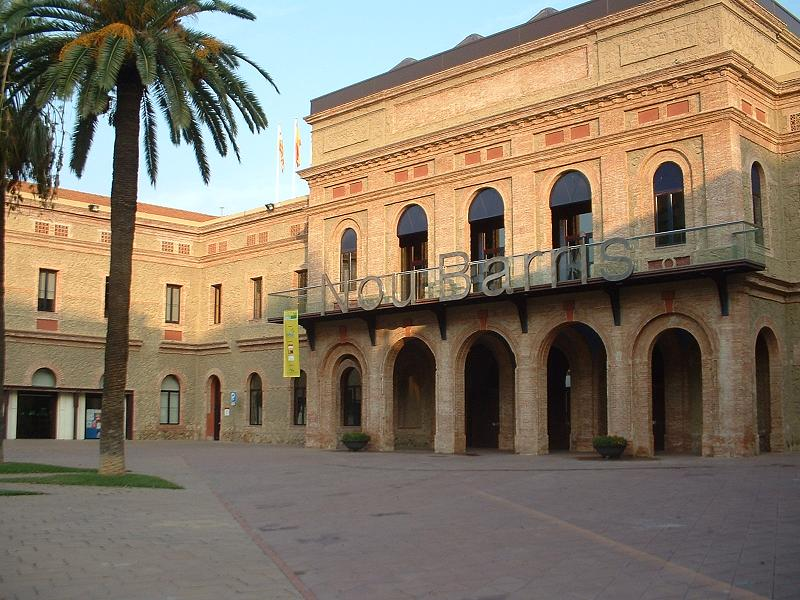
Local government of Nou Barris.

== See also ==
- History of Barcelona
- Urban planning of Barcelona
- Street names in Barcelona
- Former municipalities of Barcelona
