= La Prosperitat =

Coordinates: 41°26′33.58″N 2°10′54.07″E

- Neighborhood of Barcelona
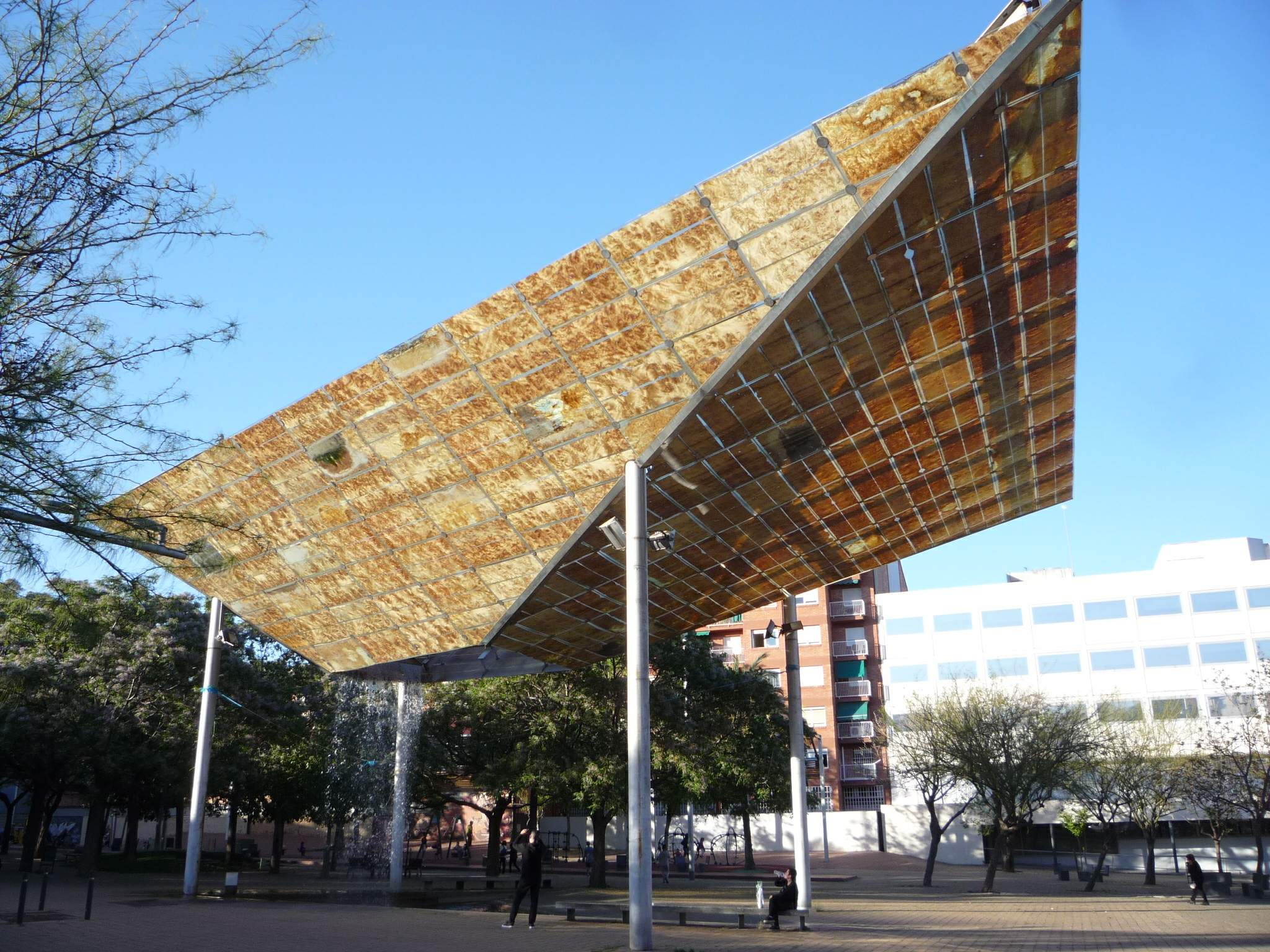
- Plaça Harry Walker fountain
- Interactive map of La Prosperitat
- Country: Spain
- Autonomous community: Catalonia
- Province: Barcelona
- Comarca: Barcelonès
- Municipality: Barcelona
- District: Nou Barris

Area
  - Total: 0.595 km^{2} (0.230 sq mi)

Population
  - Total: 26,166
  - Density: 44,000/km^{2} (114,000/sq mi)

La Prosperitat (Catalan pronunciation: [lə pɾuspəɾiˈtat]) is a neighborhood in the Nou Barris district of Barcelona, Catalonia (Spain).
