= Barcelonès =

Coordinates: 41°24′16″N 2°09′39″E

- Comarca
- Country: Spain
- Autonomous community: Catalonia
- Province: Barcelona
- Region: Àmbit metropolità de Barcelona
- Capital: Barcelona
- Municipalities: List: Badalona, Barcelona, L'Hospitalet de Llobregat, Sant Adrià de Besòs, Santa Coloma de Gramenet

Area
  - Total: 145.9 km^{2} (56.3 sq mi)

Population (2023)
  - Total: 2,313,975
  - Density: 15,860/km^{2} (41,080/sq mi)
- Demonyms: barceloní (m.) barcelonina (f.)
- Time zone: UTC+1 (CET)
  - Summer (DST): UTC+2 (CEST)
- Largest municipality: Barcelona
- Website: barcelones.cat

Barcelonès (Catalan pronunciation: [bəɾsəluˈnɛs]) is the most populated comarca of Catalonia, Spain. It contains Barcelona, which is the capital of Catalonia and of the comarca itself, and four adjacent inner suburbs.

Notwithstanding, the comarca does not have a governing comarcal council; it was dissolved in 2019. Its functions had been and are superseded by the Metropolitan Council of the Barcelona Metropolitan Area (AMB), which include representatives from municipalities further outside the comarca itself. All combined, Barcelonès municipalities send 39 councilors out of the Metropolitan Council's 90, making up more than 43% of the council voting power.

== Municipalities ==

Municipality	Population (2023)	Area km^{2}
Badalona	224,301	21.2
Barcelona	1,655,956	101.4
L'Hospitalet de Llobregat	276,617	12.4
Sant Adrià de Besòs	37,906	3.8
Santa Coloma de Gramenet	119,195	7.0
• Total: 5	2,313,975	145.8
