= List of libraries in Barcelona =

This is a list of public and private libraries in Barcelona (Catalonia, Spain).

== Public libraries owned by the Diputació de Barcelona ==
Name	Locality	District	Opened	Named after	Transport links
Arús	Fort Pienc	Eixample	1895	Founder, freethinker and philanthropist Rossend Arús.	Arc de Triomf Tetuan
Barceloneta - La Fraternitat	Barceloneta	Ciutat Vella	2001	Former worker cooperative La Fraternitat	Barceloneta
Bon Pastor	Bon Pastor	Sant Andreu	2004	The neighbourhood's name	Bon Pastor
Camp de l'Arpa - Caterina Albert	Camp de l'Arpa	Sant Martí		Writer Caterina Albert, also known as Víctor Català	Camp de l'Arpa
Can Rosés	Les Corts	Les Corts	1993	The 18th century masia where it's located	Les Corts
Canyelles	Canyelles	Nou Barris	1994	The neighbourhood's name	Canyelles
Clarà	Sarrià	Sarrià-Sant Gervasi	2000	The sculptor Josep Clarà, who used it as his atelier.	Les Tres Torres
Collserola - Josep Miracle	Vallvidrera	Sarrià-Sant Gervasi	2002	The writer Josep Miracle	Peu de Funicular
El Carmel - Juan Marsé	El Carmel	Horta-Guinardó	2003	The writer Juan Marsé	El Carmel
El Clot - Josep Benet	Glòries-El Clot	Sant Martí	2014	Politician and historian Josep Benet	Glòries
Esquerra de l'Eixample - Agustí Centelles	La Nova Esquerra de l'Eixample	Eixample	2011	The photographer Agustí Centelles	Urgell
Fort Pienc	Fort Pienc	Eixample	2003	A former military citadel called Fort Pienc.	Marina
Francesc Candel	La Marina del Prat Vermell	Sants-Montjuïc	2006	Writer and journalist Francesc Candel	Magòria-La Campana
Francesca Bonnemaison	Sant Pere, Santa Caterina i la Ribera	Ciutat Vella	1909	Francesca Bonnemaison, founder of the first women's library in Europe.	Urquinaona
Gòtic - Andreu Nin	Barri Gòtic	Ciutat Vella	2011	Murdered Communist revolutionary Andreu Nin	Drassanes
Ignasi Iglésias - Can Fabra	Sant Andreu de Palomar	Sant Andreu	1935	Writer Ignasi Iglésias, and the former factory Can Fabra.	Sant Andreu
Lola Anglada	La Nova Esquerra de l'Eixample	Eixample		Writer and illustrator Lola Anglada	Entença
Guinardó - Mercè Rodoreda	El Guinardó	Horta-Guinardó	1999	Writer Mercè Rodoreda	Alfons X
Horta - Can Mariner	Horta	Horta-Guinardó	2008	11th century masia Can Mariner.	Horta
Jaume Fuster	Vallcarca	Gràcia	2005	Writer and politician Jaume Fuster.	Lesseps
La Sagrera - Marina Clotet	La Sagrera	Sant Andreu	2009	Seamstress and popular culture figure Marina Clotet	La Sagrera
Les Corts - Miquel Llongueras	Les Corts	District of Les Corts	2000	Politician Miquel Llongueras	Collblanc
Les Roquetes	Roquetes	Nou Barris	2008	The neighbourhood's name	Roquetes
Montbau - Albert Pérez Baró	Montbau	Nou Barris	2001	Albert Pérez Baró, Spanish cooperative movement theorist.	Via Júlia
Nou Barris	La Guineueta	Nou Barris	2001	The district's name	Llucmajor
Poblenou - Manuel Arranz	Poblenou	Sant Martí	1994	Historian and academician Manuel Arranz.	Poblenou
Poble-sec - Francesc Boix	Poble-sec	Sants-Montjuïc	2000	Photographer and anti-fascist Francesc Boix.	Paral·lel
Ramon d'Alòs-Moner	El Besòs i el Maresme	Sant Martí	1970	Cultural history scholar Ramon d'Alòs-Moner.	Besòs-Mar
Sagrada Família	Sagrada Família	Eixample		Named after the neighbourhood and the temple of Sagrada Família	Sagrada Família
Sant Antoni - Joan Oliver	Sant Antoni	Eixample	2007	The writer Joan Oliver	Sant Antoni
Sant Martí de Provençals	Sant Martí de Provençals	Sant Martí	1983	The neighbourhood's name.	Sant Martí
Sant Pau-Santa Creu	El Raval	Ciutat Vella	1975	The former Hospital de la Santa Creu de Barcelona, which hosts other cultural institutions.	Liceu
Sofia Barat	Dreta de l'Eixample	Eixample	1971	Catholic saint Madeleine Sophie Barat	Girona
Torre Llobeta	Vilapicina i la Torre Llobeta	Nou Barris	2011	The 15th century masia which hosts it.	Maragall
Vapor Vell	Sants	Sants-Montjuïc	2000	Former factory El Vapor Vell	Plaça de Sants
Vila de Gràcia	Vila de Gràcia	Gràcia	2002	The former municipality.	Joanic
Xavier Benguerel	Vila Olímpica	Sant Martí	1995	The writer and translator Xavier Benguerel	Marina
Zona Nord	Ciutat Meridiana	Nou Barris	2009	Geographic location within the city.	Torre Baró

== Public libraries belonging to other institutions ==
Name	Locality	District
Biblioteca d'Autors Catalans	L'Antiga Esquerra de l'Eixample	Eixample
Biblioteca Pública Episcopal de Barcelona	L'Antiga Esquerra de l'Eixample	Eixample
Filmoteca de Catalunya	El Raval	Ciutat Vella
Library of the Catalan Parliament	Sant Pere, Santa Caterina i la Ribera	Ciutat Vella
National Library of Catalonia	El Raval	Ciutat Vella
Reial Acadèmia Catalana de Belles Arts de Sant Jordi	Sant Pere, Santa Caterina i la Ribera	Ciutat Vella

== Privately owned libraries ==
Name	Locality	District
Ateneu Barcelonès	Barri Gòtic	Ciutat Vella
Col·legi d'Advocats de Barcelona	Dreta de l'Eixample	Eixample
Fundació Antoni Tàpies	L'Antiga Esquerra de l'Eixample	Eixample
Fundació Joan Miró	Montjuïc	Sants-Montjuïc
Institut Amatller d'Art Hispànic	Dreta de l'Eixample	Eixample
MACBA Study Center	El Raval	Ciutat Vella

== Libraries in the metropolitan area ==
=== Cornellà de Llobregat ===
Name	Locality	District	Opened	Named after	Transport links
Central	La Gavarra	IV	1996	The municipality's main library. Formerly known as Biblioteca Popular Joan Maragall.	Gavarra Ignasi Iglesias
Marta Mata	Riera	I	1999	Pedagogist and politician Marta Mata i Garriga. Former Titan cinema.	Cornellà-Riera Les Aigües
Sant Ildefons	Sant Ildefons	V	2013	Name of the district in which it's located.	Sant Ildefons

=== L'Hospitalet de Llobregat ===
Name	Locality	District	Opened	Named after	Transport links
Bellvitge	Bellvitge	VI	1972	The district in which it's located.	Bellvitge
Can Sumarro	Centre	I	1983	A 16th century masia in the area.	Rambla Just Oliveras
Josep Janés	Collblanc	II	2002	A local poet and editor.	Collblanc Santa Eulàlia
La Bòbila	Pubilla Cases	V	1999	A cultural venue and a former factory.	Santa Eulàlia
La Florida	La Florida	IV	2001	The district in which it's located.	Florida
Plaça Europa	Granvia l'Hospitalet	2010	Plaça d'Europa	Europa-Fira	
Santa Eulàlia	Santa Eulàlia	III	1970	The district in which it's located.	Santa Eulàlia
Tecla Sala	La Torrassa	II	2000	Cultural centre of the same name, and ultimately, industrialist Tecla Sala.	Torrassa

== See also ==
- List of libraries in Spain
- Culture in Barcelona
- List of markets in Barcelona
- List of theatres and concert halls in Barcelona
- List of museums in Barcelona
- Books in Spain
- Open access in Spain to scholarly communication
