= Travessera de Dalt =

Coordinates: 41.4092°N 2.1542°E

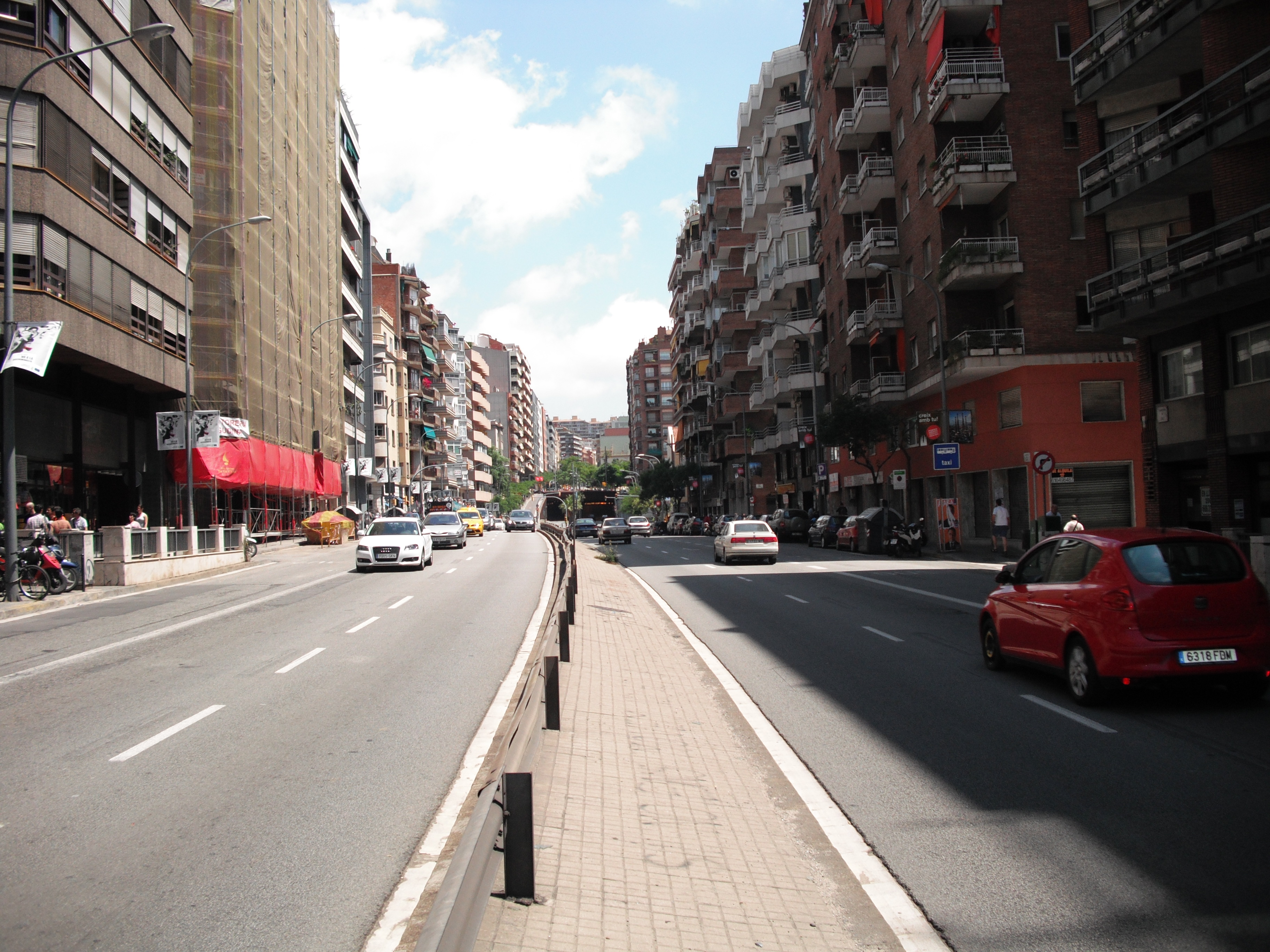
Travessera de Dalt as seen from a car, looking towards Plaça Sanllehy and El Guinardó.

Travessera de Dalt is an important and much-used street in Barcelona (Catalonia, Spain). It spans a good deal of the city's district of Gràcia, starting at the tunnel entrances at Plaça de Lesseps, and running towards the tunnels system near Plaça Sanllehy, where it changes name and merges into Ronda del Guinardó. It's formally part of the ring road Ronda del Mig, which splits into several smaller roads.

Its historical origin is a major road which linked the road to Sant Pere de Ribes with the Madrid royal road, bypassing the city of Barcelona, which at the time was much smaller than it is today, pretty much the area of the present day Ciutat Vella. Its current name was decreed by law on January 1 1900. Travessera de Dalt is nowadays also an administrative divide for the Gràcia district. South of it lies the central Vila de Gràcia neighbourhood, as well as El Camp d'en Grassot i Gràcia Nova. To the north are Vallcarca i els Penitents and La Salut.

== Transport ==
The metro station Lesseps, on line L3 is located at one of its ends. Station Alfons X is not far from Travessera de Dalt's other end. When construction of L9 and L10 has been completed the area will be served by both lines, including Lesseps and the future station Sanllehy.
