= Ronda del Guinardó, Barcelona =

Ronda del Guinardó is one of the rondes of Barcelona, somewhere between an inner ring road and a district avenue crossing Guinardó, in the Horta-Guinardó district of Barcelona.

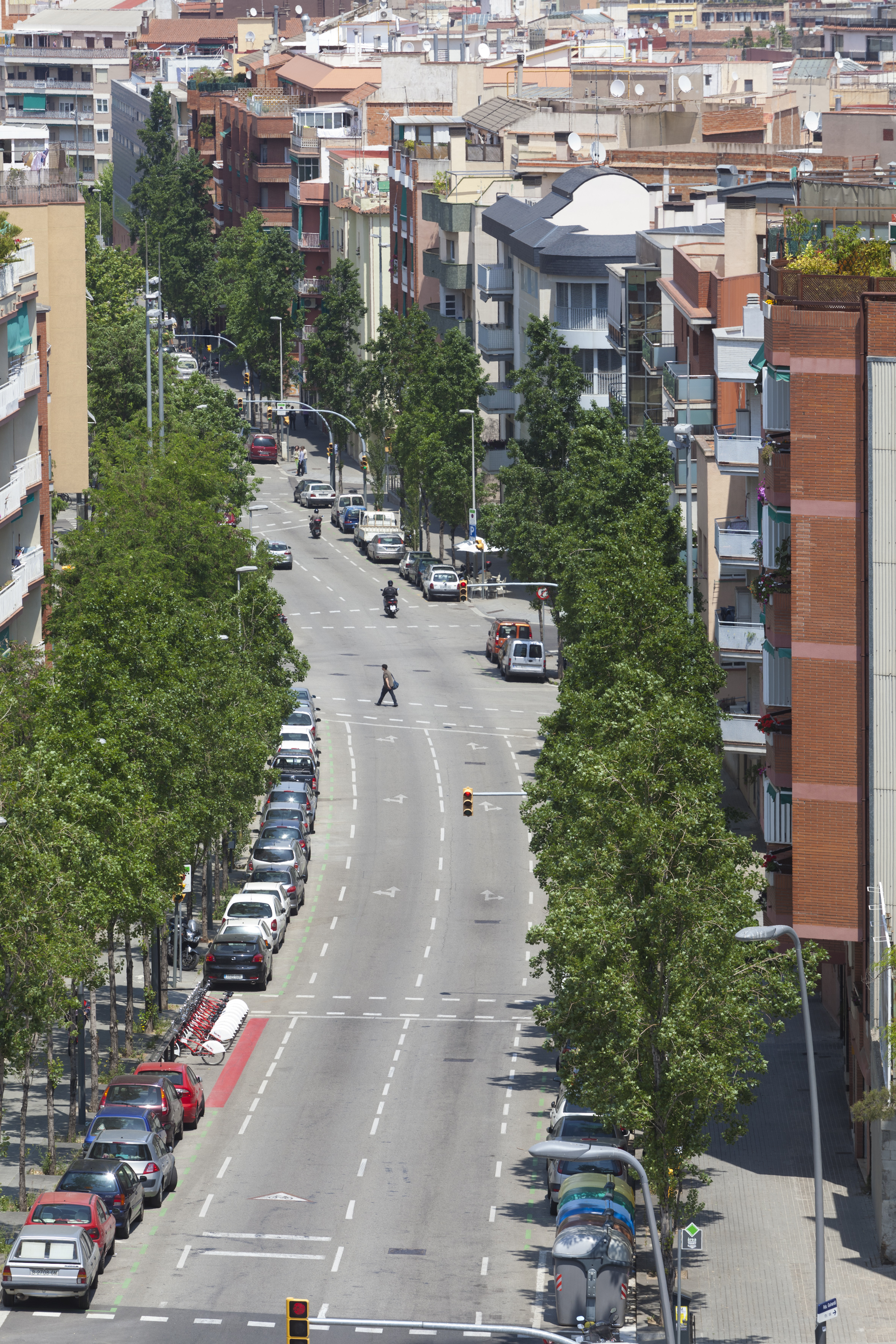
A photo of a Historical Routes at the Horta-Guinardó District Administration in Barcelona

Basically the same thoroughfare as Travessera de Dalt, or an extension of it, it becomes Ronda del Guinardó around Plaça d'Alfons el Savi. It cuts Guinardó in half and ends at Plaça de Maragall. The other major avenue in the area is Avinguda de la Mare de Déu de Montserrat, not far from it but further north.

== See also ==
- List of streets and squares in Horta-Guinardó

== Barcelona Metro ==
- Alfons X (L4)
- Guinardó (L4)
- Maragall (L4, L5)
