= Maragall =

Maragall (Eastern Catalan: [məɾəˈɣaʎ]) is a surname of Catalan origin. It may refer to:

- Joan Maragall - a Catalan poet
- Elisabeth Maragall - a Spanish field hockey player
- Ernest Maragall - a Catalan politician
- Pasqual Maragall - a Catalan politician, the 127th President of Generalitat de Catalunya
- Maragall (Barcelona Metro) - a station of Barcelona metro (Spain)
