= Jordi Torremadé Martínez =

Spanish athlete (1923–1990)

- Born: January 9, 1923, Barcelona (Spain)
- Died: November 2, 1990 (age 67)
- Occupation: Athlete

Jordi Torremadé Martínez (January 9, 1923 – November 2, 1990) was an athlete who transitioned in 1941 and broke Spanish athletics women's records, where he had no rival at the time. His performances were later invalidated due to his gender transition.

Torremadé was born in the Guinardó neighborhood. No one realized he had Morris syndrome, an intersex condition, so he was raised as a girl and lived as a woman until the age of 19, when he transitioned.

Before his transition, he began to stand out in various sports, which allowed him to escape from his particular situation. Although he did not know what was happening to him, he did not feel like a woman.

He played basketball with the Club Deportivo Laietà and was a field hockey goalkeeper with SEU. He triumphed above all in athletics with the Real Club Deportiu Espanyol, where he was even received by Lluís Companys.

During 1940 and 1941, he shattered several women's records – Catalan, Spanish, and even the European 60-meter dash record, approaching the world best at the time. His records included: cross-country, 60 m, 100 m, 200 m, 800 m, 4x100 m relay, high jump, and long jump.

In 1942, at age 19, he changed his name in the Civil Registry to Jordi after undergoing gender-affirming surgery. His athletics career was cut short, and his records were erased from official listings.

On February 13, 1942, the Madrid tabloid Informaciones exposed his gender transition. The resulting scandal led the Sección Femenina to ban women’s athletics in Spain for more than 20 years, claiming that sport masculinized women and diverted them from their “natural function,” motherhood. A 1943 decree was explicit: Spanish women would "only practice sports that did not interfere with their specific role: motherhood.” In 1963, following public protests, women’s athletics was reinstated.

On August 5, 1952, he married Catalina Pons Bofill against his father’s will, which led to his disinheritance. In 1959, he moved to Paris, where he worked at a multinational company. He later returned to Barcelona, where he lived until his death from heart disease at age 67.

He appeared on several programs, such as Angel Casas Show (TVE2) (June 19, 1984) and La vida en un chip (TV3), where he shared his personal story. His life was also featured in various media outlets, especially the sports press.
