= Kostka College, Barcelona =

Coordinates: 41°24′52.6″N 2°9′23.13″E

- Col.legi Sant Estanislau de Kostka, Gràcia, Barcelona
- Gràcia, Barcelona, Spain

Information
- Type: Jesuit, Catholic
- Established: 1939; 87 years ago
- Staff: 180 teachers
- Grades: K through baccalaureate
- Gender: Coeducational
- Enrollment: 1,395
- Website: Kostka College

Kostka College, Barcelona, Spain, was established in 1939 and became a work of the Jesuit Educational Foundation in 2012. It is currently situated in the Gràcia neighborhood of Barcelona, and includes classes from kindergarten through baccalaureate.

The school was founded in 1939, in Roger de Llúria in Barcelona. In 1984 it moved to its current location at the top of Gràcia. The school was under the patronage of the Association of Culture and Work (1977-1994) then under the Foundation Moré de Mora (1995-2010), and finally joined the Jesuit Educational Foundation in 2012.

== See also ==
- List of Jesuit sites
