= Maragall station =

Metro station in Barcelona, Spain

Maragall
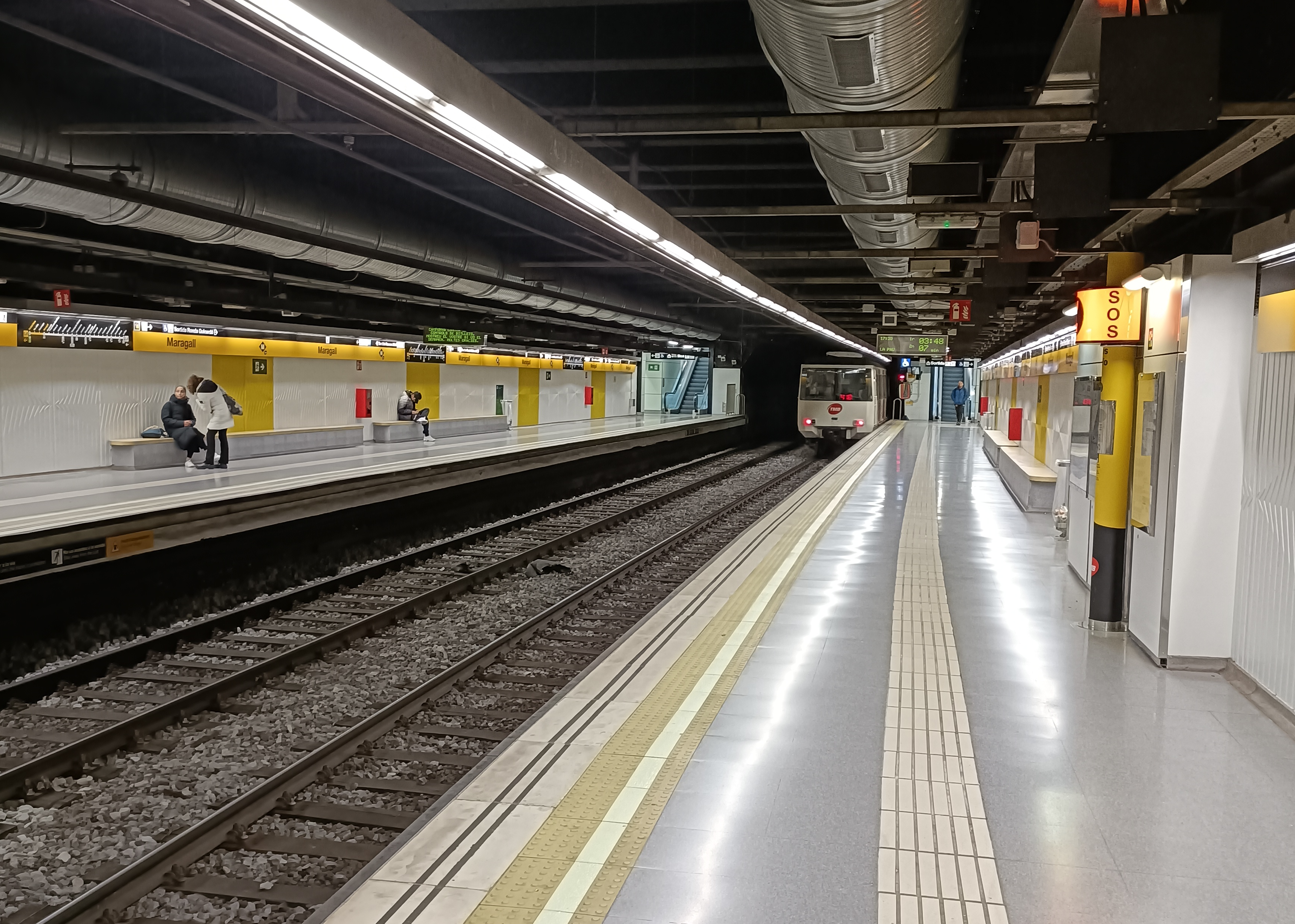
- Platforms of Line 4

General information
- Location: Barcelona (Nou Barris, Horta-Guinardó, Sant Andreu)
- Coordinates: 41.424°N 2.178°E
- System: Barcelona Metro rapid transit station
- Operator: Transports Metropolitans de Barcelona

Other information
- Fare zone: 1 (ATM)

History
- Opened: 1959 (Line 5); 1982 (Line 4)

Services
Preceding station	Metro	Following station
Llucmajor towards Trinitat Nova	L4	Guinardó | Hospital de Sant Pau towards La Pau
Preceding station	Metro	Following station
Congrés towards Cornellà Centre	L5	Virrei Amat towards Vall d'Hebron
Location
- Location within Barcelona

Maragall (Catalan pronunciation: [məɾəˈɣaʎ]) is a station in the Barcelona Metro network located at the meeting point of three different districts in Passeig de Maragall, Barcelona. It is an important interchange station between Line 4 and Line 5.

Between 2020 and 2024, Maragall underwent major works to make the station fully accessible to persons with reduced mobility, with elevators being installed and the removal of stairs in the station's connection corridor.

== Location ==
The station received its name from the Passeig de Maragall, which is named after the Catalan poet Joan Maragall.

The station is located in an area historically known as Els Quinze. It was named after the 15 cent fare a trip between Urquinaona and Torre Llobeta would cost on the old tramway line to Horta. Nowadays, the area is the meeting point of several major streets, including Passeig de Maragall, Ronda del Guinardó, Avinguda de la Mare de Déu de Montserrat and Avinguda dels Quinze.

The area is also the meeting point of three districts of Barcelona; Horta-Guinardó, Nou Barris and Sant Andreu de Palomar. The three neighborhoods of each of these districts that meet at Maragall are El Guinardó, Vilapicina i la Torre Llobeta and El Congrés i els Indians.

The Line 4 station is located underground below Ronda del Guinardó, between the streets of Lluís Sagnier and Segle XX. The station has two accesses, one on each sidewalk of Ronda del Guinardó, close to the intersection with Carrer del Segle XX. On the other side of the station, an underground transfer corridor allows connection to the Line 5 station.

The Line 5 station is located underground below Passeig de Maragall, between the streets of Mascaró and Varsòvia. The station has two lobbies and three different accesses. The southern lobby features one access at the intersection of Passeig de Maragall and Ramon Albó and the connection corridor to Line 4. The northern lobby features two accesses at the intersection between Passeig de Maragall and Avinguda dels Quinze.

== History ==
The Line 5 station was opened in 1959 (67 years ago), as the line's section between Sagrera and Vilapicina became operational.

The Line 4 station opened in 1982 (44 years ago) as the line was extended between Guinardó and Via Júlia.

Between 2020 and 2024, the station underwent major renovation works. Elevators were installed and stairs were removed in order to make the station fully accessible to persons with reduced mobility.

== Gallery ==
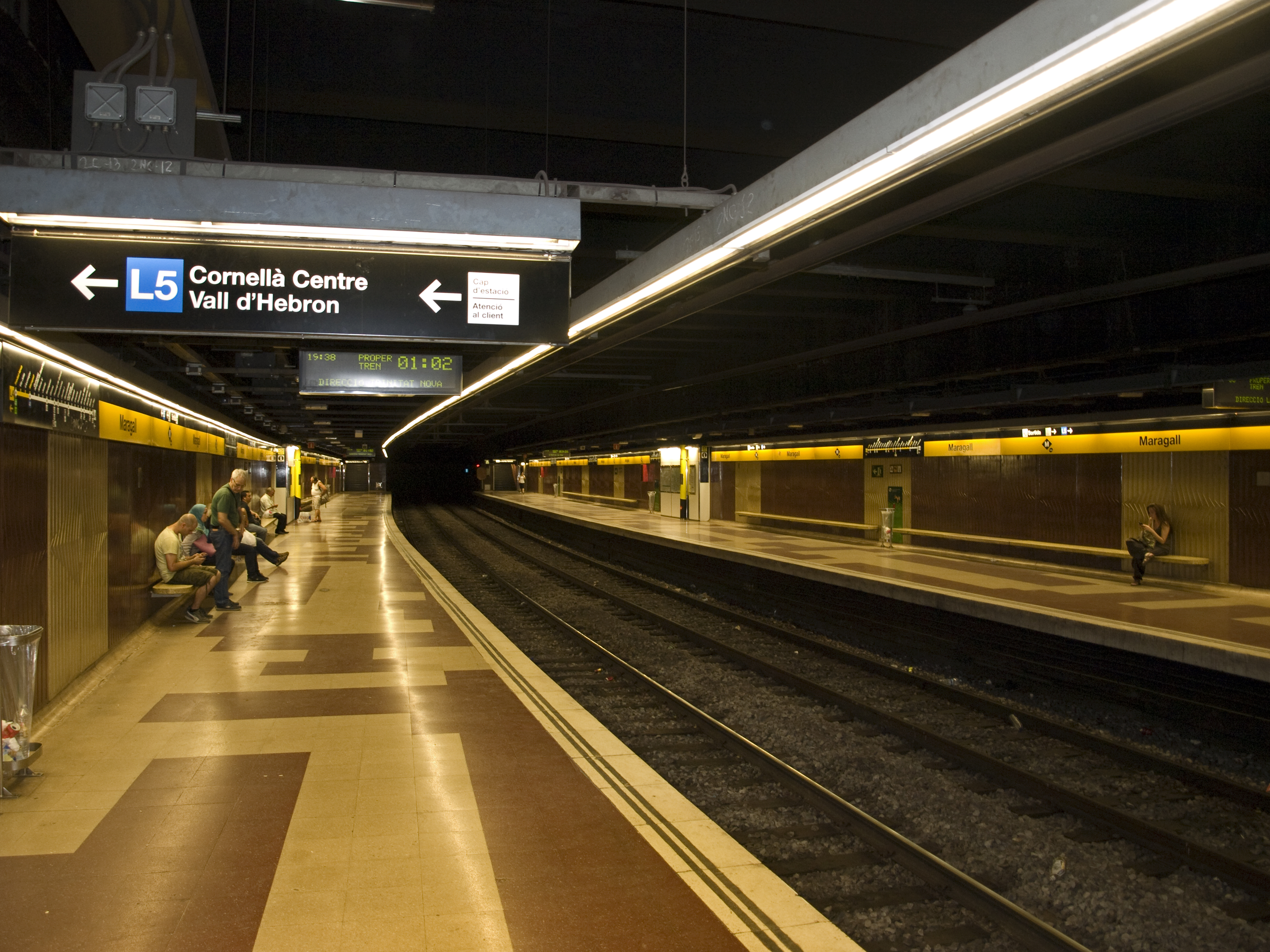
The Line 4 platforms before being renovated

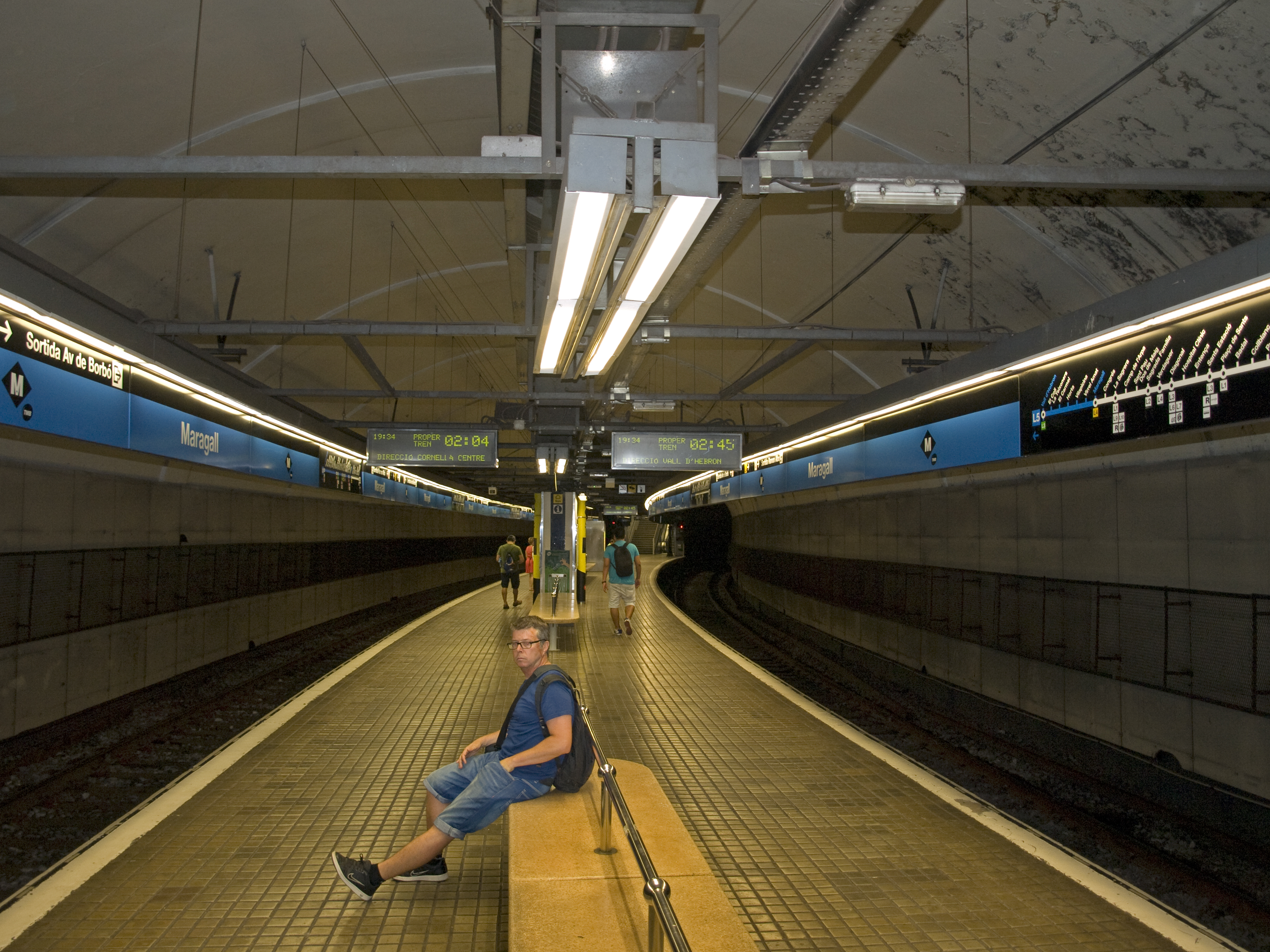
Line 5's island platform

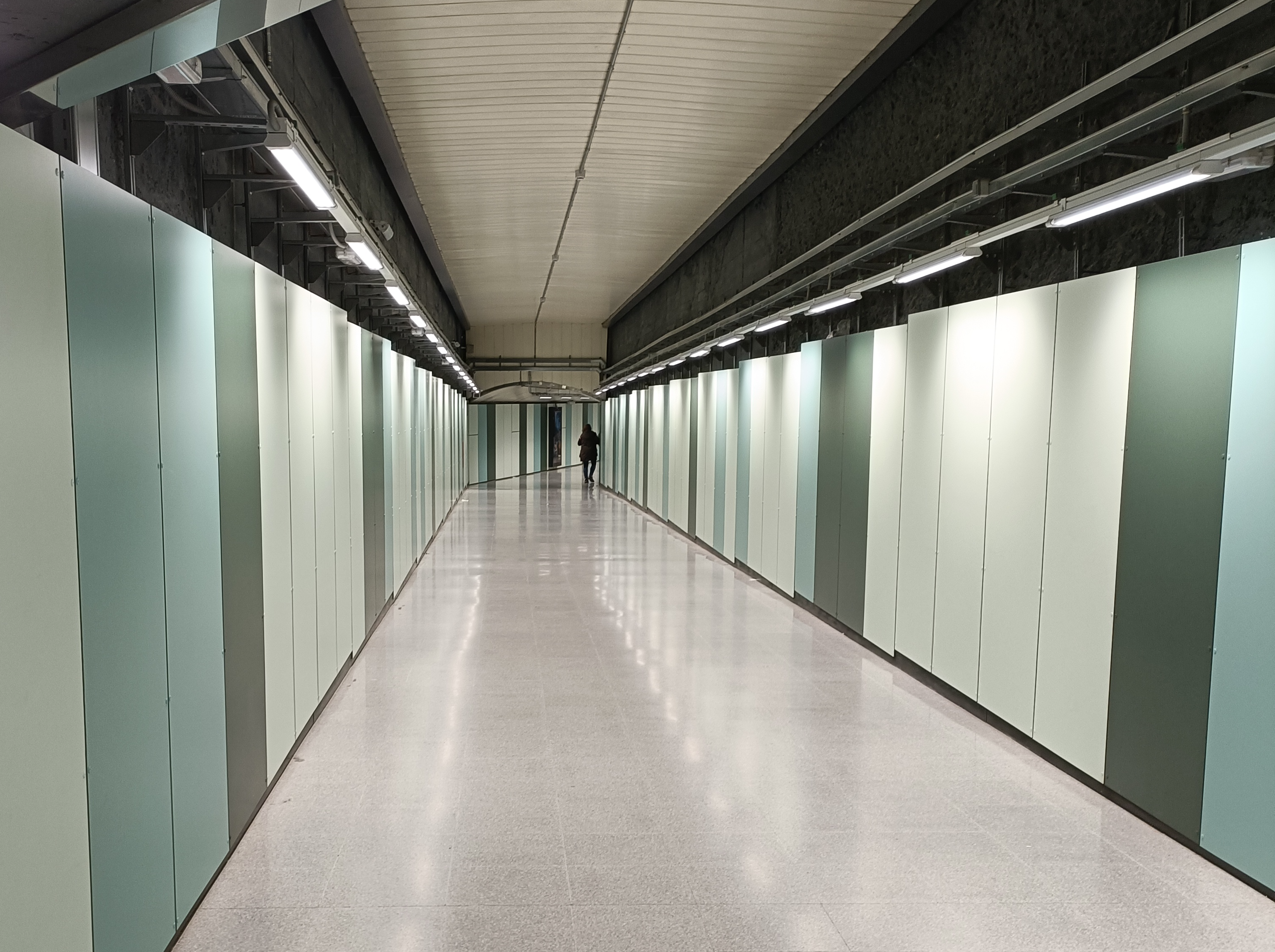
The connection corridor between Line 4 and Line 5

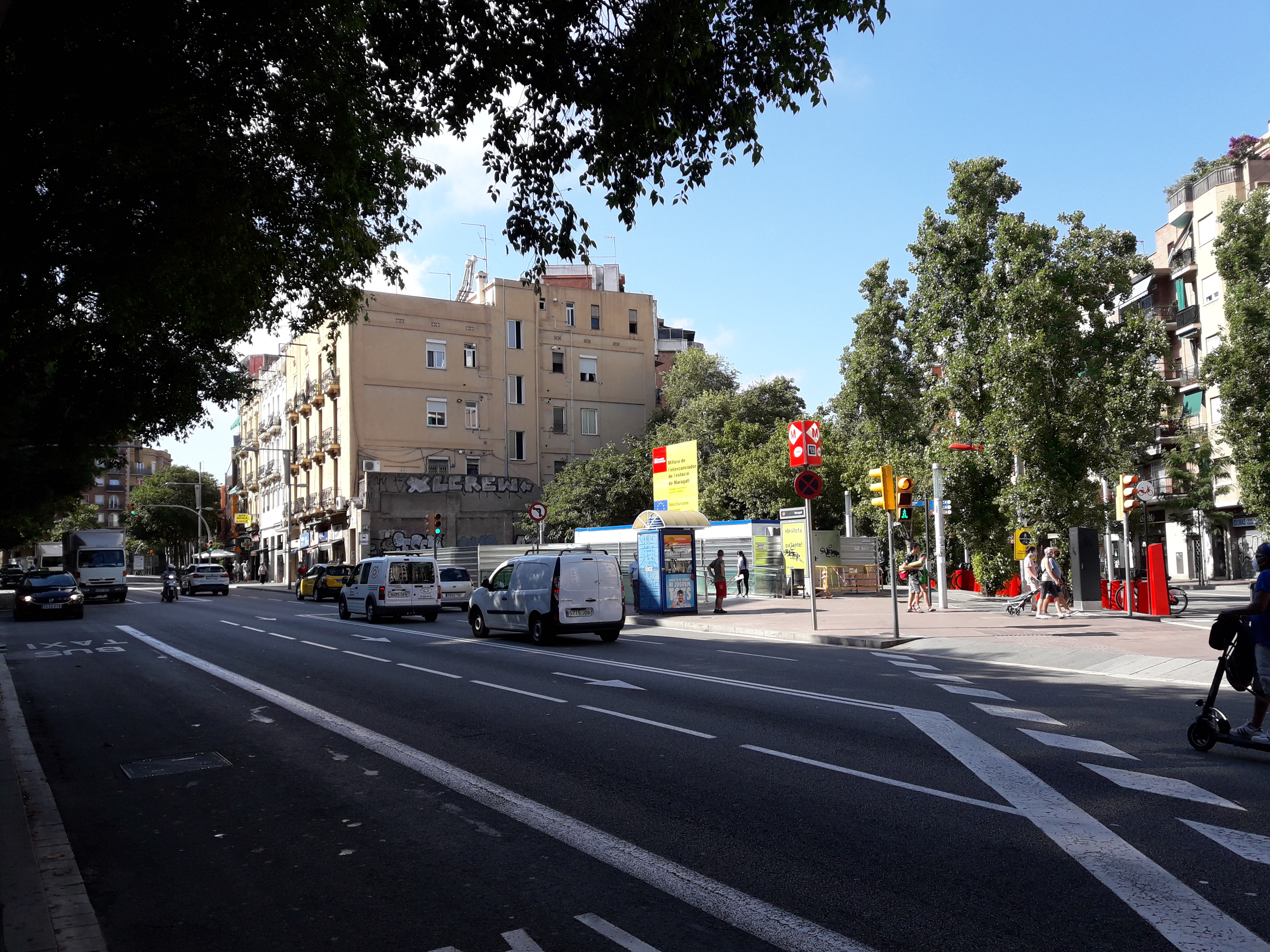
The Passeig de Maragall access during renovation works

== Services ==
Preceding station	Metro	Following station
Llucmajor towards Trinitat Nova	L4	Guinardó | Hospital de Sant Pau towards La Pau
Congrés towards Cornellà Centre	L5	Virrei Amat towards Vall d'Hebron

== See also ==
- List of Barcelona Metro stations
