= Virrei Amat station =

Metro station in Barcelona, Spain

Coordinates: 41°25′49″N 2°10′29″E

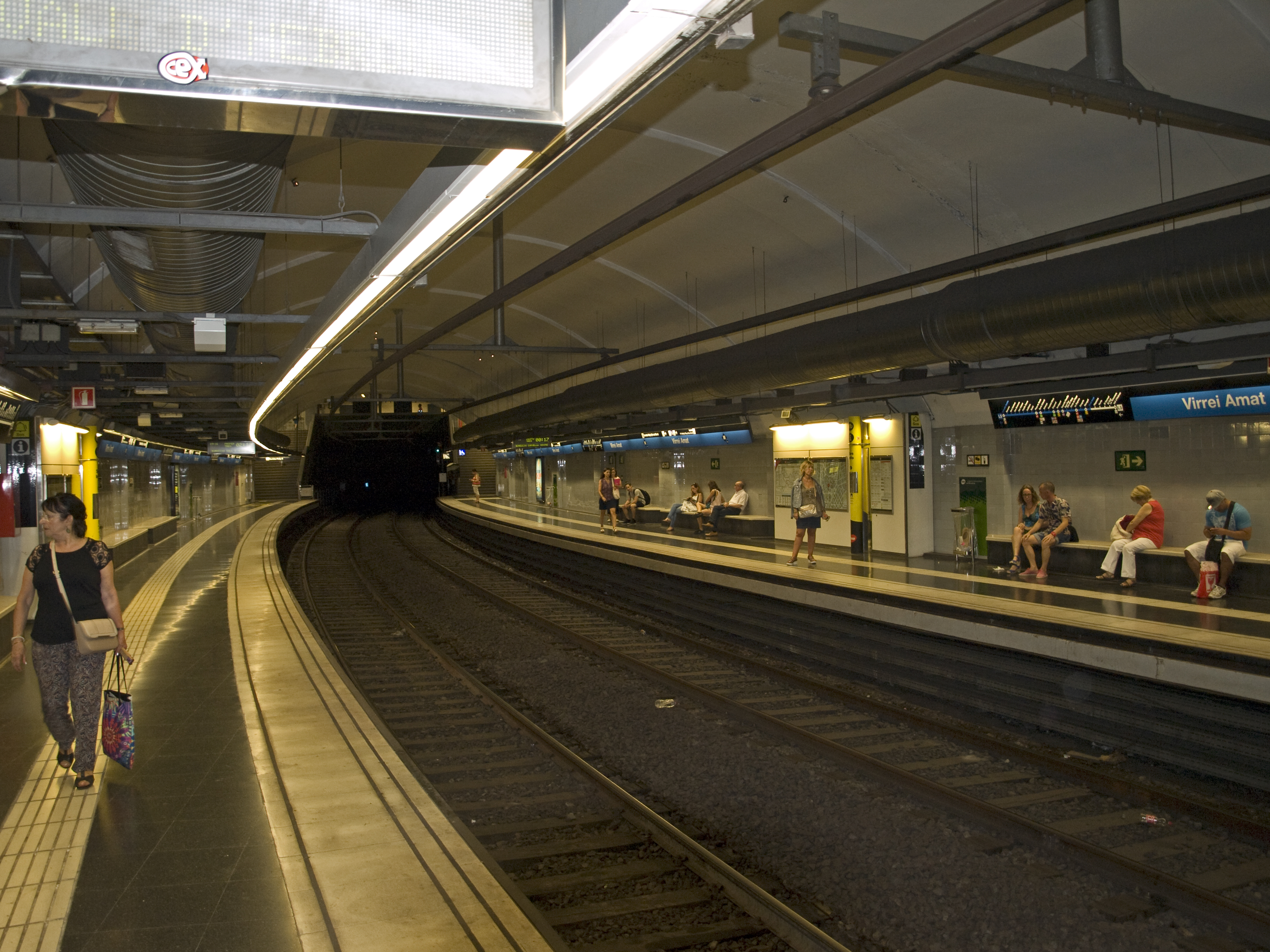
Virrei Amat station platforms

Virrei Amat (Catalan pronunciation: [biˈrej əˈmat]) is a station on line 5 of the Barcelona Metro. The station is located underneath Plaça Virrei Amat, between Carrer Felip II and Carrer Varsòvia. It was opened in 1959. The curved side-platform station has a ticket hall on either end, each with two accesses.

== Services ==
Preceding station	Metro	Following station
Maragall towards Cornellà Centre	L5	Vilapicina towards Vall d'Hebron
