= El Coll =

- Neighborhood of Barcelona
- Interactive map of El Coll
- Country: Spain
- Autonomous community: Catalonia
- Province: Barcelona
- Comarca: Barcelonès
- Municipality: Barcelona
- District: Gràcia

Area
  - Total: 0.358 km^{2} (0.138 sq mi)

Population
  - Total: 7,391
  - Density: 20,600/km^{2} (53,500/sq mi)

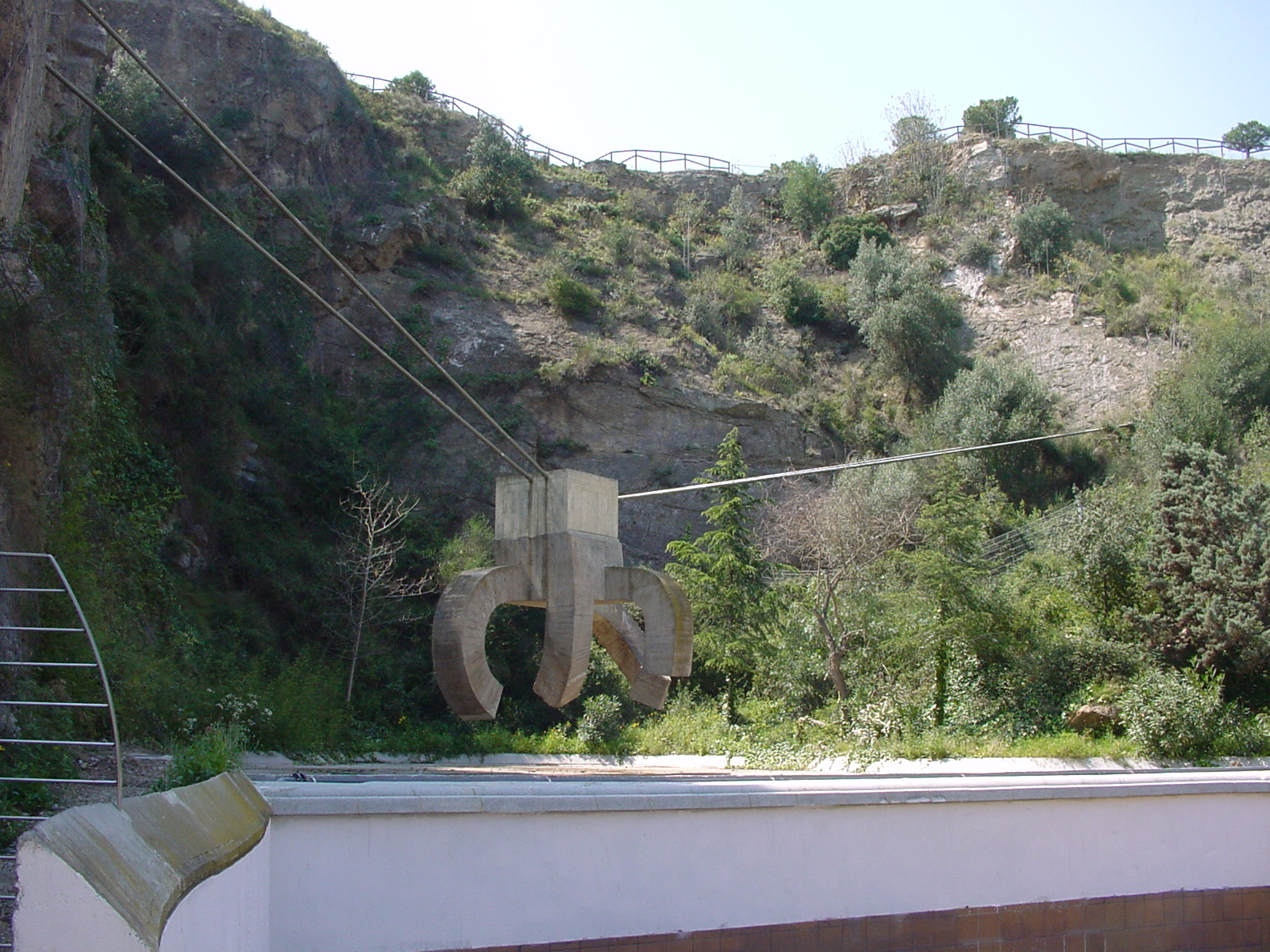
'Elogio del Agua', in the Parc de la Creueta del Coll.

El Coll (Catalan pronunciation: [əl ˈkɔʎ]) is a neighbourhood of Gràcia, one of the 10 districts Barcelona is divided in. Located at the base of Tibidabo hill, it's 300 meters above sea level and is nowadays inhabited by 6,850 people.

== History ==
Its history goes back to the 11th century with the construction of the church that bore its name: Església del Coll.

At the beginning of the 20th century, the neighbourhood was filled with "masies" and houses.

In the 1960s, El Coll saw an urban expansion with the green spaces being replaced by tower blocks.

In 1976 the Parc de la Creueta del Coll was built on the site of "la Creueta", a disused quarry.

== See also ==
- Street names in Barcelona
- Urban planning of Barcelona
