= Francisco Boix =

Spanish photographer and concentration camp survivor (1920–1951)

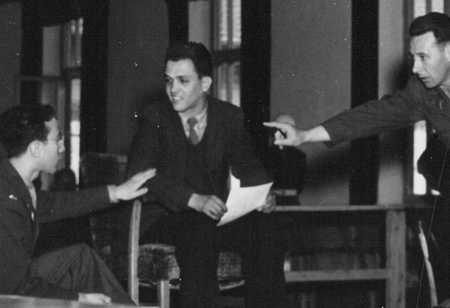
- Boix as a witness in the American trial against 61 German Nazi criminals that took place in Dachau, 1946
- Born: Francisco Boix Campo; August 14, 1920; Barcelona, Spain
- Died: 7 July 1951 (aged 30); Paris, France
- Burial place: Cimetière du Père-Lachaise
- Occupations: Photographer and journalist
- Political party: Juventudes Socialistas Unificadas

Signature
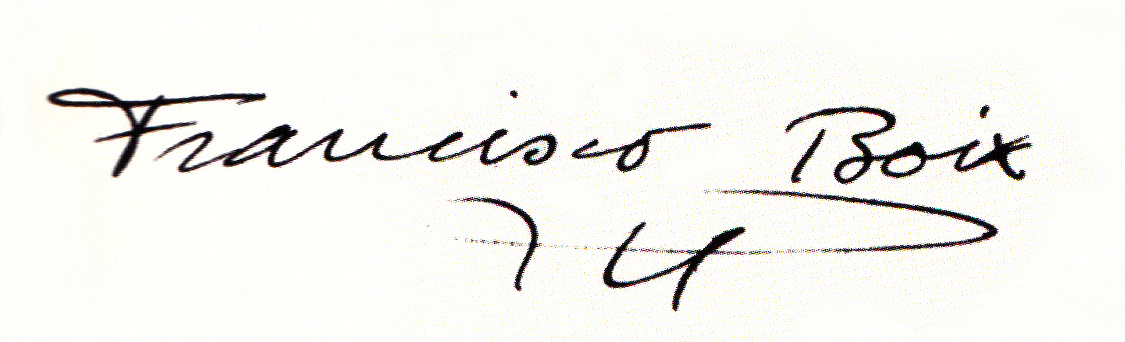

Francisco Boix Campo (14 August 1920 in Barcelona – 7 July 1951 in Paris) was a Spanish veteran of the Spanish Civil War and photographer who was imprisoned in the Mauthausen concentration camp. At both the Nuremberg trials and the Dachau trials he presented photographs that played a role in the conviction of Nazi war criminals.

== Biography ==
Francisco Boix was born on 14 August 1920 in Barcelona. As a Spanish Republican he was exiled in France in 1939. He was recruited by the French Foreign Legion and French Army and captured in 1940 by the Germans. Boix, like over 7,000 Spaniards, was an inmate in the Mauthausen concentration camp between January 1941 and May 1945. From the end of August 1941 he worked in the Erkennungsdienst, the photography department of the camp administration, taking ID photos of inmates and documenting events in the camp. He was able to hide and preserve until liberation about 2,000 negatives taken by the SS head of the department, Paul Ricken, as well as by himself.

On January 28 and 29, 1946, at the Nuremberg trial (International Military Tribunal), Boix was called by the French prosecution to show photographs taken by the SS in Mauthausen. Those photos depicted the conditions in which the prisoners lived and were murdered in that camp. They were also proof that the camp was known and visited by high leaders of the Third Reich, such as Ernst Kaltenbrunner, who appeared visiting both the Mauthausen camp proper, and the Wienergraben quarry adjacent to the camp.

In April 1946 Boix was again a witness, this time in the American military trial that took place in Dachau against 61 accused from the Mauthausen camp. Between 1945 and 1951 Boix worked as a photo reporter in the French press. During that same period he was a member of the French Communist Party.

He died in Paris on 7 July 1951 from kidney failure at age 30.

== Popular culture ==
=== Films ===
Francisco Boix, A Photographer in Hell is a documentary directed by Llorenç Soler and released in 2001. El fotógrafo de Mauthausen is a Spanish film directed by Mar Targarona released on 26 October 2018. Mario Casas plays Francisco Boix.

=== Graphic novel ===
A graphic novel adaptation telling the story of Boix titled Le Photographe de Mauthausen was published in 2017 by Belgian publisher Le Lombard, written by Salva Rubio and drawn by Pedro J. Colombo.

=== Library ===
A Barcelona library in the district of Paral·lel, opened in 2000, bears his name.

== Bibliography ==
- Bermejo, Benito (2002). Francisco Boix, el fotógrafo de Mauthausen. Fotografías de Francisco Boix y de los archivos capturados a los SS de Mauthausen (in Spanish). Barcelona: RBA Libros. ISBN 978-84-7901-847-4. (Biography in Spanish)
  - Bermejo, Benito (2007). Francisco Boix, der Fotograf von Mauthausen (in German). Translated by Judith Moser-Kroiss. Vienna: Bundesministerium für Inneres.
- Graham, Helen. The Spanish civil war. A very short introduction. Oxford University Press. 2005.
