= Congrés station =

Metro station in Barcelona, Spain

Coordinates: 41°25′24″N 2°10′50″E

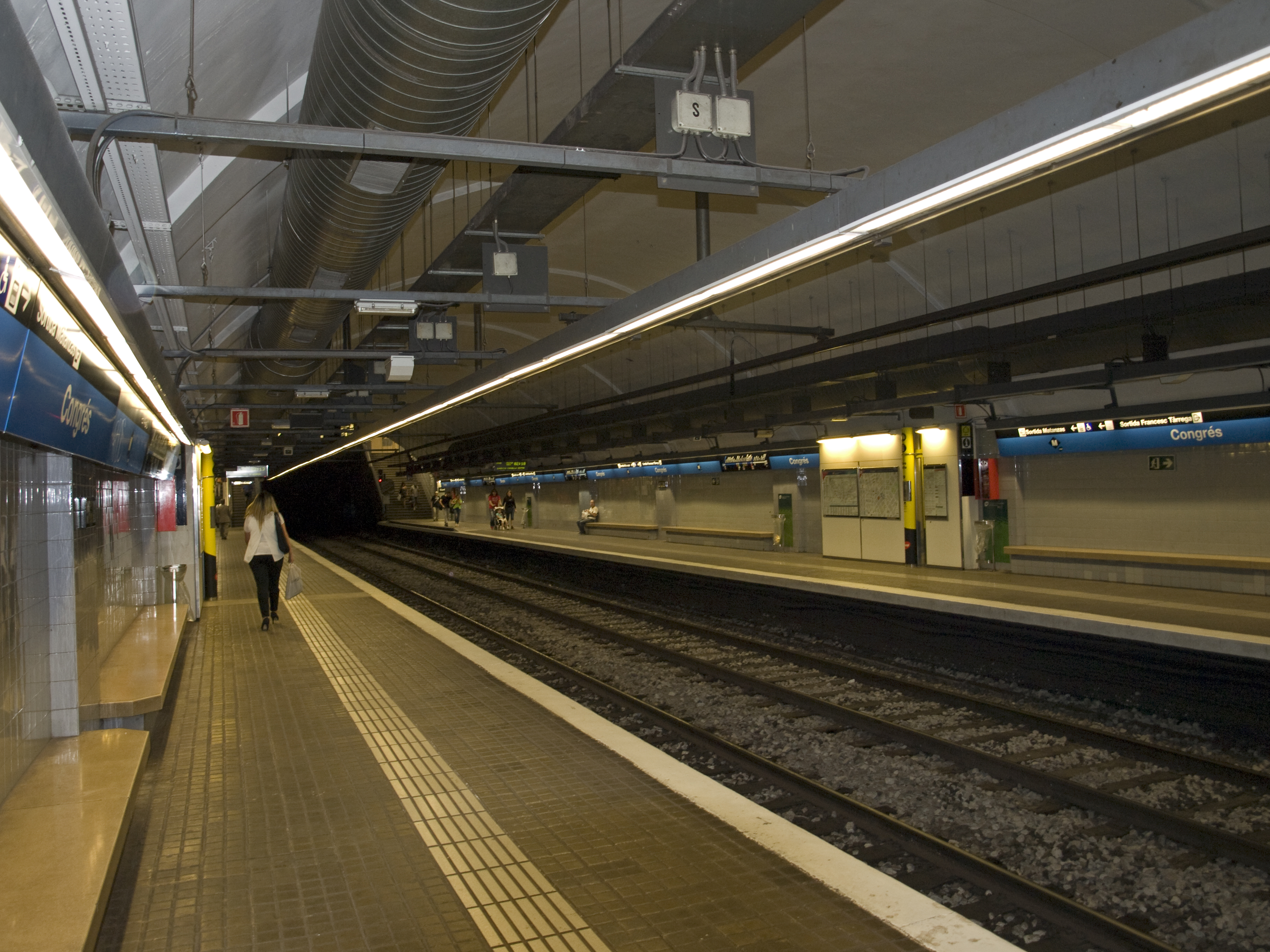
The platforms

Congrés (Catalan pronunciation: [kuŋˈɡɾes]) is a station on line 5 of the Barcelona Metro.

The station is located underneath Carrer Garcilaso, between Carrer Matanzas and Carrer Francesc Tàrrega Claret. It was opened in 1959.

The side-platform station has a ticket hall on either end, each with one access.

== Services ==
Preceding station	Metro	Following station
La Sagrera towards Cornellà Centre	L5	Maragall towards Vall d'Hebron
