= Turó de la Rovira =

Hill in Barcelona, Spain

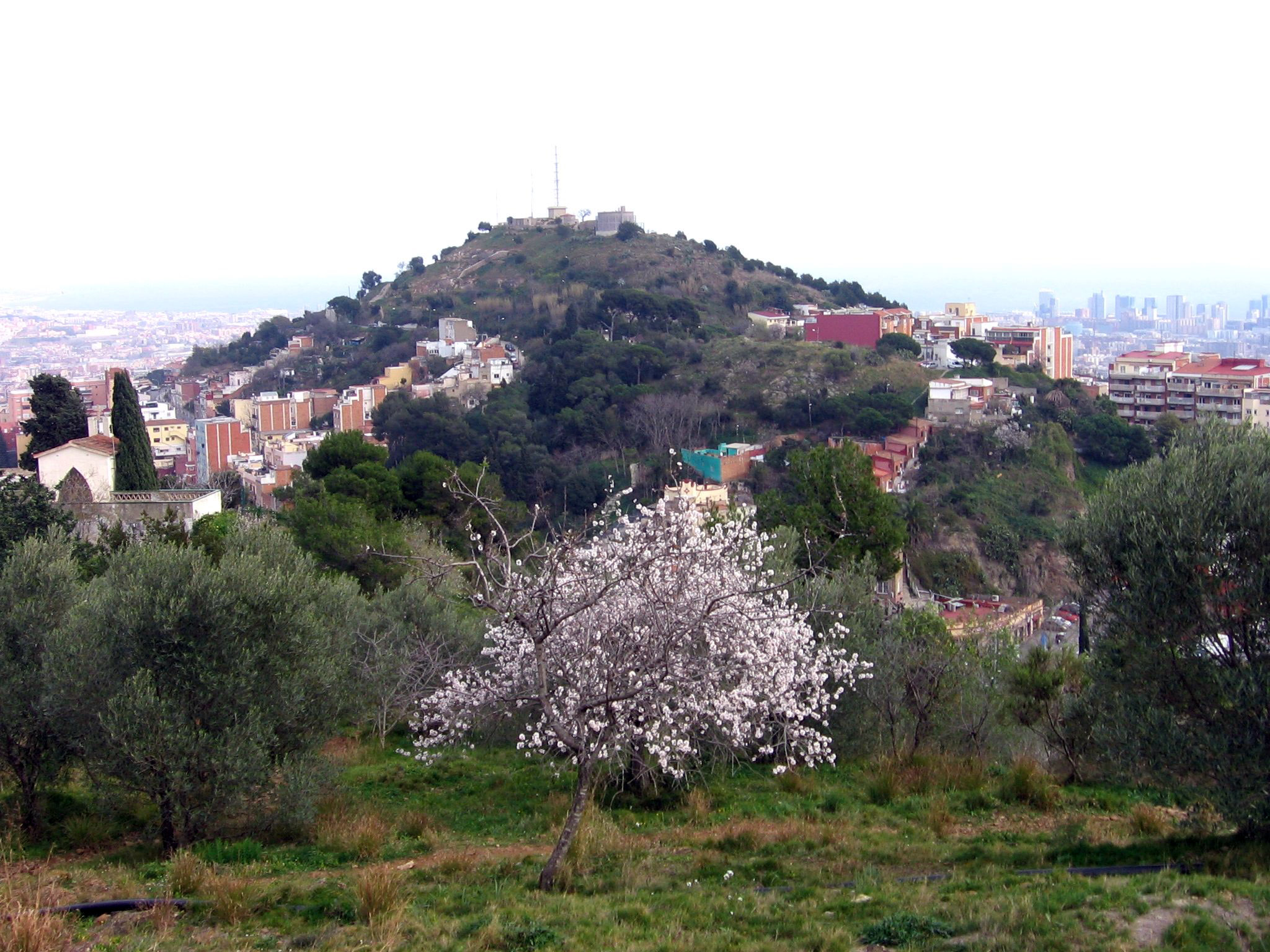
Overview of Turó de la Rovira

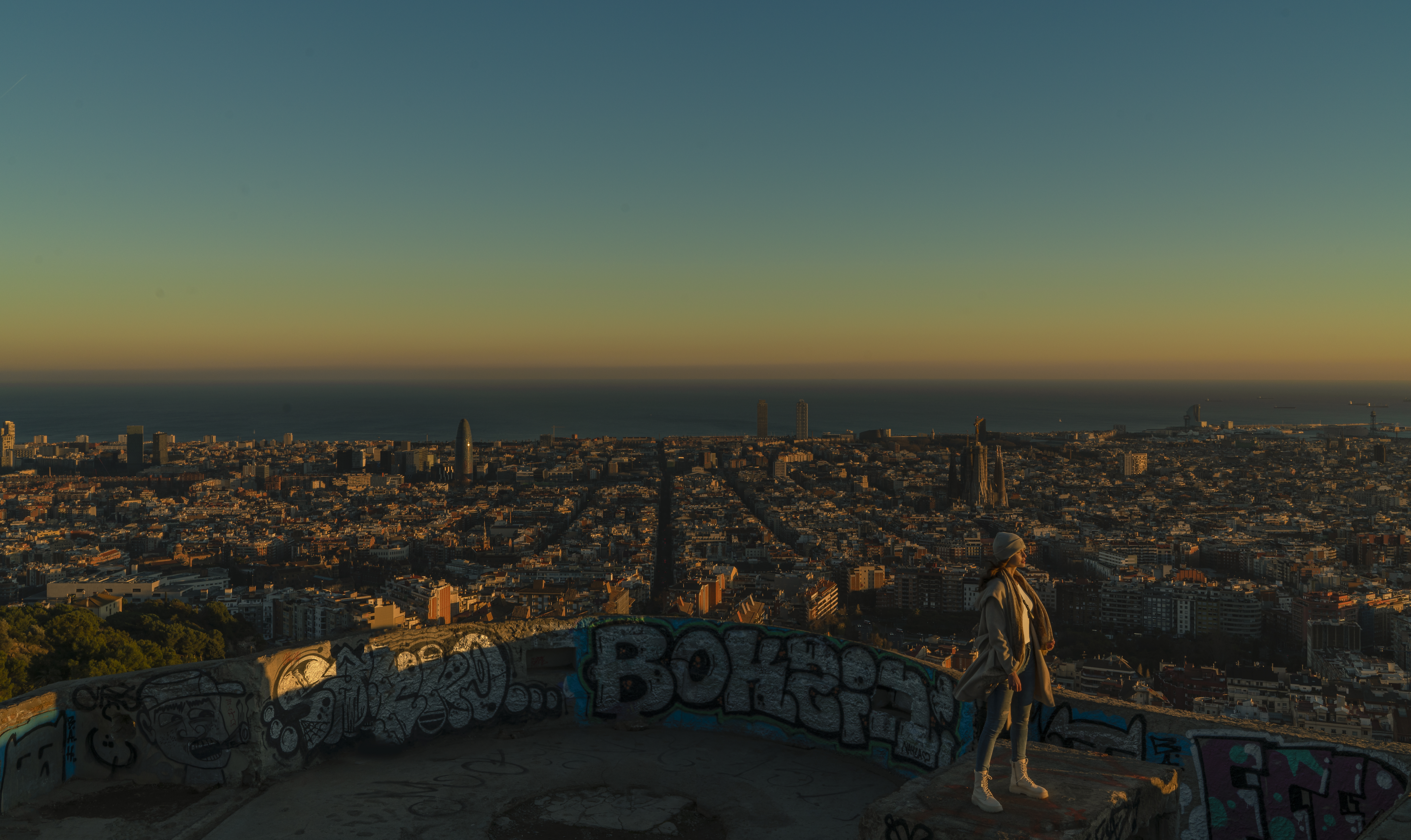
Turó de la Rovira, City Landscape 2021

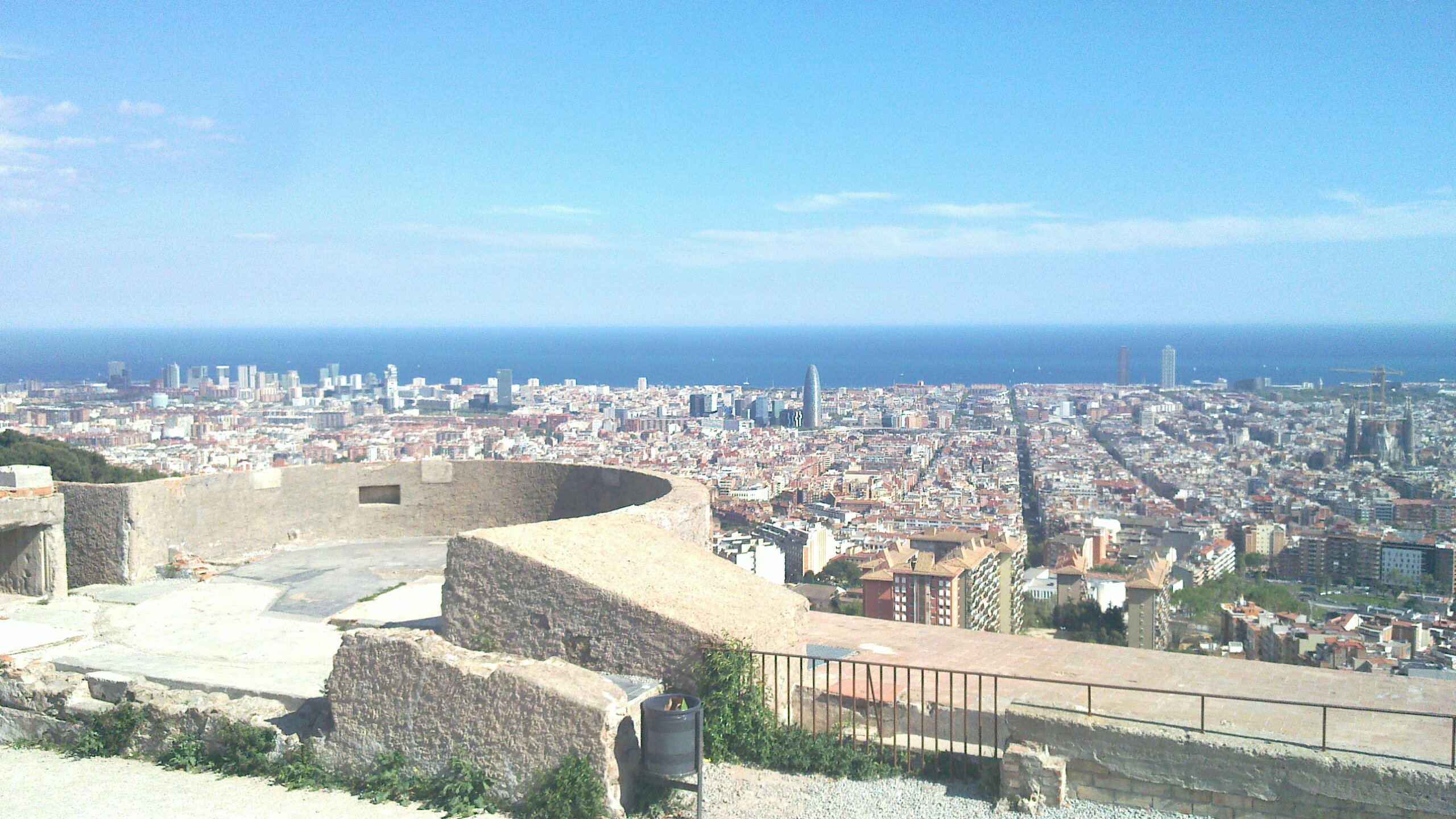
Bunkers of Turó de la Rovira, overlooking the city

Turó de la Rovira is a hill overlooking Barcelona with an altitude of 262m. It has been continually occupied, in one form or another, from the Iberian era (4th century B.C) to present. During the Spanish Civil War (1936–1939) the Republican anti-air defence authority (DECA) found that the hill was the most suitable place to build its anti-aircraft battery, which was instrumental in republican efforts to defend Barcelona. Post Spanish Civil-War the then abandoned military structures were used as shelters and the shanty town of Els Canons, which survived into the ‘90s, sprung up around them. Also during this time, water tanks and communication towers were installed, some of which can still be seen to this day.

== Iberian Settlement ==
In 1932, archaeologist Josep Colomines i Roca started excavations of an Iberian settlement at the summit of Turó de la Rovira. Here he uncovered part of a mural and some entrances, as well as an amount of other artefacts of significant interest.

== Civil War Anti-Air Defences ==
Aviation became the definitive weapon of post-WW1 conflict and significantly influenced the course of the Spanish Civil-War. Bombing was the perfect tool to disrupt the economy of war and the Bombing of Barcelona was the first large-scale and systematic aerial bombardment of any city. Seeing as Barcelona was easy to locate due to its characteristic seafront, authorities decided against continuing a passive defence of the sea and air, instead focussing on protecting their citizens through active defences, designed to neutralise enemy bombardments. For the locating of enemy planes, observation and listening centres were used. However, its lighting projectors, reflectors and acoustic locator apparatus (early form of radar) were not very precise. As for the neutralisation of enemy attacks, anti-aircraft guns and fighter planes were used.

The air defence of Barcelona consisted of surrounding the city with gun batteries giving a range of fire that could stop, or at least disrupt, the attacks carried out by German and Italian Air Forces who were allied to Franco. The batteries were situated in two zones: The waterfront where three to four batteries were split between Montjuïc and Poblenou, and Turó de la Rovira where another battery was set up. Batteries were also relocated from the fronts to the city to further bolster its protection when needed.

Each battery was complete with acoustic locators and various reflectors protected by anti-aircraft guns. These batteries became known as batteries of light and sound. The Turó de la Rovira battery consisted of four Vickers 105mm cannons and an ammunition depot protected by an anti-aircraft machine gun.

The artillery was disabled during a republican retreat between 25 and 26 January 1939, but the battle continued on the hilltop for some while longer.

== Els Canons Shantytown ==
Since the early twentieth century, Barcelona grew rapidly. The lack of housing was constant and this saw the uncontrolled growth of slums. Many slums that emerged in the first half of the century continued to grow up until the 1990s. By the end of the 1950s, shantytowns had reached their peak, with 20,000 huts housing some 100,000 people, about 6% of Barcelona’s population. This informal city stretched the length of the beach from Somorrostro to the old Chinatown (now the Vila Olímpica to Fòrum) as well as in the hills of Montjuïc and El Carmel, on the southern slopes of Turó de la Rovira.

At the summit of Turó de la Rovira the now disused gun battery was soon to be reused, and became a nucleus of new informal housing. The popular name Los Cañones came unequivocally from the military use of the site during the Civil War. The inhabitants arranged their huts in remarkable order in relation to the central axis of the battery, which they converted into their main street, and adapted to the complicated topography of the land. The general appearance of the shantytown corresponds with the architecture of Andalusia from where many of the inhabitants originated.

The district, characterised by strong organisational ties to the workers' unions, came to have around 110 huts and 600 residents. One of the main problems for inhabitants was water supply. It is no wonder then that, following the installation of a reservoir in 1963 by Barcelona’s water authority, someone managed to attach an improvised fountain, which can still be seen.

The shanty dwellers formed a representative group, the Carmel Residents Association (l’Associació de Veïns del Carmel) in 1972. In the mid-seventies, the association went to the city council looking for basic infrastructure; refuse bins, public toilets and running water.

It took up until the late ‘90s for the council to finally to commit to supplying the services. The neighbourhood association also pushed for the creation of a school for adults in the area.

== MUHBA Heritage Site ==
Its renovation in 2011 has transformed the Turó de la Rovira into a new space that combines its archaeological heritage with an outdoor museum and enclosed exhibit. With a unique perspective, it is part of the so-called balcony of Barcelona, which includes the Tres Turons (Three Hills), from Vallcarca bridge to Hill of the Rovira, it is strategic point from which to explain the urban development of the city.
