= Llucmajor station =

Metro station in Barcelona, Spain

Coordinates: 41°26′13.45″N 2°10′24.33″E

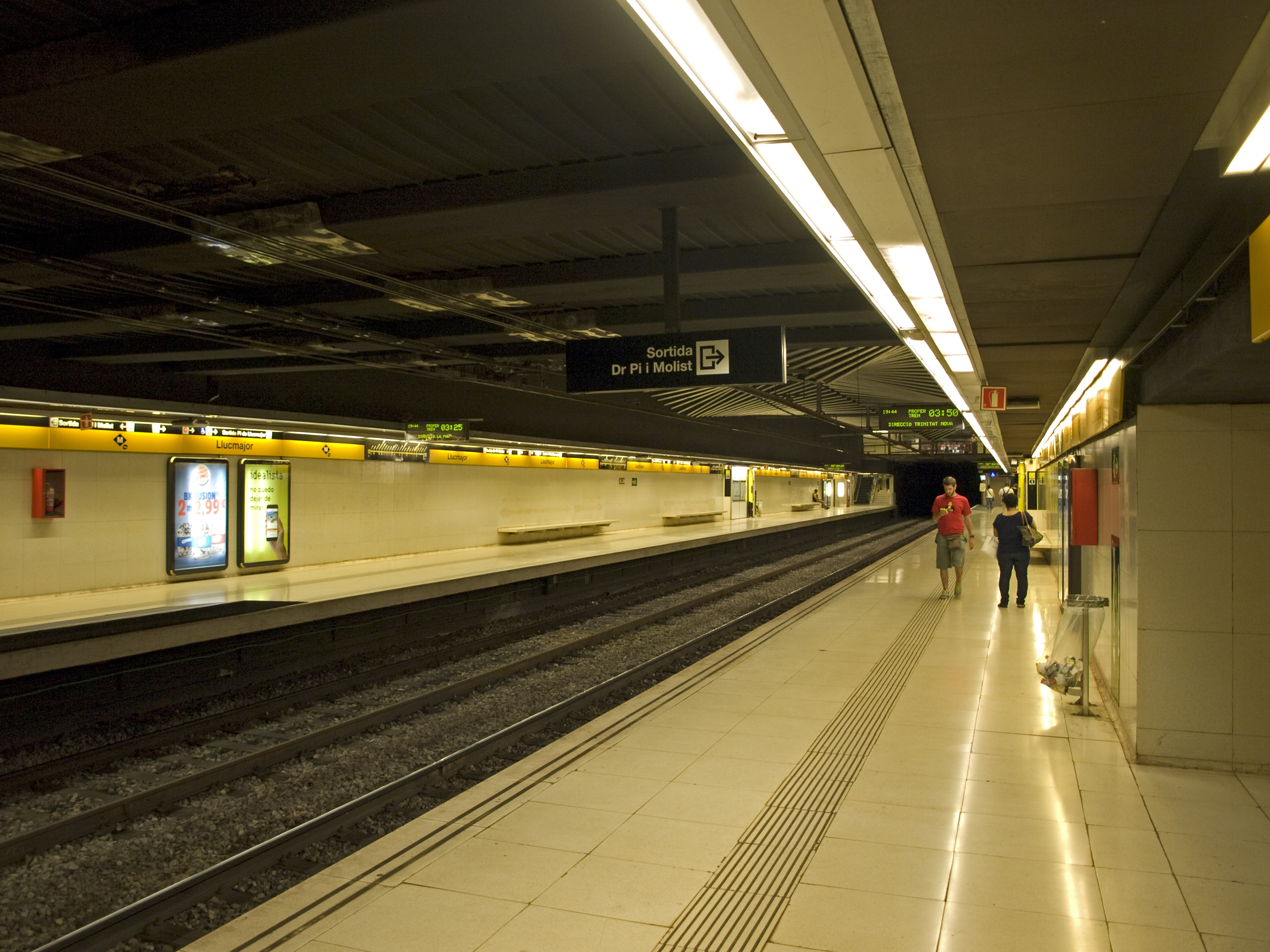
The platforms

Llucmajor (Catalan pronunciation: [ʎugməˈʒo]) is a Barcelona Metro station, on L4. Part of the extension of that line from Guinardó into Nou Barris opened in 1982 (44 years ago), it takes its name from Plaça de Llucmajor, the previous name of Plaça de la República, the central square of the district. The station is located under Passeig de Verdum, between carrer de Lorena and carrer de Formentor, and can be accessed from that intersection and from Jardins d'Alfàbia.

== Services ==
Preceding station	Metro	Following station
Via Júlia towards Trinitat Nova	L4	Maragall towards La Pau

== See also ==
- List of Barcelona Metro stations
