= Can Baró =

Neighborhood in Barcelona, Spain

Coordinates: 41°24′59″N 2°09′44″E

- Neighborhood of Barcelona
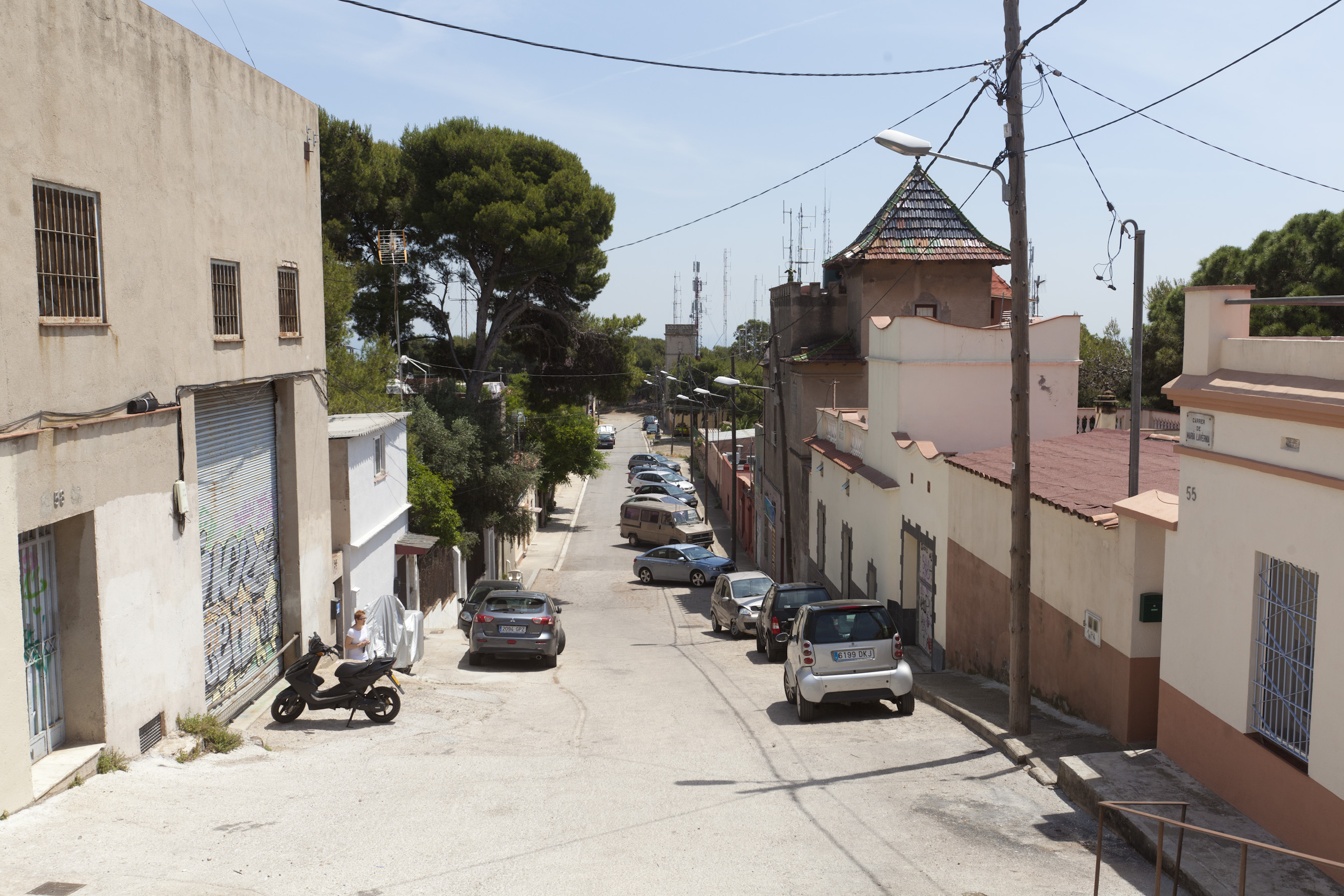
- Homes along the Turó de la Rovira
- Interactive map of Can Baró
- Country: Spain
- Autonomous community: Catalonia
- Province: Barcelona
- Comarca: Barcelonès
- Municipality: Barcelona
- District: Horta-Guinardó

Area
  - Total: 0.384 km^{2} (0.148 sq mi)

Population
  - Total: 8,969
  - Density: 23,400/km^{2} (60,500/sq mi)
- Demonym(s): baronenc, -a

Can Baró (Catalan pronunciation: [ˈkam bəˈɾo], Spanish pronunciation: [ˈkam baˈɾo]) is a neighborhood in the Horta-Guinardó district of Barcelona, Catalonia (Spain).

It is home to the Turó de la Rovira Museum of the History of Barcelona (MUHBA) heritage site, where anti-aircraft batteries were stationed during the Spanish Civil War. This heritage location also became a popular destination for crowds to gather at night-time, largely due to the peaceful location and panoramic view of the city.

On 2 May 2023, Barcelona City Council closed access to the Turó de la Rovira site between 19:30 and 09:00 in the summer, and 17:30 and 09:00 hours in the winter, due to concerns regarding noise pollution and antisocial behaviour.

== History ==
The area of Can Baro is named after a farmhouse of the same name which was built in 1674 by Josep Pascual de Pascali, the Baron of Sant Lluís. The farmhouse has lived many lives since then; in 1909 it served as a refuge for people fleeing the city of Barcelona during the Tragic Week. In addition, the Can Baro farmhouse served as a hospital during the Spanish Civil War.

== Turó de la Rovira ==
Can Baro is home to the 262m hill of Turó de la Rovira. The hill is famously older than the dinosaurs as it was formed over 250 million years ago, during the Palaeozoic era, before the appearance of the first dinosaurs.

The hill has played a critical role in the history of Barcelona. When the city was being expanded in the 20th Century, the limestone quarries on the hill were excavated extensively to aid with the construction of the Eixample neighbourhood.

== Mühlberg bridge ==
The excavation of limestone was so intense that a large hole developed in the hill and so a bridge was needed to enable the two sides to communicate. In 1991, Mühlberg bridge was built providing views over the city of Barcelona below.

== Can Baró Festival ==
Every year in June the festival of Can Baró takes place in the area. The primary goal is to bring the neighbourhood together around a host of activities, food tastings, Vermouth sampling and music and performances.
