= La Salut =

Coordinates: 41°24′45″N 2°09′17″E

- Neighborhood of Barcelona
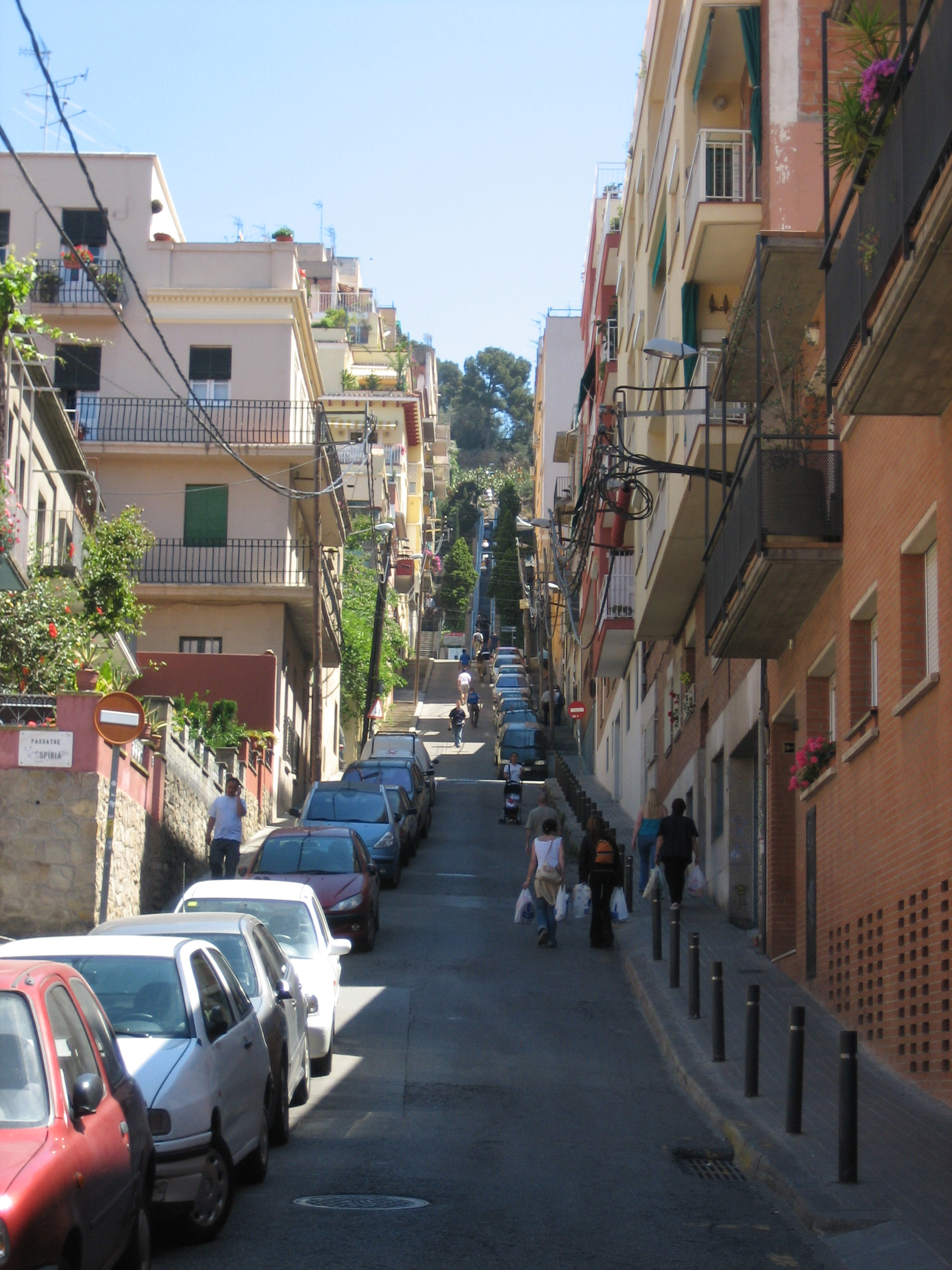
- Baixada de la Glòria
- Interactive map of La Salut
- Country: Spain
- Autonomous community: Catalonia
- Province: Barcelona
- Comarca: Barcelonès
- Municipality: Barcelona
- District: Gràcia

Area
  - Total: 0.643 km^{2} (0.248 sq mi)

Population
  - Total: 13,123
  - Density: 20,400/km^{2} (52,900/sq mi)

La Salut (Catalan pronunciation: [lə səˈlut]) is a neighborhood in the Gràcia district of Barcelona, Catalonia, Spain.
