= Guinardó/Hospital de Sant Pau station =

Metro station in Barcelona, Spain

Coordinates: 41°24′57.75″N 2°10′27.71″E

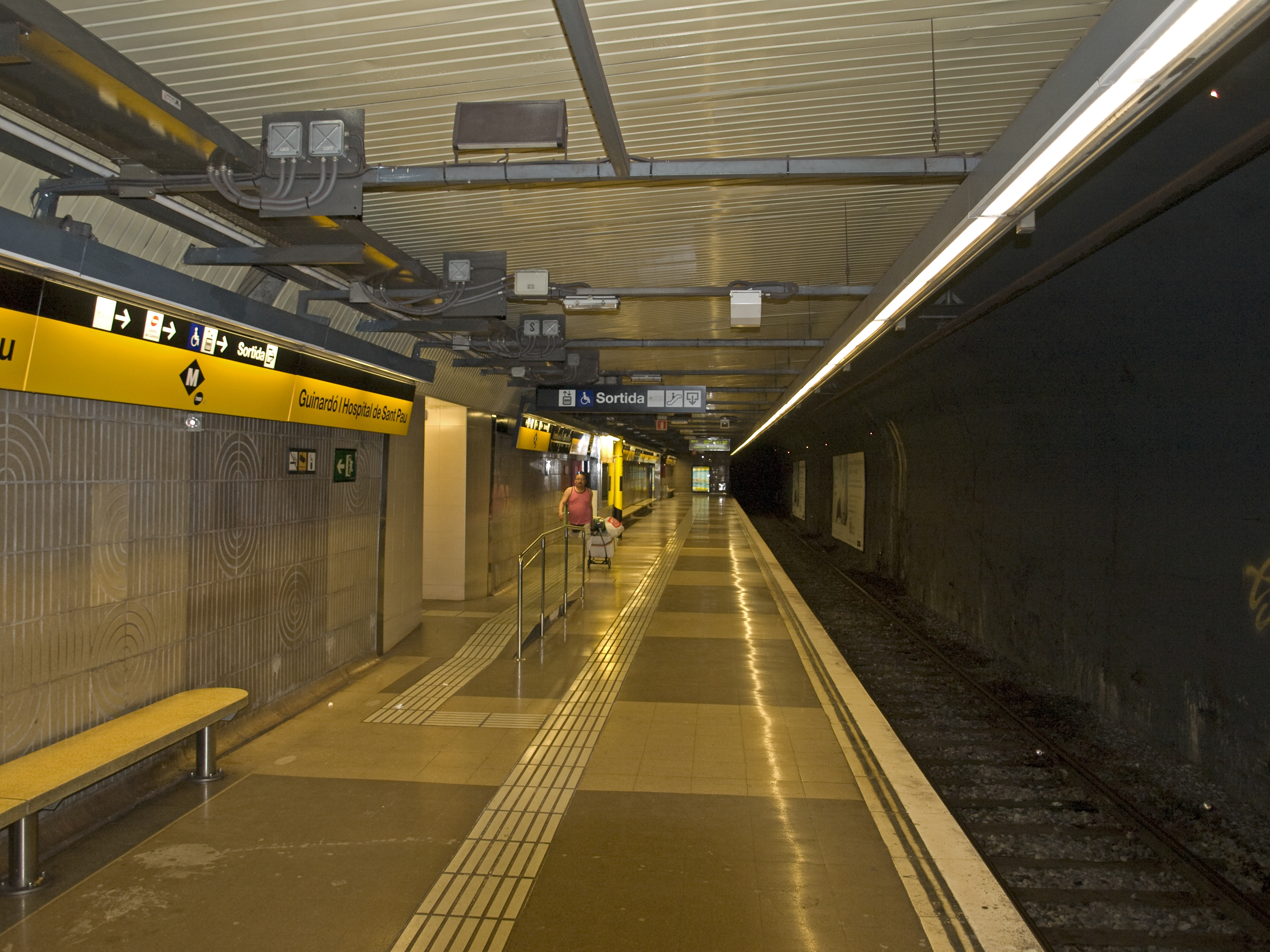
The northbound platform

Guinardó | Hospital de Sant Pau (Catalan pronunciation: [ɡinərˈdo uspiˈtal də ˌsam ˈpaw], until 2009 Guinardó) is a station of the Barcelona Metro, on L4, serving Ronda del Guinardó and Plaça del Guinardó. It opened in 1974 (52 years ago). The station is due to become part of double line L9-L10 in the near future.

== Services ==
Preceding station	Metro	Following station
Maragall towards Trinitat Nova	L4	Alfons X towards La Pau
Projected
Sanllehy towards Aeroport T1	L9	Plaça de Maragall towards Can Zam
Sanllehy towards Polígon Pratenc	L10	Plaça de Maragall towards Gorg

== See also ==
- List of Barcelona Metro stations
