= Horta station (Barcelona) =

Metro station in Barcelona, Spain

Coordinates: 41°25′46″N 2°9′43″E

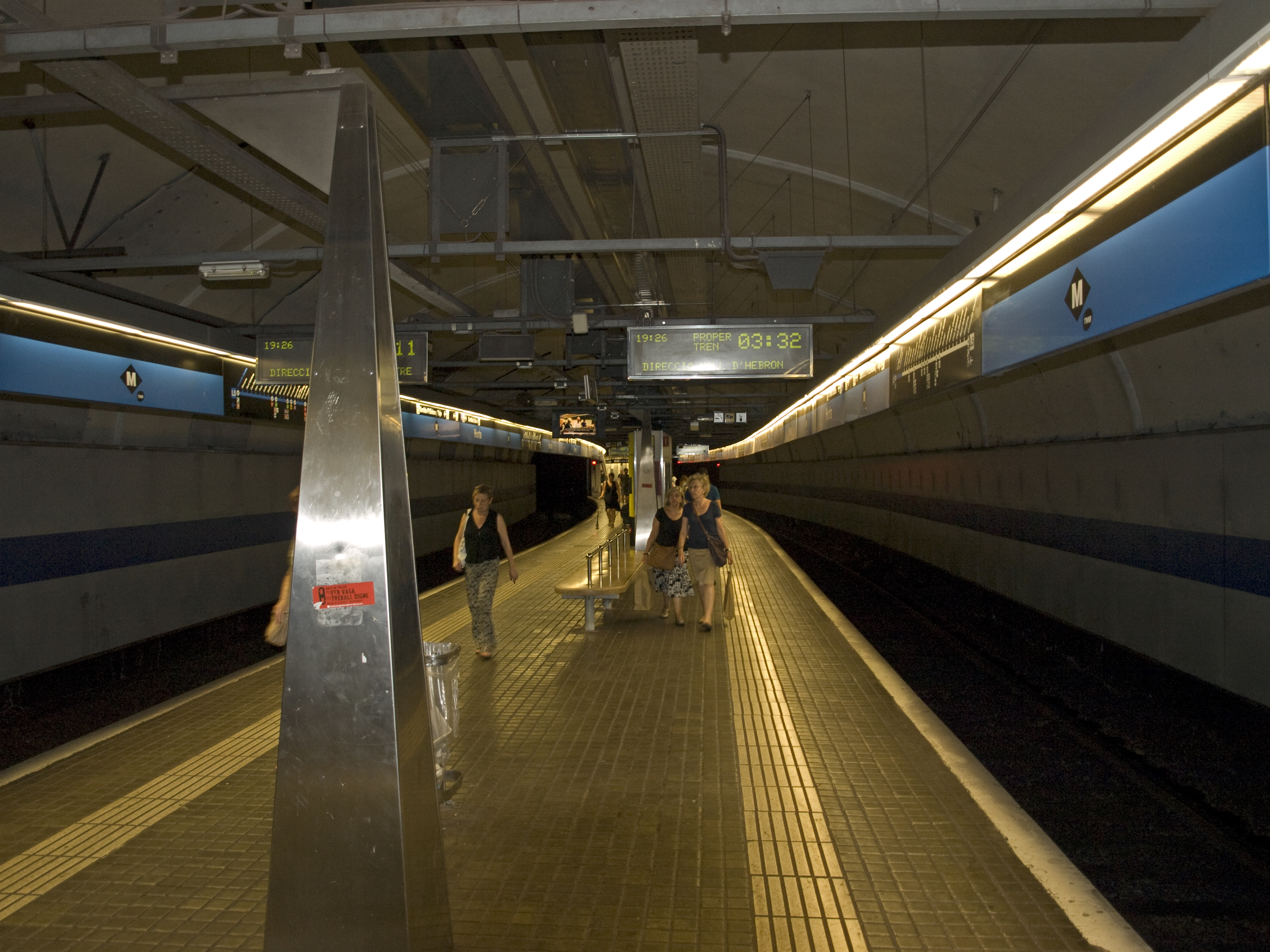
The platform

Horta (Catalan pronunciation: [ˈɔɾtə]) is a station in the Barcelona metro network, served by L5, located under carrer de Lisboa, in the Horta-Guinardó district of Barcelona. It was opened in 1967, when an extension of the line into the neighbourhood of the same name from Vilapicina was opened.

The partially curved island-platform station has a ticket hall at either end, one with two accesses, the other with one.

Horta was the terminus before the line was extended in July 2010 towards Vall d'Hebron, meeting L3.

== Services ==
Preceding station	Metro	Following station
Vilapicina towards Cornellà Centre	L5	El Carmel towards Vall d'Hebron

== See also ==
- List of Barcelona Metro stations
