= Vilapicina station =

Metro station in Barcelona, Spain

Coordinates: 41°25′50″N 2°10′05″E

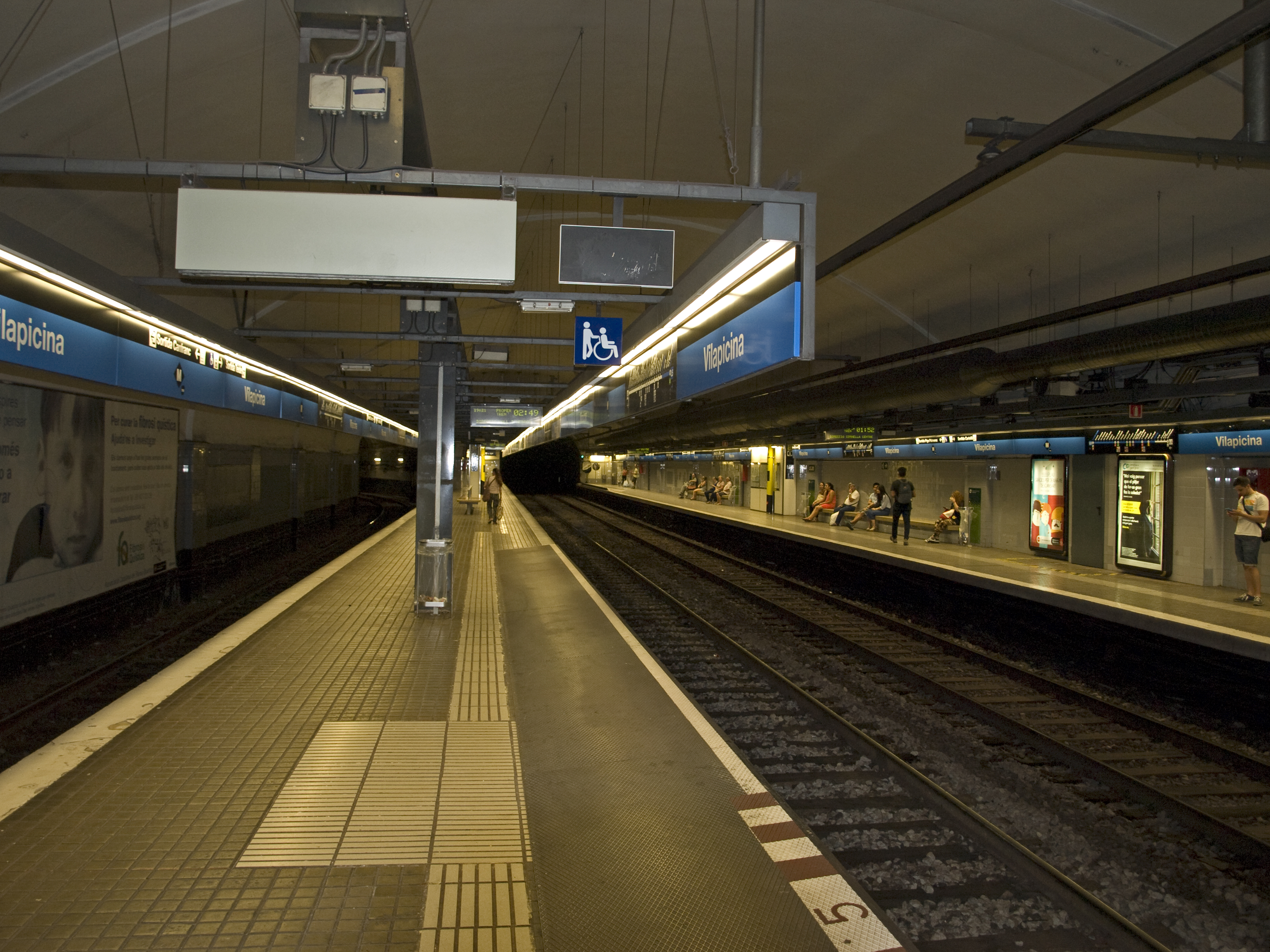
The platform

Vilapicina (Catalan pronunciation: [ˌbiləpiˈsinə]) is a station on line 5 of the Barcelona Metro.

The station is located underneath Passeig Fabra i Puig, between Carrer Teide and Carrer Petrarca. It was opened in 1959, and served as a terminus until the opening of Horta in 1967.

The station has a ticket hall on either end, one with two accesses, the other with one. The station has two platforms and three tracks, the outermost one leading to the nearby train depot.

== Services ==
Preceding station	Metro	Following station
Virrei Amat towards Cornellà Centre	L5	Horta towards Vall d'Hebron
