= Via Júlia station =

Metro station in Barcelona, Spain

Coordinates: 41°26′37.98″N 2°10′43.23″E

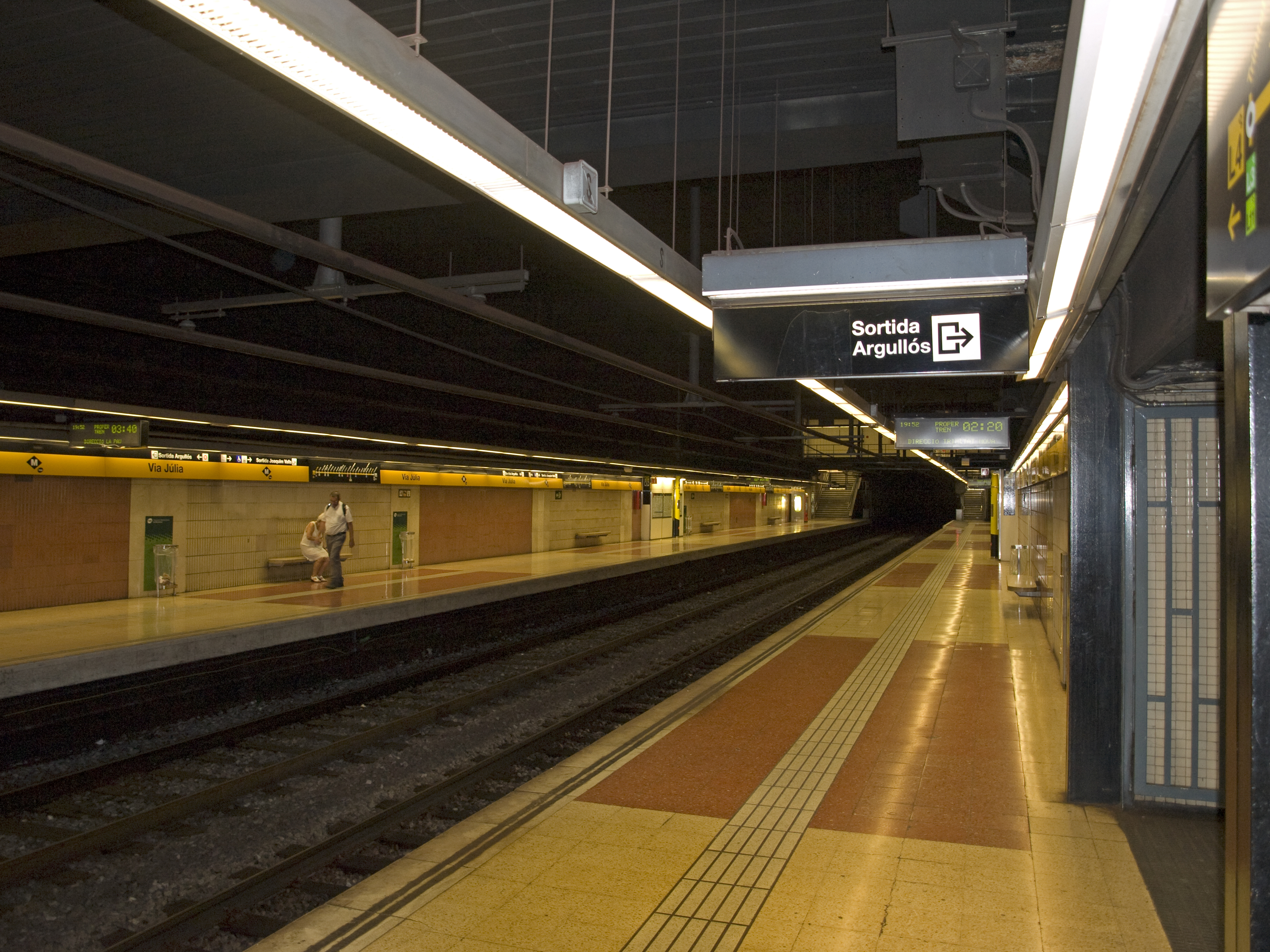
The platforms

Via Júlia (Catalan pronunciation: [ˈbi.ə ˈʒuli.ə]) is a Barcelona Metro station, on L4. It opened in 1982 (44 years ago) but did not take its current name until 1999; before then it was known as Roquetes (name recently retaken by another station). It's located in the Roquetes area of the Nou Barris district, underneath Via Júlia, an important road in the area, between two streets: Carrer de Joaquim Valls and Carrer d'Argullós and can be accessed from both sides of the road.

== Services ==
Preceding station	Metro	Following station
Trinitat Nova Terminus	L4	Llucmajor towards La Pau

== See also ==
- List of Barcelona Metro stations
