= Alfons X station =

Metro station in Barcelona, Spain

Coordinates: 41°24′44″N 2°9′55″E

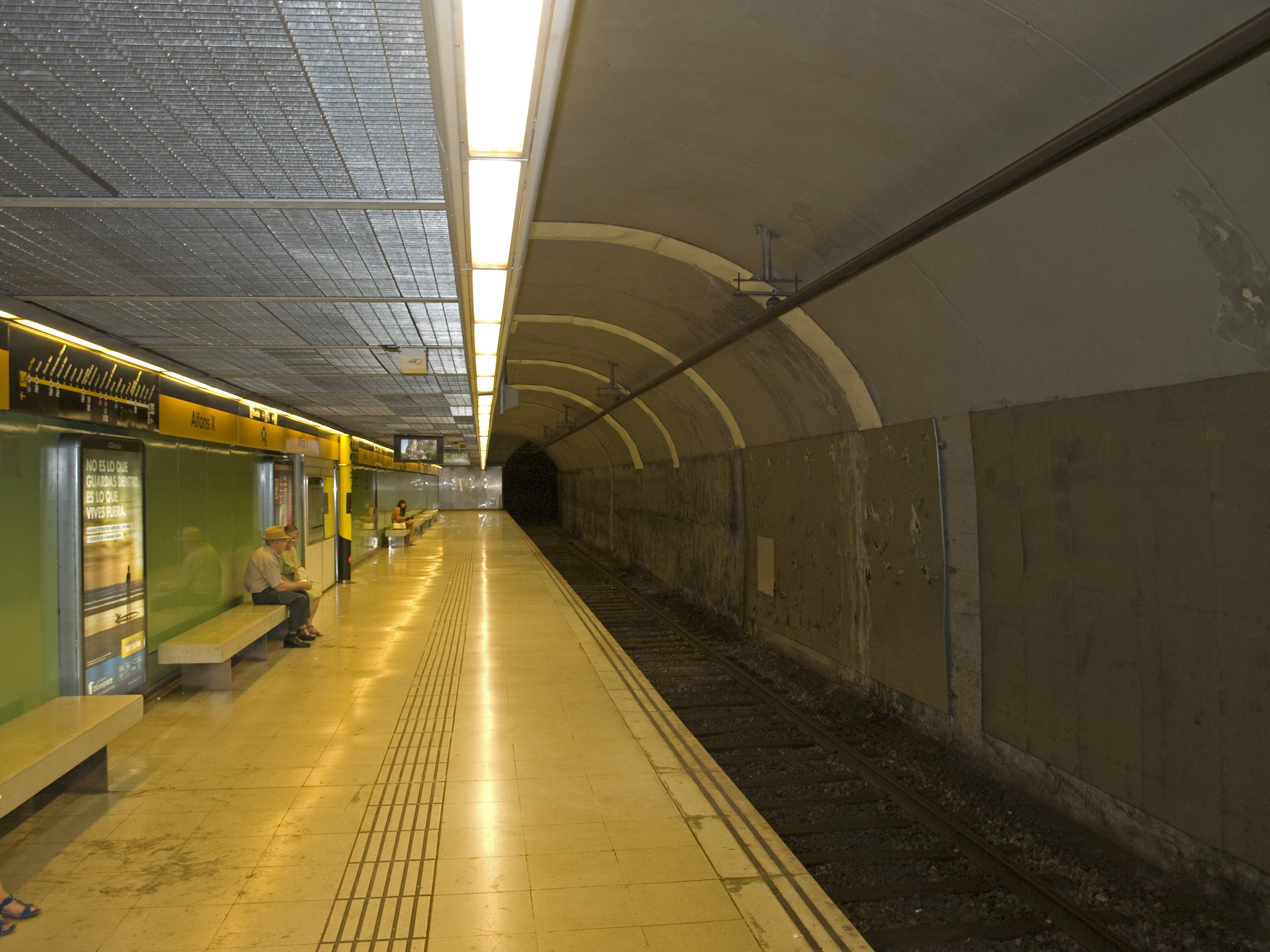
The southbound platform

Alfons X (Catalan pronunciation: [əlˈfonz dəˈzɛ], previously [əlˈfonz ˈðɛw]) is a Barcelona metro station, located under Ronda Guinardó and Plaça d'Alfons el Savi, named after Alfonso X of Castile, in the Horta-Guinardó district of Barcelona.

Opened in 1974 (52 years ago), the station is currently served by L4. It has three entrances, one on the square itself, a second one next to Parc de les Aigües and another one on Carrer Lepant. As of 2007 it is the only metro service in the surrounding area (Can Baró), and will be until Sanllehy metro station on L9 and L10 is complete.

== Services ==
Preceding station	Metro	Following station
Guinardó | Hospital de Sant Pau towards Trinitat Nova	L4	Joanic towards La Pau
