= El Carmel =

Coordinates: 41°25′6.01″N 2°9′15.97″E

- Neighborhood of Barcelona
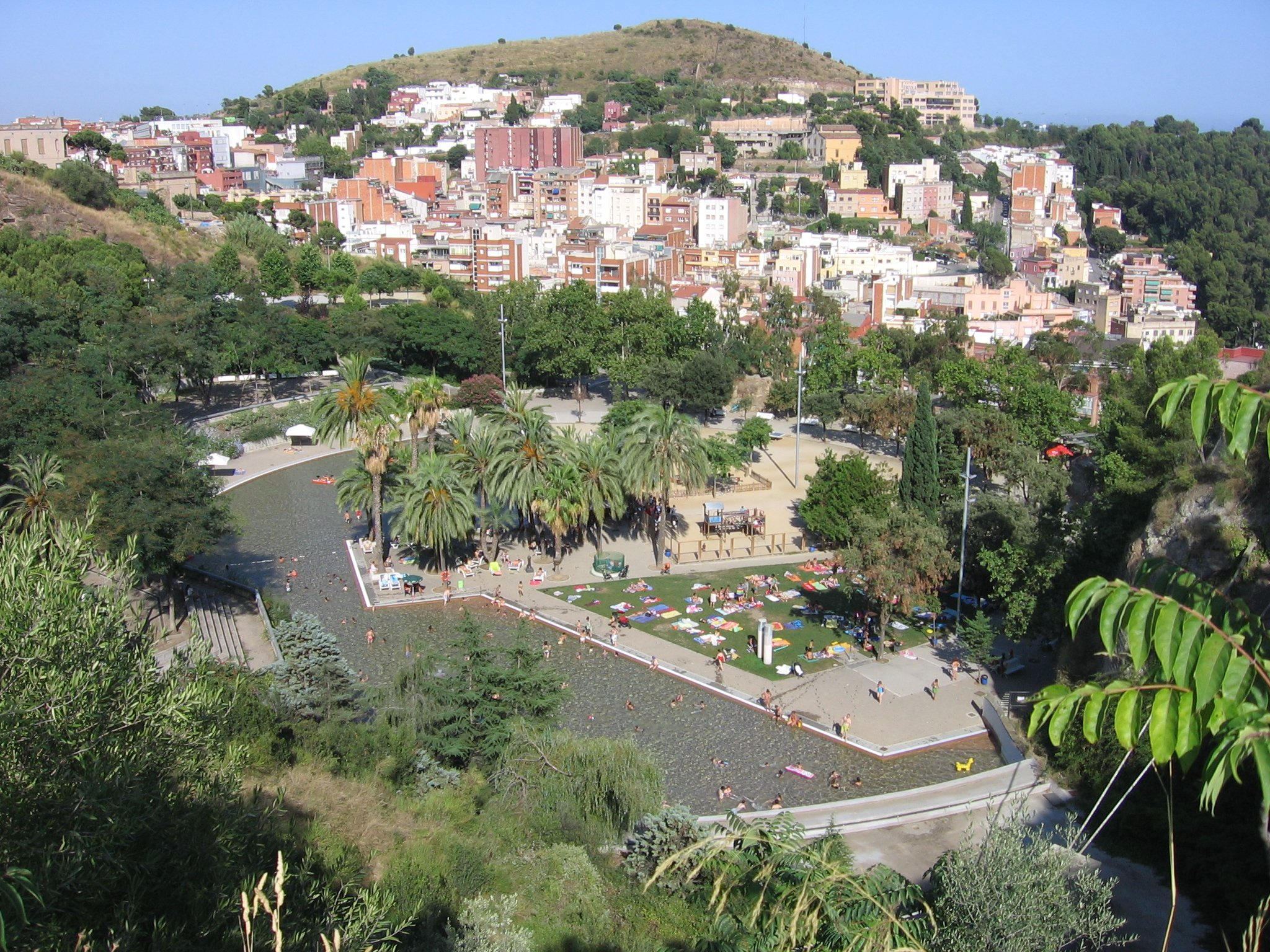
- Interactive map of El Carmel
- Country: Spain
- Autonomous community: Catalonia
- Province: Barcelona
- Comarca: Barcelonès
- Municipality: Barcelona
- District: Horta-Guinardó
- Named for: Our Lady of Mount Carmel

Area
  - Total: 0.942 km^{2} (0.364 sq mi)

Population
  - Total: 31,377
  - Density: 33,300/km^{2} (86,300/sq mi)

El Carmel (Catalan pronunciation: [əl kəɾˈmɛl], in Spanish: El Carmelo Spanish pronunciation: [el kaɾˈmelo]), is a neighbourhood in the district of Horta-Guinardó, in Barcelona, Catalonia, Spain.

Carmel is in the municipal district of Horta-Guinardó. The area was developed mainly in the 1960s and 1970s when immigrant workers, encouraged to move to Barcelona by the government of Francoist Spain, built housing for themselves. Initially isolated on the rural hillside of what is now Parc dels Tres Turons ("Three Hills Park"), the combination of structures put up without building permits alongside more planned urban development has given the area its modern appearance of buildings piled higgledy-piggledy on the hillside.

It extends across the hill of the same name, part of the foothills of the Collserola mountain range, with rugged terrain and numerous slopes, resulting in steep inclines on many of the neighborhood's streets.

Carmel became infamous in 2005 for a major accident during the construction of a tunnel. It brought to a halt the expansion works on line 5 of the Barcelona Metro and led to the evacuation of dozens of buildings in the area. Local residents protested and most of those evacuated to other areas were eventually rehoused and a new school opened. Barcelona City Council has pledged more investment in the area to improve transport, accessibility and services.

== See also ==
- Urban planning of Barcelona
