= El Guinardó =

Coordinates: 41°25′09″N 2°10′26″E

- Neighborhood of Barcelona
- Interactive map of El Guinardó
- Country: Spain
- Autonomous community: Catalonia
- Province: Barcelona
- Comarca: Barcelonès
- Municipality: Barcelona
- District: Horta-Guinardó

Area
  - Total: 1.308 km^{2} (0.505 sq mi)

Population
  - Total: 36,176
  - Density: 27,660/km^{2} (71,630/sq mi)
- Demonym(s): guinardorenc, -a

El Guinardó (Catalan pronunciation: [əl ɣinərˈdo], Spanish: [el ɣinaɾˈðo]) is a neighborhood in the Horta-Guinardó district of Barcelona (Spain).

El Guinardó is a neighborhood nestled within the old municipality of Sant Martí de Provençals, straddling the border between Horta — with which it once shared some land — and Gràcia. It sprawls across the eastern slopes of Cerro del Carmelo (Mount Carmel). Up until the late 19th century, the area was mostly rural: farmland, quarries (like the one now in Can Baró), pastures, and farmhouses, including Mas Guinardó (which lent its name to the neighborhood), Mas Viladomat, els Mas Casanovas, Mas Vintró, and the Torre dels Pardals.
