= Gràcia =

District of Barcelona, Catalonia

Coordinates: 41°24′24″N 2°09′29″E

- District of Barcelona

- Districts of Barcelona, Gràcia coloured red
- Interactive map of Gràcia
- Country: Spain
- Autonomous Community: Catalonia
- Province: Barcelona
- Comarca: Barcelonès
- Municipality: Barcelona

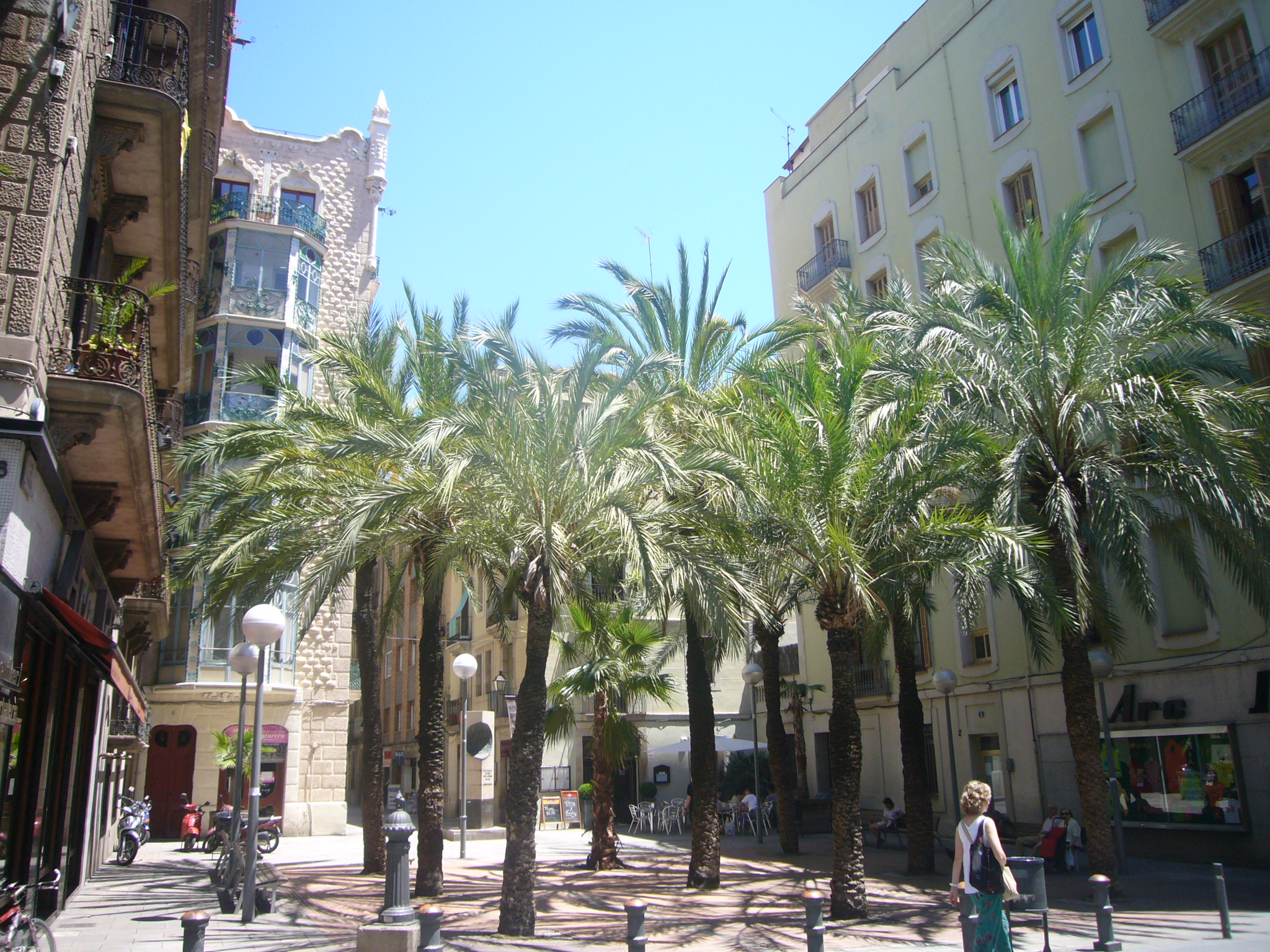
Plaça de Trilla (Trilla Square), Gràcia, Barcelona.

Gràcia (Catalan pronunciation: [ˈɡɾasi.ə], lit. 'Grace', Spanish: [ˈɡɾaθja]), is a district of the Mediterranean city of Barcelona, in the northeastern autonomous community of Catalonia, Spain. It comprises the barris (neighborhoods) of Vila de Gràcia, Vallcarca i els Penitents, El Coll, La Salut and Camp d'en Grassot i Gràcia Nova. Gràcia is bordered by the districts of Eixample to the south, Sarrià-Sant Gervasi to the west, and Horta-Guinardó to the east. A vibrant and diverse enclave of Catalan life, Gràcia was an independent municipality for centuries before being formally annexed by Barcelona in 1897, as a part of the city's expansions.

== Neighbourhoods ==
The district of Gràcia comprises five neighbourhoods:

Code	Neighborhood	Population (2009)	Area (ha)	Density (inhabitants/ha)
28	Vallcarca i els Penitents	15 687	120.9	129.8
29	El Coll	7 299	35.8	203.9
30	La Salut	13 332	64.4	207.2
31	Vila de Gràcia	52 801	132.6	398.2
32	Camp d'en Grassot i Gràcia Nova	34 838	65.0	536.4
	Gràcia	123 957	418.6	296.2

== History ==
Gràcia, located at the foot of the Serra de Collserola (to the north-northwest, from Central Barcelona), was established in 1626 by a Novitiate of Carmelites, whom established a convent called Nostra Senyora de Gràcia (Our Lady of Grace). Following the War of the Spanish Succession, Gràcia remained an independent municipality. Historically, many of the well-known streets and lanes of today's Gràcia were mere country roads linking the region to larger urban areas through the plain of Barcelona; Passeig de Gràcia, one such historic route, is now home to many international fashion stores, as well as restaurants, specialty shops and hotels, and has been described as "Barcelona's version" of the Parisian Champs-Élysées. [citation needed]

During the mid-1800s, along with much of the settled world, Barcelona rapidly industrialised, significantly expanding its city limits beyond the Roman walls and old city. The phenomenon of the 19th-century Industrial Revolution drew large numbers of Catalans from the surrounding countryside; this growing workforce spurred a shift from previously agrarian, agriculture-based economies to more urban, factory-centered industries, with focus on manufacturing, textiles and trade.

Between 1801 and 1850, the population of Barcelona increased over 50%, growing from nearly 115,000 to roughly 187,000 citizens; however, this rapid growth and rise in industrialisation created a number of unforeseen problems, including overcrowded living quarters, densely-crowded streets and poor public infrastructure. These issues all contributed to squalid conditions and general poverty, which created the breeding grounds for rampant disease, something which particularly affected the city's lower and working classes. Life expectancy plummeted to just 23 years for the poorest inhabitants, and 36 years for those from slightly wealthier backgrounds. The city's sewage system, already inadequately designed to handle such a rapid increase in population, was overwhelmed by the masses of people congregating on the tight streets, and the tightly constructed buildings offered little in terms of fresh air or ventilation. The Junta de Derribo, published in the 1840s provides an account of this period.

In 1854, the government of Barcelona recognised the need for an answer to these population issues, and began planning the construction of what would become the Eixample district. Situated between the old city of neighbourhoods such as El Raval, Barri Gòtic, and El Born, and the outlying municipalities of Gràcia, Sant Martí, Sants, and Montjuïc, the Eixample (alternatively known as L’Eixample in Catalan). These plans underwent a number of iterations. In 1855, the Ministry of Development, under the authority of the federal government in Spain at the time, commissioned Ildefons Cerdà, a Catalan urban planner, to design the new district. However, the local government, rejected Cerdà's plan in a politically motivated decision.

A subsequent project competition was held, but Cerdà's entry lost to one supported by the local city council, that of Antoni Rovira i Trias, another Catalan urban planner. Rovira i Trias played a central role in demolition of the 18th-century military installation, Ciutadella, which helped open Barcelona to the developments of the new century. Despite losing the contest, Cerdà's plan (which was heavily criticised at the time by his contemporaries as being overtly socialist) weathered the controversy and became the basis of the Eixample district, as it retained the support of the central Spanish government.

Over the next forty years, as the plan took hold and the city began to sprawl, the Eixample rapidly pushed Barcelona's borders closer and closer to the long-independent municipality of Gràcia. In 1897, Barcelona formally annexed the town of Gràcia, and it has existed since as a neighborhood of the Catalan capital. Although no longer independent, Gràcia has long maintained a distinct identity as a unique district of the diverse, larger metropolis to which it belongs.

== Life in Gràcia ==
Today, Gràcia is home to over 120,000 people, according to the Instituto Nacional de Estadística, Gràcia is both the smallest district by area, at 4.2 km2, and the second most densely populated neighbourhood in Barcelona. One of the hippest, most cosmopolitan areas in the city, Gràcia's intimate, close-packed streets and predominantly low-rise, Mediterranean architecture give it a distinct feel. Its old, one-way streets are organized around a series of plazas, including Plaça de Vila de Gràcia, Plaça del Sol and Plaça de la Virreina. "Old-world charm" abounds.

The Gràcia population is a mix of young professionals and artists and a growing elderly population, with a significant portion of older Catalans who came of age as Franco came to power. Catalan flags adorn many a Gràcia window or terrace, symbols of the neighbourhood's fiercely pro-independence politics.

Compared to other Barcelonian neighbourhoods, Ciutat Vella and the rest of the old city, Gràcia is devoid of major tourist attractions. In this bohemian enclave of Catalan urban life there aren't many international brands or fast-food chains. Instead, small gourmet street food outposts are common; there are an array of ethnic cuisines, from Japanese to Greek. as well are small cafes which serve Spanish tapas and Catalan specialties. Shopping abounds in shops selling trinkets and vintage clothing. Artisans and artists can be found in the squares and in small ground-floor shops.

Travellers account for Gracia's good shopping opportunities (e.g. on Carrer de Verdi) and its authentic atmosphere, based on its quiet placas and Catalan cuisine. Nightlife in Gràcia is dominated by Spanish café culture, with an abundance of small bars and restaurants that host late-night revelry and long conversations. At the weekends, one might hear any number of local live music acts, from a single guitarist to a four-piece band.

For transportation, Gràcia is served by the L3 (Green) and L4 (Yellow) lines of the Barcelona metro, with stops at Penitents, Vallcarca, Lesseps, and Fontana on the L3, and Joanic and Verdaguer on the L4. The Ferrocarrils de la Generalitat de Catalunya (FGC) also operates the Gràcia station of the Barcelona – Metro de Vallès line. Additionally, numerous bus and night bus lines in the TMB Barcelona system cover Gràcia. As with the rest of the city, bikes are very common.

== Artistic influences ==
The neighbourhood of Gràcia is both culturally and artistically distinct from the rest of the city of Barcelona. The neighbourhood was considered a separate municipality until its annexation in 1897, and its unique culture has persisted, rendering it a completely self-sufficient area of Barcelona. Although its eclectic charm attracts travellers from all over, unlike much of Barcelona, the majority of Gràcia's inhabitants are locals. During the day, the "hipster" barri is full of life, projecting a hip and edgy vibe. At night, however, the environment transforms, and although the narrow streets are quiet and peaceful, bars often host talented jazz singers, and groups of teenagers gather in the squares.

Several historic sites in Gràcia enhance its eclectic charm. For instance, Casa Vicens, designed by Antoni Gaudí, the famous Catalan modernist architect, is one of the neighborhood's main attractions. In 1883 construction was put into effect with a blueprint consisting of ground-floor buildings and a garden. Later, Gaudí approved an extension consisting of stairs and a patio, and Casa Vicens has been restored on multiple occasions to preserve Gaudí's vision.

Central to Gaudí's design philosophy was his belief that every aspect of his designs are equal in importance. The smoking room door displays this attention to detail, with many intricate coloured glass pieces that illuminate at night. Gaudí also took into account minor details such as the stairs leading to areas of the roof rarely inhabited. That the design aspects often seem unrelated makes for an aesthetically interesting work of art.

Eusebi Güell, a close friend of Gaudí, commissioned him to bring into fruition the Park Güell. Güell selected an area of Muntanya Pelada, where he envisioned a park modeled after the residential parks of England, with views of the sea on display for its residents. Already blooming were carob and olive trees, and based on the weather conditions, Guadí's design included Mediterranean plants that would not require considerable water to thrive. He also devised a fully functional irrigation system to provide the community with water resources. Not only did Güell occupy an old mansion on the estate, but Gaudí himself resided in a home there with several family members.

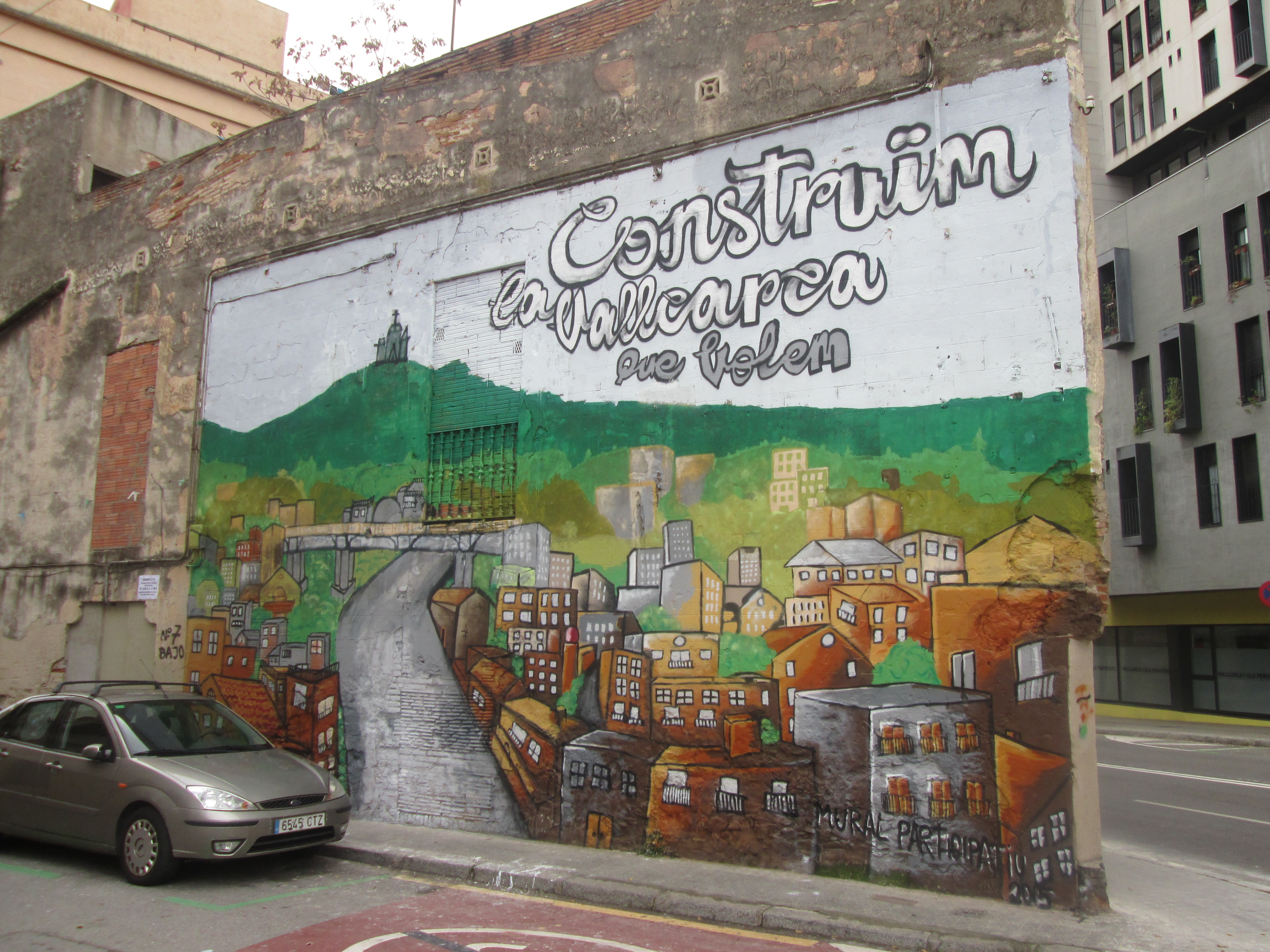
Graffiti near Lesseps Metro in Gràcia

By 1914 only these two houses had been built, forcing Gaudí to abandon his plans for some sixty houses. Nevertheless, the estate was converted into a private garden, and in 1963, Gaudi's house was made accessible to the public with its grand opening as the "Gaudí House Museum." In 1984, Park Güell was declared a "Patrimonio de la Humanidad", or World Heritage Site, by UNESCO.

Graffiti tours have become a main tourist attraction in Barcelona, and Gràcia is home to many pieces adorning its otherwise serene streets with vibrant colours. The works of artist Ozzy appears in many parts of Barcelona and is known for bright poster designs, while the artist known as C215 produces detailed stenciled works.

== Tradition ==
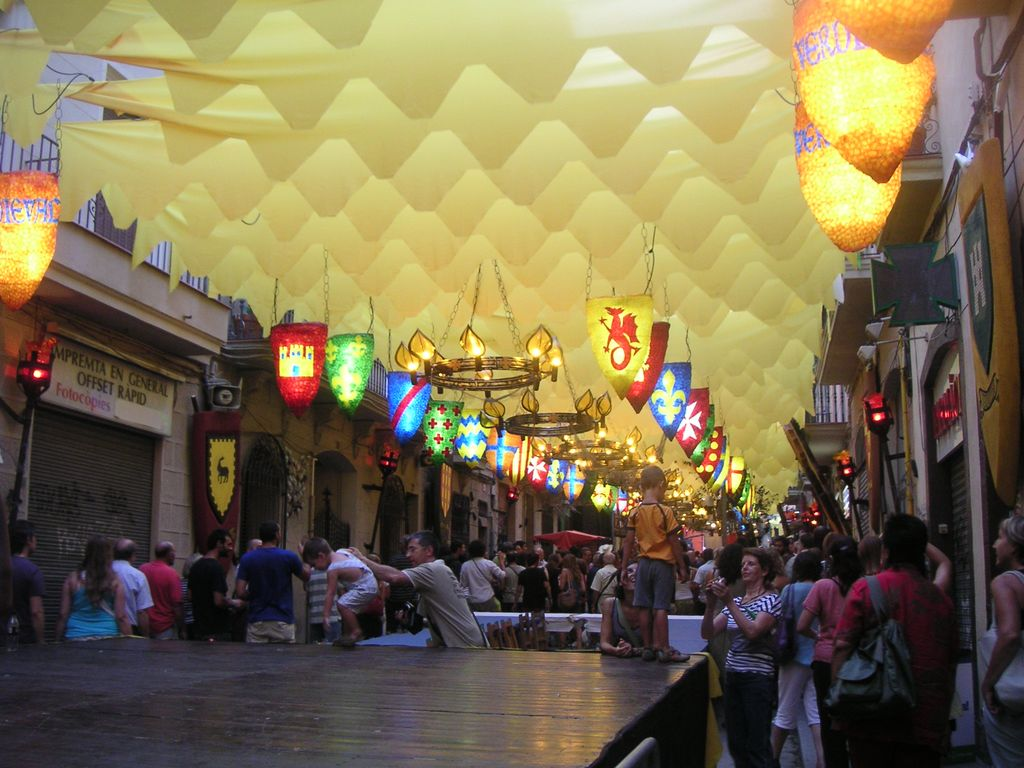
A typical street display during the Festa Major in Gràcia

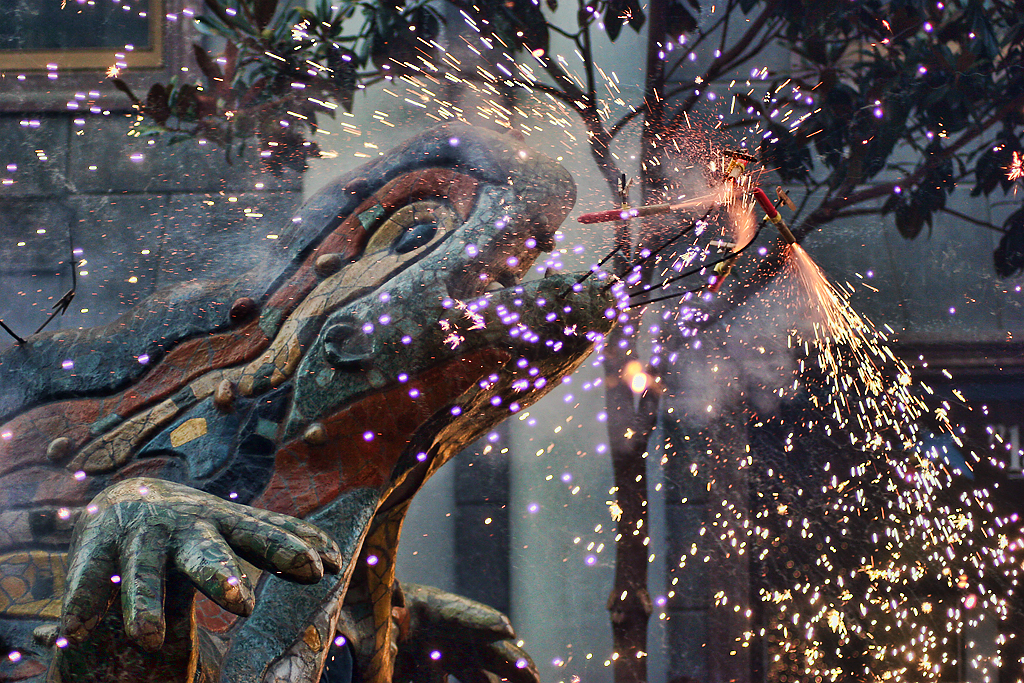
An ornate creature at the Festes de Gràcia

The most notable event in Gràcia is the Festes de Gràcia, which goes on for eight days every August. The largest neighbourhood festival in Barcelona, the Festa Major de Gràcia began in 1817 as a celebration of the neighbourhood itself (at the time still an independent town). Gràcia's residents compete for the crown of best street or square, selecting distinct themes and extensively decorating in Spanish carnival style, and organised by a number of local associations. The selected themes range from scenes of nature to wild animals and creatures, to characters from popular culture.

The Catalan practice of castellers, dating back to the 18th century, is also enacted. The inhabitants of Valls, a tiny town located on the outskirts of Barcelona, initiated this tradition of human towers, which became a competitive sport. The original structure was accompanied by a traditional folklore dance, and although the flute still accompanies the performance to this day, the dance became a separate spectacle by the 19th century.

The modern Catalan castell is similar to its original design: the pinya is a large ring at the bottom of the structure that supports the human weight, and each level consists of a specific number of people. The tronc, meaning "trunk" in Catalan, is composed of several levels, and only children are permitted to make up the top level due to their lighter weight. The "anxeta", the smallest child who holds the position at the top of the tower, is the last to climb the structure, and only remains there for several seconds, saluting the crowd below. Most often, around nine people form a single castell made up of up to seven or eight rows, and each structure has its own name.

At night booths sell alcoholic beverages and an abundance of live musical acts of many genres are present. 1.5 million people are rumored to attend each August over the week, although this figure is not verified.

== Landmarks ==
To the northern (mountain) end of Gràcia on El Carmel mountain (and technically outside its borders depending on who is asked) lies Park Güell, arguably the most famous work of Catalonia's most famous architect, Antoni Gaudí.

On "Carrer de les Carolines", between Plaça Lesseps and Fontana, lies Casa Vicens, Gaudí's first major work of architecture and a staple in his canon of modernist design. An occupied house for decades, Casa Vicens only recently became a tourist attraction on 15 November 2017. The building was declared a UNESCO World Heritage Site in 2005.

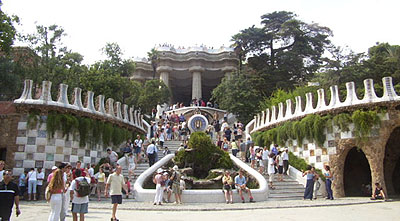
Parc Güell

Casa Fuster, a fabled, grand modernist-style hotel that lies at the edge of Gràcia's southern (water) end on the Plaça de Nicolás Salmerón. Designed by Catalan master architect Lluís Domènech i Montaner between 1908 and 1910, the ornate house was converted to a hotel in 2004.

In the Plaça de la Vila de Gràcia, the bell tower marks the old administrative centre of the former independent municipality. The tower, a 33-meter-high octagonal figure, was built by Rovira i Trias between 1862 and 1864. A legend describes the "Campana de Gràcia" and its role in local conflicts from 1870.

Gràcia was the original home to the Teatre Lliure, one of Spain's most prestigious theatres (the theatre has since relocated to Montjuïc). Additionally, the Cinema Verdi shows both local and foreign (Western) films in their original languages.

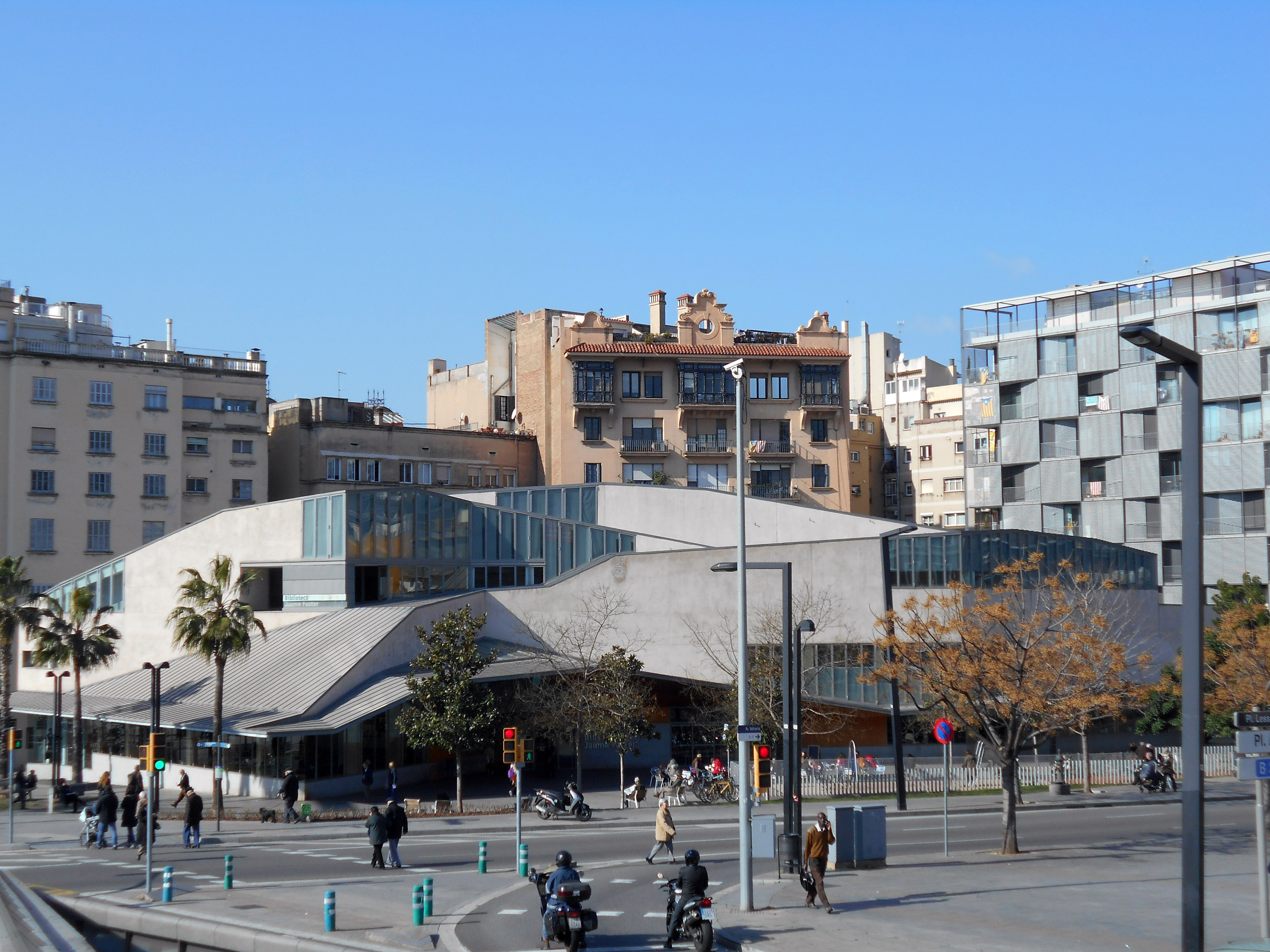
Biblioteca Jaume Fuster

In Plaça Lesseps, named after French diplomat and entrepreneur Ferdinand de Lesseps who developed the Suez Canal, the Biblioteca Jaume Fuster is an attractive, modern addition to the neighbourhood. "Designed by architect Josep Llinàs i Carmona, it is one of the largest and most modern" libraries in Barcelona. It opened in 2005.

== Gràcia in fiction ==
Mercè Rodoreda's most important novel, The Time of the Doves (La plaça del diamant), is set mainly in Gràcia at the time of the Second Spanish Republic and the Spanish Civil War.

The eponymous protagonist of the short story "María dos Prazeres" by Gabriel García Márquez lives in an apartment in the neighbourhood of Gràcia in the years of Francoist Spain.

== See also ==
- List of streets and squares in Gràcia
- Districts of Barcelona
- Street names in Barcelona
- Urban planning of Barcelona
