= Transport in Castelldefels =

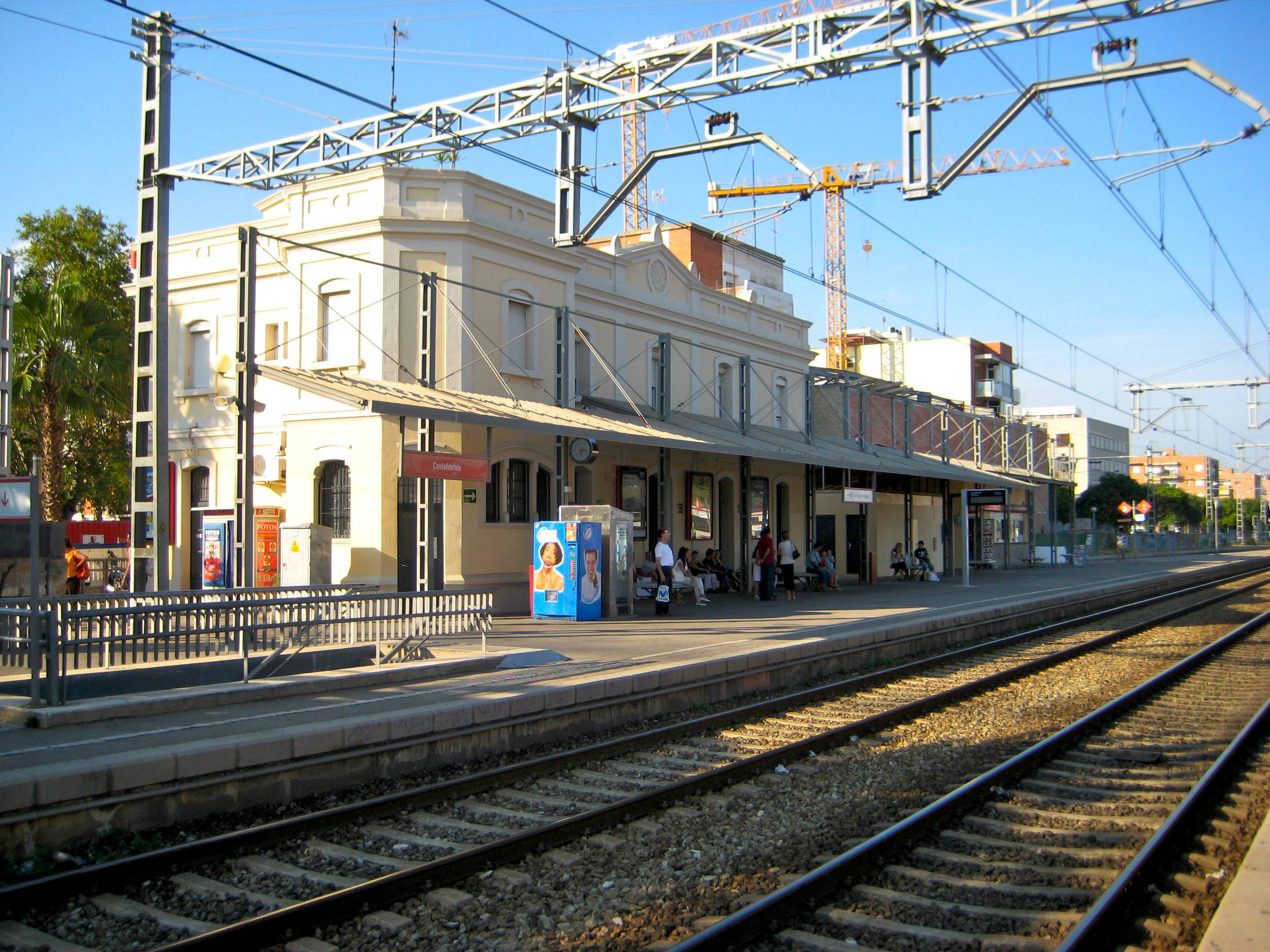
Castelldefels railway station.

Public transport in Castelldefels (Catalonia, Spain) belongs to the broader Metropolitan Area of Barcelona transportation network, organised around the entity Autoritat del Transport Metropolità (ATM). Castelldefels is both a dormitory town, with many commuters driving everyday into Barcelona, and an important locality in itself.

== Railway transport ==
Trains first arrived in 1881 in Castelldefels with the introduction of the Vilanova line.

=== Railway stations ===
Both part of the Rodalies Barcelona commuter railway network.

| Name | Opened | Lines |
|---|---|---|
| Castelldefels railway station | 1881 | R2, R2 Sud |
| Platja de Castelldefels railway station | 1881 | R2 |

=== New railway projects ===
A Barcelona Metro line which was to be numbered L12 was presented in 2002 as part of a major, much-needed revamp of the transportation facilities in the Baix Llobregat part of the metropolitan area. The line, however, was effectively deemed completely unpractical, and dropped out of the final draft for the area, instead requiring a reform of Rodalies Barcelona, with a new line from Castelldefels to L'Hospitalet de Llobregat or Cornellà.

=== Accidents ===
The Castelldefels rail accident occurred on 23 June 2010 when a passenger train struck a group of people who were crossing the railway on the level at Platja de Castelldefels station. Twelve people were killed, and fourteen injured: the majority of the victims were of Latin American origin, particularly from Ecuador. The accident occurred on St. John's Eve, a major celebration in Catalonia as well as in other parts of Spain and in several other European countries. The victims were apparently trying to get to the beach less than 200 metres from the station, where a concert by Ecuadorian singer Rubén de Rey had been organized. It was the worst railway accident in Spain since a collision between a passenger train and a freight train at Chinchilla de Monte-Aragón in June 2003 killed 19 and injured 38 people.

== Bus lines ==
All of the local bus lines are operated by Avanza Spain SL, except the M5 which is operated by Monbus i Julià.

=== Urban buses ===
- CF1 - Castelldefels (Can Roca) - Castelldefels (El Poal)
- CF2 - Castelldefels (Vista Alegre) - Castelldefels (Port Ginesta - Les Botigues)

=== Interurban buses ===
- L94 - Barcelona (Estació de Sants) - Castelldefels (Les Botigues - Pg. Marítim)
- L95 - Barcelona (Ronda Universitat) - Castelldefels (La Muntanyeta)
- L96 - Castelldefels (Bellamar) - Sant Boi de Llobregat (Estació FGC)
- L97 - Barcelona (Maria Cristina) - Castelldefels (El Poal)
- L99 - Castelldefels (Passeig del Pitort) - Aeroport Terminal T1
- M5 - Castelldefels (Av. Constitució) - Cornellà de Llobregat (Intercanviador Cornellà Centre)

=== Express buses ===
- X95 - Barcelona (Pl. Catalunya) - Castelldefels (La Muntanyeta)
- X97 - Barcelona (Maria Cristina) - Castelldefels (Centre)

=== Night buses ===
- N14 - Barcelona Pl. Catalunya - Esplugues de Llobregat- Castelldefels (Centre Vila)
- N16 - Barcelona Pl. Catalunya - Hospital de Bellvitge - Castelldefels (Bellamar)
- N19 - Castelldefels (Passeig del Pitort) - Airport T1/T2 - El Prat de Llobregat (Estació Rodalies)

== See also ==
- Autoritat del Transport Metropolità
- List of Rodalies Barcelona railway stations
- Transport in Barcelona
- Transport in Badalona
- Transport in Cornellà de Llobregat
- Transport in L'Hospitalet de Llobregat
- Transport in Santa Coloma de Gramenet
- Transport in Sant Adrià de Besòs
- Transport in Montcada i Reixac
