= Transport in Esplugues de Llobregat =

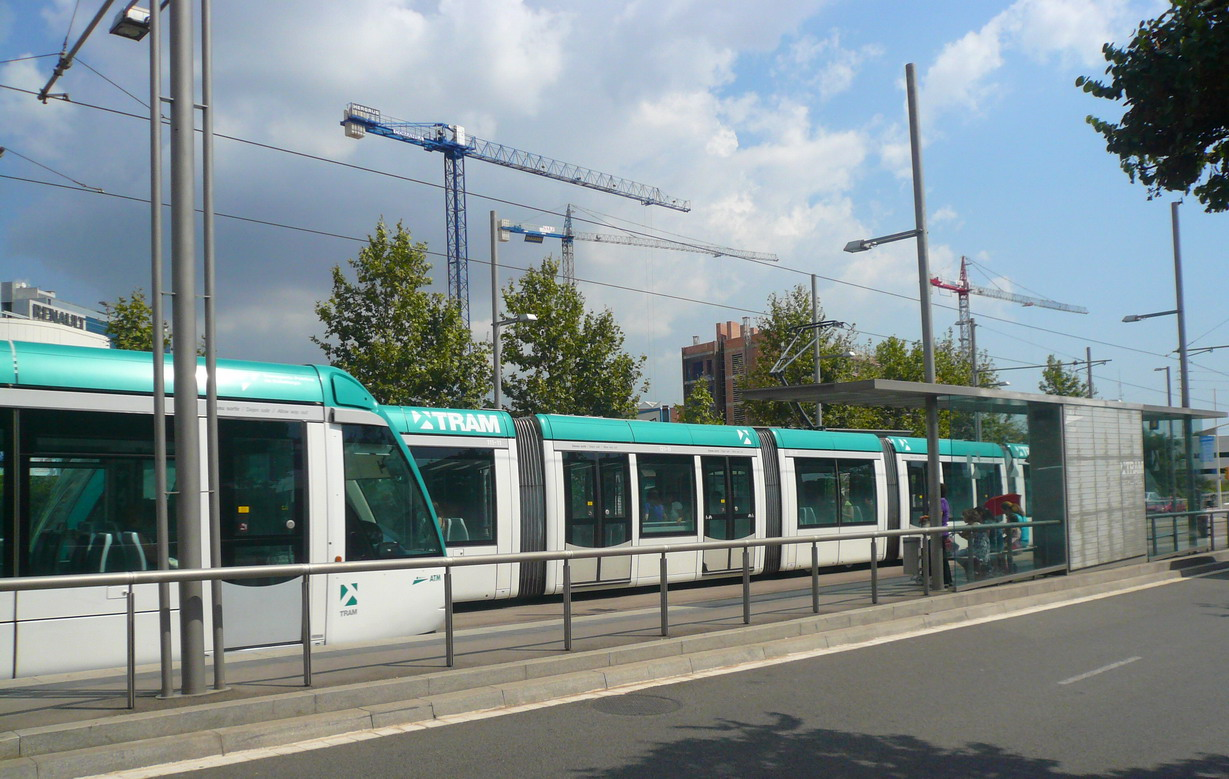
Can Clota Trambaix station in Esplugues.

Public transport in Esplugues de Llobregat (Catalonia, Spain) has been improved in recent years with the introduction of tram lines for the surrounding region in 2004, which provided better interconnection between municipalities and the capital Barcelona. This locality belonging to the Metropolitan Area of Barcelona and located in the comarca of Baix Llobregat (formerly in Barcelonès until 1990) is a wealthy suburb of the neighbouring Barcelona.

== Barcelona Metro stations ==
Located right in the border between the two municipalities of Esplugues de Llobregat and L'Hospitalet de Llobregat, with an only access indeed located in Esplugues:

Name	Opened	Lines	Former name	Other services
Can Vidalet	1982	L5	Maladeta	T1, T2, T3

== Tram stations ==
From the 2000s onwards improved rail connection with Barcelona has existed with the introduction of Trambaix.

Name	Opened	Lines
Ca n'Oliveres	2004	T1, T2, T3
Can Clota	2004	T1, T2, T3
Can Vidalet	2004	T1, T2, T3, L5
La Sardana	2004	T1, T2, T3
Montesa	2004	T1, T2, T3
Pont d'Esplugues	2004	T1, T2, T3

== See also ==
- Transport in Badalona
- Transport in Barcelona
- Transport in Castelldefels
- Transport in Cornellà de Llobregat
- Transport in Montcada i Reixac
