= Transport in Sabadell =

Overview of public transport in Spanish city

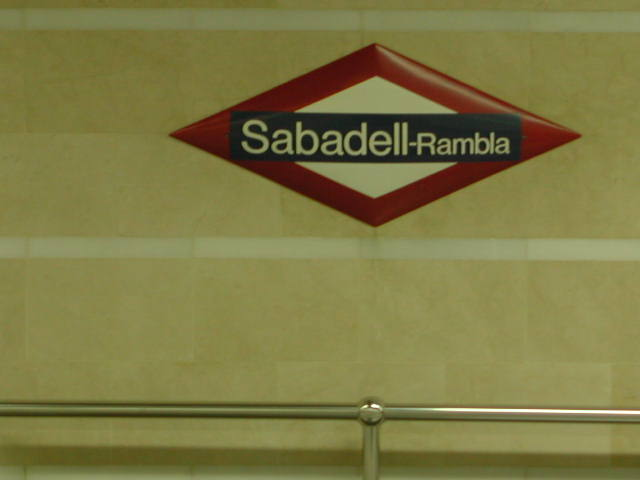
Sabadell Rambla station nameplate.

Public transport in Sabadell (Catalonia, Spain) is provided by several services and companies. The city of Sabadell is one of the biggest in Catalonia, and located in the densely urbanised comarca of Vallès Occidental, making up a conurbation with localities such as Terrassa or Rubí. It is also part of the broader Metropolitan Area of Barcelona, and located on fare zone 2 of the city's transportation authority Autoritat del Transport Metropolità (ATM).

== Ferrocarrils de la Generalitat de Catalunya and Sabadell Metro ==
FGC operates the network known as Metro del Vallès, which serves most towns in the region and which is undergoing important growth. The municipality of Sabadell, a terminus of one of the network's lines, will in its turn include a few new stations, making up the so-called Sabadell Metro.

Name	Opened	Lines	Observations
Sabadell - Estació		S2, Sabadell Metro	To be renamed Gràcia - Can Feu
Sabadell - Rambla		S2	To be replaced by metro
Plaça Major - Centre	Under construction	S2, Sabadell Metro	
Creu Alta - Eix Macià	Under construction	S2, Sabadell Metro	
Plaça d'Espanya		S2, Sabadell Metro	Link with Sabadell Nord
Ca n'Oriac - Nord	Under construction	S2, Sabadell Metro	

== Renfe ==
Name	Opened	Lines
Sabadell Centre		
Sabadell Nord		R4, Ca4b
Sabadell Sud		

== Bus lines ==
Bus services in Sabadell are operated by Transports Urbans de Sabadell (TUS). The network consists of 13 lines.

Name	Termini
L1	Can Deu - Estació Sud
L2	Can Deu - Estació Sud
L3	Can Deu - La Romànica
L4	Castellarnau - Poblenou
L5	Can Rull - Les Termes
L6	Can Roqueta - Can Llong
L7	La Roureda - Can Deu
L8	La Roureda - Zona Industrial
L9	Castellarnau - Estació Centre
L10	Sant Julià - Plaça Barcelona
L11	Gran Via sud - Hospital Taulí
L23	Can Roqueta - Sant Bernat
L80	La Plana del Pintor - Plaça Picasso

== Airport ==
The Sabadell Airport was opened in 1934.

== See also ==
- Transport in Barcelona
- Transport in Terrassa
- Metro del Vallès
