= Transport in Montcada i Reixac =

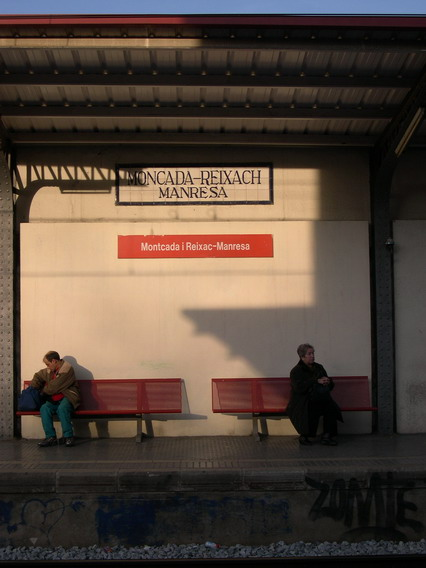
Montcada i Reixac - Manresa railway station.

Public transport in Montcada i Reixac (Catalonia, Spain) is a part of the transportation network in the Metropolitan Area of Barcelona. The town is located in a geographically strategic position, immediately to the north of Barcelona's Nou Barris district and surrounded by the hills of Collserola and the adjacent towns of Vallès, and contains a few train stations which articulate the rail transport in the urban region.

== Barcelona Metro stations ==
Barcelona Metro line L11 links Montcada i Reixac with Nou Barris. In the future it will be extended further into Montcada Centre and other towns in the area.

Name	Opened	Lines
Can Cuiàs	2003	L11

== Railway stations ==
Name	Opened	Operator	Lines
Montcada Bifurcació	1862	Renfe	R3, R4, R7, Ca4b
Montcada i Reixac	1862	Renfe	R2. R2 Nord
Montcada i Reixac - Manresa	1862	Renfe	R4, R7, Ca4b
Montcada i Reixac - Sant Joan	1986	Renfe	R3
Montcada i Reixac - Santa Maria		Renfe	R4, R7, Ca4b
Montcada-Ripollet	1986	Renfe	R3

== Future tram developments ==
A tram spanning the Vallès area, linking it to northern Barcelona and the so-called Metro del Vallès, has been proposed under the name Tramvallès, following the convention initiated with Trambaix (for Baix Llobregat), and Trambesòs (after the Besòs river). As of 2010 it remains under consideration by the Autoritat del Transport Metropolità.

== Transport in other municipalities of the Metropolitan Area of Barcelona ==
- Transport in Badalona
- Transport in Barcelona
- Transport in Cornellà de Llobregat
- Transport in L'Hospitalet de Llobregat
- Transport in Sabadell
- Transport in Sant Cugat del Vallès
- Transport in Terrassa
- Transport in Sant Adrià de Besòs
- Transport in Santa Coloma de Gramenet

== See also ==
- List of Barcelona Metro stations
- Autoritat del Transport Metropolità
