= Sabadell (disambiguation) =

Sabadell is a city in Catalonia.

Sabadell may also refer to:

- Banco Sabadell, a bank
- CE Sabadell FC, a football club
- Sabadell Airport, next to the city of Sabadell, Catalonia
