= ASCAMM =

Technology Park in Vallès, Spain

ASCAMM Foundation is a Technology Center located near Barcelona, at the Vallès Technology Park. the origin of this Foundation was the Catalan Association of Enterprises Mould-Makers and Die-Makers, in Catalan: Associació Catalana d'Empreses constructores de Motlles i Matrius.

== Overview ==
ASCAMM is an active agent within the Spanish research and development to innovation value chain, its objective is to increase the competitiveness of companies in a wide range of industry-based sectors.

The main activities of this non-profit organization are:

- Research and development projects
- Product and process advanced engineering
- Specialized technical and professional training
- Technology transfer
- International co-operation initiatives

The organization currently employs 100 people, mainly engineering graduates and doctors. It was founded in 1987 for research purposes. In 2007, Ascamm had a turnover of 7.3 Million euros. More than 60% of income is from direct innovation services to Small and medium enterprises. The facilities of the technology centre have 6000 m^{2} of built space with top-level laboratories and equipment: injection molding machines, machines for microprocessing, pressure die casting machines, materials laboratory, laser sintering and incremental sheet forming stations, comprehensive CAD/CAM/CAE workstations, complete metalworking workshops and mechatronics.
In the ASCAMM sphere, 3 technology-based spin-off companies have been created: Neosurgery and Hexascreen, oriented to biomedical engineering applications, and Plastiasite, related to knowledge engineering innovative applications. ASCAMM participates actively as RTD performer in the Seventh Framework Programme of the European Union. Likewise, the Center also participates in local (Catalan and Spanish) public funding initiatives.

== Main R&D areas ==
ASCAMM aims at opening new R&D lines to fit industry necessities and opportunities. The center's efforts focus in the application of new or improved technologies by third parties to solve problems and their transfer into potential practical benefits. During the past 20 years ASCAMM has carried stable activity in the following fields:

- Materials: polymers, compounds, shape memory alloys, smart materials...
- Processes: rapid manufacturing, intelligent manufacturing, micro manufacturing, automation, multimaterial and micro-moulding, laser sintering and milling,
- Knowledge: knowledge engineering, collaborative working environments, non-technological innovation approaches, expert systems for industrial processes, knowledge-based engineering, advanced training programmes...

The acquisition of new technologies equipment is done through public funded projects and occasionally by contributions from private companies. Once completed the project goods acquired with public funds remains in Ascamm to provide services to third parties. This have caused conflicts of interests between the services resulting from the activity of Ascamm and business partners to consider that Ascamm makes deslleal competition in its market.

== Accreditations ==
- ASCAMM was the first organization to obtain the label of "Technology Center" from the Department of Labour and Industry of the Generalitat de Catalunya.
- ASCAMM is a CIT (Centre of Innovation and Technology) and an OTRI (Office for the Transfer of Research Results) recognized by the MICINN (Spanish Ministry of Science and Innovation).

== Highlighted memberships ==
- OPTI Foundation (Monitoring Centre for Industrial Technology Foresight): founder-member and leading centre in industrial design and production technologies.
- Founder-member of FEDIT (Spanish Federation of Innovation and Technology Entities).
- Founder-member of ACT (Association for Technological Cooperation).
- ASERM (Spanish Rapid Manufacturing Association).
