= Transport in L'Hospitalet de Llobregat =

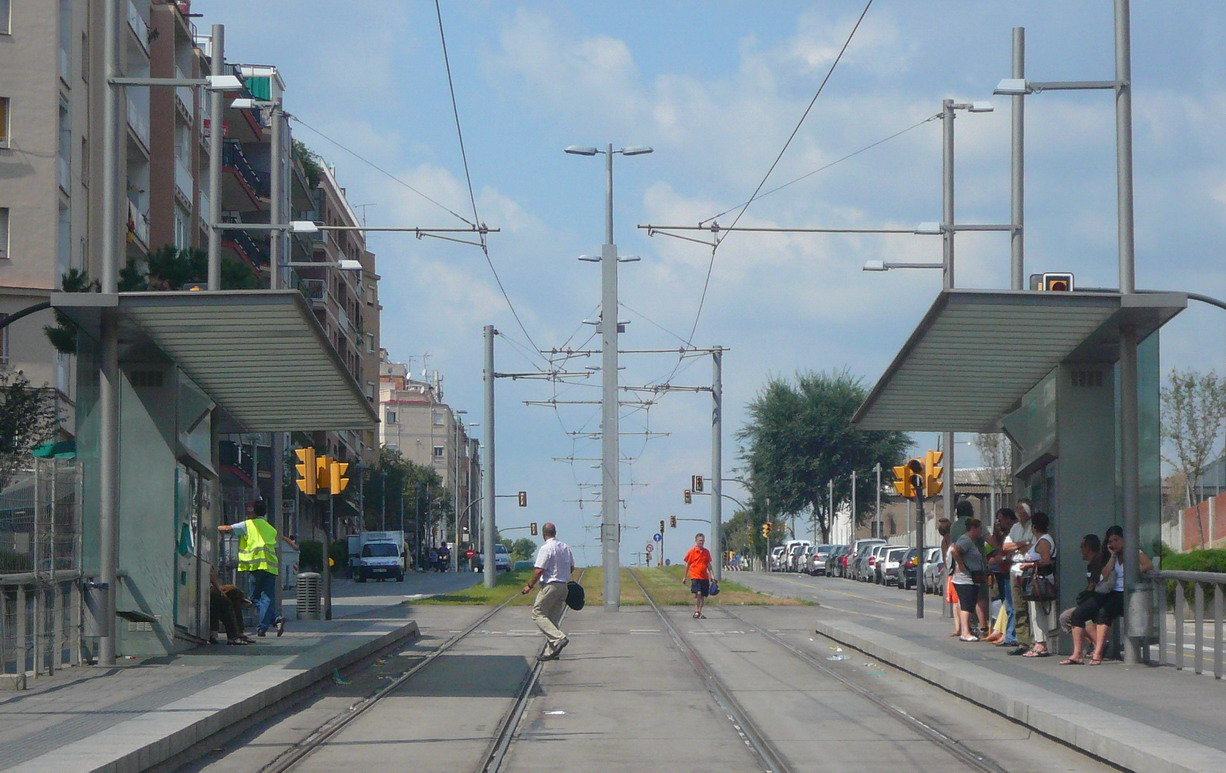
Can Rigal Trambaix station, in L'Hospitalet de Llobregat.

Public transport in L'Hospitalet de Llobregat is operated by several companies, most of which are part of the Autoritat del Transport Metropolità, a transport authority managing services in the metropolitan area of Barcelona. L'Hospitalet is located immediately to the west of Barcelona's Sants-Montjuïc and Les Corts districts, meaning transit between the two cities is quite straightforward, even though it was not fully implemented until late. This article intends to list the different transportation services within limits of the municipality of L'Hospitalet.

== Barcelona Metro stations ==
Stations under construction are listed in italics.

Name	Opened	Lines
Avinguda Carrilet	1987	L1, L8
Bellvitge	1989	L1
Can Boixeres	1976	L5
Can Serra	1987	L1
Can Tries | Gornal	2016	L9, L10
Can Vidalet	1976	L5
Collblanc	1969	L5, L9, L10
Ernest Lluch	2021	L5
Europa-Fira	2007	L8, L9
Fira	2016	L9
Florida	1987	L1
Gornal	1987	L8
Hospital de Bellvitge	1989	L1
Ildefons Cerdà/Ciutat de la Justícia	1987	L8, L10
Pubilla Cases	1973	L5
Provençana	2019	L10
Rambla Just Oliveras	1987	L1
Sant Josep	1985	L8
Santa Eulàlia	1932 (rebuilt on new site in 1983)	L1
Torrassa	1983	L1, L9, L10

== Rodalies Barcelona stations ==
Name	Opened	Lines
Bellvitge	1994 (original structure)	2
L'Hospitalet de Llobregat	1854 (original structure)	1, 3, 4

== Trambaix stations ==
Tram stations within L'Hospitalet.

Name	Opened	Routes
Ernest Lluch	2004	T1, T2, T3
Can Rigal	2004	T1, T2, T3

== Day bus lines ==
=== Intermunicipal buses ===
- L10.-El Prat-L'Hospitalet-Cornellà-Esplugues-St. Joan Despí-St. Just Desvern-St. Feliu
- L11.-L'Hospitalet-Cornellà-St. Joan Despí
- L12.-Cornellà-L'Hospitalet-Barcelona
- L14.-L'Hospitalet-Barcelona
- L16.-L'Hospitalet-Barcelona
- L52.-L'Hospitalet-Cornellà-St. Joan Despí-St. Feliu
- L70.-St. Boi-El Prat-L'Hospitalet-Barcelona
- L72.-St. Boi-El Prat-L'Hospitalet-Barcelona
- L80.-Gavà-Viladecans-El Prat-L'Hospitalet-Barcelona
- L82.-Gavà-Viladecans-St. Boi-Cornellà-L'Hospitalet
- L85.-Gavà-Viladecans-St. Boi-Cornellà-L'Hospitalet
- L86.-Viladecans-St. Boi-El Prat-L'Hospitalet-Barcelona
- L94.-Castelldefels-Gavà-El Prat-L'Hospitalet-Barcelona
- L95.-Castelldefels-Gavà-El Prat-L'Hospitalet-Barcelona

=== Autobusos de Barcelona ===
- Operated by Autobusos de Barcelona.
- H12.-L'Hospitalet-Barcelona
- V1.-L'Hospitalet-Barcelona
- 46.-Aeroport-L'Hospitalet-Barcelona
- 65.-El Prat-L'Hospitalet-Barcelona
- 79.-L'Hospitalet-Barcelona
- 157.-St. Joan Despí-St. Just Desvern-Esplugues-L'Hospitalet

=== L'Hospitalet-only buses ===
Operated by Rosanbus.

- L'H1
- L'H2

== Night bus lines ==
- N2.-L'Hospitalet-Barcelona-St. Adrià-Badalona
- N13.-St. Boi-Cornellà-L'Hospitalet-Barcelona
- N14.-Castelldefels-Gavà-Viladecans-St. Boi-Cornellà-Esplugues-L'Hospitalet-Barcelona
- N15.-St. Joan Despí-Cornellà-L'Hospitalet-Barcelona
- N16.-Castelldefels-Gavà-Viladecans-L'Hospitalet-Barcelona
- N17.-Aeroport-El Prat-L'Hospitalet-Barcelona
- N18.-Aeroport-L'Hospitalet-Barcelona

== Coach stations ==
- L'Hospitalet de Llobregat coach station is located near Santa Eulàlia metro station, at 33 Carrer de Santa Eulàlia (08902).

== Transport in the municipalities of Barcelonès ==
- Transport in Badalona
- Transport in Barcelona
- Transport in Sant Adrià de Besòs
- Transport in Santa Coloma de Gramenet

== Transport in other municipalities of the Metropolitan Area ==
- Transport in Castelldefels
- Transport in Cornellà de Llobregat
- Transport in Esplugues de Llobregat
- Transport in Gavà
- Transport in Montcada i Reixac
- Transport in Sant Boi de Llobregat
- Transport in Sant Cugat del Vallès
- Transport in Sant Feliu de Llobregat
- Transport in Sant Joan Despí
- Transport in Sant Just Desvern
- Transport in Viladecans

== See also ==
- Autoritat del Transport Metropolità
