= TramVallès =

TramVallès, Tramvallès or Tramvia del Vallès is a proposed tram or light rail network in the metropolitan area of Barcelona (Catalonia, Spain). Its name stems from the region of Vallès, which spans two counties north of the Catalan capital. The region is densely populated, includes the Autonomous University of Barcelona and current public transport services are insufficient for commuters. Following expressions of citizen support, the Generalitat de Catalunya, the governing body of Catalonia, approved the project in 2010. Tramvallès would serve the following municipalities: Montcada i Reixac, Ripollet, Cerdanyola del Vallès, Badia del Vallès, Sant Cugat del Vallès, Barberà del Vallès, Sabadell and Terrassa.

== The project ==
The first draft approved by the Generalitat de Catalunya is a 10 km stretch between Montcada i Reixac towards the Autonomous University of Barcelona in Bellaterra (Cerdanyola del Vallès). However, Plataforma pel Tramvallès demands a 32 km system to be implemented in the area, as proposed by the Plataforma per la Promoció del Transport Públic.

== The line as proposed by Generalitat de Catalunya ==
Name	Municipality	Transport connections
Montcada Ripollet	Montcada i Reixac-Ripollet	R3
Polígon Ripollet	Ripollet	
Cerdanyola del Vallès	Cerdanyola del Vallès	R4
Cerdanyola Centre	Cerdanyola del Vallès	
Sant Ramon	Cerdanyola del Vallès	
Centre Direccional	Cerdanyola del Vallès	
Cerdanyola Universitat	Cerdanyola del Vallès	R7, R8
Facultat de Ciències	Cerdanyola del Vallès	
Universitat Autònoma	Cerdanyola del Vallès	S2

== The line as proposed by Plataforma per la Promoció del Transport Públic ==
Name	Municipality	Transport connections
Montcada Ripollet	Montcada i Reixac-Ripollet	R3
Polígon Ripollet	Ripollet	
Cerdanyola del Vallès	Cerdanyola del Vallès	R4
Cerdanyola Centre	Cerdanyola del Vallès	
Sant Ramon	Cerdanyola del Vallès	
Centre Direccional	Cerdanyola del Vallès	
Cerdanyola Universitat	Cerdanyola del Vallès	R7, R8
Facultat de Ciències	Cerdanyola del Vallès	
Universitat Autònoma	Cerdanyola del Vallès	S2
Badia del Vallès	Badia del Vallès	
Barberà Estació	Barberà del Vallès	R4
Barberà Centre	Barberà del Vallès	
Can Llobet	Barberà del Vallès	
Avinguda de Barberà	Sabadell	
Eixample	Sabadell	
Sabadell Rambla	Sabadell	S2
Sabadell Estació	Sabadell	S2
Can Rull	Sabadell	
Hospital de Terrassa	Terrassa	
Terrassa Est	Terrassa	
Polígon del Nord	Terrassa	
Poblenou	Terrassa	
Can Boada	Terrassa	R4
Terrassa Rambla	Terrassa	R4

== See also ==
- Transport in Montcada i Reixac
- Autoritat del Transport Metropolità
- Metropolitan area of Barcelona
- Trambaix
- Trambesòs
- Tramvia Blau
