= Transport in Santa Coloma de Gramenet =

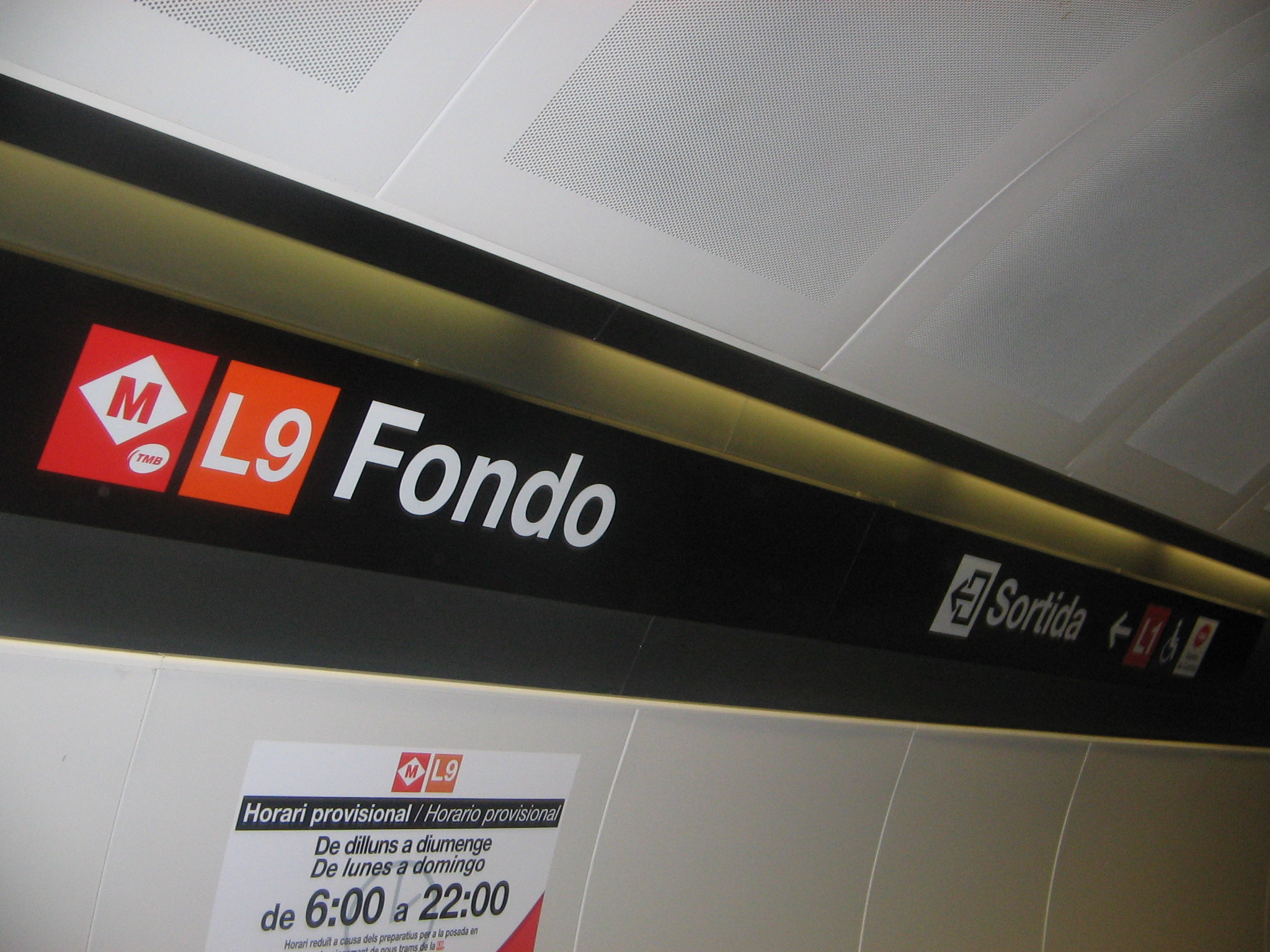
Barcelona Metro line L9 has become an important part of Santa Coloma's transport infrastructure.

Public transport in Santa Coloma de Gramenet (Catalonia, Spain) is an important part of the Metropolitan Area of Barcelona transportation network. Santa Coloma is a densely populated suburb of the city of Barcelona which fulfills both the role of dormitory town and one of the biggest settlements in the capital's urban area, at around 120,000 inhabitants, and is straddled by Barcelona's Nou Barris and Sant Andreu districts, Badalona, Sant Adrià de Besòs and Montcada i Reixac. The town still relies mostly on bus lines for transportation, but essential improvement arrived in late 2009 with the partial construction of Barcelona Metro line L9. In the future, Generalitat de Catalunya will construct a new line of Tram.

== Barcelona Metro stations ==
Name	Opened	Lines
Can Peixauet	2009	L9
Can Zam	2009	L9
Església Major	2009	L9
Fondo	1992	L1, L9
Santa Coloma	1983	L1
Santa Rosa	2011	L9
Singuerlín	2009	L9

== Bus lines ==
Operated by Transports Metropolitans de Barcelona and Tusgsal:

Bus lines running through Santa Coloma
Day services
B1	Santa Coloma (Metro Fondo) - Badalona (Av. Martí Pujol)
B2	Badalona (Manresà) - Santa Coloma (Hospital Esperit Sant)
B14	Santa Coloma (Can Franquesa) - Sant Adrià de Besós (estació Rodalies - TRAM)
B15	Santa Coloma (Les Oliveres) - Badalona (C.C. Montigalà)
B18	Santa Coloma (Can Peixauet) - Montcada i Reixac (Pl. Lluís Companys)
B19	Barcelona (Hosp. Vall d'Hebron) - Santa Coloma - Badalona (Hosp. Can Ruti)
B20	Barcelona (Ronda de Sant Pere) - Santa Coloma (Les Oliveres)
B24	Badalona (Hosp. Can Ruti) - Santa Coloma - Barcelona (Ronda de Sant Pere)
B27	Badalona (Francesc Layret) - Santa Coloma (Les Oliveres)
B28	Badalona (Hosp. Can Ruti) - Barcelona (Sant Andreu)
B30	Santa Coloma (Can Franquesa) - Tiana (La Virreina)
B80	Santa Coloma (Can Franquesa) - Santa Coloma (Santa Eulàlia)
B81	Santa Coloma (Can Franquesa) - Santa Coloma (Hospital Esperit Sant)
B82	Santa Coloma (Torribera) - Badalona (El Carme)
B84	Santa Coloma (Santa Rosa) - Santa Coloma (Cementiri)
Night services
N6	Roquetes - Pl. Catalunya - Santa Coloma (Les Oliveres)
N8	Sarrià - Pl. Catalunya - Santa Coloma (Can Franquesa)
N9	Pl. Portal de la Pau - Pl. Catalunya - Santa Coloma - Tiana
TMB day services
V33	Barcelona (Fòrum) - Santa Coloma (Santa Rosa)

== Transport in the municipalities of Barcelonès ==
- Transport in Barcelona
- Transport in L'Hospitalet de Llobregat
- Transport in Badalona
- Transport in Sant Adrià de Besòs
- Transport in Montcada i Reixac

== Transport in other Metropolitan Area municipalities ==
- Transport in Cornellà de Llobregat

== See also ==
- List of Barcelona Metro stations
- Autoritat del Transport Metropolità
