= Transport in Barcelona =

Overview of public transportation in Barcelona

Public transport in Barcelona (Catalonia, Spain) is operated by several companies, most of which are part of the Autoritat del Transport Metropolità, a transport authority managing services in the Barcelonès and the rest of the metropolitan area of Barcelona. This article is a summary with transport facilities and services strictly within the municipality of Barcelona, and contains links to more specific articles.

== Railway ==
Barcelona was the first major city in Spain where trains were implemented. The first line in the country ran from Mataró to Barcelona. After permission was granted by the government, it was built between 1845 and 1848. High-speed train services (AVE and Avant) were introduced by Renfe in 2008.

=== Commuter rail ===
Map of Rodalies Barcelona and FGC lines.

Currently railway lines in Barcelona are owned by Renfe and Ferrocarrils de la Generalitat de Catalunya (FGC). Rodalies Barcelona is a commuter railway network serving the metropolitan area. It's presently operated by Renfe and FGC even though the latter will operate all Rodalies lines from 2010 onwards, alongside its other commuter lines. Altogether they will make up 15 lines.

=== Regional lines ===
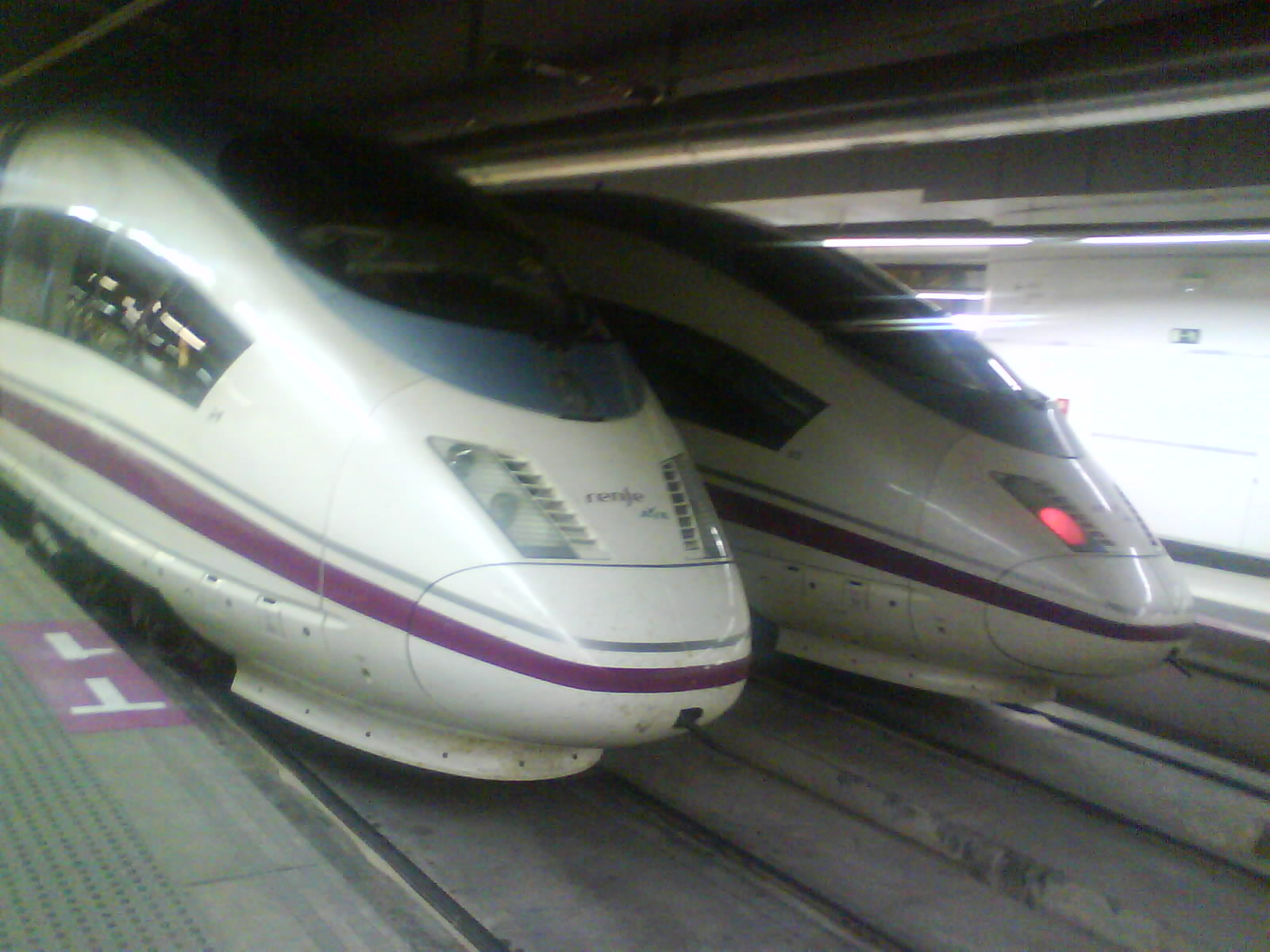
Siemens Velaro designed for speeds of 310 km/h (194 mph) at Barcelona-Sants AVE station.

Mitjana distància or Media distancia Renfe (in Catalan or Spanish (also called Catalunya Exprés: Ca lines) there are 9 lines (Ca1-Ca2-Ca3-Ca4-Ca5-Ca6-Ca7-R43-L7). Those lines go all around of the four Catalan provinces and some of them go to Zaragoza (Aragón) and Castelló de la Plana and València in País Valencià. Lines are operated by:

- Renfe Operadora: 8 lines (broad gauge) and one of standard gauge:
  - Barcelona – Tarragona – Salou – Tortosa (with some expeditions to Vinaròs and València Nord)
  - Barcelona – Girona – Figueres – Portbou – Cervera de la Marenda (France)
  - Barcelona – Tarragona – Reus – Riba-Roja d'Ebre (with some expeditions to Caspe and Zaragoza-Delicias)
  - Barcelona – Lleida-Pirineus
    - by Montblanc (via Reus)
    - by Montblanc (via Valls).
    - by Manresa and Cervera.
  - Barcelona – Puigcerdà Latour-de-Carol (France)
  - Barcelona – Caspe – Zaragoza-Delicias
  - Lleida-Pirineus – Monzón – Zaragoza-Delicias
  - Tortosa – L'Aldea-Amposta – València Nord
  - Avant Barcelona Sants – Camp de Tarragona – Lleida-Pirineus
1. All Barcelona trains start in Estació de França or Barcelona Sants.
2. That line was trespassed to U.N. Rodalies and now is considered a Rodalies Barcelona line 3 enlargement.

=== Railway stations ===
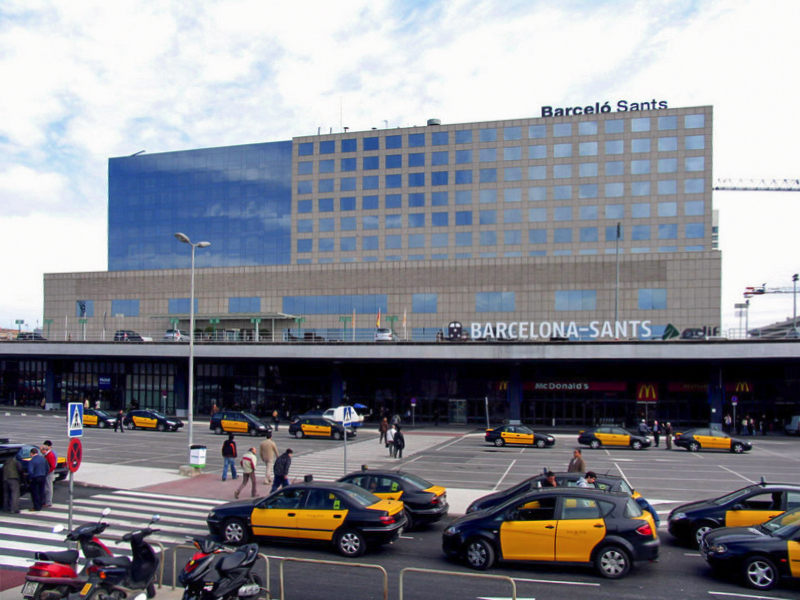
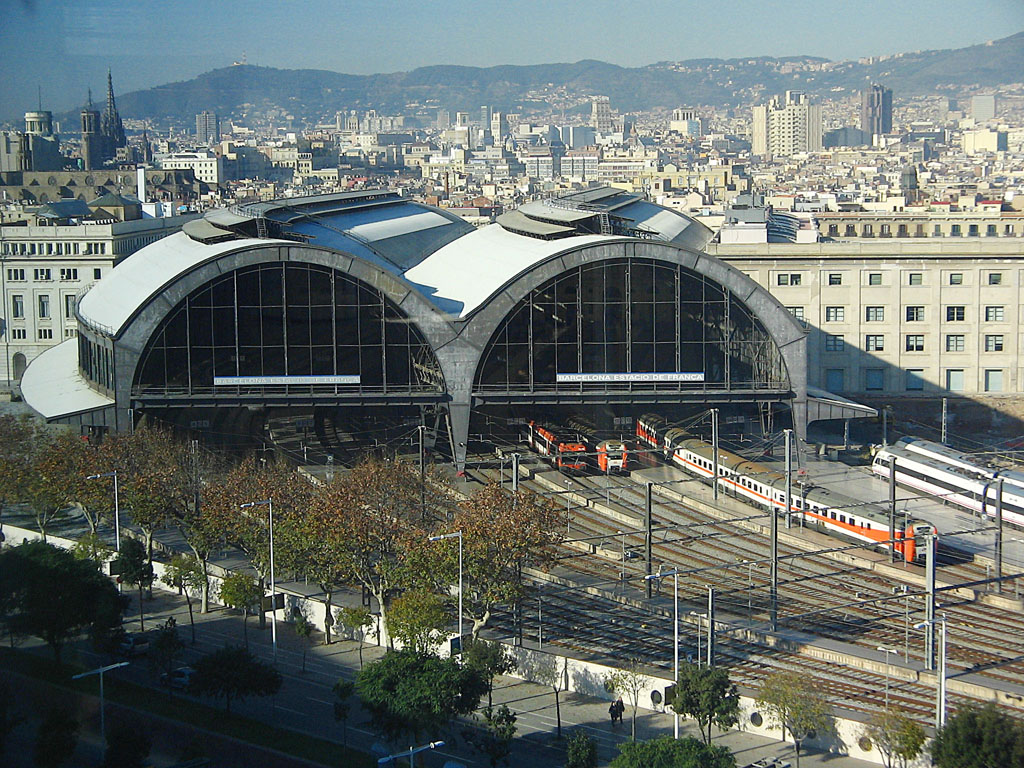
Two main railway stations of Barcelona: Barcelona Sants railway station and Barcelona Estació de França.

There are currently 27 open railway stations in Barcelona (228 in the metropolitan area). The city's current main terminal station is Barcelona Sants. The construction of Estació de la Sagrera, presently taking place in La Sagrera and designed by Frank Gehry, will be a station of equal importance serving the other side of the city. Among other main stations, Estació de França has seen its importance reduced in the past years, and Estació del Nord (next to Arc de Triomf) is no longer a railway terminal but a coach station and athletic facility. El Clot-Aragó station was planned to be replaced by a new Glòries railway station at Plaça de les Glòries Catalanes which would be one of the main transport hubs in the city when completed, but Plaça de Catalunya railway station, in the centre of Barcelona (Plaça de Catalunya) is the only station in Barcelona where Renfe, FGC and Barcelona Metro lines join.

All FGC stations except for those between Peu del Funicular and Les Planes also offer Barcelona Metro services, although trains operate every 6 minutes on workdays and 10 on weekdays, which is a better service than the L11 schedule.

== Public transportation ==
=== Barcelona Metro ===
Barcelona Metro map

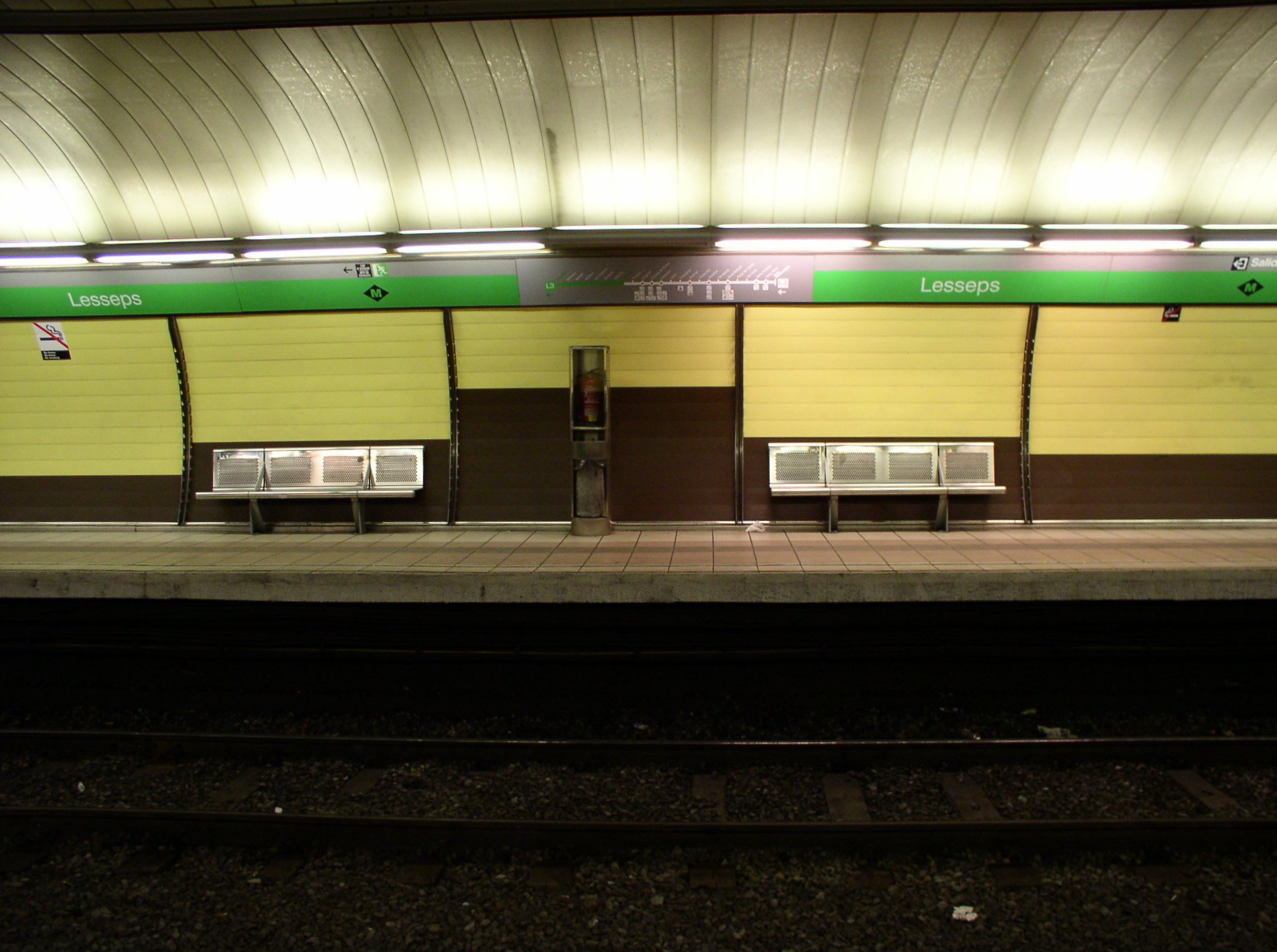
Lesseps station

The Barcelona Metro, an electrified railway network, has served the city since 1924, when the Gran Metro and Metro Transversal took place. The original project was devised in time for the 1929 Universal Exhibition which took place in the city. Nowadays it is operated by two different companies: the proper metro lines being part of the Transports Metropolitans de Barcelona (or TMB) network, and three metro services integrated in the commuter railway network of Ferrocarrils de la Generalitat de Catalunya (or FGC), Catalonia's public railway company.

In addition to the eleven current working lines, the network is currently being expanded with the introduction of a double metro line which will be the longest in continental Europe: L9/L10. Nearly all existing lines are also growing, some extensively like L2, and as of 2014 they are undergoing reforms.

As of February 2016, the metro network consists of:

Line	Termini	Opened in	Length in km	Stations
L1	Hospital de Bellvitge – Fondo	1926	20.72	30
L2	Paral·lel – Badalona Pompeu Fabra	1995	13.53	18
L3	Zona Universitària – Trinitat Nova	1924	19.22	26
L4	Trinitat Nova – La Pau	1926	18.91	22
L5	Cornellà Centre – Vall d'Hebron	1959	19.16	27
L6	Pça Catalunya – Reina Elisenda	1863	5.38	9
L7	Plaça Catalunya – Avinguda Tibidabo	1954	4.63	7
L8	Plaça Espanya – Ciutat Cooperativa	1912	11.26	11
L9N	La Sagrera – Can Zam	2009	11.1	9
L9S	Zona Universitaria – Aeroport T1	2016	20	15
L10N	La Sagrera – Gorg	2010	8,1	6
L10S	Collblanc – Zona Franca	2010	8,1	6
L11	Trinitat Nova – Can Cuiàs	2003	2.1	5
Total			157.51	209

=== Trams ===
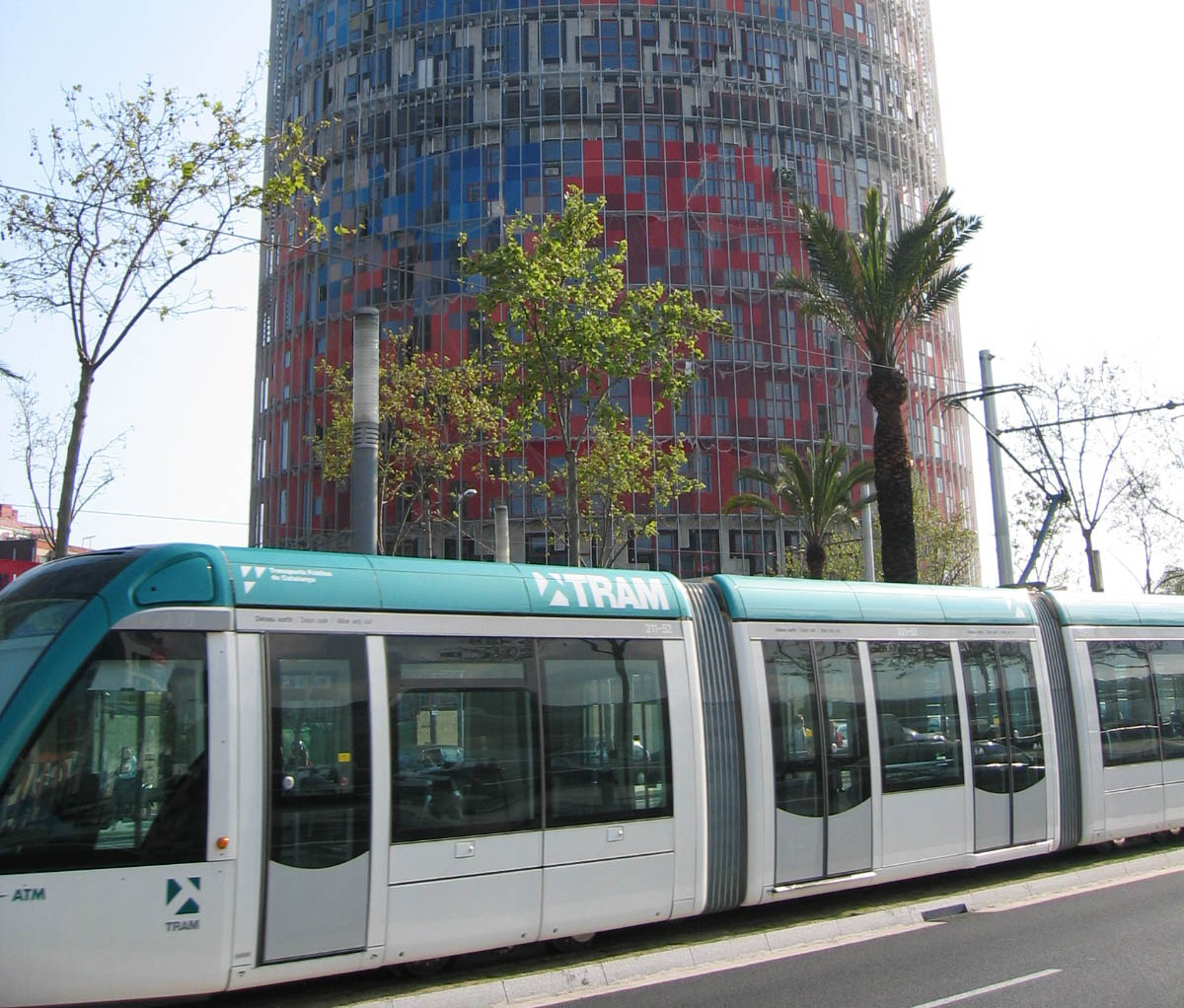
Trambesòs carriage by Glòries and the Torre Agbar.

Although Barcelona had an extensive tram network (operated by Tramways de Barcelona S.A., a distant antecessor of Transports Metropolitans de Barcelona) during the 20th century, and was highly dependent on trams, as the 1951 tram boycott proves, the tram network was upgraded in the early 1960s with the acquisition of a total of 101 PCC type tram cars from the DC Transit system of Washington, DC. Tram service was eventually discontinued in 1971, except for the Tramvia Blau on the Tibidabo. In 2004, however, two new tram systems were introduced: Trambaix (taking its name from the Baix Llobregat comarca, the western part of the metropolitan area), and the Trambesòs, from the river Besòs which runs through the eastern part). Both systems have three routes each (as of 2009), but new introductions are expected and pending approval. An ambitious project to link the whole of Barcelona through Avinguda Diagonal and linking both systems is pending revision.

=== Buses ===
Buses in Barcelona are a major form of public transport in Barcelona, with an extensive local and interurban bus network. There is also a network of night buses called Nitbus and a bus rapid transit system called RetBus is being set up, which is intended to complement the current local bus network. All bus routes serving Barcelona metropolitan area are organized by Autoritat del Transport Metropolità (ATM). Local services are operated in most part by Transports Metropolitans de Barcelona (TMB), although other bus services are operated by several private companies under common names.

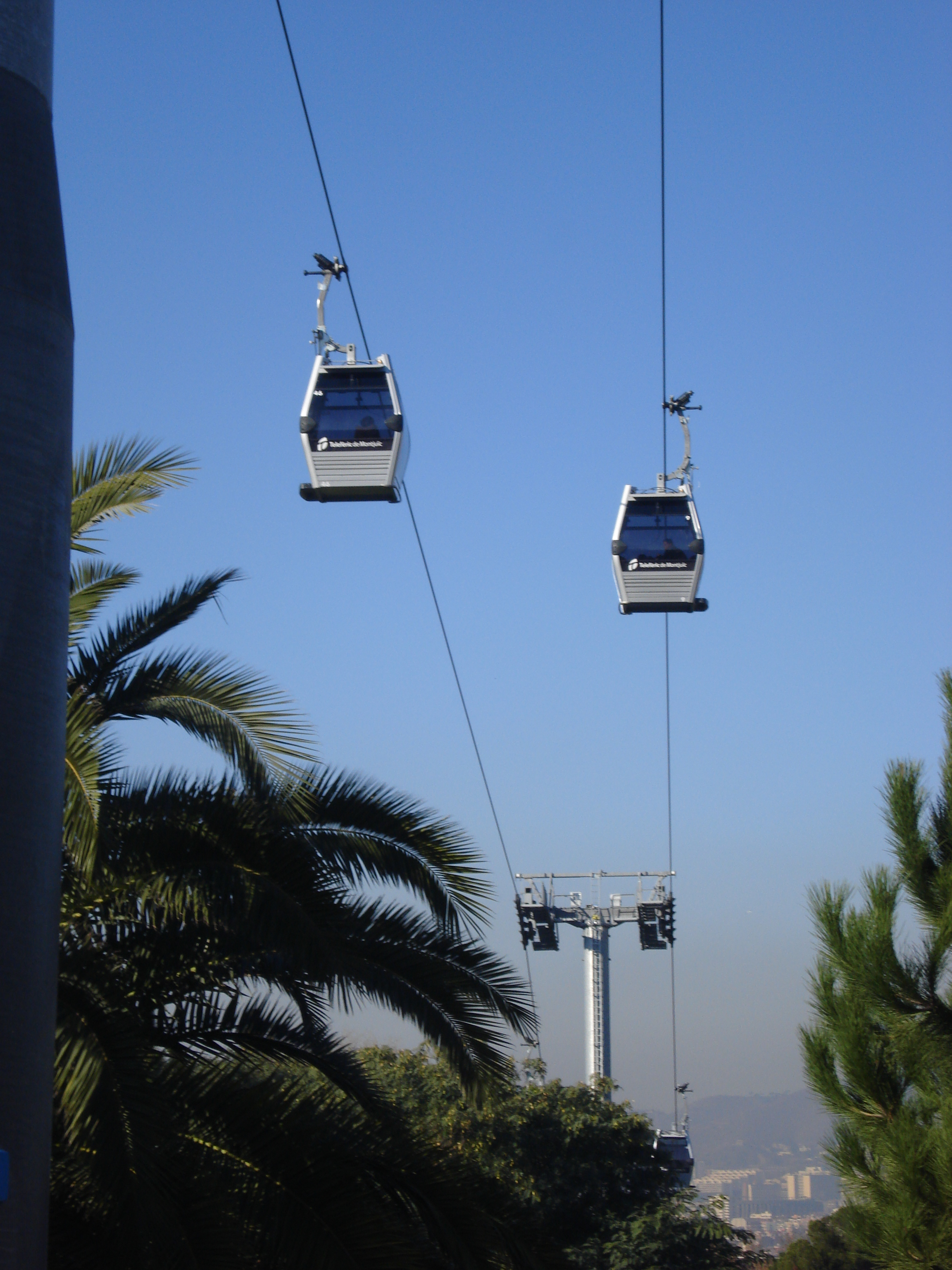
Montjuïc Aerial Tramway

=== Funicular ===
The Funicular de Montjuïc, climbing up Montjuïc hill, is fare-integrated with the Barcelona Metro network. Funicular de Vallvidrera, in Vallvidrera, is part of Ferrocarrils de la Generalitat de Catalunya. A third funicular, on Tibidabo hill, Funicular del Tibidabo, is operated by TMB and allows access to the Tibidabo theme park.

=== Aerial tramways / Cable cars ===
The city has two aerial cable cars: Montjuïc Aerial Tramway (to the Montjuïc castle) and Port Vell Aerial Tramway that runs via Torre Jaume I and Torre Sant Sebastià over the port. Also, in the metropolitan area of Barcelona work Aeri de Montserrat and Telefèric d'Olesa a Esparreguera.

=== Private car traffic ===
Barcelona is encouraging active travel (walking and wheeling plus use of the bus) with the "Superblocks" system which discourages short trips by private car. They are the idea of Salvador Rueda, a psychologist, engineer and ecologist and have the support of the city council. See Barcelona's super·illes in City block.

=== Statistics ===
The Metropolitan Transport Authority reported 1,024.8 million passengers transported by public transit in 2018.

The average amount of time people spend commuting on public transit in Barcelona, for example to and from work, on a weekday is 50 min. 8% of public transit riders, ride for more than 2 hours every day. The average amount of time people wait at a stop or station for public transit is 10 min, while 9% of riders wait for over 20 minutes on average every day. The average distance people usually ride in a single trip with public transit is 7.2 km, while 15% travel for over 12 km in a single direction.

In 2023, the European Investment Bank invested €25 million in Barcelona's rolling stock and signed an advisory service agreement with Transports Metropolitans de Barcelona (TMB) to improve transport security against harassment.

== Air ==
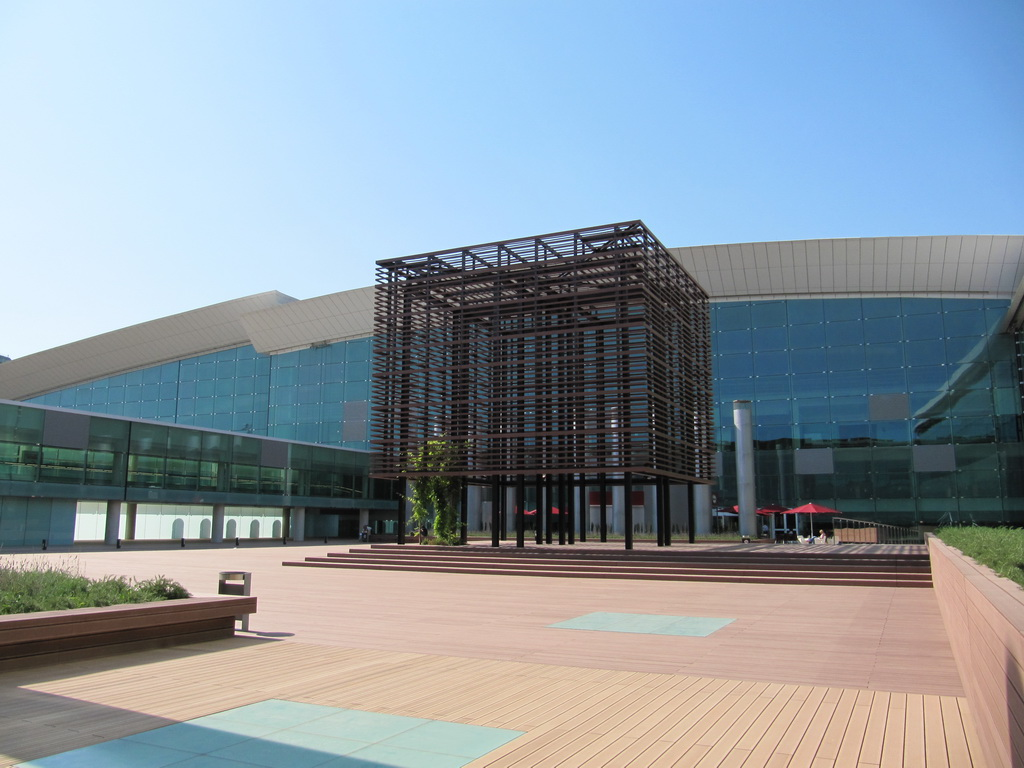
Outside view of Terminal 1 of Barcelona Airport

Barcelona is served by Barcelona Airport situated in the suburbs, about 17 km (11 mi) from the centre of Barcelona. It is the second-largest airport in Spain, and the largest on the Mediterranean coast. It is a main hub for Vueling Airlines and a focus for Air Europa and Iberia. The airport mainly serves domestic and European destinations, but some airlines offer destinations in Asia and the United States. The airport is connected to the city centre by highway, commuter train and scheduled bus service. The airport handled 35,145,176 passengers in 2012. A new terminal (T1) has been built, and entered service on 17 June 2009.

Sabadell Airport is a smaller airport situated in the suburbs, devoted to pilot training, aerotaxi and private flights. Some low-cost airlines, such as Transavia and Ryanair, prefer to use Girona-Costa Brava Airport, situated about 90 km (56 mi) to the north of Barcelona, the Reus Airport situated 77 km (48 mi) to the south, though they offer some flights from Barcelona-El Prat Airport and also Lleida-Alguaire Airport situated about 150 km (93 mi) to the west of the city. The city airport system, measured by passenger traffic, is one of busiest city airport systems in Europe, having nearly 40 million passengers per year.

Airport	Code	Total passengers (2012)	Aircraft movements (2012)	Cargo traffic (2012)
Barcelona Airport	BCN	35,145,176	290,004	96,519,698
Girona-Costa Brava Airport	GRO	2,844,682	27,674	133,910
Reus Airport	REU	937,446	16,111	14,104
Sabadell Airport	---	602	29,042	900
Lleida-Alguaire Airport	ILD	n/d	n/d	n/d
Total	n/a	38,927,906	362,831	96,668,612

== Sea ==
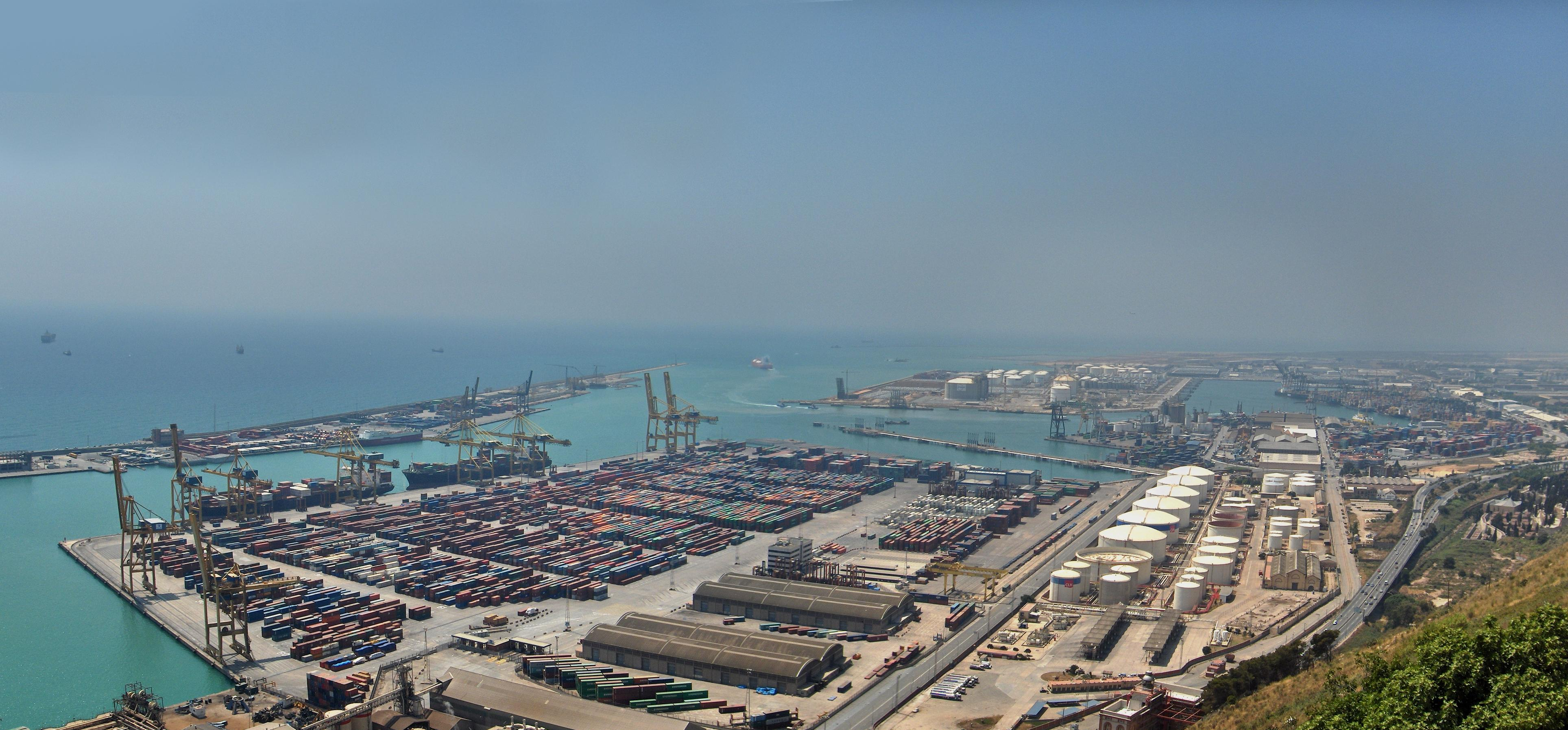
Port of Barcelona

The Port of Barcelona has a 2000-year history and a great contemporary commercial importance. It is Europe's ninth largest container port, with a trade volume of 2.3 million TEU's in 2006. The port is managed by the Port Authority of Barcelona. Its 7.86 km^{2} (3 sq mi) are divided into three zones: Port Vell (the Old Port), the commercial port and the logistics port (Barcelona Free Port). The port is undergoing an enlargement that will double its size thanks to diverting the mouth of the Llobregat river 2 km (1¼ mi) to the South.

- Barcelona Free Port (Zona Franca)
- Port Olímpic de Barcelona
- Port de Barcelona
- Port Vell
- Royal Barcelona Yacht Club

== Transport in the metropolitan area ==
- Transport in Badalona
- Transport in L'Hospitalet de Llobregat
- Transport in Sant Adrià de Besòs
- Transport in Santa Coloma de Gramenet
- Transport in Castelldefels
- Transport in Cornellà de Llobregat
- Transport in Esplugues de Llobregat
- Transport in Montcada i Reixac

== See also ==
- Bicing
- List of FGC lines
- Rail transport in Catalonia
- Sabadell Metro and Terrassa Metro as extensions to S1 and S2
