= Castelldefels train accident =

2010 disaster in Catalonia, Spain

Coordinates: 41.2670°N 1.9571°E

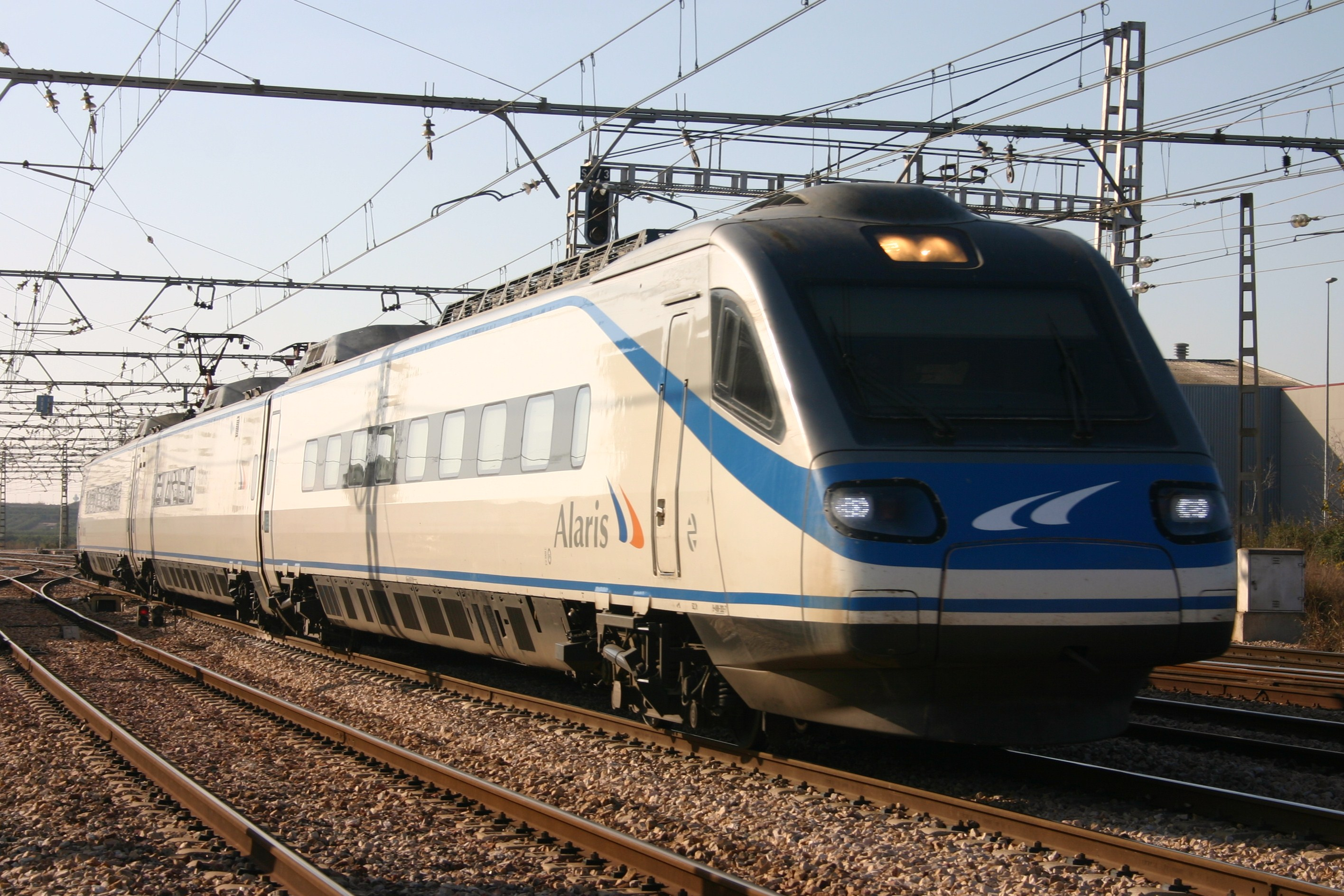
- A Renfe series 490 trainset

Details
- Date: 23 June 2010; 23:23 CEST (UTC+2)
- Location: Platja de Castelldefels railway station 23 km (14 mi) SW from Barcelona
- Country: Spain
- Line: Madrid–Barcelona
- Operator: Renfe Operadora
- Incident type: Collision with people on the line

Statistics
- Trains: 1
- Deaths: 12
- Injured: 14

The Castelldefels train accident occurred on 23 June 2010 when a passenger train struck a group of people who were crossing the railway on the level at Platja de Castelldefels station to the southwest of Barcelona, in Catalonia, Spain. Twelve people were killed, and fourteen injured: all victims but one Romanian were of Latin American origin, with a majority from Ecuador.

The accident occurred on St. John's Eve, a major celebration in Spain and in several other European countries. The victims were apparently trying to get to the beach less than 200 metres (660 ft) from the station, where a concert by Ecuadorian singer Rubén de Rey had been organized. It was the worst railway accident in Spain since the Valencia Metro derailment in July 2006 killed 43 and injured 47 others.

== Accident ==
At 23:23 local time (21:23 UTC), an express train ploughed into a large group of people crossing the track at Platja de Castelldefels station, killing 12 of them and injuring 14. Three of the injured were said to be in critical condition. The people crossing the line had just alighted from a full commuter train at the station and were crossing the track to get to the beach. The train involved in the accident was a Renfe Alaris ETR 490 electric multiple unit, and was travelling at about 139 km/h (86 mph), below the speed limit of 150 km/h (93 mph) for that section of track.

Emergency services sent 24 ambulances and 15 fire service vehicles to the scene. The injured were dispatched to three hospitals in Barcelona: L'Hospitalet de Llobregat, Sant Joan Despí, and Viladecans. The force of the impact was such that rescue workers faced difficulties in reassembling the body parts. The line was closed following the accident, reopening at 12:30 CEST (10:30 UTC) the following day.

== Initial reports ==
Initial reports said that a pedestrian underpass under the line was closed, although a footbridge over the line was available for use. This was denied by official sources including Adif, the company which operates the station, and the mayor of Castelldefels, Joan Sau. The Regional Minister for Public Works, Joaquim Nadal, said that the footbridge had been chained off, although he suggested that climbing over the chain had "the same grade of physical difficulty" as crossing the tracks. The Spanish Ministry of Transport estimated that there were up to 800 passengers at the station at the time of the accident. Regional president José Montilla said that "we shall have to see if the underpass was overcrowded or not", while local newspaper El Periódico speculated that many of the people crossing the track might not have realised that, at the other end of the platform, there was an underpass which had only been open since November 2009. A member of the Ecuadorean consulate in Barcelona, who had managed to cross the tracks with his family just before the accident, said that the signposting of the exits from the platform was "inadequate".

== Investigations ==
At least four separate investigations were announced in the hours following the accident. The Spanish Minister for Transport, José Blanco, and his deputy Víctor Morlán, announced a commission of inquiry which will report to the Spanish and the regional governments, while Renfe Operadora, who operated the train involved in the accident, and Adif, the state company in charge of railway infrastructure (including the Platja de Castelldefels station), announced internal inquiries. A judicial inquiry into the deaths and injuries has also been opened by the duty judge in the nearby town of Gavà, whose judicial district covers Castelldefels.

Nationality	Fatalities
Ecuador	7
Bolivia	2
Colombia	2
Romania	1
Total	12

The identification of the victims, under the authority of the Gavà judge, proved unusually onerous, and there was initially some confusion as to the exact number of dead. Nearly 24 hours after the accident, the regional government reported that there were thirteen immediate fatalities in the accident and not twelve as originally thought: The number of fatalities was later reduced to 12 after further investigation. The Catalan Justice Minister Montserrat Tura graphically explained the difficulties facing the 19 pathologists and 21 other forensic scientists assigned to the case: "We don't have twelve bodies, but rather twenty sacks of remains." The Spanish authorities had to request the assistance of Interpol to formally identify the body of a 30-year-old Romanian woman who had no immediate family in Spain.

== Reactions ==
Regional President José Montilla declared 24 June 2010 a day of official mourning in the region after visiting the scene of the accident and praising the response of the emergency services. King Juan Carlos cancelled the reception he traditionally hosts on 24 June for St. John's Day, his saint's day.

A memorial gathering with a minute's silence was organized on 26 June at the Arc de Triomf in Barcelona by associations of Ecuadorian and Colombian immigrants. The mayor of Barcelona, Jordi Hereu, and the Ecuadorian ambassador to Spain, Galo Chiriboga, attended the memorial.

== See also ==
- List of rail accidents (2010–2019)
- List of Spanish rail accidents
- Transport in Castelldefels
