= Transport in Cornellà de Llobregat =

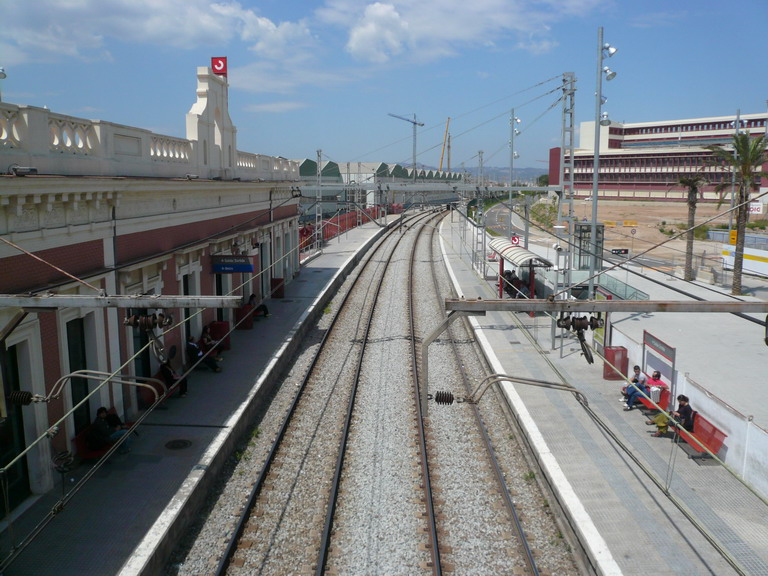
Cornellà de Llobregat railway station, operated by Renfe (Rodalies Barcelona).

Public transport in Cornellà de Llobregat (Catalonia, Spain, Cornellà henceforth) is an important part of the transportation network spanning the Metropolitan Area of Barcelona. The city of Cornellà, a mostly working-class area with strong dormitory town traits, is one of the most populated in the Baix Llobregat with about 90,000 inhabitants and a daily destination for thousands of commuters in the urban area of the capital.

== Barcelona Metro stations ==
Barcelona Metro line L5 is operated by Transports Metropolitans de Barcelona (TMB) and is a regular rapid transit line. On the other hand, L8 is a Ferrocarrils de la Generalitat de Catalunya (FGC) service which grew out of a former commuter line, adapted to the standards, schedules and frequency of metro lines.

Name	Opened	Lines
Almeda	1985	L8
Cornellà Centre	1983	L5
Cornellà-Riera	1985	L8
Gavarra	1983	L5
Sant Ildefons	1983	L5

== Commuter railway stations ==
Name	Opened	Operator	Lines
Almeda	1985	FGC	S33, S4, S5, R5, R6
Cornellà de Llobregat railway station	1854	Renfe	R1, R4
Cornellà-Riera	1985	FGC	S33, S4, S5, R5, R6
Cornellà Salines	Planned	FGC	S33, S4, S5, R5, R6
Sant Josep	1985	FGC	S33, S4, S5, R5, R6

== Tram stations ==
A tram arriving at the El Pedró stop of Trambaix, in Cornellà

All served by Trambaix.

Name	Opened	Lines
Cornellà Centre	2004	T1, T2
El Pedró	2004	T1, T2
Fontsanta-Fatjó	2004	T1, T2
Ignasi Iglésias	2004	T1, T2
Les Aigües	2004	T1, T2

== Bus lines ==
=== Day services ===
- 67 Barcelona (Plaça Catalunya) – Cornellà (Av. Fama) (via Sant Ildefons i Avinguda Diagonal)
- 68 Barcelona (Plaça Catalunya) – Cornellà (Av. Fama) (via Pedralbes i Via Augusta)
- 94 Almeda-Riera-Fontsanta-Centre-El Pedró-Sant Ildefons-Gavarra-Almeda(Bus urbà de Cornellà)
- 95 Almeda-Gavarra-Sant Ildefons-El Pedró-Centre-Fonstsanta-Riera-Almeda(Bus urbà de Cornellà)
- L10 El Prat (Sant Cosme) – Sant Feliu (Consell Comarcal)
- L12: Barcelona (Plaça Reina Maria Cristina) - Cornella (Almeda)
- L46 Cornellà (Ambulatori) – Sant Just (Plaça Parador) (Bus urbà de Sant Joan Despí)
- L52 L'Hospitalet (Ciutat de la Justícia / Santa Eulàlia) – Sant Feliu (Plaça Pere Dot)
- L74 Cornellà (Sant Ildefons) – Sant Boi (Plaça Assemblea de Catalunya)
- L75 Cornellà (Centre) – Sant Boi (Plaça Assemblea de Catalunya)
- L77 Sant Joan Despí (Hospital Moisès Broggi) – Gavà Mar (per l'aeroport)
- L82 L'Hospitalet (Ciutat de la Justícia / Santa Eulàlia) – Gavà (Avinguda l'Eramprunyà) (Per Almeda)
- L85 L'Hospitalet (Ciutat de la Justícia / Santa Eulàlia) – Gavà (Avinguda l'Eramprunyà) (Per Sant Ildefons)

=== Night buses ===
- N13 Barcelona (Plaça Catalunya) – Sant Boi (Ciutat Cooperativa)
- N14 Barcelona (Plaça Catalunya) – Castelldefels (Centre)
- N15 Barcelona (Plaça Portal de la Pau - Plaça Catalunya) – Sant Joan Despí (Torreblanca)

== See also ==
- Transport in Barcelona
- Transport in Badalona
- Transport in Castelldefels
- Transport in L'Hospitalet de Llobregat
- Transport in Santa Coloma de Gramenet
- Transport in Sant Adrià de Besòs
- Transport in Montcada i Reixac
