= Buses in Barcelona =

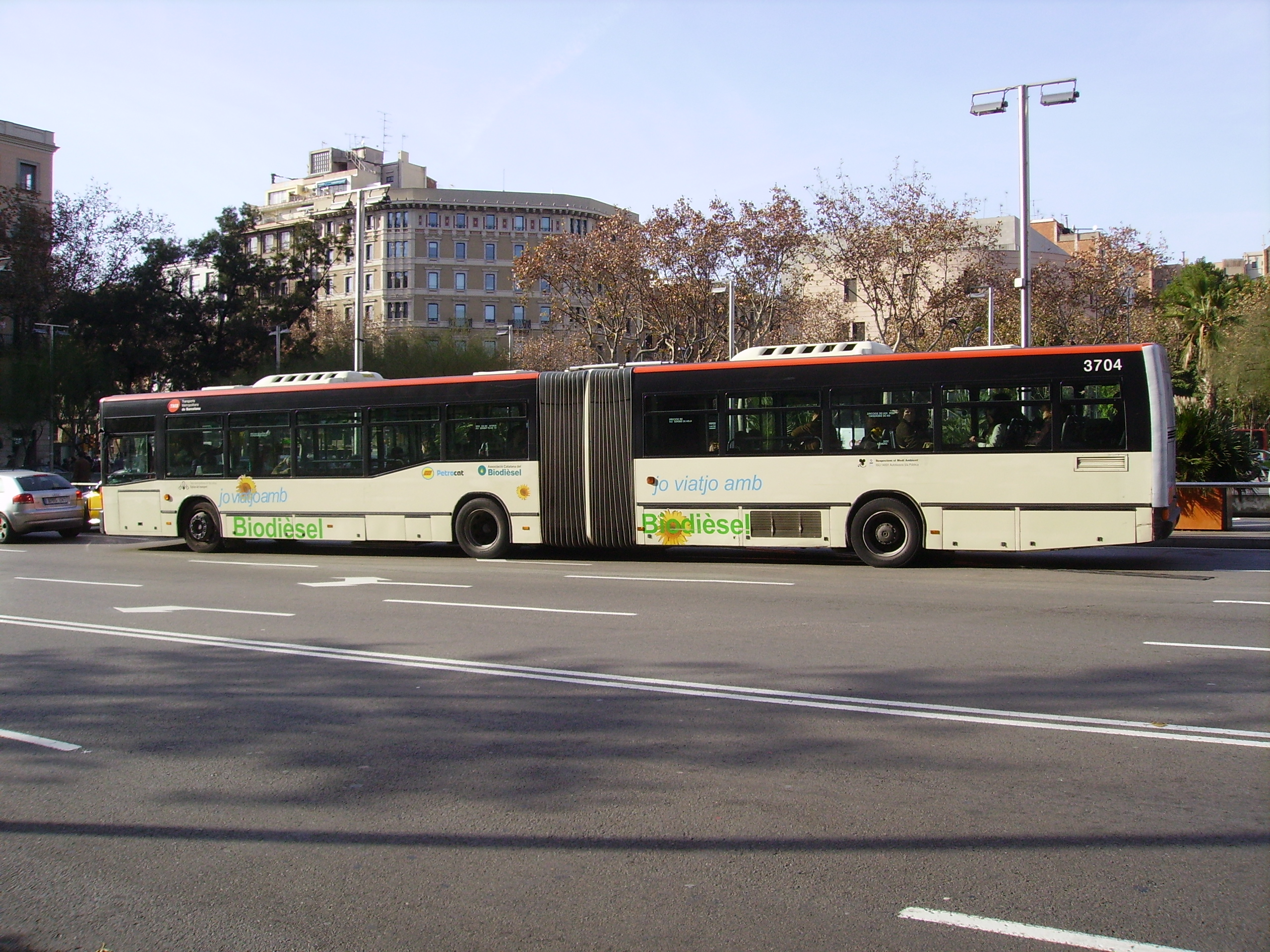
A Mercedes-Benz articulated TMB bus run by biodiesel on Plaça de la Universitat.

Buses are a widely used form of public transport in Barcelona, with an extensive local and interurban bus network. There is also a network of night buses called Nitbus (es) and a transitway system called RetBus under development. All bus routes serving Barcelona metropolitan area are organized by Autoritat del Transport Metropolità (ATM). These buses are operated mostly operated by Transports Metropolitans de Barcelona (TMB), although the city is also served by several private companies.

In 2011, the network had a length of 2,242.9 km on which 215 lines operated by 11 different operators, which carried 263.3 million passengers, 0.3% more than in 2010.

== History ==
=== Local buses ===
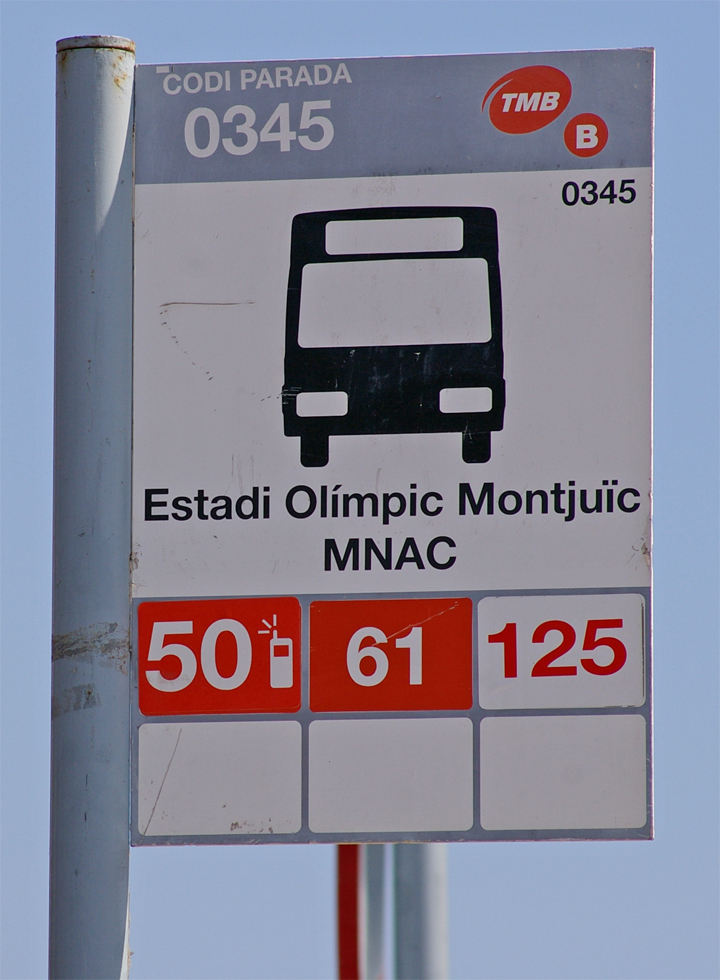
A typical TMB bus stop near Estadi Olímpic Lluís Companys.

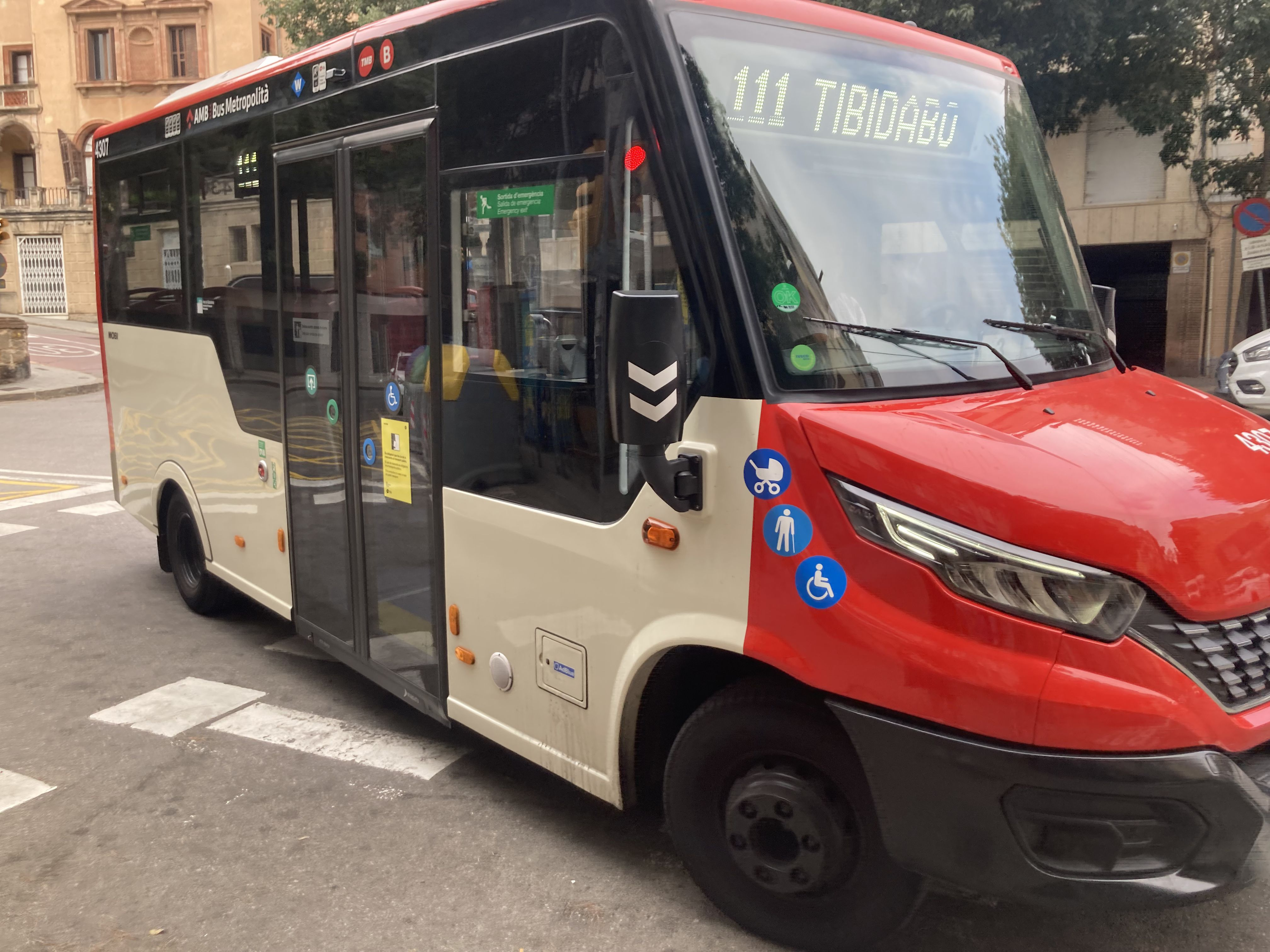
TMB bus route 111 going to Tibidabo.

The local bus network reaches all neighbourhoods in Barcelona including some municipalities attached to the city and the airport. Local buses are operated for the most part by Transports Metropolitans de Barcelona (TMB) although some lines are operated by private sector companies under contract to TMB. There are over 100 urban lines serving the city and most of them pass through two or more districts, covering relatively long distances within Barcelona. Because of this, some lines called Bus del Barri (meaning The Neighbourhood's Bus in Catalan) were created. These lines operate small buses and cover short-haul routes enabling access to shopping areas health care services, schools and other facilities.

In 2011, TMB announced plans for an improved bus network, initially dubbed "RetBus". This was introduced in 6 phases between 2012 and 2018 which established 28 high performance lines: 17 vertical (sea-mountain), 8 horizontal (Llobregat-Besòs) and 3 diagonal.

=== Interurban buses ===
The interurban bus service links Barcelona with the other towns in the metropolitan area. See the timetables of the various buses by searching the AMB (Àrea Metropolitana de Barcelona) website.

=== Nitbus ===
During the night, the company NitBus provides a night-time bus service in Barcelona and the first metropolitan ring with 21 lines. 19 of them go through Plaça de Catalunya, where you can change to other lines. The frequency is 15/20 minutes between 22:20 and 06:00.

=== Airport bus ===
Aerobús is the shuttle bus service that connects Barcelona Airport (Terminals 1 and 2) and downtown Barcelona. It is operated by the Metropolitan Area of Barcelona (AMB).

The service operates 24 hours a day, every day of the year. It has two bus lines: the A1, which goes to Terminal 1 every 5-10 minutes, and the A2, which goes to Terminal 2 every 10-20 minutes. The travel time is 35 minutes, and it has stops at points in the city such as Plaça de Catalunya, Plaça d'Espanya, Plaça de la Universitat, and Gran Via de les Corts Catalanes.

== See also ==
- Transport in Barcelona
- Autoritat del Transport Metropolità
- Transports Metropolitans de Barcelona
- Urban planning of Barcelona
- Sustainable public bus transport in Barcelona
