= Platja de Castelldefels railway station =

Railway station in Spain

Platja de Castelldefels
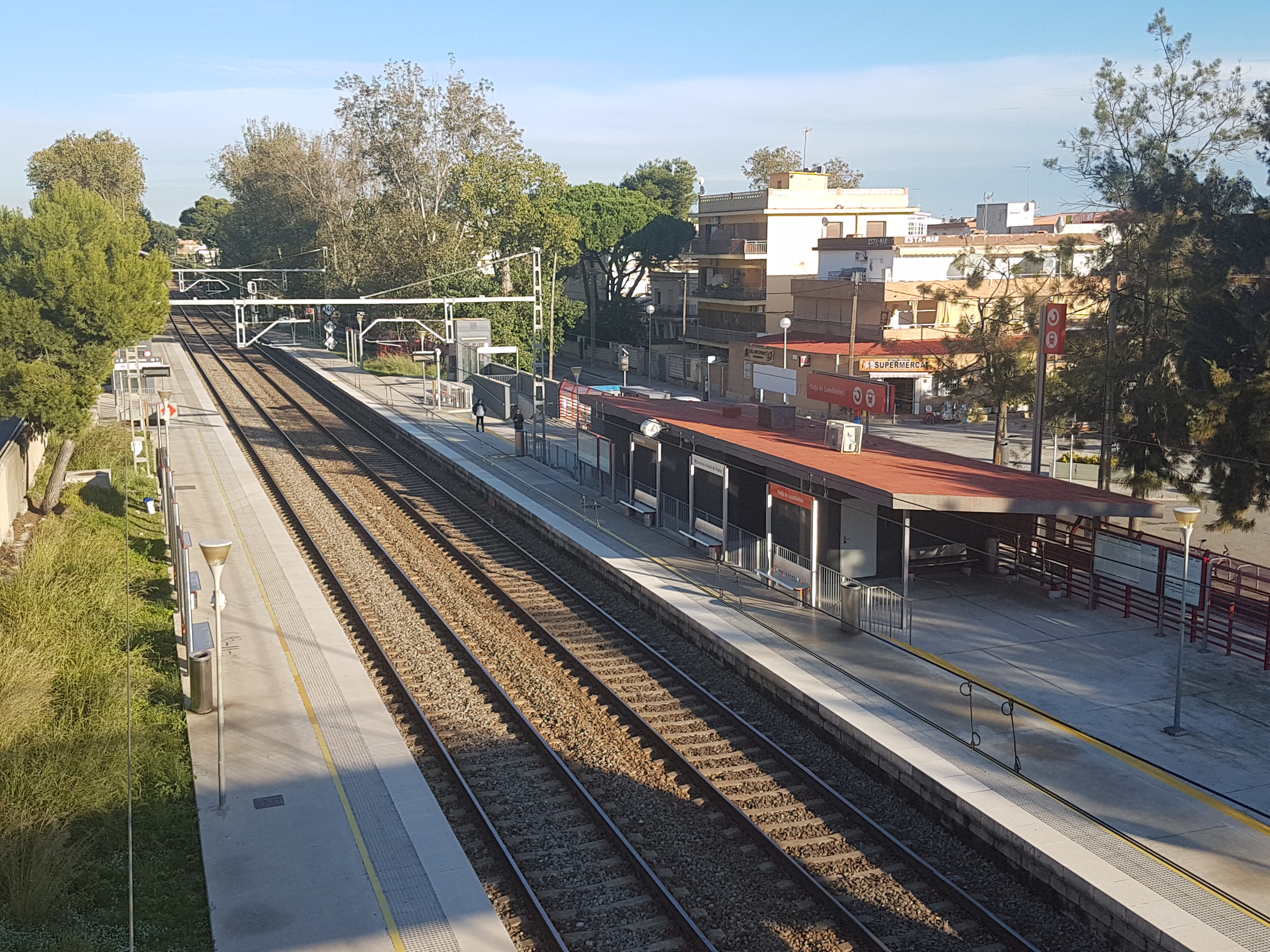

General information
- Location: Passeig del Ferrocarril; 08860 Castelldefels; Spain
- Coordinates: 41°16′1.02″N 1°57′25.61″E
- System: Rodalies de Catalunya commuter rail station
- Owner: Adif
- Operator: Renfe Operadora
- Line: Madrid–Barcelona (PK 656.6)
- Platforms: 2 side platforms
- Tracks: 2
- Connections: Local and night buses

Construction
- Structure type: At-grade

Other information
- Station code: 71704
- Fare zone: 1 (ATM Àrea de Barcelona); 2 (Rodalies de Catalunya's Barcelona commuter rail service)

Services
Preceding station	Rodalies de Catalunya	Following station
Garraf towards Sant Vicenç de Calders	R2 Sud	Castelldefels towards Barcelona Estació de França
Location

Platja de Castelldefels is a Rodalies de Catalunya railway station serving the beach district of Castelldefels, in Catalonia, Spain. It is located at about 2 kilometres (1.2 mi) south of the main town and less than 200 metres (660 ft) from the beach, making it very busy during the summer months but almost deserted in winter. It is served by some trains on Barcelona commuter rail service line R2 Sud.

== Overview ==
The station has two 200-metre-long (660 ft) platforms connected by a footbridge and, since November 2009, an underpass. Trains arriving from Barcelona stop at platform 1, on the opposite side of the railway tracks from the beach. There have been several accidents caused by passengers directly crossing the tracks rather than using the footbridge. A 19-year-old woman was killed by an on-coming train while crossing the tracks on 4 March 2009. On the evening of 23 June 2010, the station was the site of the Castelldefels train accident in which 13 people were killed and 14 people were injured when an Alaris intercity train from Alicante to Barcelona ploughed into a large group of people who were crossing the lines.

The only trains that stop at the station are those of the Barcelona commuter rail service. Regional services from Barcelona to Tarragona and Tortosa, as well as long-distance services to Valencia and Alicante, also pass through the station. These non-stopping trains can pass through the station at speeds of up to 150 km/h (93 mph).

The safety of the station, particularly the problems of allowing large numbers of passengers to leave the station, was criticized after its refurbishment in 2009 by members of Castelldefels town council. In November 2009, one council member, Àngels Coté said "on St. John's Eve [the night of 23 June, a major celebration in Catalonia] it could become a rat trap [una ratera], and the months of July and August as well."

The town council also had official discussions on the subject with Adif, the owner of the station. However, it is clear that the passengers crossing the tracks could have used a bridge that is situated at one end of the platform, even if this would have involved a short additional walk.
