= Transport in Badalona =

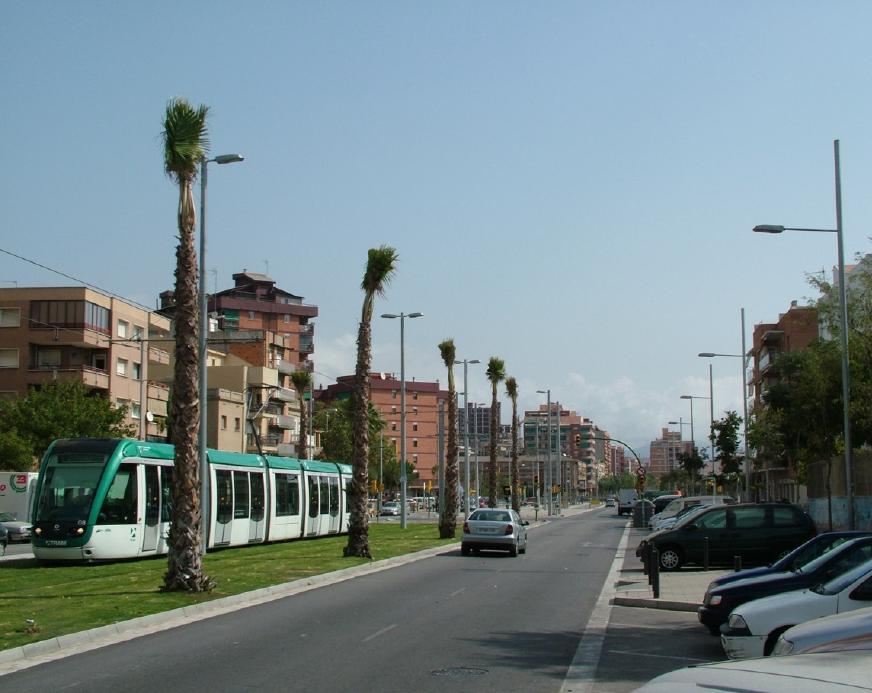
A Trambesòs train at Avinguda del Marquès de Mont-roig.

Public transport in Badalona (Catalonia, Spain) consists of a variety of services operated by several companies, most of them associated with Autoritat del Transport Metropolità, the main transport authority of the Metropolitan Area of Barcelona. At just over 220,000 inhabitants, Badalona is one of Catalonia's most populated towns, and is located immediately next to the capital Barcelona, along the Mediterranean Sea coastline. It is both a dormitory town and a developed city in itself, which makes the proper articulation of transport of vital importance.

== Barcelona Metro stations ==
The branch of L2 serving Badalona was first part of L4. Handover took place in the 1990s, when the construction of L2 took place. The long-announced L10 is currently under construction, but the stations located within the municipality of Badalona, along with some in Barcelona, are already operative as of 2010. An extension of L1 from Fondo, in Santa Coloma de Gramenet, is currently planned.

Name	Opened	Lines
Artigues-Sant Adrià	1985	L2
Badalona Est	Planned	L1
Badalona Pompeu Fabra	2010	L2, L1
Bufalà	Planned	L1
Gorg	1985	L2, L10
La Salut	2010	L10
Llefià	2010	L10
Montigalà-Lloreda	Planned	L1
Pep Ventura	1985	L2
Sant Crist	Planned	L1
Sant Roc	1985	L2

== Rodalies commuter railway station ==
Name	Opened	Lines
Badalona railway station	1848	R1

== Tram stations ==
All served by Trambesòs since 2007.

Name	Opened	Lines
Gorg	2007	T5, T6
Port de Badalona	Planned	T4
Sant Roc	2007	T5, T6

== Bus lines ==
=== Operated by TMB ===
- H10: Plaça de Sants (Barcelona) - Olímpic Badalona (Badalona)

=== Operated by TUSGSAL ===
- B1: Av. Martí Pujol (Badalona) - Metro Fondo (Santa Coloma)
- B2: Manresà (Badalona) - "Hospital Esperit Sant" (Santa Coloma)
- B3: Les Guixeres (Badalona) - Llefià (Badalona)
- B4: Mas-Ram (Badalona) - Montigalà (Badalona)
- B5: "Estació Rodalies" (Badalona) - "Hospital Esperit Sant" (Santa Coloma)
- B6: "Estació Rodalies" (Badalona)- "Hospital Can Ruti" (Badalona)
- B7: "Estació Rodalies" (Sant Adrià) - Bonavista/Bufalà (Badalona)
- B8: Bonavista-Bufalà-Bonavista (Badalona) (línia circular)
- B12: Pl. Lluís Companys (Montcada) - "Can Ruti Tanatori" (Badalona)
- B14: "Estació Rodalies" (Sant Adrià) - Can Franquesa (Santa Coloma)
- B15: Les Oliveres (Santa Coloma) - Montigalà (Badalona)
- B19: "Hospital Can Ruti" (Badalona) - "Vall d'Hebron (Barcelona)
- B20: Les Oliveres (Santa Coloma - Ronda de Sant Pere (Barcelona)
- B23: Montigalà (Badalona) - Diagonal Mar(Barcelona)
- B24: "Hospital Can Ruti" (Badalona) - Ronda de Sant Pere (Barcelona)
- B25: Pomar (Badalona) - Ronda de Sant Pere (Barcelona)
- B26 "Hospital Can Ruti" (Badalona) - "Estació Rodalies" (Sant Adrià)
- B27: Les Oliveres (Santa Coloma - "Francesc Layret" (Badalona)
- B28 "Hospital Can Ruti" (Badalona) - "Sant Andreu" (Barcelona)
- B29: Montigalà (Badalona) - "Poliesportiu Tiana" Tiana
- B30: Can Franquesa (Santa Coloma) - La Virreina (Tiana)
- B80: Can Franquesa - Santa Eulàlia (Santa Coloma)
- B81: La Bastida - "Hospital de l'Esperit Sant" (Santa Coloma)

=== "NitBus" (night bus) ===
- N2: Av.Carrilet (L'Hospitalet) - Via Augusta (Badalona)
- N9: Portal de la Pau (Barcelona) - Edith Llaurador (Tiana)
- N11: Pl.Catalunya (Barcelona) - Hospital Can Ruti (Badalona)

== Port of Badalona ==
- Port of Badalona
- Club de Vela Badalona

== Transport in the municipalities of Badalonès ==
- Transport in Barcelona
- Transport in L'Hospitalet de Llobregat
- Transport in Montcada i Reixac
- Transport in Sant Adrià de Besòs
- Transport in Santa Coloma de Gramenet

== Transport in other Metropolitan Area municipalities ==
- Transport in Cornellà de Llobregat

== See also ==
- Autoritat del Transport Metropolità
