= Incremental sheet forming =

Incremental sheet forming (or ISF, also known as Single Point Forming) is a sheet metal forming technique where a sheet is formed into the final workpiece by a series of small incremental deformations. However, studies have shown that it can be applied to polymer and composite sheets too. Generally, the sheet is formed by a round tipped tool, typically 5 to 20mm in diameter. The tool, which can be attached to a CNC machine, a robot arm or similar, indents into the sheet by about 1 mm and follows a contour for the desired part. It then indents further and draws the next contour for the part into the sheet and continues to do this until the full part is formed. ISF can be divided into variants depending on the number of contact points between tool, sheet and die (in case there is any). The term Single Point Incremental Forming (SPIF) is used when the opposite side of the sheet is supported by a faceplate and Two Point Incremental Forming (TPIF) when a full or partial die supports the sheet.

== Types ==
Single-point incremental forming (SPIF) and double-sided incremental forming (DSIF) are the two variants of the IF process. In the DSIF process, two tools are used to form the sheet on either side, while the SPIF process only uses a tool on one side of the sheet. Thus, a component having features on either side of the sheet, e.g., an inverted cone can be effectively formed by the DSIF process.

== Advantages over conventional sheet metal forming ==
Because the process can be controlled entirely by CNC processes no die is required as is in traditional sheet metal forming. The elimination of the die in the manufacturing process reduces the cost per piece and decreases turnaround time for low production runs because the need to manufacture a die is eliminated. However, for high production runs the time and cost to produce a die is absorbed by the higher per piece speed and lower per piece cost. Several authors recognize that the formability of metal materials under the localized deformation imposed by incremental forming is better than in conventional deep drawing. In contrast, there is a loss of accuracy with the ISF process.

== Implementation ==
The ISF process is generally implemented by clamping a sheet in the XY plane, which is free to move along the Z axis. The tool moves in the XY plane and is coordinated with movements in the Z axis to create the desired part. It is often convenient to retrofit a CNC milling machine to accommodate the process. Spherical, flat-bottomed, and parabolic tool profiles can be used to achieve differing surface finishes and forming limits.

The machine employs a combination of stretch forming by drawing the sheet incrementally down over a die, with the CNC tool approach described above. This is said to produce a more even distribution of thickness of the material. The process is well suited to one-off manufacture though difficulties in simulating the process mean that toolpaths are complex and time-consuming to determine.

Ford Motor Company has recently released Ford Freeform Fabrication Technology, a two-point incremental sheet-forming technique being implemented in the rapid prototyping of automotive parts. Complex shapes such as the human face and cranial implants have been manufactured successfully using this manufacturing process. Advances in the technology are expected to increase adoption in the near future by other sheet metal-reliant manufacturers.

== Applications ==
Incremental forming (IF) is a recent manufacturing process having a wide range of applications in the following areas.

- Biomedical Implant
- Automobile
- Aerospace
- Nuclear Reactors
- Defense

== List of process parameters ==
The mechanics of the process is influenced by many parameters, including:

- the transverse X-Y feed rate,
- the vertical Z feed rate or pitch,
- the (optional) tool rotation,
- the coefficient of friction,
- the tool shape (radius),
- the sheet temperature,

== Current research ==
Research is underway at several universities. The most common implementation is to outfit a traditional milling machine with the spherical tool used in the ISF process. Key research areas include

- Developing rolling tools to decrease friction.
- Reduce thinning of sheets after forming
- Increase accuracy by eliminating springback
- Develop novel uses, especially extending the process to new materials (e.g. composites) and to apply heating
- Improve surface roughness
