= Vallès =

Coordinates: 41°33′52.56″N 2°15′27.68″E

Location of Vallès within the autonomous community of Catalonia (limits 1936-2015).

El Vallès (Catalan pronunciation: [əl βəˈʎɛs], or simply Vallès) is a historical county in Catalonia, Spain, located in the center of the Catalan Pre-Coastal Range. It is nowadays represented by two separate administrative divisions (comarques) which are part of the Barcelona Province: the Western Vallès, which has two capitals, Sabadell and Terrassa; and the Eastern Vallès, with Granollers as its capital.

The present division of Vallès has its historical roots in the legal districts of Granollers and Terrassa, established in 1834. However, the first time this subdivision was explicitly used as sanctioned by law was in 1936, with the official division of Catalonia in comarques. In 2015, four of the municipalities in Eastern Vallès became part of a newly created comarca: the Moianès. Some parts of the Vallès region belong to the metropolitan area of Barcelona and the Àmbit Metropolità de Barcelona(metropolitan region of Barcelona), and is nowadays connected with Barcelona with public transportations systems such as FGC's so-called Metro del Vallès.

== See also ==
- Vallès Occidental
- Vallès Oriental
- Àmbit Metropolità de Barcelona
- ASCAMM, a technology centre at the Vallès Technology Park
