= Sabadell Airport =

Sabadell Airport Aeroport de Sabadell
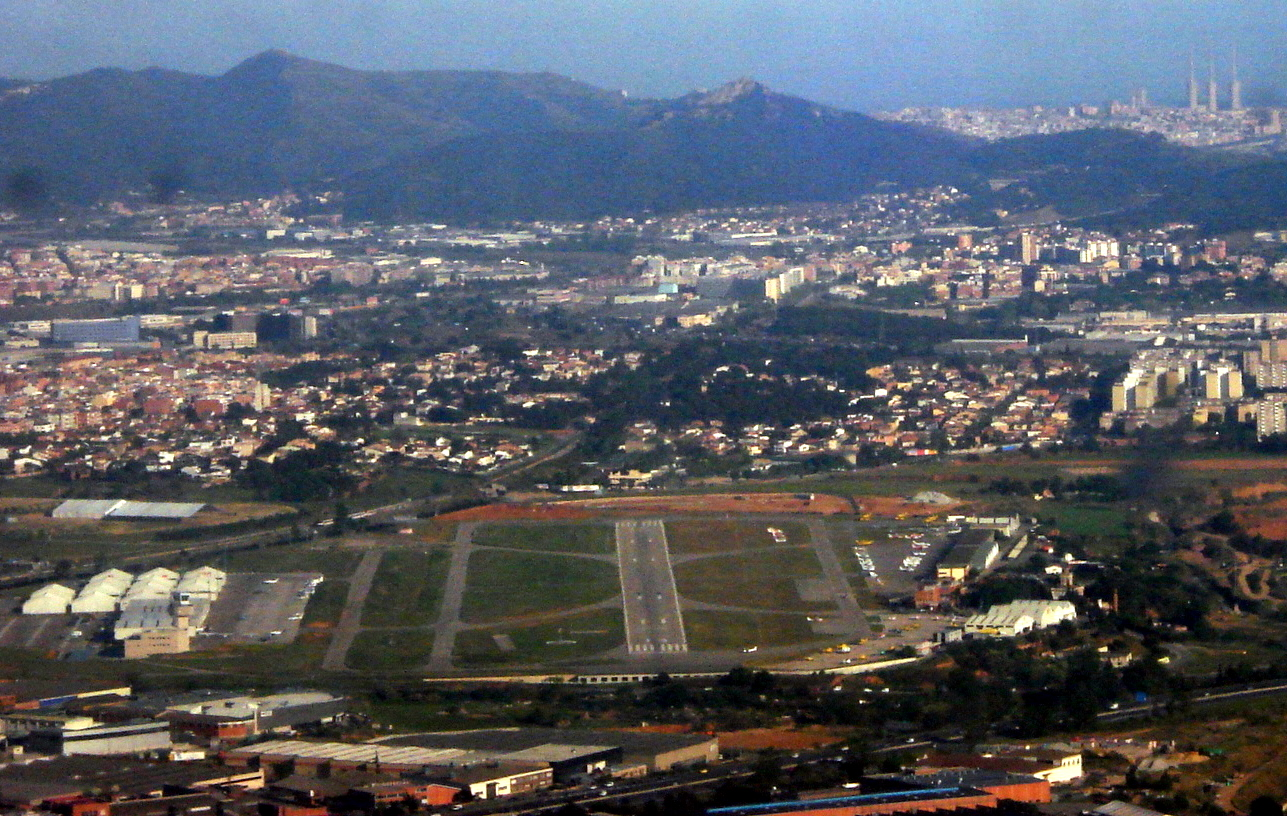
- IATA: QYS; ICAO: LELL

Summary
- Airport type: Public
- Operator: AENA
- Location: Sabadell, Spain
- Elevation AMSL: 485 ft / 148 m
- Coordinates: 41°31′N 2°6′E

Map
- Location within Spain

Runways
Direction	Length		Surface
Direction	m	ft	Surface
13/31	1,050	3,444	Asphalt

Statistics (2016)
- Movements: 36,002
- Movements change 2015–16: ▲20.1%
- Sources: Aena

Sabadell Airport (IATA: QSA, ICAO: LELL) is located next to the city of Sabadell, 20 kilometres (12 mi) from Barcelona's city centre, in Catalonia. This, and the Madrid–Cuatro Vientos Airport, are the most important airports for general aviation in Spain. There are more than 200 aircraft registered at this airport, completing around 150,000 operations per year. There are more than 400 people working at these facilities, including training schools, workshops, etc. This airport hosts the oldest aviation club in Spain.

70% of the activity of this airport is devoted to pilot training (both fixed wing and rotary). The other 30% is for advertising flights, photography, and aerotaxi, private flights and institutional flights.
