= Àmbit metropolità de Barcelona =

Vegueria (region) of Catalonia

Coordinates: 41.498°N 2.123°E

Àmbit metropolità de Barcelona Vegueria of Barcelona
- Vegueria
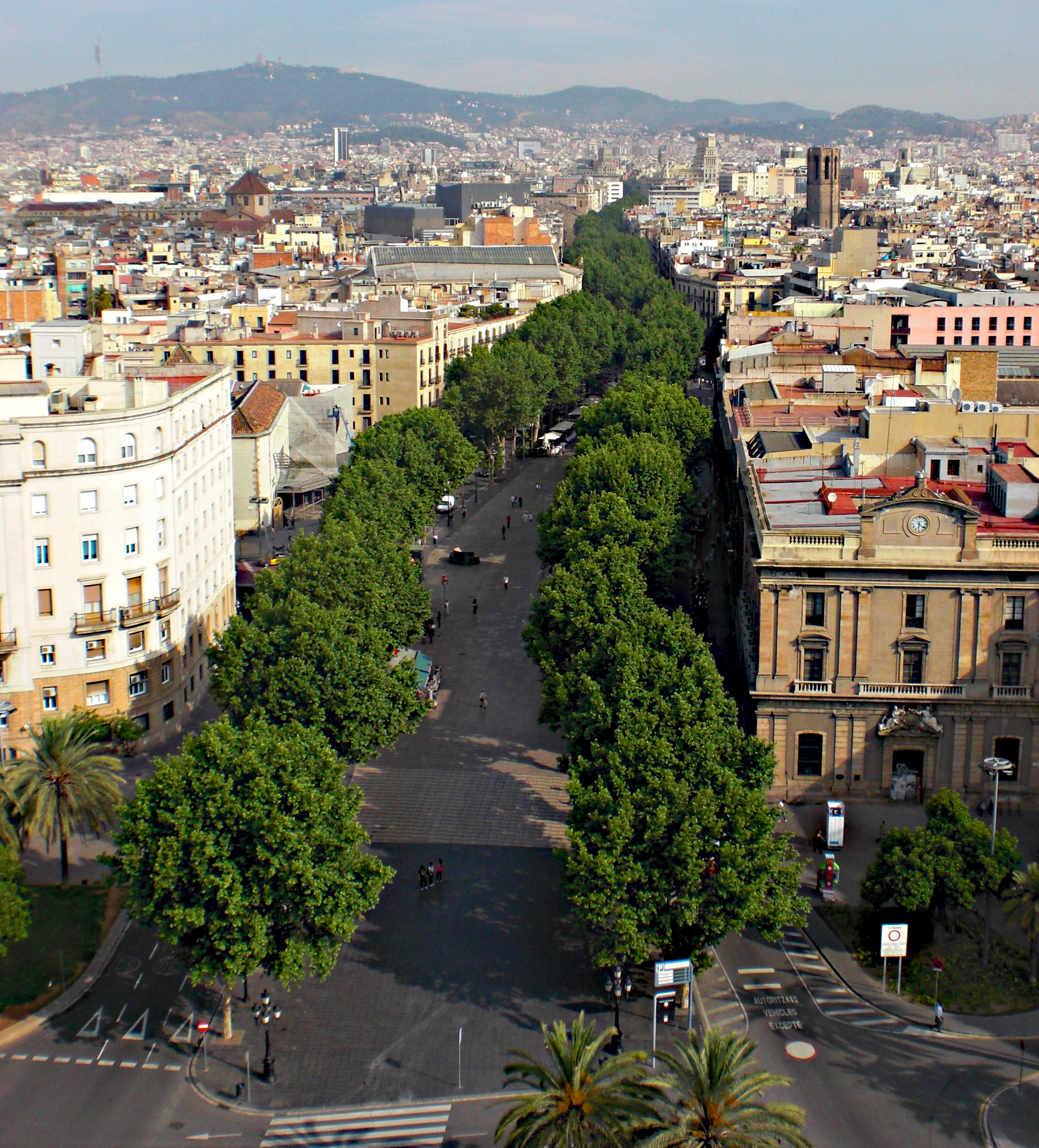
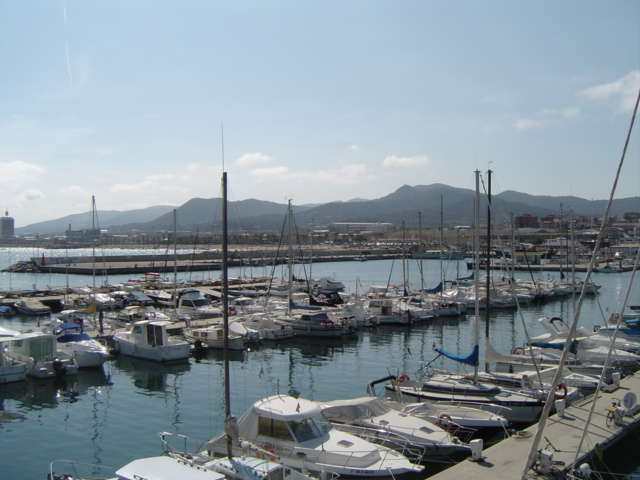
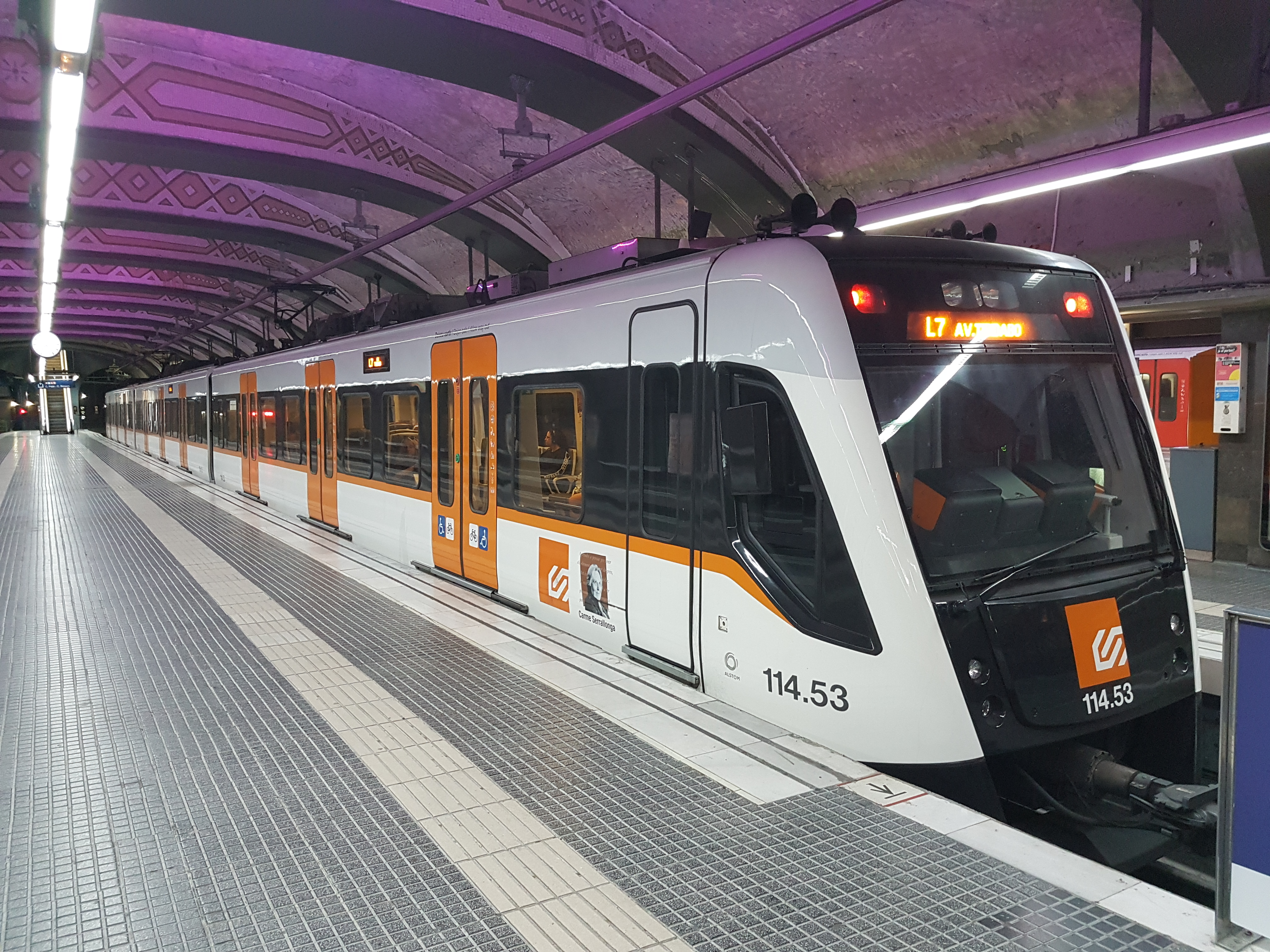
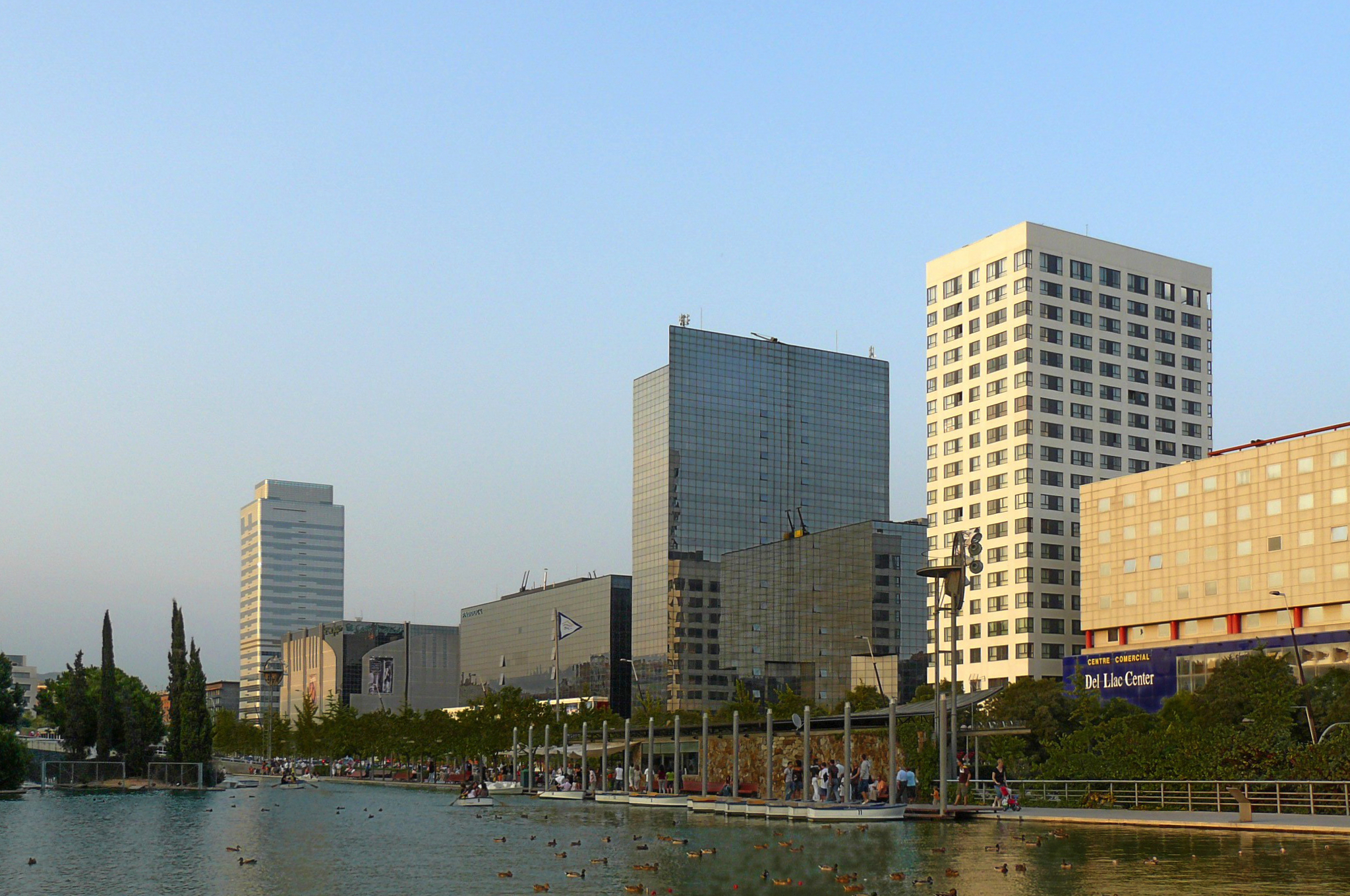
- From top, left to right: La Rambla boulevard in Barcelona; Mataró port; Plaça de Catalunya station in Barcelona; Sabadell

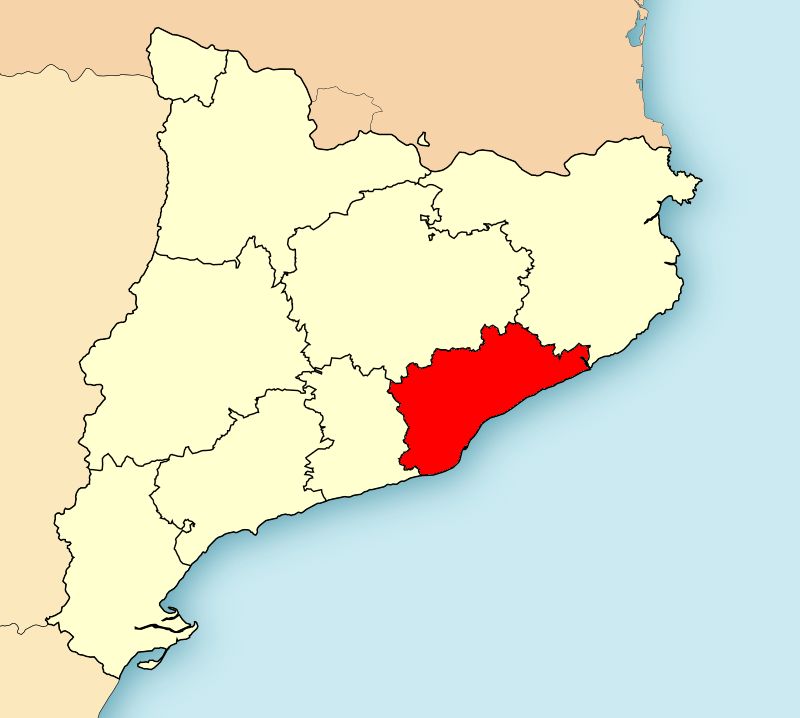
- Sovereign state: Spain
- Community: Catalonia
- Capital: Barcelona
- Counties: Barcelonès; Baix Llobregat; Maresme; Vallès Occidental; Vallès Oriental

Area
  - Total: 2,464.4 km^{2} (951.5 sq mi)

Population (2025)
  - Total: 5,138,392
  - Density: 2,085.0/km^{2} (5,400.2/sq mi)

Àmbit metropolità de Barcelona (Catalan pronunciation: [ˈambid mətɾupuliˈta ðə βəɾsəˈlonə]; Barcelona Metropolitan Demarcation), also referred to as the vegueria of Barcelona, is one of the nine regions (vegueries) of Catalonia.

Located in the centre of the Catalan Pre-Coastal Range, it is the most populated region, with 5,138,392 inhabitants as of 2025.

The region includes the counties of Baix Llobregat, Barcelonès, Maresme, Vallès Occidental and Vallès Oriental. Within Catalonia it borders Penedès to the south, Central Catalonia to the west, and vegueria of Girona to the north.

Its capital city is Barcelona.

== Characteristics ==
The region was defined in 1987 in the Territorial Planning Laws approved by the Parliament of Catalonia. It currently comprises Barcelona and its area of economic and market influence. Alt Penedès and Garraf were initially part of it as well, but were integrated into the new Penedès region in 2017.

In April 2008, the Department of Territorial Policy and Public Works of the Generalitat de Catalunya presented the preliminary draft of the Barcelona Metropolitan Territorial Plan, which delimits the areas of scenic and strategic interest that are to be preserved and aims to promote a quality road and rail network.

== Demography ==
The region's most populated cities (100,000+ inhabitants) are Barcelona, L'Hospitalet de Llobregat, Badalona, Terrassa, Sabadell, Mataró and Santa Coloma de Gramenet.

=== Population by county ===
Àmbit metropolità de Barcelona is composed of five different comarques.

Comarca	Capital	Population (2025)	Area (km^{2})	Map
Baix Llobregat	Sant Feliu de Llobregat	856,867	486	
Barcelonès	Barcelona	2,398,280	146	
Maresme	Mataró	477,375	399	
Vallès Occidental	Terrassa and Sabadell	970,228	583	
Vallès Oriental	Granollers	431,351	735	

== Transport ==
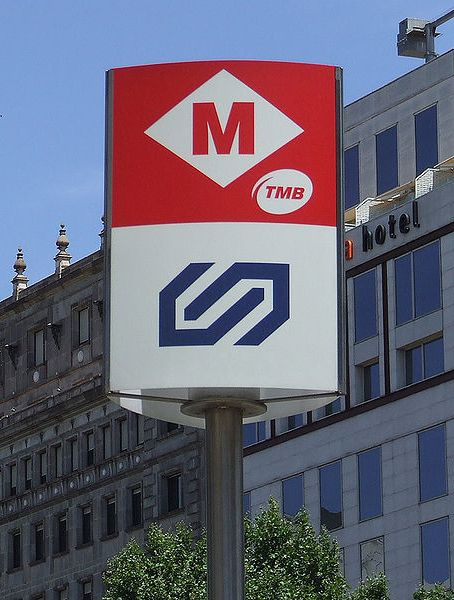
Underground and rail service in Plaça de Catalunya

Since 1997, the region's transport is coordinated by the Metropolitan Transport Authority, with the aims of planning the infrastructure and services, managing relations with transport operators, handling the financing of the transport system and setting fares.

== Local media ==
=== Television ===
In June 1980, the town of Cardedeu, in Vallès Oriental county, began broadcasts of Televisió de Cardedeu, a community television channel that would be the first channel to broadcast entirely in Catalan, as well as the first local channel in Catalonia and in the whole of Spain.

Nowadays, the region holds TVC's studios, in Sant Joan Despí (Baix Llobregat), as well as RTVE's Catalan studios, located in Sant Cugat del Vallès (Vallès Occidental).

As far as programming exclusive to the region is concerned, six different local multiplexes are active. In contrast to other regions of Catalonia, there are no local channels broadcast for the whole Barcelona region, but rather for each of its counties. Below are the main television channels broadcasting in each county as of April 2024.

County	Channel name	Type	Headquarters	Multiplex
Barcelonès	betevé	Public (Barcelona)	Sant Martí, Barcelona (Barcelonès)	TL01B
Barcelonès	Televisió de Badalona	Public (Badalona)	Badalona (Barcelonès)	TL01B
Barcelonès	Televisió de l'Hospitalet	Public (L'Hospitalet de Llobregat)	L'Hospitalet de Llobregat (Barcelonès)	TL01B
Vallès Oriental	Vallès Oriental Televisió	Public (Vallès Oriental)	Granollers (Vallès Oriental)	TL02B
Vallès Oriental	Vallès Visió	Public (Vallès Oriental)	Mollet del Vallès (Vallès Oriental)	TL02B
Vallès Oriental	Ràdio Televisió Cardedeu	Non-profit community	Cardedeu (Vallès Oriental)	TL02B
Baix Llobregat	ETV Llobregat	Commercial	Esplugues de Llobregat (Baix Llobregat)	TL03B
Maresme	tvmataró	Public (Maresme)	Mataró (Maresme)	TL06B
Maresme	MarTV	Commercial	Premià de Mar (Maresme)	TL06B
Vallès Occidental	Mola TV	Commercial	Sabadell (Vallès Occidental)	TL07B
Vallès Occidental	Televisió Sant Cugat	Commercial	Sant Cugat del Vallès (Vallès Occidental)	TL07B
Vallès Occidental	Canal Terrassa Vallès	Public (Vallès Occidental)	Terrassa (Vallès Occidental)	TL07B
Vallès Occidental	Canal Terrassa Vallès	Public (Vallès Occidental)	Terrassa (Vallès Occidental)	TL12B

== See also ==
- Vegueries of Catalonia
- Comarques of Catalonia
- Barcelona metropolitan area
- Metropolitan Transport Authority
- Urban planning of Barcelona
