= Genesio =

Genesio and Genésio are, respectively, the Italian and Portuguese forms of Genesius, a male given name pertaining to several saints and historical personalities. It also occurs as a surname. Notable people with the name include:

- Antonio Genesio Maria Panizzi (1797–1879), known as Anthony Panizzi, British-Italian patriot
- Bruno Génésio (born 1966), French football manager and former player
- Genésio Goulart (1954–2021), Brazilian politician
- Leanderson da Silva Genésio (born 1997), known as Lelê, Brazilian footballer

== See also ==
- Jenesio
- San Genesio (disambiguation)
