= Collblanc station =

Metro station in Barcelona, Spain

Collblanc
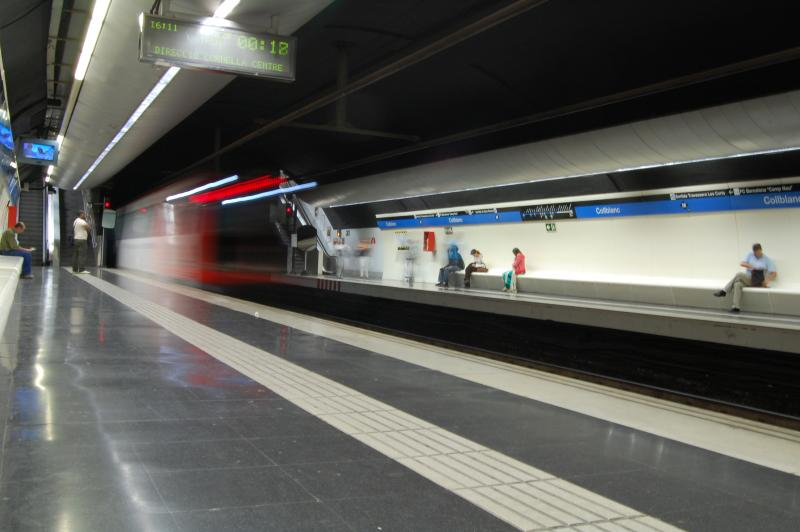
- A 5000 series train entering the Line 5 station

General information
- Location: L'Hospitalet de Llobregat (Collblanc)
- Coordinates: 41°22′32″N 2°7′14″E
- System: Barcelona Metro rapid transit station
- Owner: Transports Metropolitans de Barcelona
- Platforms: 4 side platforms
- Tracks: 4

Construction
- Structure type: Underground

Other information
- Fare zone: 1 (ATM)

History
- Opened: 1969; 57 years ago (Line 5); 2016; 10 years ago (Line 9); 2018; 8 years ago (Line 10)

Services
Preceding station	Metro	Following station
Ernest Lluch towards Cornellà Centre	L5	Badal towards Vall d'Hebron
Zona Universitària towards Airport T1	L9 Sud	Torrassa towards Zona Universitària
Torrassa towards ZAL | Riu Vell	L10 Sud	Terminus
Location
- Location within Barcelona

Collblanc (Catalan pronunciation: [ˌkɔʎˈβlaŋ]) is a Barcelona Metro station located in the neighborhood of Collblanc, in L'Hospitalet de Llobregat. Initially opened in 1969, it is currently an important interchange station between Line 5, Line 9 and Line 10. The station's accesses are located in and around the carretera de Collblanc, a major street in Hospitalet de Llobregat that borders the Barcelona neighborhood of La Maternitat i Sant Ramon.

It is one of the Barcelona Metro stations close to Camp Nou, the FC Barcelona stadium.

== Location ==
Collblanc station is located on the border between the L'Hospitalet neighborhood of the same name and the Barcelona neighborhood of La Maternitat i Sant Ramon, in the district of Les Corts.

The station's main connection hall has an access located in the Plaça de la Solidaritat, at the meeting point of the major streets of carretera de Collblanc and Travessera de les Corts.

The Line 5 station has another hall, with two accesses in the intersection of carrer de Francesc Layret and carretera de Collblanc.

== History ==
Collblanc was originally opened as a Line 5 station in 1969, serving as the terminus for an isolated section running from Diagonal. It was originally named San Ramón, after a nearby parish. It would become a through station in 1973, as the line was extended towards Pubilla Cases. The station's name changed to the current Collblanc in 1982, in the context of a general reorganization of the Barcelona Metro network. The station underwent major refurbishment works in 1999.

In 2016, a new shared station hall was opened as Collblanc became one of the initial stations on the southern portion of Line 9. The inauguration took place on February 12, 2016. As other stations on the Line 9 project, Collblanc was built in a well structure, with a depth of 56 meters. Unlike other stations however, Collblanc doesn't feature several high-capacity elevators. Instead, 5 sets of escalators link the new platforms to the station hall. Only 2 elevators reach the platform level.

As of April 2025, due to the ongoing works to complete the central section of Line 9 and Line 10, only the lower platform shared by the lines is normally in use.

On 8 September 2018, Line 10's southern branch became operational, with Collblanc serving as the line's temporary terminus.

== Passenger numbers ==
In 2024, it was the tenth most used station on the network with over 8.2 million users.

== Gallery ==
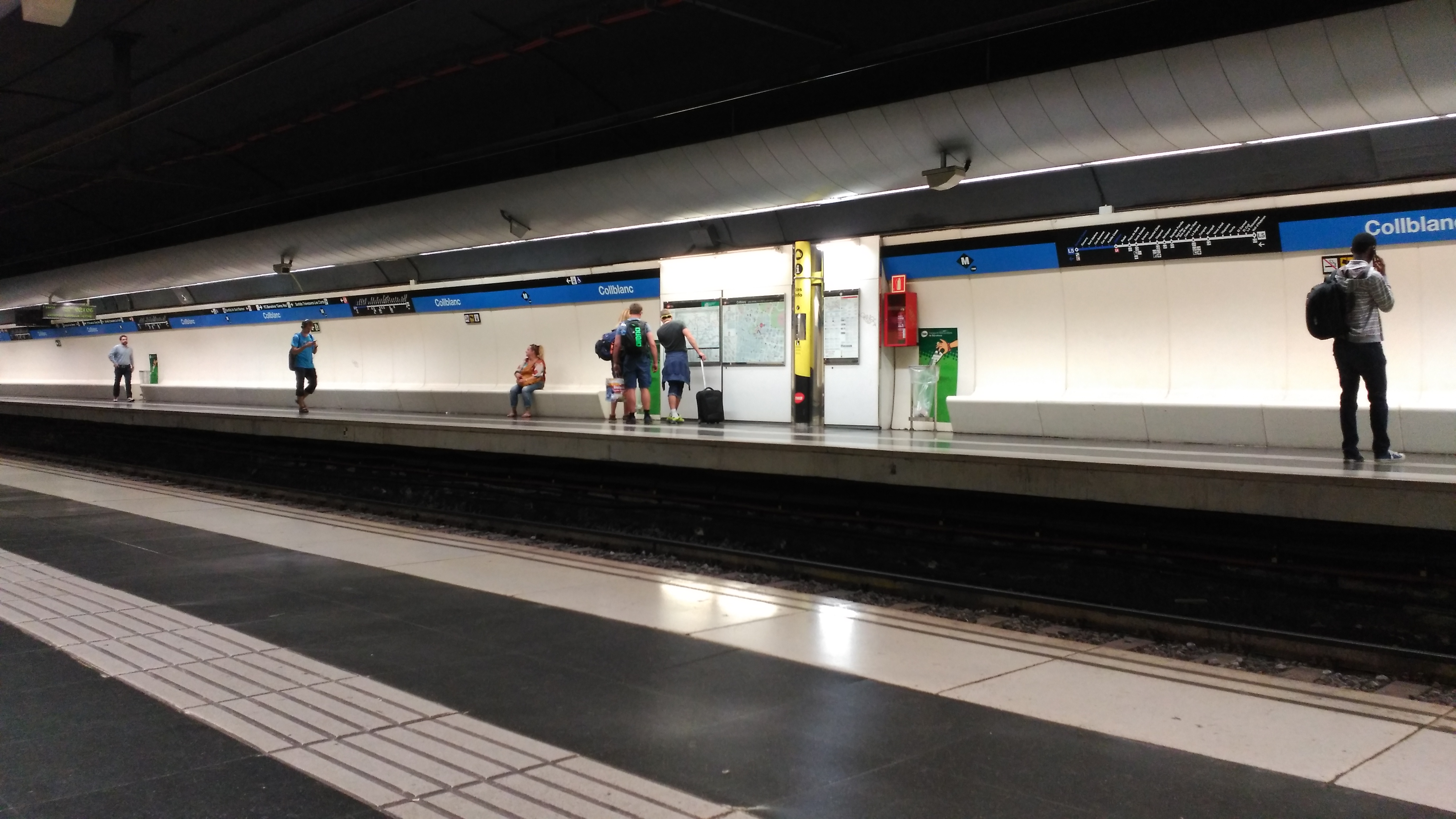
Another view of the Line 5 platforms

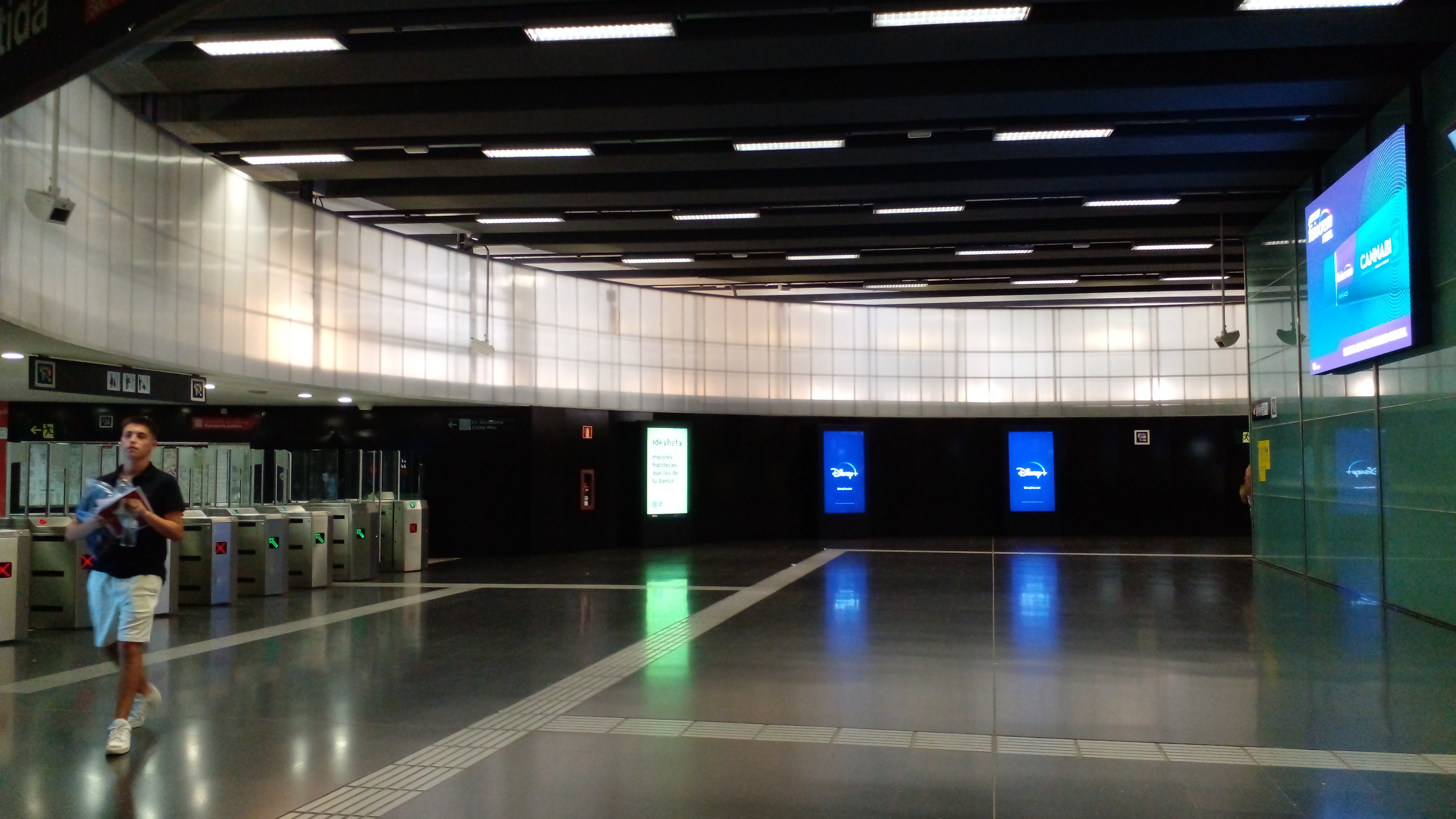
The main station hall connecting Line 5 with Line 9 and Line 10

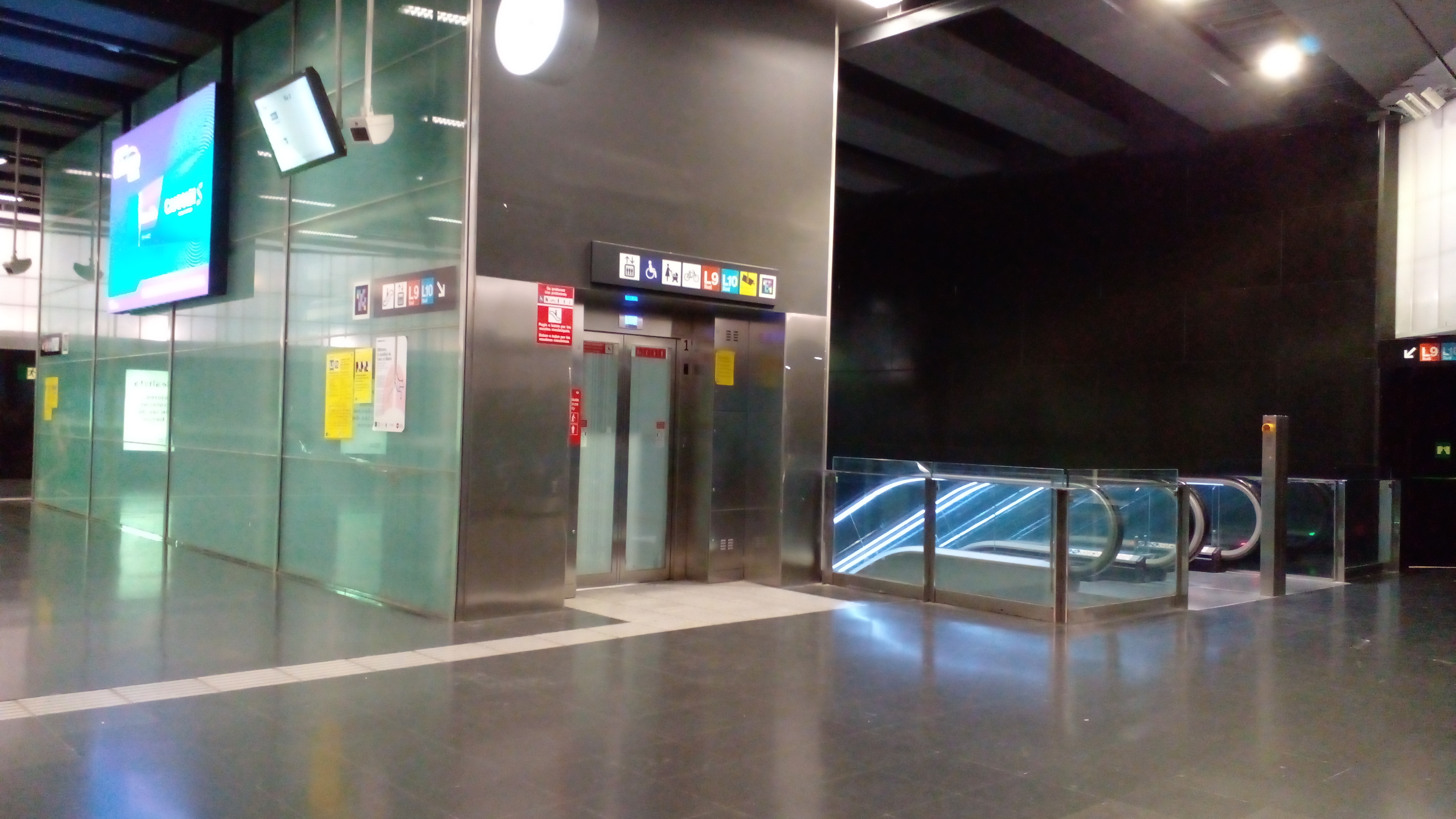
Escalators connecting the station hall to the Line 9 and Line 10 platforms

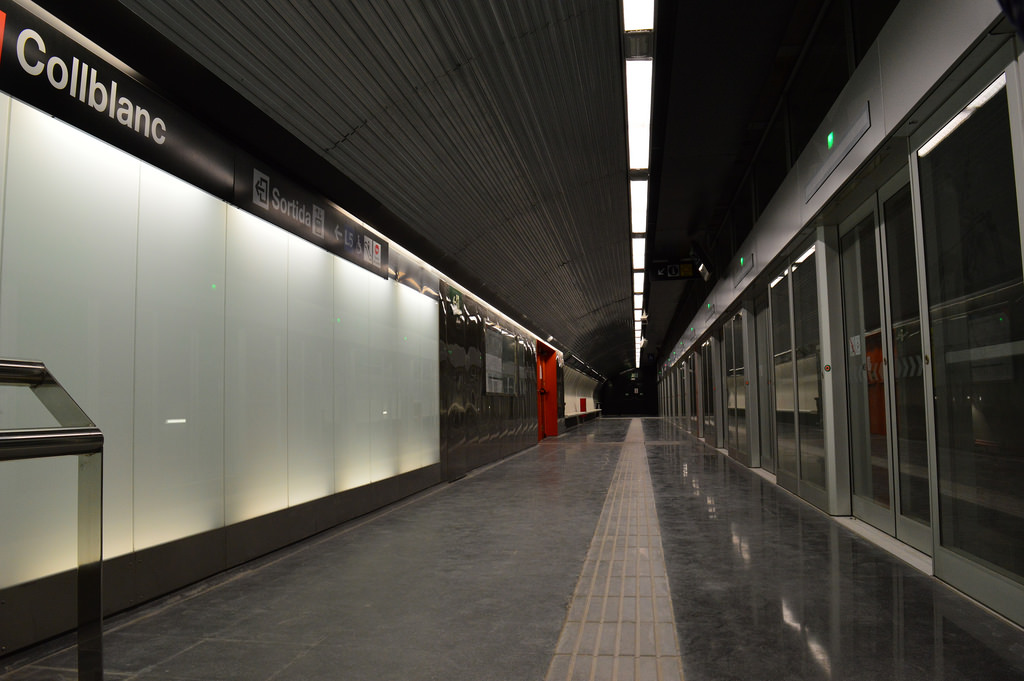
One of the platforms shared by Line 9 and Line 10

== Rail services ==
Preceding station	Metro	Following station
Ernest Lluch towards Cornellà Centre	L5	Badal towards Vall d'Hebron
Torrassa towards Airport T1	L9 Sud	Zona Universitària Terminus
Torrassa towards ZAL | Riu Vell	L10 Sud	Terminus
Projected
Torrassa towards Airport T1	L9	Camp Nou towards Can Zam
Torrassa towards Polígon Pratenc	L10	Camp Nou towards Gorg

== See also ==
- List of Barcelona Metro stations
- Transport in L'Hospitalet de Llobregat
