= Ernest Lluch station =

Metro station in Barcelona, Spain

Coordinates: 41°22′35″N 2°06′42″E

Ernest Lluch (Catalan pronunciation: [ərˈnez ˈʎuk]) is a Trambaix tram stop and a Barcelona Metro station in L'Hospitalet de Llobregat, to the south-west of Barcelona. The construction works of the new station started in 2007, though they were suspended in 2011 by the Catalan government due to the 2008–15 financial crisis in the country, construction was reactivated in 2019 and inaugurated on July 25, 2021. The metro station is located between the Pubilla Cases and Collblanc stations, and serves as an interchange station to the Trambaix tram system. The station was initially intended to be named Cardenal Reig, a street in the area, or Sant Ramon, the former name of the Trambaix stop.

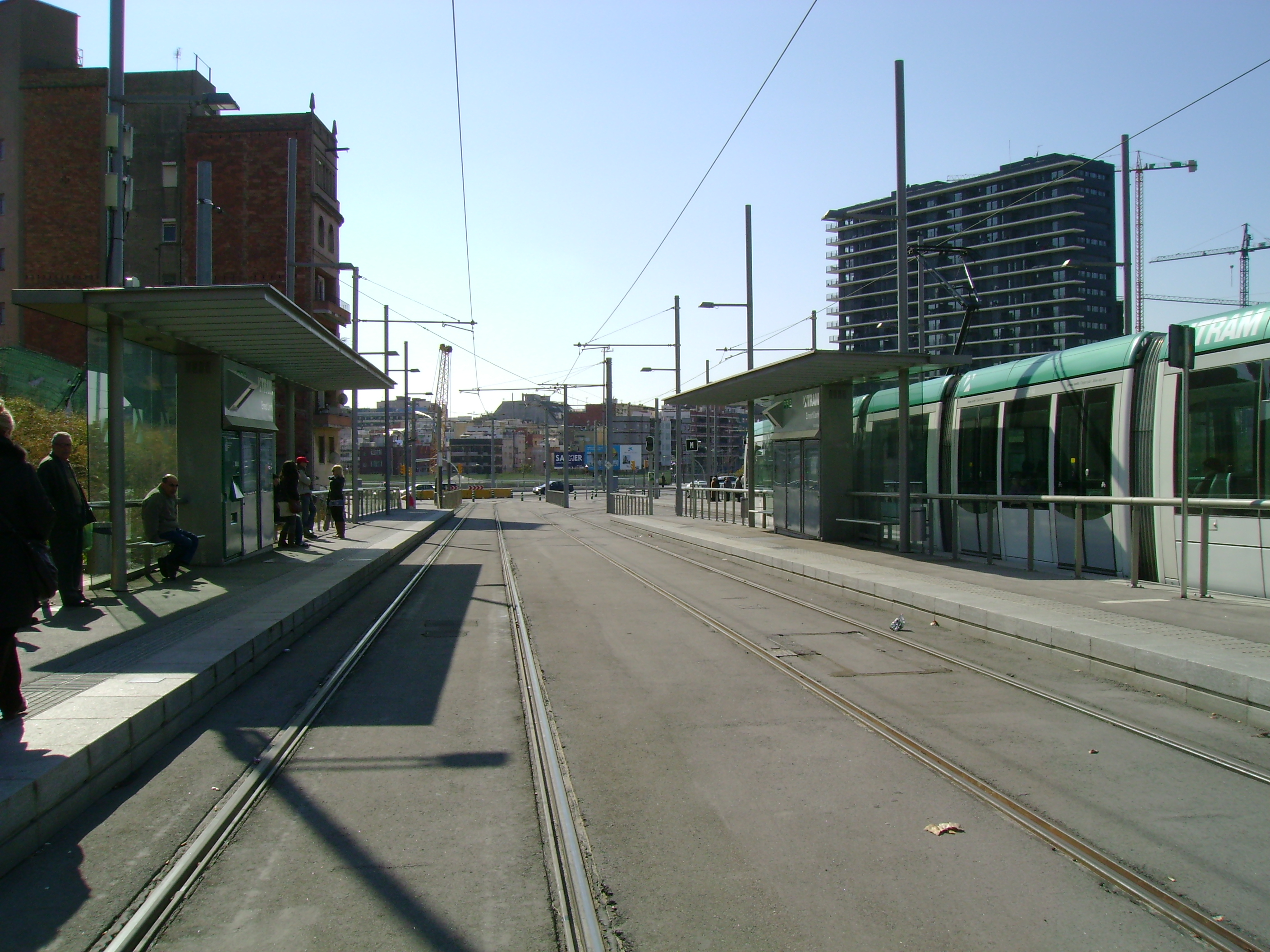
Ernest Lluch tramway station

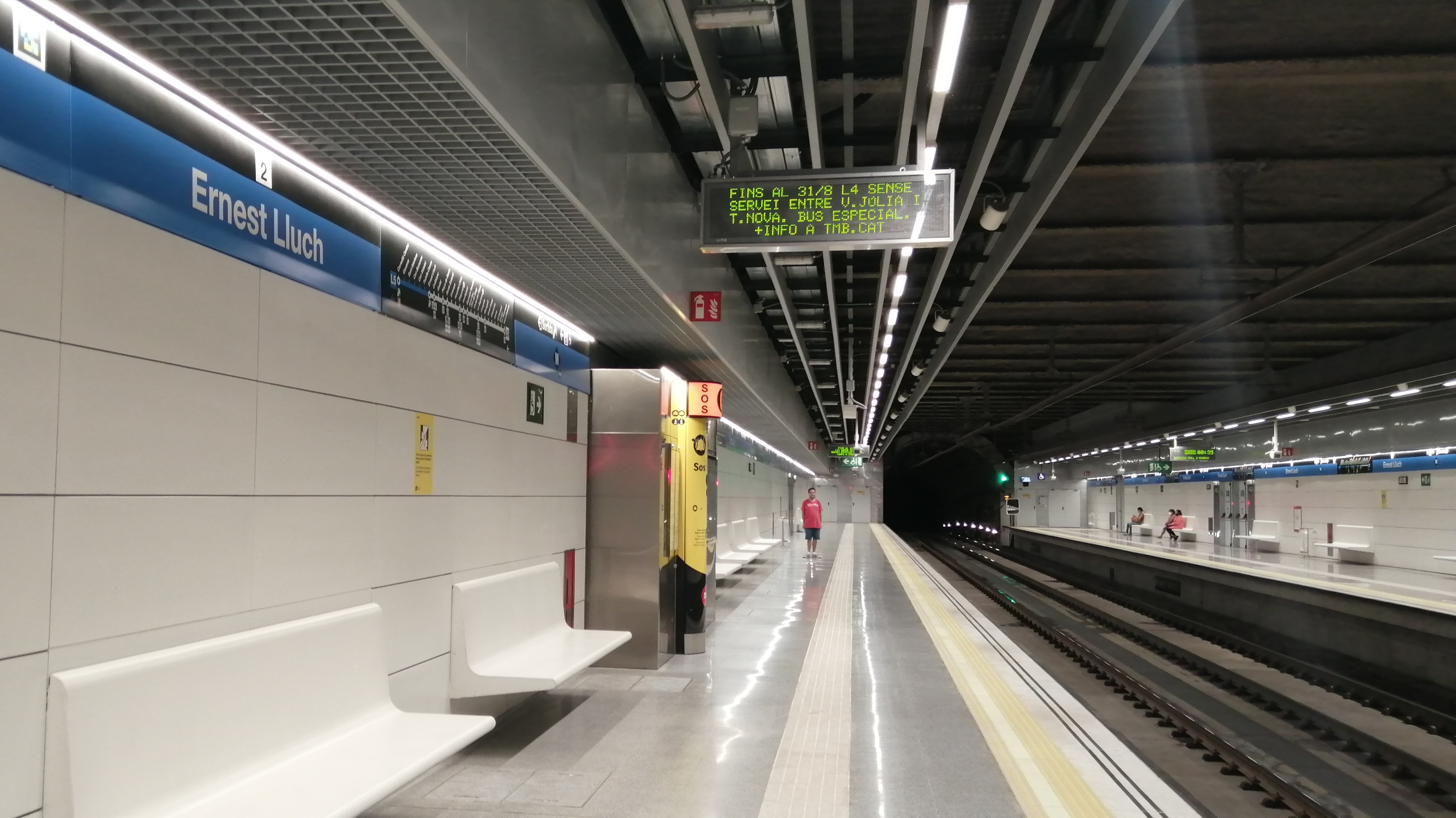
Ernest Lluch metro station

== Rail services ==
Preceding station	TRAM	Following station
Can Rigal towards Bon Viatge	T1	Zona Universitària towards Francesc Macià
Can Rigal towards Llevant-Les Planes	T2	Zona Universitària towards Francesc Macià
Can Rigal towards Sant Feliu – Consell Comarcal	T3	Zona Universitària towards Francesc Macià
Preceding station	Metro	Following station
Pubilla Cases towards Cornellà Centre	L5	Collblanc towards Vall d'Hebron
