= Pubilla Cases station =

Metro station in Barcelona, Spain

Coordinates: 41°22′23″N 2°6′22″E

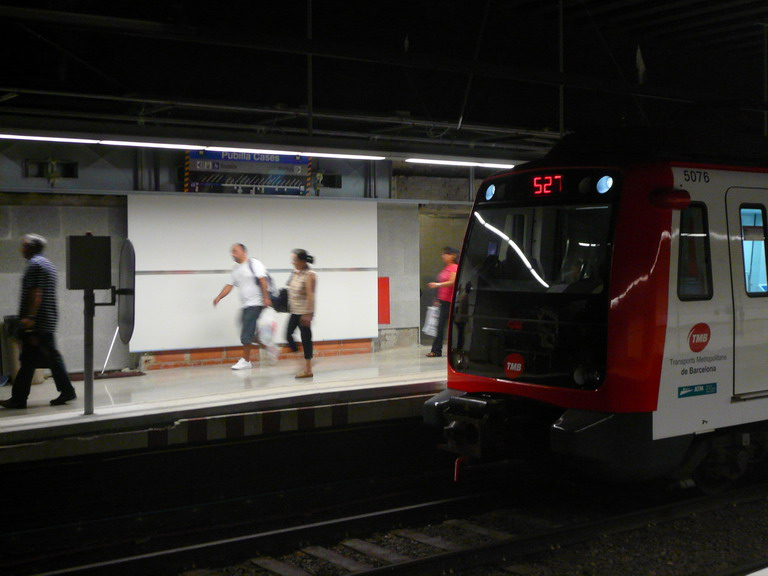

Pubilla Cases (Catalan pronunciation: [puˈβiʎə ˈkazəs]) is a station on line 5 of the Barcelona Metro.

The station is located underneath Doctor Ramon Solanich in L'Hospitalet de Llobregat, between Plaça Mare de Déu del Pilar and Carrer El·lipse. It was opened in 1973 and served as terminus until the extension to Sant Ildefons in 1976.

The side-platform station has a ticket hall on either end, the western one with two accesses, the eastern one (at platform level) with one access.

== Services ==
Preceding station	Metro	Following station
Can Vidalet towards Cornellà Centre	L5	Ernest Lluch towards Vall d'Hebron

== See also ==
- List of Barcelona Metro stations
- Transport in L'Hospitalet de Llobregat
