= Genis =

Genis may refer to:

== Places ==
- Génis, a municipality in France

== People ==
=== Given name ===
- Genís Boadella (born 1979), Spanish lawyer and politician
- Genís García (born 1978), Andorran footballer
- Genís García Junyent (born 1975), or simply Genís, Spanish footballer
- Genís Montolio (born 1996), Spanish footballer

=== Surname ===
- Alexander Genis (born 1953), Russian-American writer
- Daniel Genis (born 1978), Russian-American journalist, writer and media personality
- Sagi Genis (born 2004), Israeli footballer
- Tim Genis, American timpanist

== Fictional characters ==
- The Genis Sage, a character in the video game Tales of Symphonia
- Genis-Vell, a Marvel superhero

== Music ==
- The Italian word for alto horn
- "Genís" (song), a 2022 song by Rosalía

== See also ==
- Saint-Genis (disambiguation)
- Sant Genís (disambiguation)
