= Hospital Clínic station =

Metro station in Barcelona, Spain

Coordinates: 41°23′16″N 2°9′1″E

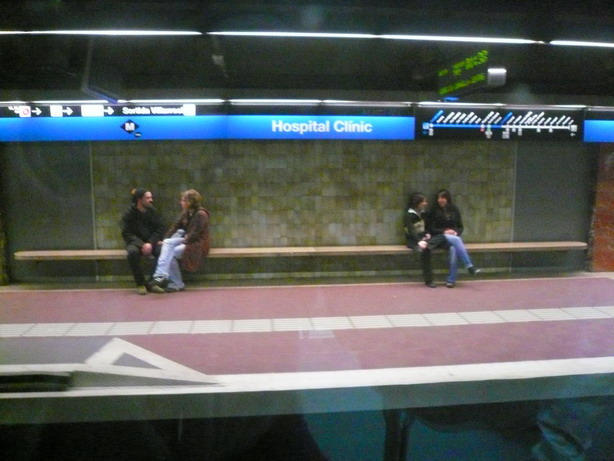
The station's platforms as seen from a carriage window.

Hospital Clínic (Catalan pronunciation: [uspiˈtal ˈklinik]) is a station in the Barcelona Metro network, named after the Hospital Clínic i Provincial de Barcelona located across the street, in the Eixample district of Barcelona. It serves line 5 and gives access to the hospital without walking.

The station, which opened in 1969, is part of the central section of L5. It is located under Carrer Rosselló, between Carrer del Comte d'Urgell and Carrer de Villarroel.

== Services ==
Preceding station	Metro	Following station
Entença towards Cornellà Centre	L5	Diagonal towards Vall d'Hebron
