= Sant Genís =

Sant Genís (Catalan and Occitan for 'Saint Genesius') may refer to the following places:

- Sant Genís dels Agudells, Barcelona, Catalonia, Spain
  - Vall d'Hebron – Sant Genís, a Barcelona Metro station
- Sant Genís de Bellera, Pallars Jussà, Catalonia, Spain
- Saint-Génis-des-Fontaines, Pyrénées-Orientales, France, known locally as Sant Genís de Fontanes
- Saint-Genis, Hautes-Alpes, France, known locally as Sant Genís

== See also ==
- Saint-Genis (disambiguation)
