= Badal station =

Metro station in Barcelona, Spain

Coordinates: 41.376°N 2.129°E

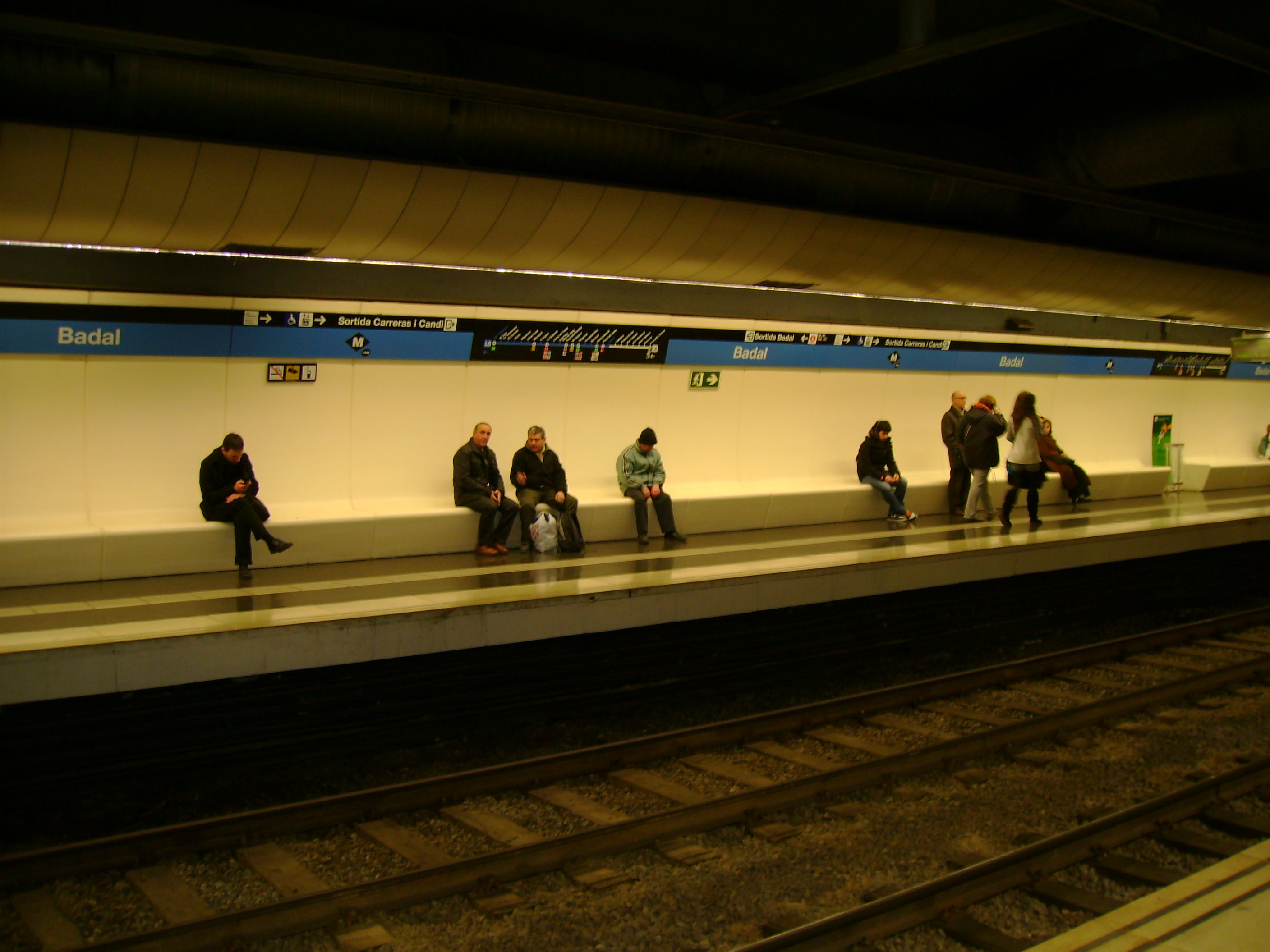
Badal metrostation

Badal (Catalan pronunciation: [bəˈðal]) is a station on line 5 of the Barcelona Metro.

The station is located underneath Carrer de Sants, between Carrer Arizala and Carrer Sant Feliu de Guíxols. It was opened in 1969.

The side-platform station has a ticket hall on either end, the western one with two accesses at Carrer Arizala and Carrer Carreras Candi, the eastern one with one access at Carrer de Sants.

== Services ==
Preceding station	Metro	Following station
Collblanc towards Cornellà Centre	L5	Plaça de Sants towards Vall d'Hebron
