= Can Boixeres station =

Metro station in Barcelona, Spain

Coordinates: 41°21′58.83″N 2°5′26.47″E

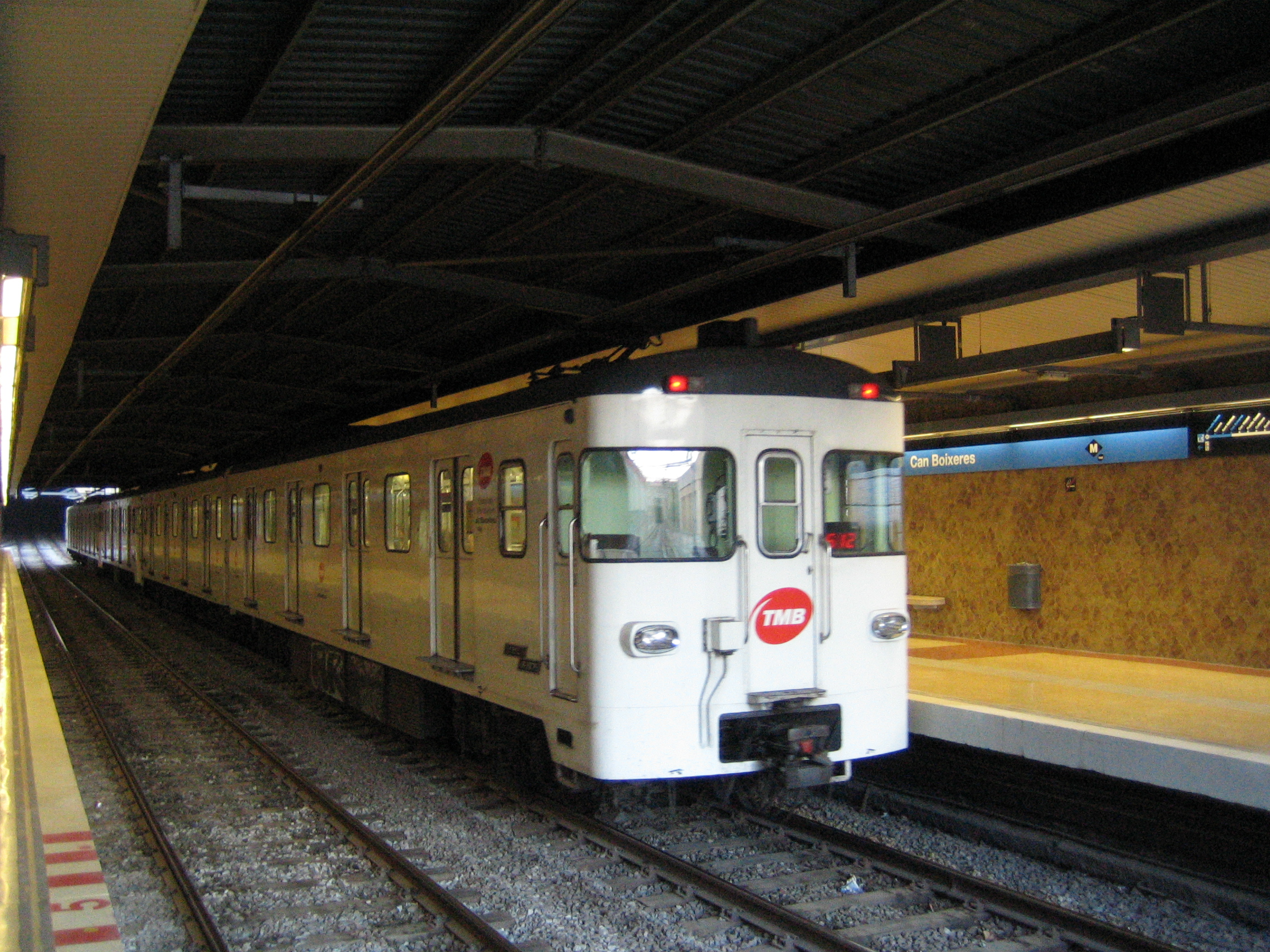
Can Boixeres station platforms

Can Boixeres (Catalan pronunciation: [ˈkam buˈʃeɾəs]) is a station on line 5 of the Barcelona Metro. The station is located on an open-air section of track between Carrer de l'Estronci and Camí de Can Boixeres, just south of the Ronda de Dalt, in L'Hospitalet de Llobregat. It was opened in 1976.

This station is one of Barcelona's few above-ground metro stations, although the platforms and rails are roofed. The single ticket hall, with one access, is located on the second storey. In 2024, new digital displays were installed in the station as part of 5.2 million euro project to upgrade stations across the network.

There is a large train garage facility nearby.

== Services ==
| Preceding station | Metro | Following station |
|---|---|---|
| Sant Ildefons towards Cornellà Centre | L5 | Can Vidalet towards Vall d'Hebron |

== See also ==
- Transport in L'Hospitalet de Llobregat
