= Can Vidalet station =

Metro station in Barcelona, Spain

Coordinates: 41°22′16″N 2°5′58″E

Platforms

Can Vidalet (Catalan pronunciation: [ˈkam biðəˈlɛt]) is a station on line 5 of the Barcelona Metro.

The station is located underneath Carrer de la Maladeta, between Carrer de la Mina and Carrer Hortènsia in Esplugues de Llobregat and L'Hospitalet de Llobregat. It was opened in 1976. Originally and before 1982 was named 'Maladeta'.

The side-platform station has a single ticket hall with two access: 1) career Hortènsia (built in 1976); 2) career Maladeta. The building of the second access (2010) had been long promised but the opinion of the affected neighbours was divided.

== Services ==
Preceding station	Metro	Following station
Can Boixeres towards Cornellà Centre	L5	Pubilla Cases towards Vall d'Hebron

== See also ==
- List of Barcelona Metro stations
- Transport in L'Hospitalet de Llobregat
