= Gavarra station =

Barcelona Metro station

Coordinates: 41.357°N 2.080°E

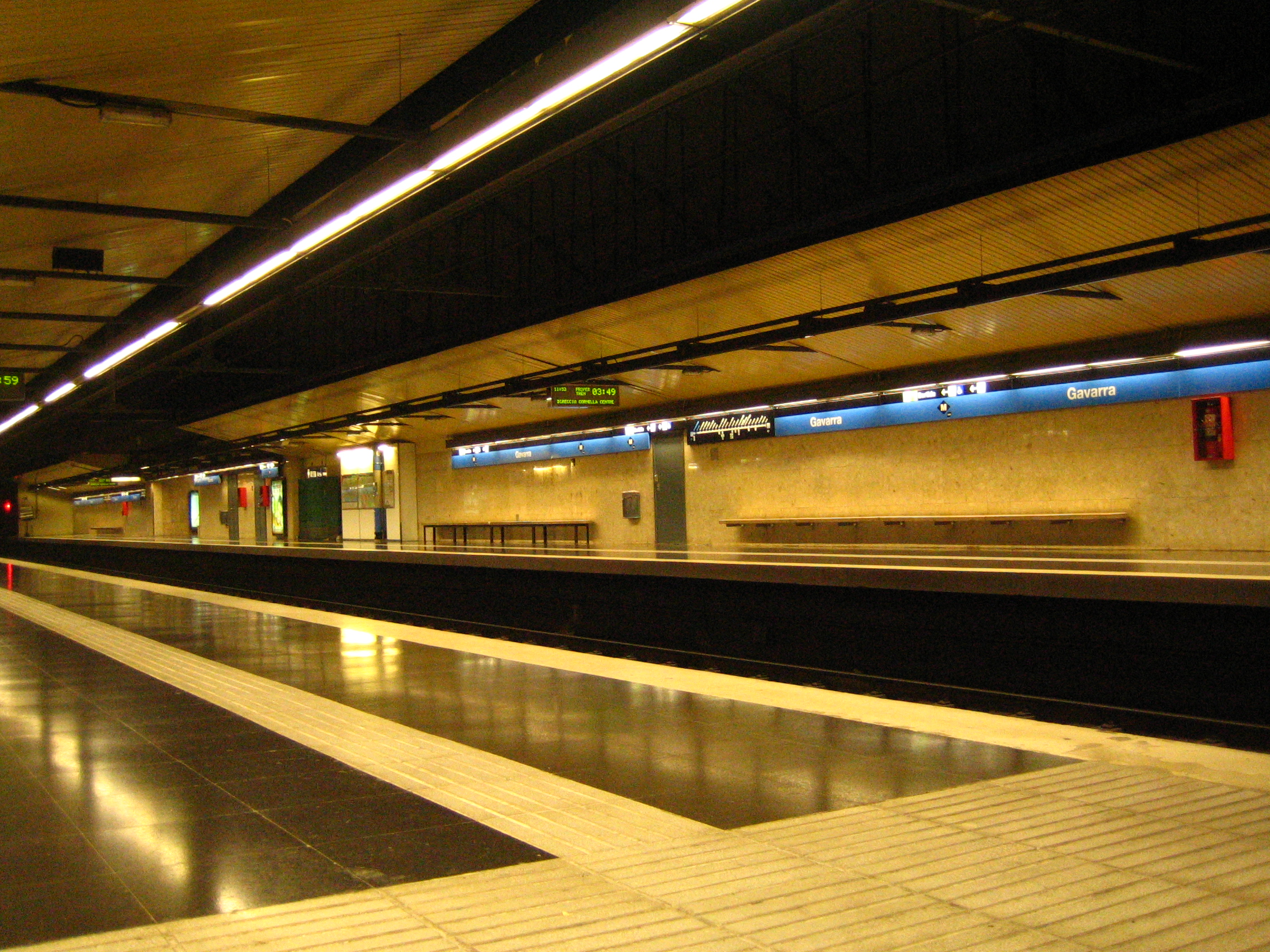

Gavarra (Catalan pronunciation: [ɡəˈβarə]) is a station on line 5 of the Barcelona Metro.

The station is located underneath Avinguda Salvador Allende, between Carrer de l'Anoia and Carrer de l'Empordà, in Cornellà de Llobregat. It was opened in 1983.

The side-platform station has a single ticket hall with two accesses.

== Services ==
Preceding station	Metro	Following station
Cornellà Centre Terminus	L5	Sant Ildefons towards Vall d'Hebron
