= Saint-Genis =

Saint-Genis may refer to several communes in France:

- Saint-Genis, Hautes-Alpes, in the Hautes-Alpes department
- Saint-Genis, former commune of the Isère department, now part of Mens
- Saint-Genis-d'Hiersac, in the Charente department
- Saint-Genis-de-Blanzac, former commune of the Charente department, now part of Cressac-Saint-Genis
- Saint-Genis-de-Saintonge, in the Charente-Maritime department
- Saint-Genis-du-Bois, in the Gironde department
- Saint-Genis-Laval, in the Rhône department
- Saint-Genis-l'Argentière, in the Rhône department
- Saint-Genis-les-Ollières, in the Rhône department
- Saint-Genis-Pouilly, in the Ain department
- Saint-Genis-sur-Menthon, in the Ain department
- Saint-Génis-des-Fontaines, in the Pyrénées-Orientales department

== See also ==
- Saint Genesius (disambiguation)
- Sant Genís (disambiguation)
