= Raid CentraleSupélec =

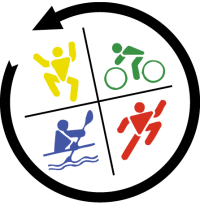
- Date: April–May each year
- Location: France; Switzerland
- Event type: Student Organized Adventure Racing
- Established: 1999
- Website: raidcs.com
- Participants: 220

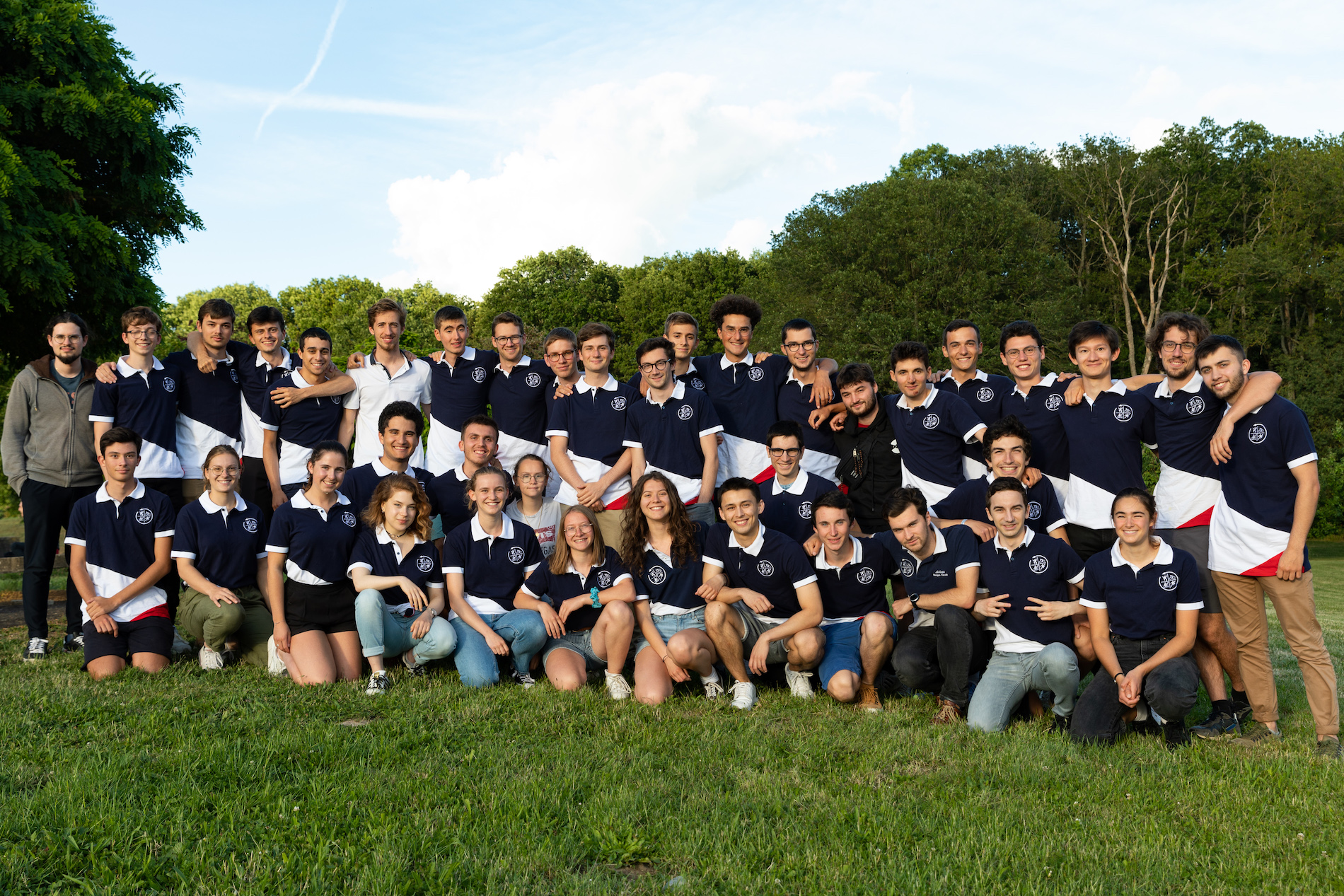
Organising team of the 2023 Raid CentraleSupélec

The Raid CentraleSupélec is an annual 5-day adventure race organised by students from the French engineering school CentraleSupélec. Students and company managers from all over the world come every year to join the competition. Created in 1999, it was the first French student organization to obtain the ISO 9001 and ISO 14001 double certification.

The Raid CentraleSupélec is centered on trail running and mountain biking but it also includes orienteering, rafting and rock climbing. The distance travelled each day ranges from 50 to 70 km.

In 2017, the Raid Centrale Paris became Raid CentraleSupélec after the merger between Ecole Centrale Paris and Supélec.

== The event ==
The Raid is organised for students and company managers from diverse backgrounds to promote informal exchanges between students and companies. This event is very physically demanding and requires appropriate preparation. The selection of the teams is mostly based on the previous sporting performances of the competitors in order to ensure high sports performances during the race.

=== Sports ===
Each year the Raid encompasses three main sports:

- running
- mountain biking
- orienteering

These three events are present each day; you can also find sections of white-water sports or sports with ropes from time to time.

A typical Raid-day is as follows:

- an early start (it might be at night), mass start or spread out.
- a 20-km section of mountain biking or running
- a checkpoint to rest and regain energy
- another section of mountain biking or running, different from the previous one
- the fun activity of the day
- one last mountain biking or running section, to end the race

A ceremony is held every evening to end the day, to introduce the partners and the teams and to reward the best competitors of the day. A closing ceremony is held on the last evening and awards are given to the winners. There are also other specific prizes.

=== The VIP day ===
A VIP day, less sportingly demanding, enables student teams to meet the HRs of the different partners at the midday checkpoint and during a VIP meal in the evening to meet and exchange resumes.

=== A few figures ===
- 200 to 250 km travelled in 5 days
- 8000m of combined elevation gain
- 200-220 competitors
- 100 staff members (students from CentraleSupélec engineering school, 70 first year students and 30 second year students).

== History ==
The Raid CentraleSupélec was founded in 1999 under the name ‘Raid Total Centrale Paris’. Students from the engineering school Centrale Paris had the idea of designing a sports event gathering students and professionals from the corporate world. The Raid was then the first French student organization to obtain the ISO 9001 and ISO 14001 double certification; it was ranked tenth in the ‘Le Point Etudiant’ French student associations rankings.

=== The 2012 edition ===
The fourteenth Raid Centrale Paris edition, the Val de Durance edition, took place from the 22nd to 27 April 2012; it crossed the towns of Guillestre, Chorges, Gap, Curbans, Saint-Genis and Sisteron, in the Alps.

=== The 2013 edition ===
The fifteenth Raid Centrale Paris edition, the Pirineus edition, took place from the 5th to 10 April in the Eastern Pyrenees; it crossed the towns of Matemale, Vernet-les-Bains, Prades, Vinça, Maureillas-las-Illas and Collioure.

=== The 2014 edition ===
The sixteenth Raid Centrale Paris edition, the Helvetia edition, was the first one to take place in a foreign country. It took place from 27 April to 2 May in Switzerland; it crossed the towns of Château d’Oex, Gruyères, Schwarzsee, Thun, Brienz and Sarnen.

=== The 2015 edition ===
The seventeenth Raid Centrale Paris edition, the Provençalpes edition, took place from 26 April to 1 May 2015; it crossed the towns of the Verdon Gorge.

=== The 2016 edition ===
The eighteenth edition of the freshly rebranded Raid CentraleSupélec, the Arvernis edition, took place from the 22nd to 27 April 2016; it crossed the towns of Riom, Volvi and Le Mont-Dore (France) in the Puy-de-Dôme.

=== The 2017 edition ===
The nineteenth Raid CentraleSupeléc edition, the Occitania edition, took place from April 17 to April 21 to in the Haut-Languedoc region, crossing the famous Viaduc de Millau, the highest suspended bridge in the world.

=== The 2018 edition ===
The twentieth Raid CentraleSupélec edition, named Cima de Ventour, took place from April 27 to May 1 in the Provence region, featuring the giant of Provence, the well-known Mont Ventoux.

=== The 2019 edition ===
The twenty-first Raid CentraleSupélec edition, named Itsas Mendi, took place from April 24 to April 28, in the Basque Country, featuring a start in Biarritz and a finish in Hendaye, on the seaside.

=== The 2020 edition ===
The twenty-second Raid CentrleSupélec, named Odyserre, should've taken place from April 15 to April 19, linking the bottom of the Durance Valley up to the infamous Serre-Ponçon Lake. However, this edition was cancelled as lockdown was imposed in France at that time.

=== The 2021 edition ===
The twenty-third Raid CentraleSupélec, named Transalpia, should've taken place from April 28 to May 2, crossing the Alps from Grenoble to Annecy. Once again, the sanitary conditions in France forced the organisation to cancel this edition.

=== The 2022 edition ===
The twenty-fourth Raid CentraleSupélec, the first post-Covid edition, named Sequania, took place from May 4 to May 8, in the Jura mountains, featuring the very steep Colomby de Gex and crossing the Les Rousses ski resort.

=== The sites of the Raid since 1999 ===
- 1999 (1st edition) : Dévoluy
- 2000 : Queyra
- 2001 : Cévennes
- 2002 : Hautes-Pyrénées - winner: ENS student team
- 2003 : Verdon Gorge - winner: EDF Septen
- 2004 : Northern Catalonia - winners: ENS Cachan, Telecom SudParis, École nationale des sciences géographiques student teams
- 2005 : Lake Geneva - winner: EDF
- 2006 : Dauphiné-Savoie - winner: Plastic Omnium
- 2007 : Vercors - winner: EDF
- 2008 (10th edition): French Basque Country - winner : Plastic Omnium
- 2009 : Ardèche - winner: Institut Français de Mécanique Avancée student team
- 2010 : Cathar Country - winner: EDF
- 2011 : Corsica - winner: Plastic Omnium
- 2012 : Val de Durance - winner: the student/corporate team Total - ESSEC Business School
- 2013 : Pyrénées-Orientales - winners: KTH student team
- 2014 : Switzerland - winner: Ernst & Young
- 2015 : Verdon Gorge - winners (ex aequo): Sysnav and École Polytechnique student team
- 2016 : Auvergne - winner: Sysnav
- 2017 : Haut-Languedoc Regional Nature Park
- 2018 : Provence - winners: EDF
- 2019 : Basque Country - winners: Airbus
- 2020 : Durance Valley - cancelled due to the Covid-19 pandemic
- 2021 : the Alps - cancelled due to the Covid-19 pandemic
- 2022 : Jura - winners: "Les Raidstacés" a CentraleSupélec student team
- 2023 : Drome - winners: "Les Raidstacés" a CentraleSupélec student team
- 2024 : Ardeche - winners: "Praidators" a CentraleSupélec student team
- 2025 : Serre-ponçon lake - winners: "Praidators" a CentraleSupélec student team

=== 10 April 2008: the anniversary day ===
A special day was organised in la Défense on April 10, 2008 to celebrate the 10th anniversary of the event. It enabled the Raid staff to present the Raid to companies of the business section and it also enabled everybody who had participated to the nine previous Raid editions (competitors, members of staff) to meet again to share their memories.

== The Prologue ==
Since the 2006 edition a day of sports events is organised every year in February or March just before the Raid, called the Prologue. From 2006 to 2013 it took place in Île-de-France. About 200 competitors, all from the student world, compete in teams during a Raid-like day:

- An early mass start
- Mountain biking
- Running
- Other outdoor activities
- Checkpoints
- A closing ceremony

In 2014, the Prologue was a little bit different: it was organised in the Loire valley. The competitors arrived at 11pm on March, Friday 7th. They ran at night for about 10 km. On the Saturday the event looked like every other Prologue. Checkpoints were located near castles. The Prologue enables competitors to ‘warm up’ before the Raid which is held about two months after. It’s a day where student teams meet and train for the Raid. It allows students not sufficiently trained to run a five-day race to experience a Raid-like day.

=== The locations of the Prologue since 2006 ===
- 2006 : Forest of Fontainebleau
- 2007 : Forest of Fontainebleau
- 2008 : Forest of Rambouillet
- 2009 : Forest of Fontainebleau
- 2010 : Versailles
- 2011 : Vallée de Chevreuse
- 2012 : Forest of Chantilly
- 2013 : Regional Park of the French Gâtinais
- 2014 : Châteaux of the Loire Valley
- 2015 : Norman Switzerland
- 2016 : Vallée de Chevreuse

== The Saclay Night N' Day ==
In 2017, the Prologue became the Saclay Night N' Day. It's a 24 hours event in Vallée de Chevreuse that starts with a night run on Friday evening and a race on Saturday composed of several loops with trail, mountain biking, orienteering and others activities that the teams can choose to do in the order they want. Every loop or activity gives points to the team and the ranking is unveiled during the Saturday evening ceremony, with movies and pictures of the event.

=== The locations of the Night N' Day ===
- Ever since 2017 : The race has been held in the Vallée de Chevreuse, and the finished has been taking place in the town of Rambouillet.

== The organisation ==
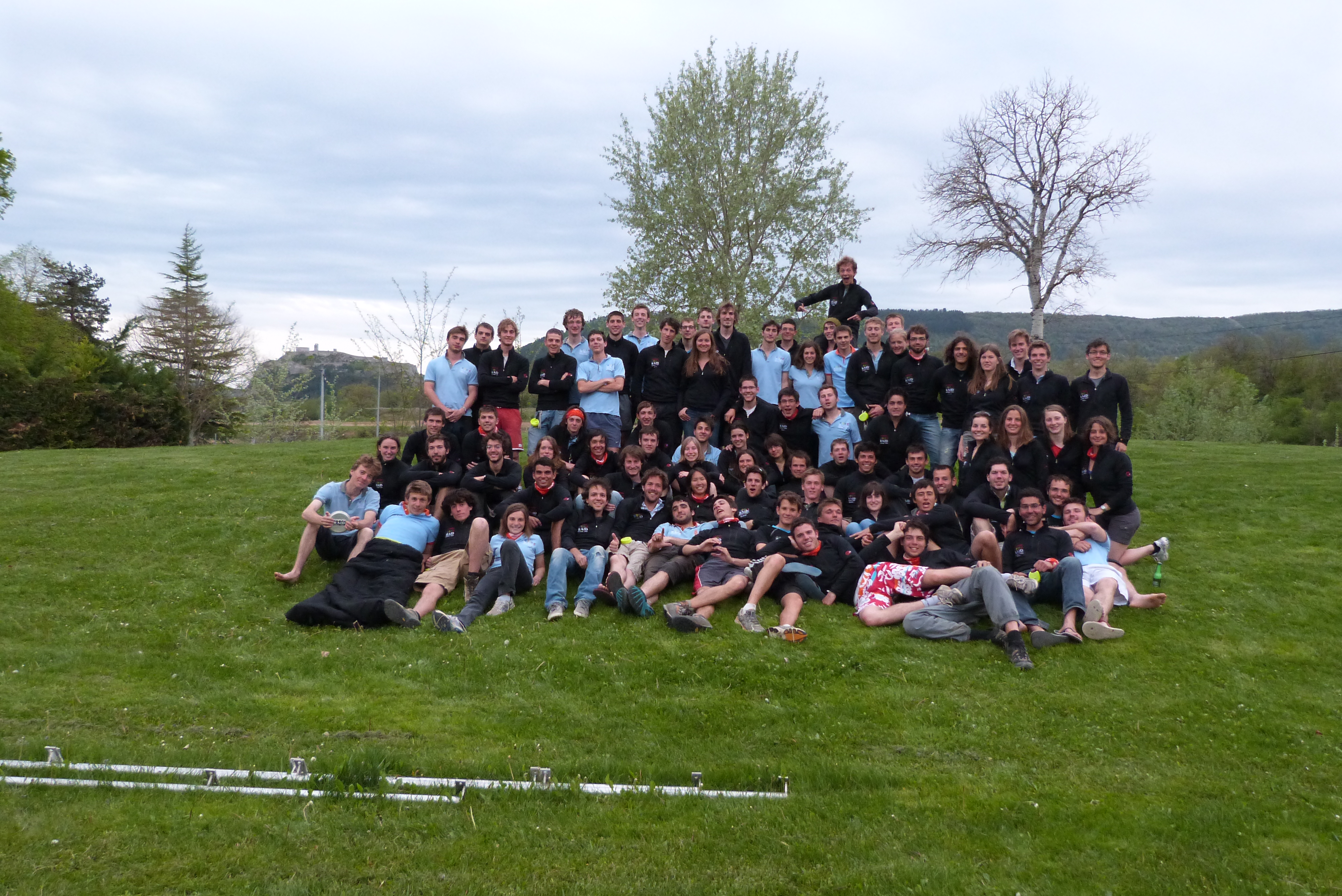
Organising team of the 2016 Raid CentraleSupélec

Each edition is organised by a different team of 30 CentraleSupélec second year students and 70 first year students. The staff is divided into different sectors led by a 2nd year students (Itinerary, logistics, security, communication, companies, competitors, international...) dealing with a specific task of the Raid. During the Raid responsibilities are redefined every day to enable 1st year students to get more responsibility. Finally, about a month after the Raid handovers enable 1st year students to take over the work. The quality process and the continuous improvement have been rewarded in 2009 with the ISO 9001 certification.

=== The Raid and the environment ===
In the Raid, environment matters. That’s why the Raid dedicates a day to the environment on the race. Moreover, most of the chosen regions are preserved areas that need to be respected. These efforts were recognized in 2005 with the ISO 14001 certification. Waste is sorted on each Raid event and measures are implemented to limit fuel and paper consumption. Furthermore, a part of the disposable dishes are biodegradable to limit waste production. The Raid measures their Carbon footprint each year to limit their environmental impact year after year.

== See also ==
- Adventure Racing
- École centrale Paris
- ISO 9001
- ISO 14001
