= Barcelona Metro line 5 =

Rapid transit line in Barcelona, Spain

Coordinates: 41.430°N 2.162°E

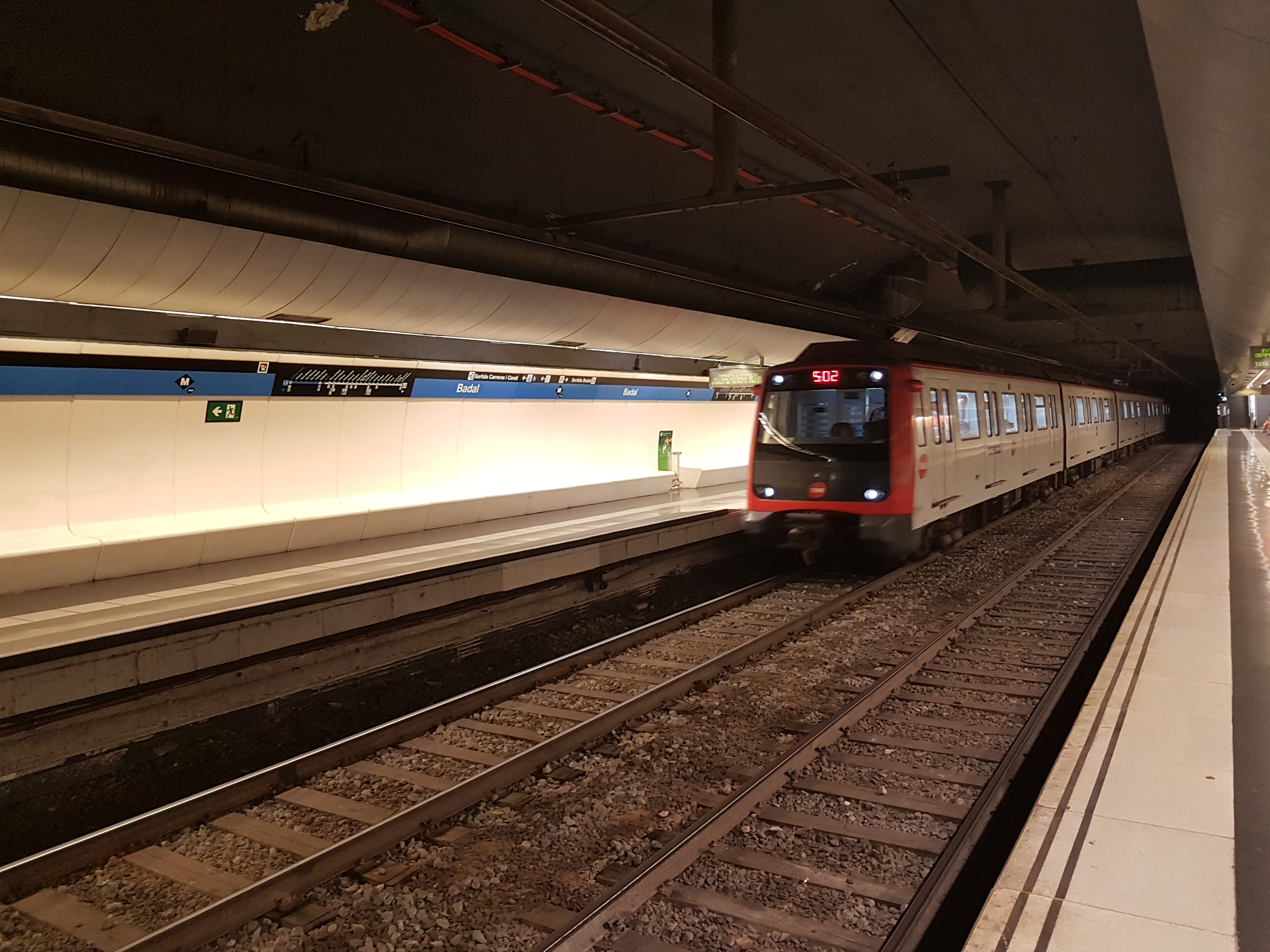
- 5000 series train at Badal

Overview
- Service type: Rapid transit
- System: Barcelona Metro
- Locale: Barcelona
- First service: 1959; 67 years ago
- Current operator: TMB

Route
- Termini: Cornellà Centre; Vall d'Hebron
- Stops: 27
- Distance travelled: 18.8 km (11.7 mi)
- Average journey time: 30 minutes

Technical
- Rolling stock: 5000 series Can Boixeres, Vilapicina, Sant Genís depots
- Track gauge: 1,435 mm (4 ft 8 1/2 in) standard gauge
- Electrification: 1,200 V DC rigid overhead wire
- Track owner: TMB

Line 5 (Catalan pronunciation: [ˈlini.ə ˈsiŋ]), often known as Línia Blava ([ˈlini.ə ˈblaβə]; Blue line), is a rapid transit line of the Barcelona Metro network, operated by TMB and part of the ATM fare-integrated transport network.

Originally opened in 1959, Line 5 crosses the north of L'Hospitalet de Llobregat and Barcelona's Eixample district, with its termini serving the municipality of Cornellà and the district of Horta-Guinardó.

== Overview ==
Line 5 is 18.8 km (11.7 mi) long and has 27 stations. As most lines in the Barcelona Metro network, the line has 1,435 mm standard-gauge track and overhead wire electrification. Its current termini are Cornellà Centre, which provides connections to the Rodalies and Trambaix networks and Vall d'Hebron, which is an interchange station with Line 3 of the Barcelona Metro.

The line runs from Cornellà, in the Baix Llobregat comarca, to the Horta-Guinardó district of Barcelona, serving the northern boroughs of Hospitalet and the districts of Sants-Montjuïc and Eixample. Line 5 is currently the only Barcelona Metro line that serves the municipality of Esplugues, with the station of Can Vidalet having both of its accesses in the municipality (while the station itself is located within the limits of L'Hospitalet).

Line 5 is the second most used line in the Barcelona Metro after Line 1, with 111 million passengers using it in 2024.

== History ==
Line 5's initial section was opened on July 21, 1959. It was initially known as Line II and was part of the Ferrocarril Metropolitano de Barcelona (FMB), one of the two rapid transit companies that would merge to form the Barcelona Metro. The initial section was a 5 station, 2.3 km route linking Vilapicina to La Sagrera, where a connection to FMB's Metro Transversal was provided. The line saw the pioneer use of a photoelectric cell-based automatic train operation system developed by the Barcelona Metro in 1960. In 1967, it would be extended from Vilapicina to Horta.

A separate project, known as Transversal Alt or Line V would open in 1969, with the initial section running from Collblanc (then known as Sant Ramon) to Diagonal. In 1970, the line would be extended from Diagonal to La Sagrera, with Line II merging into Line V. The line was expanded towards Hospitalet and Cornellà in the 1970s, with an extension to Pubilla Cases opening in 1973 and a further one to Sant Ildefons in 1976. The line would reach its current terminus in Cornellà Centre in 1983.

In 1982, with a major reorganization of TMB's network, several stations were renamed (such as General Mola, which became Verdaguer) and Line V became Line 5, as Roman numerals were abandoned.

The line would be extended from Horta towards Vall d'Hebron during the 2000s. While works began in 2002, construction ran into trouble as tunneling works caused a major collapse in El Carmel neighborhood in 2005. 3 buildings had to be demolished and around a thousand neighbors were displaced. The extension to the line's current terminus at Vall d'Hebron would finally open in 2010, providing a new connection to Line 3.

A new infill station, Ernest Lluch, opened in 2021 in Les Corts, providing a connection to the existing Trambaix station.

=== Chronology ===
- 1959 – La Sagrera-Vilapicina section opened (as the former Line II)
- 1967 – Vilapicina-Horta section opened (as the former Line II)
- 1969 – Collblanc-Diagonal section opened as Line V.
- 1970 – Diagonal-Vilapicina section opened. The line then known as Line II is integrated into Line V.
- 1973 – Collblanc-Pubilla Cases section opened.
- 1976 – Pubilla Cases-Sant Ildefons section opened.
- 1982 – Line V becomes Line 5 and several stations change names.
- 1983 – Sant Ildefons-Cornellà Centre section opened.
- 2010 – Horta-Vall d'Hebron section opened.
- 2021 – Ernest Lluch opened.

Evolution of Line 5, 1959–2010

== Stations ==
Station	Image	Location	Opened	Interchanges
Cornellà Centre		Cornellà de Llobregat	23 December 1983	Trambaix Rodalies de Catalunya R1–RG1 (Rodalies de Catalunya) R4 (Rodalies de Catalunya)
Gavarra		Cornellà de Llobregat	23 December 1983	
Sant Ildefons		Cornellà de Llobregat	23 November 1976	
Can Boixeres		L'Hospitalet de Llobregat	23 November 1976	
Can Vidalet		L'Hospitalet de Llobregat	23 November 1976	
Pubilla Cases		L'Hospitalet de Llobregat	5 February 1973	
Ernest Lluch		L'Hospitalet de Llobregat	25 July 2021	Trambaix
Collblanc		L'Hospitalet de Llobregat	3 November 1969	Barcelona Metro Barcelona Metro line 9 Barcelona Metro line 10
Badal		Sants-Montjuïc, Barcelona	3 November 1969	
Plaça de Sants		Sants-Montjuïc, Barcelona	3 November 1969	Barcelona Metro Barcelona Metro line 1
Sants Estació		Sants-Montjuïc, Barcelona	3 November 1969	Renfe
Entença		Eixample, Barcelona	3 November 1969	
Hospital Clínic		Eixample, Barcelona	3 November 1969	
Diagonal		Eixample, Barcelona	3 November 1969	Barcelona Metro Barcelona Metro line 3 Ferrocarrils de la Generalitat de Catalunya Barcelona–Vallès Line
Verdaguer		Eixample, Barcelona	26 June 1970	Barcelona Metro Barcelona Metro line 4 Trambesòs
Sagrada Família		Eixample, Barcelona	26 June 1970	Barcelona Metro Barcelona Metro line 2
Sant Pau | Dos de Maig		Eixample, Barcelona	26 June 1970	
Camp de l'Arpa		Sant Martí, Barcelona	26 June 1970	
La Sagrera		Sant Andreu, Barcelona	21 July 1959	Barcelona Metro Barcelona Metro line 1 Barcelona Metro line 9 Barcelona Metro line 10 Rodalies de Catalunya R3 (Rodalies de Catalunya) R4 (Rodalies de Catalunya)
Congrés		Sant Andreu, Barcelona	21 July 1959	
Maragall		Nou Barris, Barcelona	21 July 1959	Barcelona Metro Barcelona Metro line 4
Virrei Amat		Horta-Guinardó, Barcelona	21 July 1959	
Vilapicina		Horta-Guinardó, Barcelona	21 July 1959	
Horta		Horta-Guinardó, Barcelona	5 October 1967	
El Carmel		Horta-Guinardó, Barcelona	30 July 2010	
El Coll - La Teixonera		Horta-Guinardó, Barcelona	30 July 2010	
Vall d'Hebron		Horta-Guinardó, Barcelona	30 July 2010	Barcelona Metro Barcelona Metro line 3

== See also ==
- List of Barcelona Metro stations
