= Lagrand =

- Part of Garde-Colombe
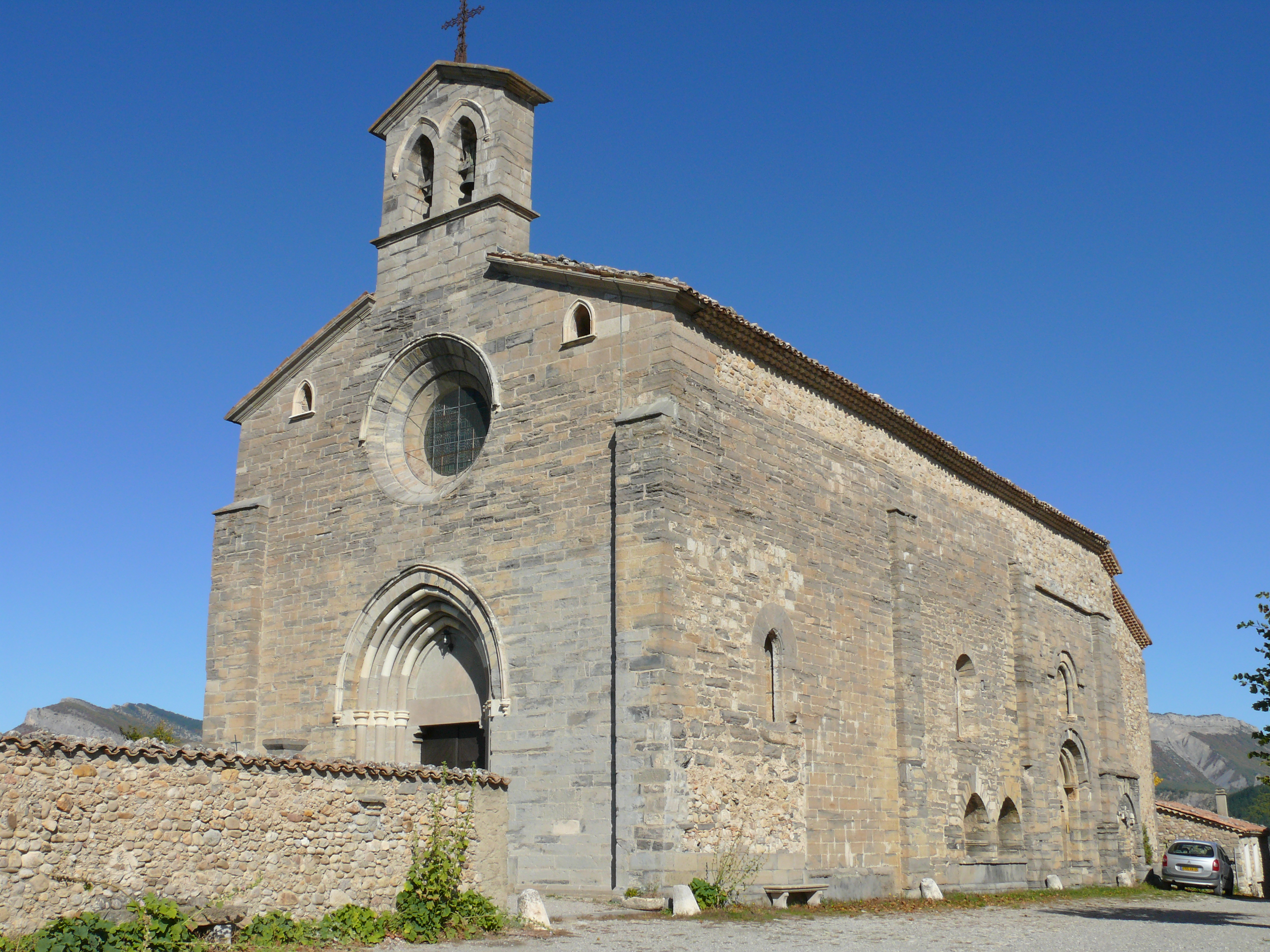
- The church in Lagrand

- Coat of arms
- Location of Lagrand
- Location within France Location within Provence-Alpes-Côte d'Azur
- Coordinates: 44°20′32″N 5°45′23″E
- Country: France
- Region: Provence-Alpes-Côte d'Azur
- Department: Hautes-Alpes
- Arrondissement: Gap
- Canton: Serres
- Commune: Garde-Colombe
- Area^{1}: 6.92 km^{2} (2.67 sq mi)
- Elevation: 650 m (2,130 ft)
- Highest elevation: 1,219 m (3,999 ft)
- Lowest elevation: 581 m (1,906 ft)
- Population (2019): 232
  - Density: 33.5/km^{2} (86.8/sq mi)
- Time zone: UTC+01:00 (CET)
  - Summer (DST): UTC+02:00 (CEST)
- Postal code: 05300
- ^{1} French Land Register data, which excludes lakes, ponds, glaciers > 1 km^{2} (0.386 sq mi or 247 acres) and river estuaries.

Lagrand (French pronunciation: [laɡʁɑ̃]) is a former commune in the Hautes-Alpes department in southeastern France. On 1 January 2016, it was merged into the new commune Garde-Colombe.

== See also ==
- Communes of the Hautes-Alpes department
