= Garde-Colombe =

- Commune
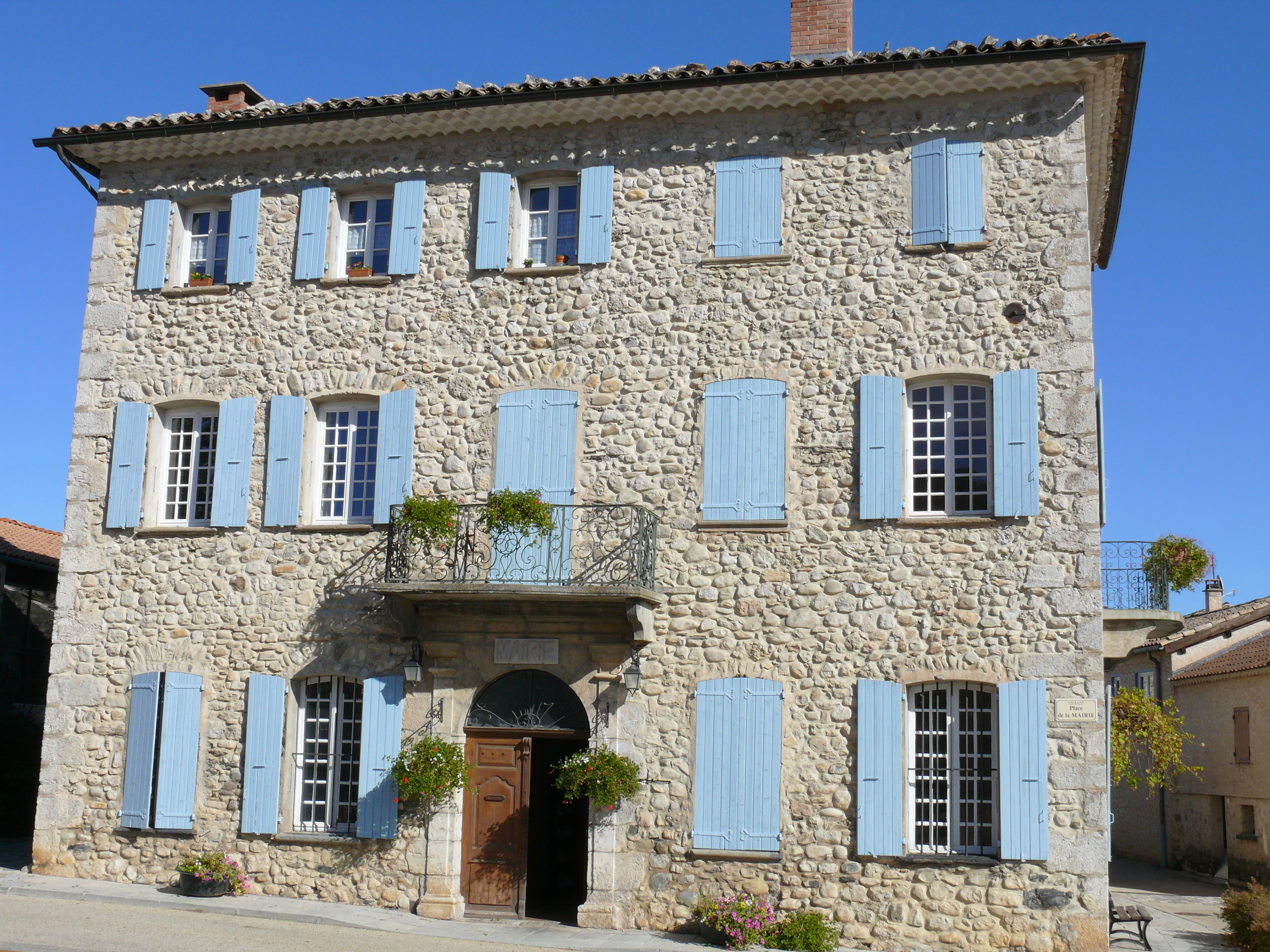
- Location of Garde-Colombe
- Location within France Location within Provence-Alpes-Côte d'Azur
- Coordinates: 44°20′46″N 5°46′16″E
- Country: France
- Region: Provence-Alpes-Côte d'Azur
- Department: Hautes-Alpes
- Arrondissement: Gap
- Canton: Serres

Government
  - Mayor (2026–32): Damien Duranceau
- Area^{1}: 34.61 km^{2} (13.36 sq mi)
- Population (2023): 539
  - Density: 15.6/km^{2} (40.3/sq mi)
- Time zone: UTC+01:00 (CET)
  - Summer (DST): UTC+02:00 (CEST)
- INSEE/Postal code: 05053 /05300
- ^{1} French Land Register data, which excludes lakes, ponds, glaciers > 1 km^{2} (0.386 sq mi or 247 acres) and river estuaries.

Garde-Colombe (Vivaro-Alpine: Garda Colomba) is a commune in the Hautes-Alpes department of southeastern France. The municipality was established on 1 January 2016 and consists of the former communes of Eyguians, Lagrand and Saint-Genis.

== History ==
=== 2016 knife attack ===
The newly minted commune was the location of the 20 July 2016 knife attack on a mother and her three daughters (aged 8, 12, and 14) at a local VVF Lagrand resort. The 8-year old was airlifted by helicopter to Grenoble because of a punctured lung. The perpetrator from Morocco, Mohamed Boufarkouch, shouted "Allah akbar" (Allah is great) several times in jail. Boufarkouch, who has been on disability since 2009, was in Garde-Colombe with his two daughters and his pregnant wife. The prosecutor indicated that terrorism is not seen as a prime motivator, and indicated there were "no signs of religious radicalisation" and the suspect's practice of the Muslim religion "has been moderate."

== See also ==
- Communes of the Hautes-Alpes department
