= Saint-Léger, Charente =

Saint-Léger
- Part of Coteaux du Blanzacais
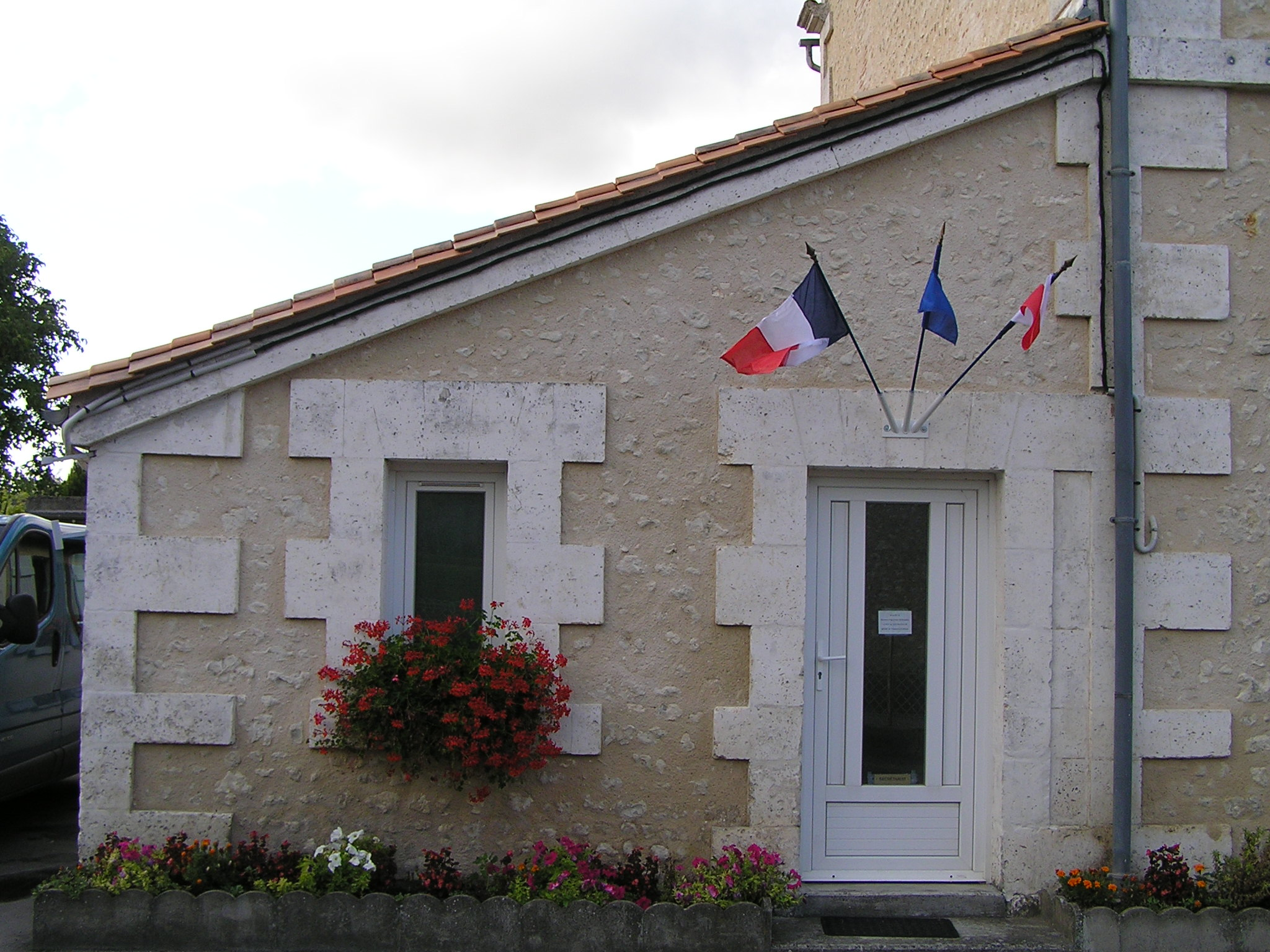
- Town hall
- Location of Saint-Léger
- Location within France Location within Nouvelle-Aquitaine
- Coordinates: 45°27′39″N 0°02′45″E
- Country: France
- Region: Nouvelle-Aquitaine
- Department: Charente
- Arrondissement: Cognac
- Canton: Charente-Sud
- Commune: Coteaux du Blanzacais
- Area^{1}: 4.21 km^{2} (1.63 sq mi)
- Elevation: 100 m (330 ft)
- Highest elevation: 179 m (587 ft)
- Lowest elevation: 76 m (249 ft)
- Population (2018): 128
  - Density: 30.4/km^{2} (78.7/sq mi)
- Time zone: UTC+01:00 (CET)
  - Summer (DST): UTC+02:00 (CEST)
- Postal code: 16250
- ^{1} French Land Register data, which excludes lakes, ponds, glaciers > 1 km^{2} (0.386 sq mi or 247 acres) and river estuaries.

Saint-Léger (French pronunciation: [sɛ̃ leʒe]) is a former commune in the Charente department in southwestern France. On 1 January 2019, it was merged into the commune Coteaux du Blanzacais.

== Population ==
Historical population

| Year | Pop. | ±% p.a. |
|---|---|---|
| 1793 | 186 | — |
| 1821 | 186 | +0.00% |
| 1846 | 210 | +0.49% |
| 1872 | 192 | −0.34% |
| 1901 | 183 | −0.17% |
| 1926 | 165 | −0.41% |
| 1946 | 146 | −0.61% |

| Year | Pop. | ±% p.a. |
|---|---|---|
| 1962 | 145 | −0.04% |
| 1968 | 140 | −0.58% |
| 1975 | 176 | +3.32% |
| 1982 | 181 | +0.40% |
| 1990 | 140 | −3.16% |
| 1999 | 136 | −0.32% |
| 2018 | 128 | −0.32% |

Source: EHESS and INSEE (2018)

== See also ==
- Communes of the Charente department
