= Blanzac-Porcheresse =

- Part of Coteaux du Blanzacais
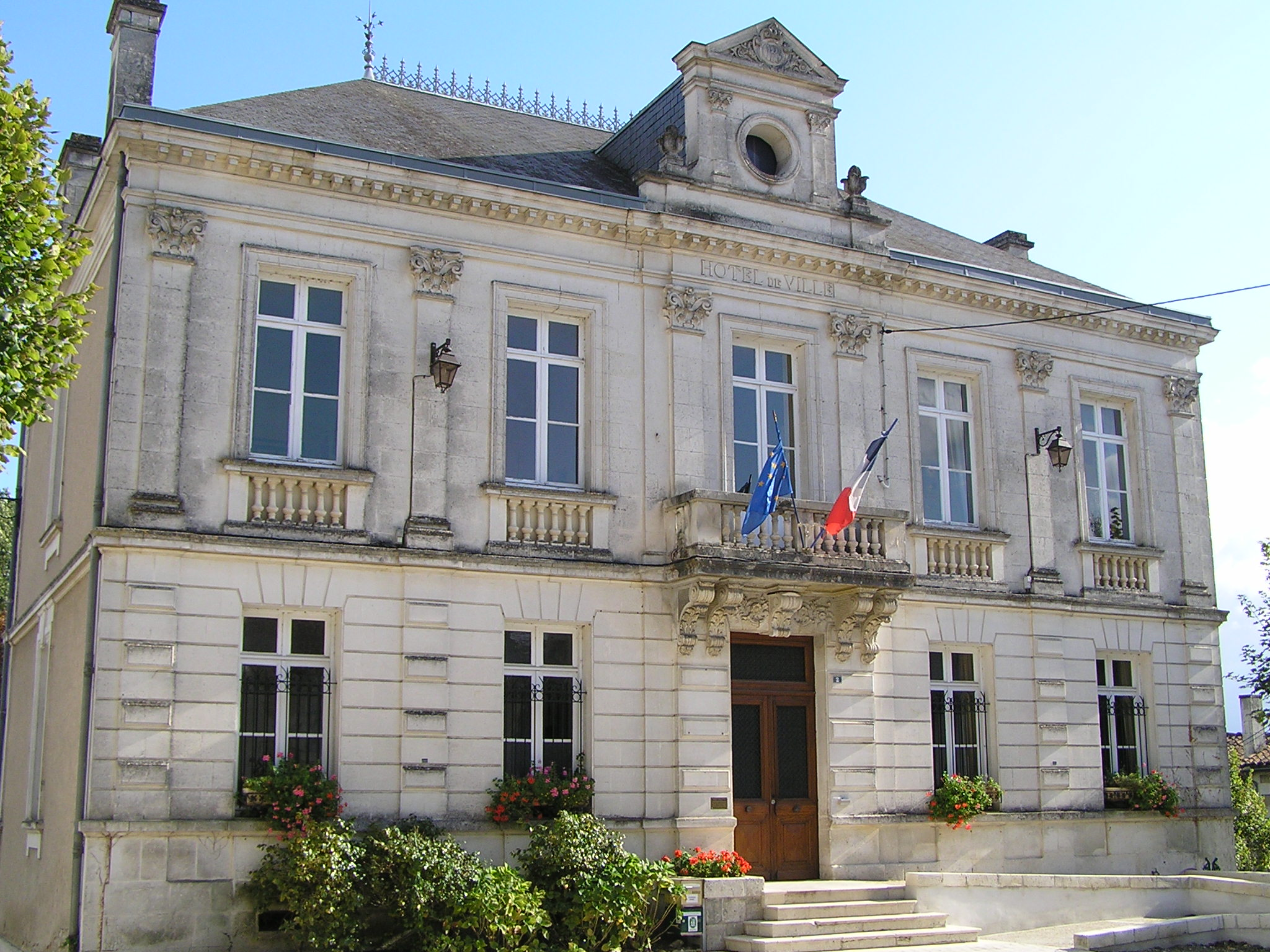
- Town hall

- Coat of arms
- Location of Blanzac-Porcheresse
- Location within France Location within Nouvelle-Aquitaine
- Coordinates: 45°28′38″N 0°01′57″E
- Country: France
- Region: Nouvelle-Aquitaine
- Department: Charente
- Arrondissement: Cognac
- Canton: Charente-Sud
- Commune: Coteaux du Blanzacais
- Area^{1}: 10.84 km^{2} (4.19 sq mi)
- Elevation: 80 m (260 ft)
- Highest elevation: 160 m (520 ft)
- Lowest elevation: 62 m (203 ft)
- Population (2018): 733
  - Density: 67.6/km^{2} (175/sq mi)
- Time zone: UTC+01:00 (CET)
  - Summer (DST): UTC+02:00 (CEST)
- Postal code: 16250
- ^{1} French Land Register data, which excludes lakes, ponds, glaciers > 1 km^{2} (0.386 sq mi or 247 acres) and river estuaries.

Blanzac-Porcheresse (French pronunciation: [blɑ̃zak pɔʁʃəʁɛs]) is a former commune in the Charente department in southwestern France. On 1 January 2017, it was merged into the new commune Coteaux du Blanzacais.

== Population ==
Historical population

Year	Pop.	±% p.a.
1793	649	—
1821	607	−0.24%
1846	719	+0.68%
1872	830	+0.55%
1901	900	+0.28%
1926	752	−0.72%
1946	751	−0.01%
1962	817	+0.53%

Year	Pop.	±% p.a.
1968	852	+0.70%
1975	1,004	+2.37%
1982	874	−1.96%
1990	819	−0.81%
1999	839	+0.27%
2006	836	−0.05%
2018	733	−1.09%

Source: EHESS and INSEE (2018)

== See also ==
- Communes of the Charente department
