= Genesius =

Genesius may refer to:

- Any of several Saints Genesius
- A surname of Poseidon
- Joseph Genesius, tenth-century Byzantine historian
- Genesius Theatre in Reading, Pennsylvania
