= San Genesio =

San Genesio (Italian for 'Saint Genesius') may refer to the following places in Italy:

== Towns ==
- Jenesien / San Genesio Atesino, South Tyrol
- San Genesio ed Uniti, Pavia
- San Genesio, Fabbrico, Reggio Emilia
- San Genesio, Castagneto Po, Turin

== Churches ==
- San Genesio, San Secondo Parmense, Parma

== See also ==
- San Ginesio, Macerata
- League of San Genesio
- Genesio
