= Eyguians =

- Part of Garde-Colombe
- Coat of arms
- Location of Eyguians
- Location within France Location within Provence-Alpes-Côte d'Azur
- Coordinates: 44°20′50″N 5°46′23″E
- Country: France
- Region: Provence-Alpes-Côte d'Azur
- Department: Hautes-Alpes
- Arrondissement: Gap
- Canton: Serres
- Commune: Garde-Colombe
- Area^{1}: 9.37 km^{2} (3.62 sq mi)
- Elevation: 603 m (1,978 ft)
- Highest elevation: 1,200 m (3,900 ft)
- Lowest elevation: 576 m (1,890 ft)
- Population (2019): 235
  - Density: 25.1/km^{2} (65.0/sq mi)
- Time zone: UTC+01:00 (CET)
  - Summer (DST): UTC+02:00 (CEST)
- Postal code: 05300
- ^{1} French Land Register data, which excludes lakes, ponds, glaciers > 1 km^{2} (0.386 sq mi or 247 acres) and river estuaries.

Eyguians (Vivaro-Alpine: Aiguians) is a former commune in the Hautes-Alpes department in southeastern France. On 1 January 2016, it was merged into the new commune Garde-Colombe.

== See also ==
- Communes of the Hautes-Alpes department
