= Sant Ildefons station =

Metro station in Barcelona, Spain

Coordinates: 41°21′48″N 2°05′03″E

- Platforms

Sant Ildefons (Catalan pronunciation: [ˌsant ildəˈfons]) is a station on line 5 of the Barcelona Metro.

The station is located underneath Avinguda República Argentina, between Plaça Sant Ildefons and Carrer Camèlia, in Cornellà de Llobregat. It was opened in 1976 and served as the terminus of line 5 until the extension to Cornellà Centre in 1983.

The side-platform station has a single ticket hall with two accesses.

== Services ==
Preceding station	Metro	Following station
Gavarra towards Cornellà Centre	L5	Can Boixeres towards Vall d'Hebron
