= Coteaux du Blanzacais =

- Commune
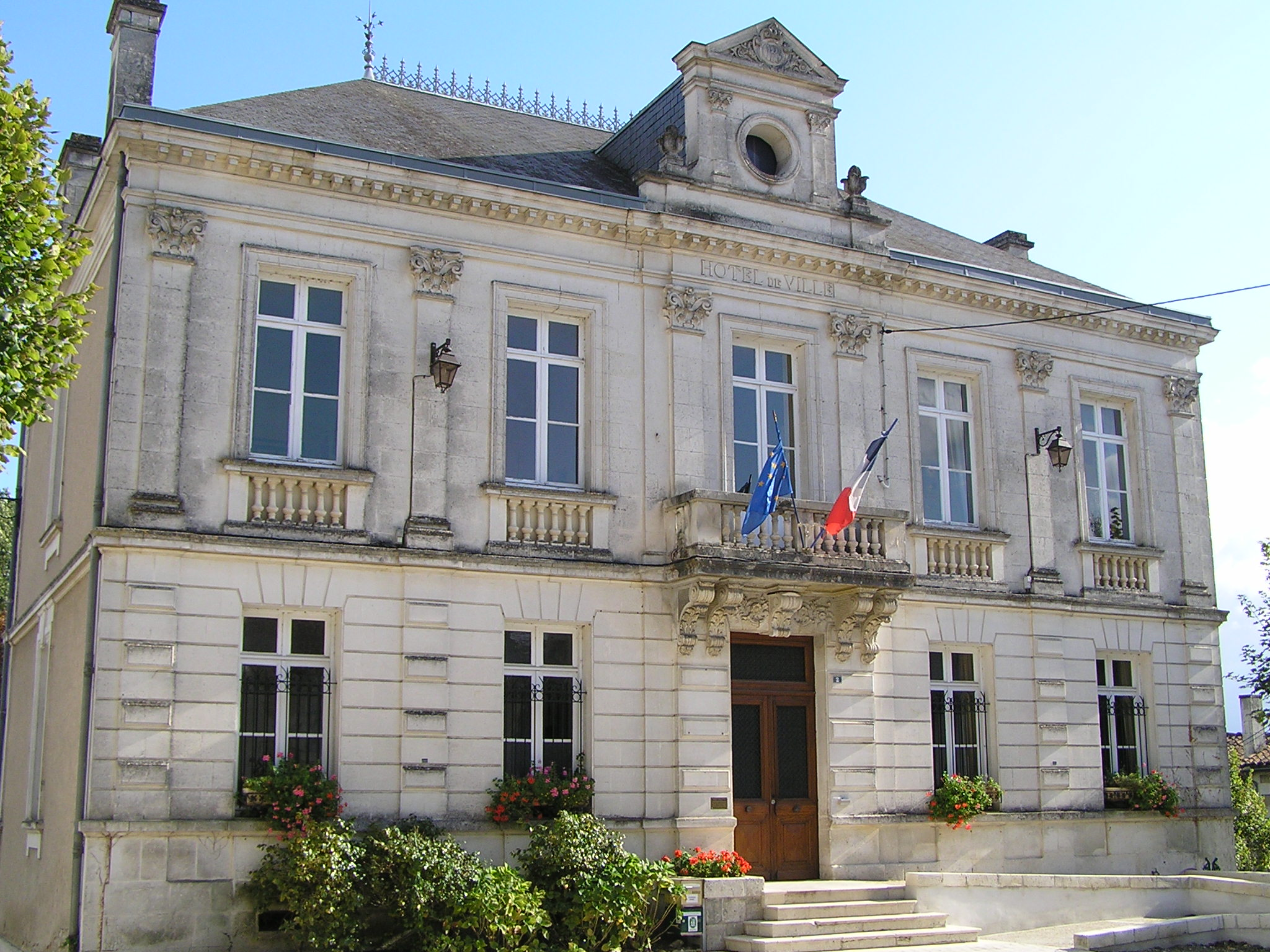
- The town hall in Coteaux du Blanzacais
- Location of Coteaux du Blanzacais
- Location within France Location within Nouvelle-Aquitaine
- Coordinates: 45°28′37″N 0°01′59″E
- Country: France
- Region: Nouvelle-Aquitaine
- Department: Charente
- Arrondissement: Cognac
- Canton: Charente-Sud
- Intercommunality: 4B - Sud-Charente

Government
  - Mayor (2020–2026): Jean-Philippe Sallee
- Area^{1}: 23.83 km^{2} (9.20 sq mi)
- Population (2023): 1,013
  - Density: 42.51/km^{2} (110.1/sq mi)
- Time zone: UTC+01:00 (CET)
  - Summer (DST): UTC+02:00 (CEST)
- INSEE/Postal code: 16046 /16250
- ^{1} French Land Register data, which excludes lakes, ponds, glaciers > 1 km^{2} (0.386 sq mi or 247 acres) and river estuaries.

Coteaux du Blanzacais (French pronunciation: [kɔto dy blɑ̃zakɛ]) is a commune in the department of Charente, southwestern France. The municipality was established on 1 January 2017 by merger of the former communes of Blanzac-Porcheresse (the seat) and Cressac-Saint-Genis. On 1 January 2019, the former commune of Saint-Léger was merged into Coteaux du Blanzacais.

== See also ==
- Communes of the Charente department
