= Cressac-Saint-Genis =

- Part of Coteaux du Blanzacais
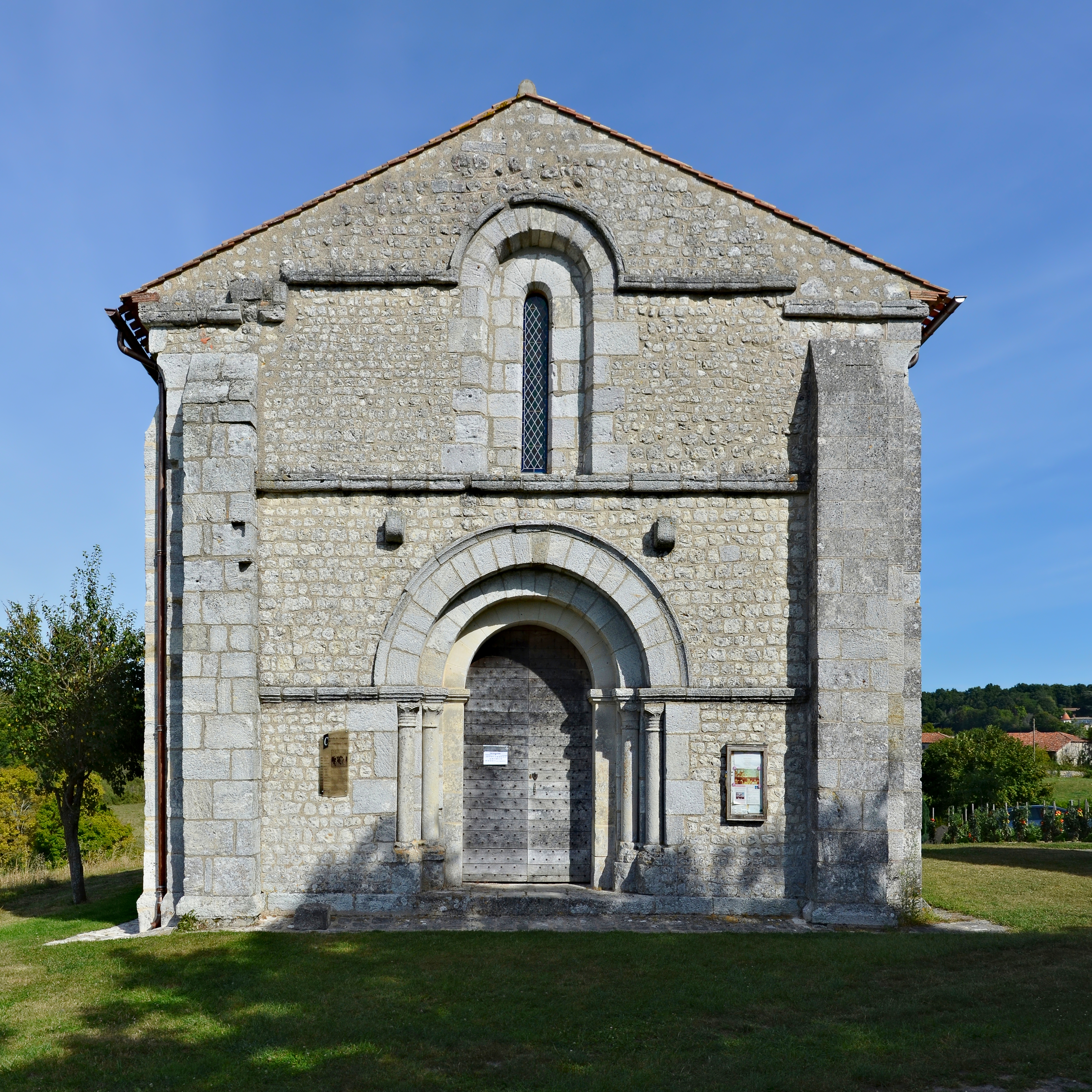
- Location of Cressac-Saint-Genis
- Location within France Location within Nouvelle-Aquitaine
- Coordinates: 45°26′50″N 0°00′46″E
- Country: France
- Region: Nouvelle-Aquitaine
- Department: Charente
- Arrondissement: Cognac
- Canton: Charente-Sud
- Commune: Coteaux du Blanzacais
- Area^{1}: 8.78 km^{2} (3.39 sq mi)
- Elevation: 87 m (285 ft)
- Highest elevation: 173 m (568 ft)
- Lowest elevation: 69 m (226 ft)
- Population (2018): 157
  - Density: 17.9/km^{2} (46.3/sq mi)
- Time zone: UTC+01:00 (CET)
  - Summer (DST): UTC+02:00 (CEST)
- Postal code: 16250
- ^{1} French Land Register data, which excludes lakes, ponds, glaciers > 1 km^{2} (0.386 sq mi or 247 acres) and river estuaries.

Cressac-Saint-Genis (French pronunciation: [kʁɛsak sɛ̃ ʒəni]) is a former commune in the Charente department in southwestern France. It was created in 1973 by the merger of two former communes: Cressac and Saint-Genis-de-Blanzac. On 1 January 2017, it was merged into the new commune Coteaux du Blanzacais.

== Population ==
The population data given in the table and graph below for 1968 and earlier refer to the former commune of Cressac.

Historical population

Year	Pop.	±% p.a.
1793	227	—
1821	237	+0.15%
1846	267	+0.48%
1872	211	−0.90%
1901	186	−0.43%
1946	147	−0.52%
1962	117	−1.42%

Year	Pop.	±% p.a.
1968	127	+1.38%
1975	162	+3.54%
1982	150	−1.09%
1990	128	−1.96%
1999	125	−0.26%
2018	157	+1.21%

Source: EHESS and INSEE (2018)

== See also ==
- Communes of the Charente department
