= Sant Genís de Bellera =

Benedictine monastery in Senterada, Spain

Coordinates: 42.359989°N 0.922656°E

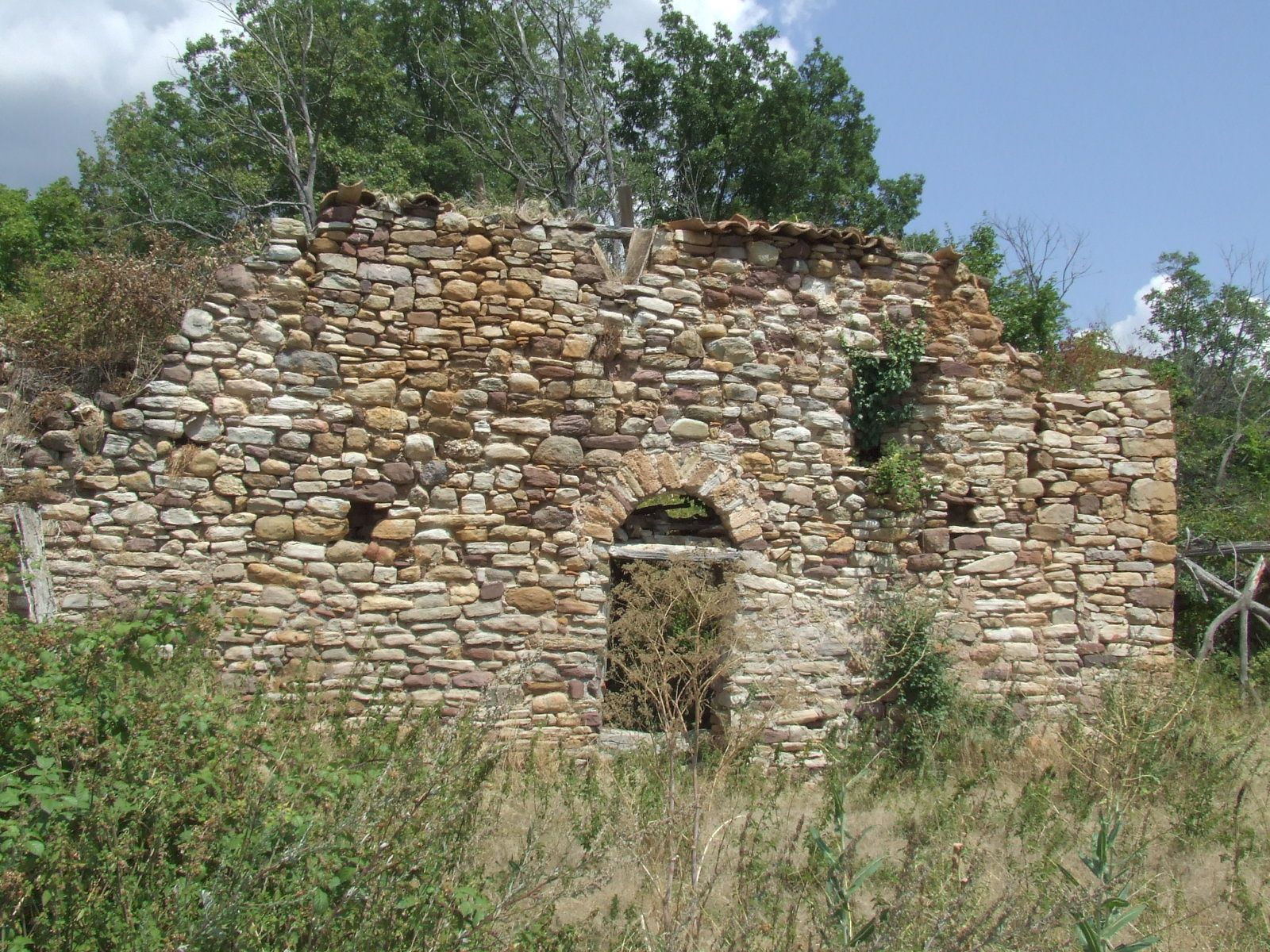
Sant Genís de Bellera

San Genís de Bellera is a ruined Benedictine monastery in Senterada, Pallars Jussà, Catalonia, Spain.

== History ==
It was founded by abbot Vulgarà in the mid-9th century. The monastery was protected by donations from the counts of Pallars, despite which in the 11th-12th centuries, it began to decline.
