= Moro Isaac Jenesio =

South Sudanese politician

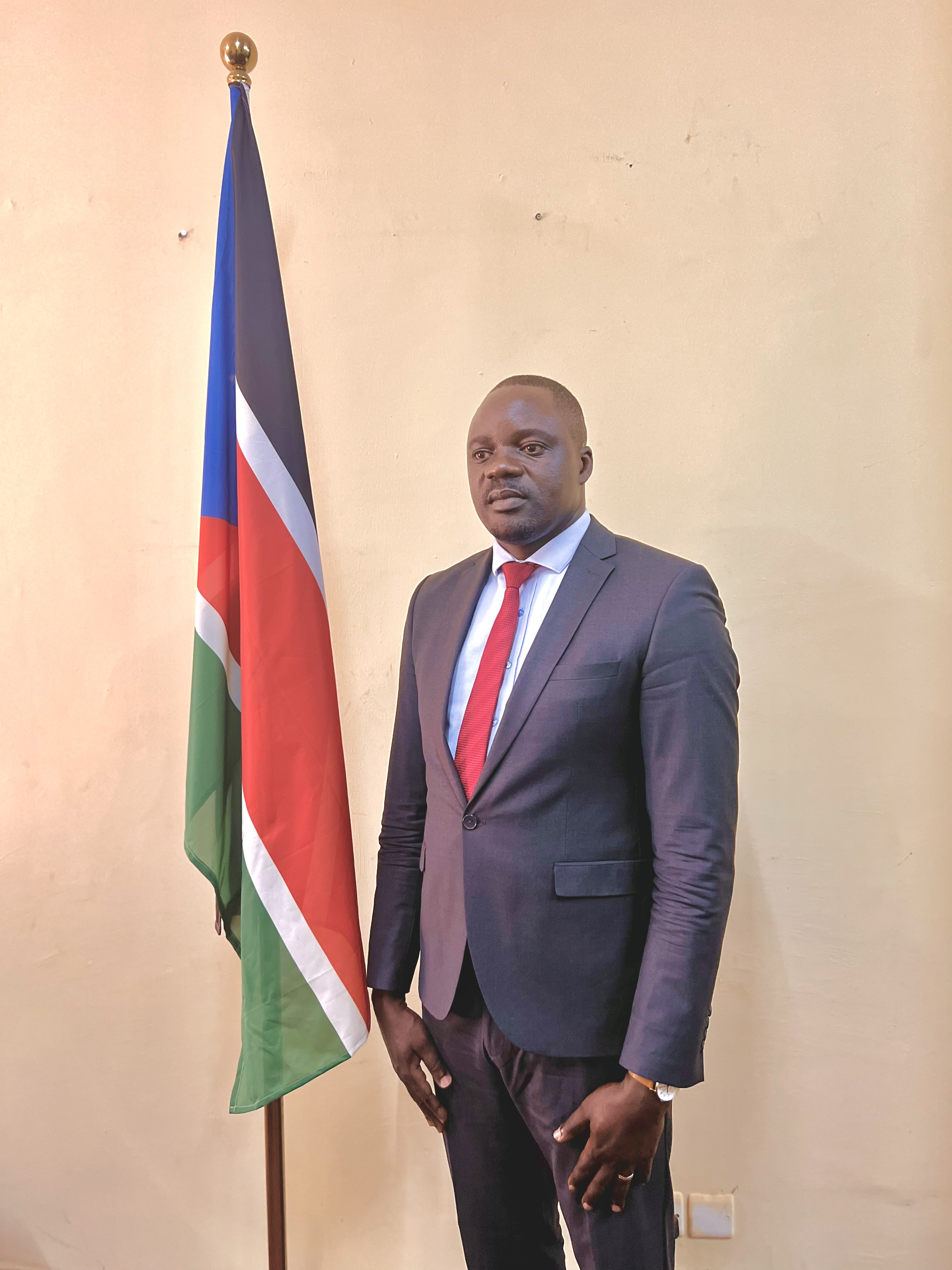
A portrait of Moro Isaac Jenesio. Photo: Woja Emmanuel

Moro Isaac Jenesio (born 1985) is one of the Youthful Leaders of South Sudan. Moro is the former Minister of Local Government and Law Enforcement for Central Equatoria State in the Transitional Government of National Unity. He is also the Chairperson of the South Sudan National Movement for Change (SSNMC), a constituent Member of South Sudan Opposition Alliance (SSOA) which is one of the leading Partners to RARCSS 2018 South Sudan.

== Early life and education ==
Moro Jenesio was born in Bori Boma of Kupera Payam of current Lainya County (in the former Yei District) of Central Equatoria State to Mr. Jenesio Guya Yasona Wani Lemi and Mrs. Janet Yensuk Mose Ware.

He started his education in 1988 in Bori Primary School in the then Southern Sudan, now Republic of South Sudan. In 1993 when the SPLA war intensified, Young Moro was taken to Uganda and enrolled in Siripi Primary School at Rhino Refugee Camp in Arua District of Uganda where he completed Primary Leaving Education (PLE) in 1999. He then joined Yole Polytechnic Institute in 2000 to 2003 where he completed Uganda Certificate of Education (UCE). with great UCE result, In 2004, Moro enrolled at St. Charles Lwanga College Koboko under a scholarship program (Hugh Pilkington) and graduated with Uganda Advanced Certificate of Education in 2005.

In 2012, he joined Makerere Biztech College in Kampala; a vocational Institute and obtained Diploma in Logistics and Supply Chain Management. He later joined Cavendish University Uganda and graduated with Bachelors of Laws (LLB) in 2017. Moro is also a Masters graduate in Public Administration and Management (MPAM) from Ndejje University of Uganda. He holds Master of Laws [LLM GENERAL] from the University of East London. He is currently pursuing Masters of Political Science in the University of Juba as of 2023

== Career ==
From 2012, Moro served as Senior Investigator at the Central Equatoria State anti-corruption commission probing and examining corruption cases and tracking budget implementation and adherence.

In 2014 he was promoted as Head of Corruption Prevention and Education at the commission to carry out corruption prevention and education awareness, a position he held up to 2016.

From 2013 to 2015 he also served as the Chairperson of National Youth Policy Development Committee.

From 2014 to 2016 he served as chairperson of Central Equatoria State Youth Organization.

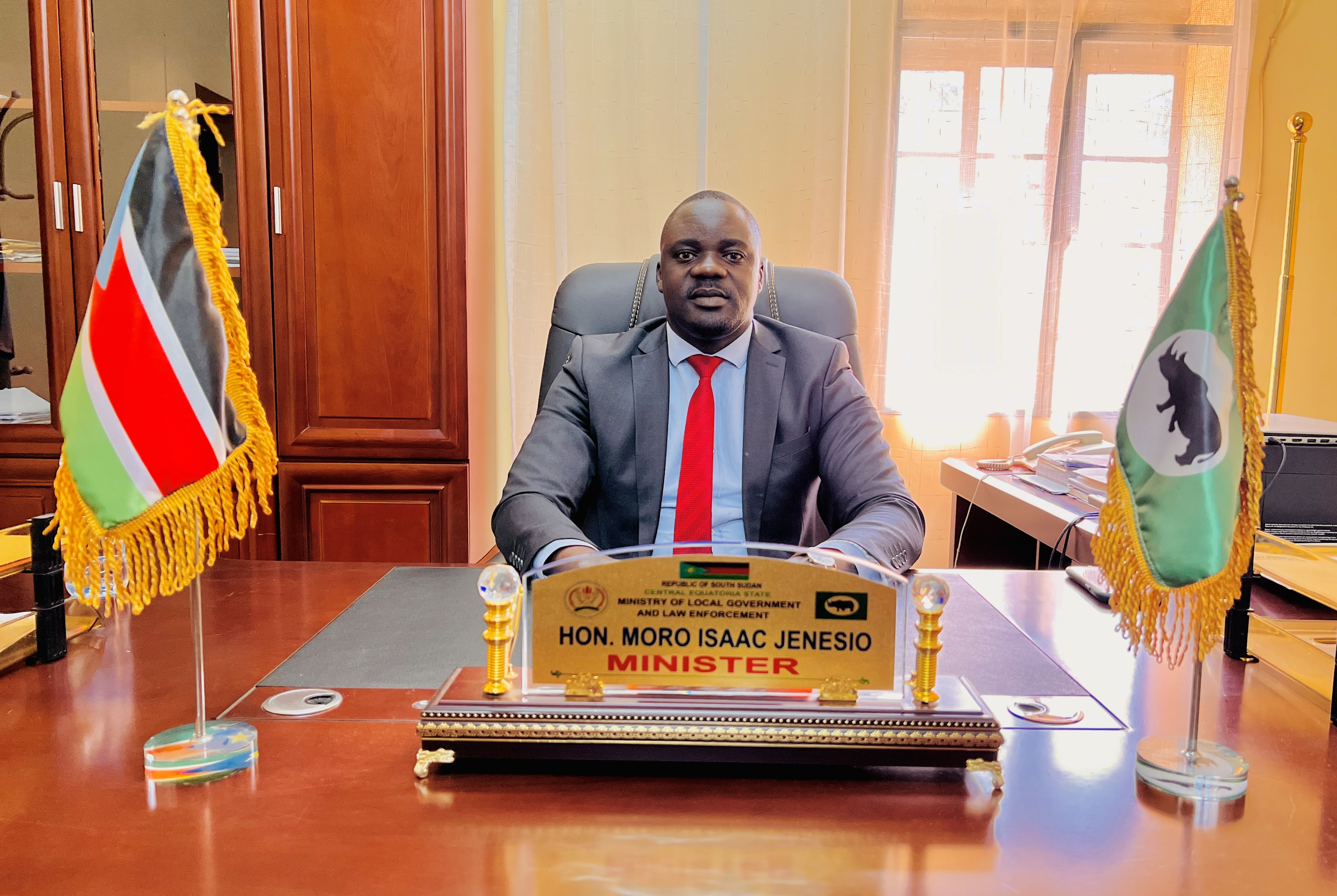
Moro Isaac Jenesio in his office

In 2016, Moro was appointed as an Advisor for Governance, Peace and Conflict Resolution to Governor Lokonga of Yei River State, a position he declined to take oath for. However, together with the Former Governor of Western Equatoria State Bangasi Joseph Bakosoro and others, initiated and founded the South Sudan National Movement for Change by 5 January 2017. SSNMC became one of the founding Members of the South Sudan Opposition Alliance, signatory to the Revitalized peace agreement and he was appointed the movement's Uganda Chapter Chairperson and later Secretary General.

However, when the leader of South Sudan National Movement for Change, Bangasi Joseph Bakasoro relinquished his position and rejoined the SPLM, Moro was then elected as its new chairperson during SSNMC Convention.

From 2018 to 2021 Moro also served as Member and head of Secretariat of the Joint Military Ceasefire Commission (JMCC) a body tasked with responsibility to canton, register train and unify all armed forces in South Sudan.

== Peace role ==
Moro Isaac Jenesio was part and parcel of the Revitalized Agreement on the Resolution of the Conflict in the Republic of South Sudan which ended the half a decade conflicts in South Sudan.

== Achievements ==
Moro steered the assembly, cantonment, registration and screening of all unified forces in South Sudan.

In June 2023, Moro initiated the first-ever capacity-building training of local government officers in the Transitional Government of National Unity.
