= Saint Genesius =

Saint Genesius may refer to:

- Genesius of Arles, martyred under Maximianus in 303 or 308
- Genesius, Bishop of Clermont (died circa 662), French saint and bishop
- Genesius, Count of Clermont (died 725), noble of Gaul and reputed miracle worker
- Genesius of Lyon (died 679), 37th Archbishop of Lyon
- Genesius of Rome, comedian and patron saint of actors
- Ginés de la Jara, aka Genesius Sciarensis

== See also ==
- Saint-Genis (disambiguation)
- Sant Genís (disambiguation)
- San Genesio (disambiguation)
- San Ginesio
