= Saint-Genis, Hautes-Alpes =

Saint-Genis
- Part of Garde-Colombe
- Location of Saint-Genis
- Location within France Location within Provence-Alpes-Côte d'Azur
- Coordinates: 44°22′49″N 5°46′09″E
- Country: France
- Region: Provence-Alpes-Côte d'Azur
- Department: Hautes-Alpes
- Arrondissement: Gap
- Canton: Serres
- Commune: Garde-Colombe
- Area^{1}: 18.32 km^{2} (7.07 sq mi)
- Elevation: 621 m (2,037 ft)
- Highest elevation: 1,422 m (4,665 ft)
- Lowest elevation: 591 m (1,939 ft)
- Population (2019): 53
  - Density: 2.9/km^{2} (7.5/sq mi)
- Time zone: UTC+01:00 (CET)
  - Summer (DST): UTC+02:00 (CEST)
- Postal code: 05300
- ^{1} French Land Register data, which excludes lakes, ponds, glaciers > 1 km^{2} (0.386 sq mi or 247 acres) and river estuaries.

Saint-Genis (Vivaro-Alpine: Sant Genís) is a former commune in the Hautes-Alpes department in southeastern France. On 1 January 2016, it was merged into the new commune Garde-Colombe.

== See also ==
- Communes of the Hautes-Alpes department
