= Cornellà Centre station =

Metro station in Catalonia, Spain

Cornellà Centre
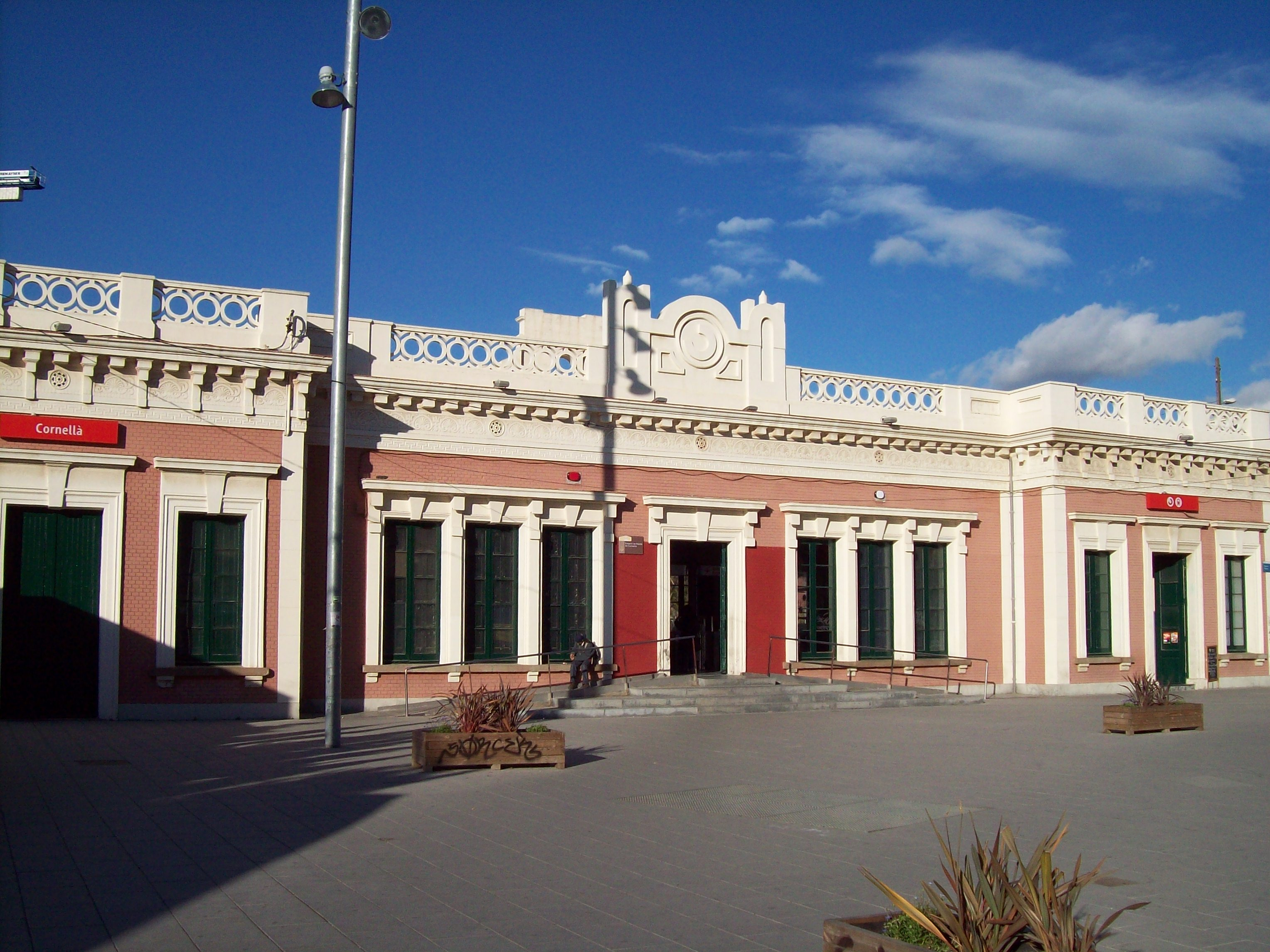
- Cornellà Train Station

General information
- Location: Carrer Ernest Lluch; 08907 Cornellà de Llobregat; Catalonia; Spain
- Coordinates: 41.3574°N 2.0700°E
- System: Rodalies de Catalunya commuter station Barcelona Metro station
- Owner: Adif
- Operator: Renfe Operadora
- Lines: Sant Vicenç de Calders–Vilafranca–Barcelona (PK 68.2); Barcelona Metro line 5
- Platforms: 6 side platforms
- Tracks: 6

Construction
- Structure type: At-grade
- Parking: A parking lot is located at each side of the station.

Other information
- Fare zone: 1 (ATM Àrea de Barcelona and Rodalies de Catalunya's Barcelona commuter rail service)

Services
Preceding station	Rodalies de Catalunya	Following station
Sant Joan Despí towards Molins de Rei	R1	L'Hospitalet de Llobregat towards Maçanet-Massanes
Sant Joan Despí towards Sant Vicenç de Calders	R4	L'Hospitalet de Llobregat towards Manresa
Preceding station	Metro	Following station
Terminus	L5	Gavarra towards Vall d'Hebron
Location

Cornellà Centre (Catalan pronunciation: [kurnəˈʎa ˈsentɾə]), also simply known as Cornellà, is a Rodalies de Catalunya and Barcelona Metro station, as well as Trambaix tram stop. It is located in the city centre of the Cornellà de Llobregat municipality, to the south-west of Barcelona, in Catalonia, Spain.

It has been the southern terminus of Barcelona Metro line 5 since 1983, when it was opened. The Rodalies de Catalunya station is served by Barcelona commuter rail service lines R1 and R4. On the other hand, the Trambaix stop is served by routes T1 and T2.

The original name of the Barcelona Metro station was simply "Cornellà", but it was renamed "Cornellà Centre" because Gavarra and Sant Ildefons stations, all of them on Barcelona Metro line 5, are also located in the Cornellà de Llobregat municipality.
