= Vall d'Hebron station =

Metro station in Barcelona, Spain

Vall d'Hebron
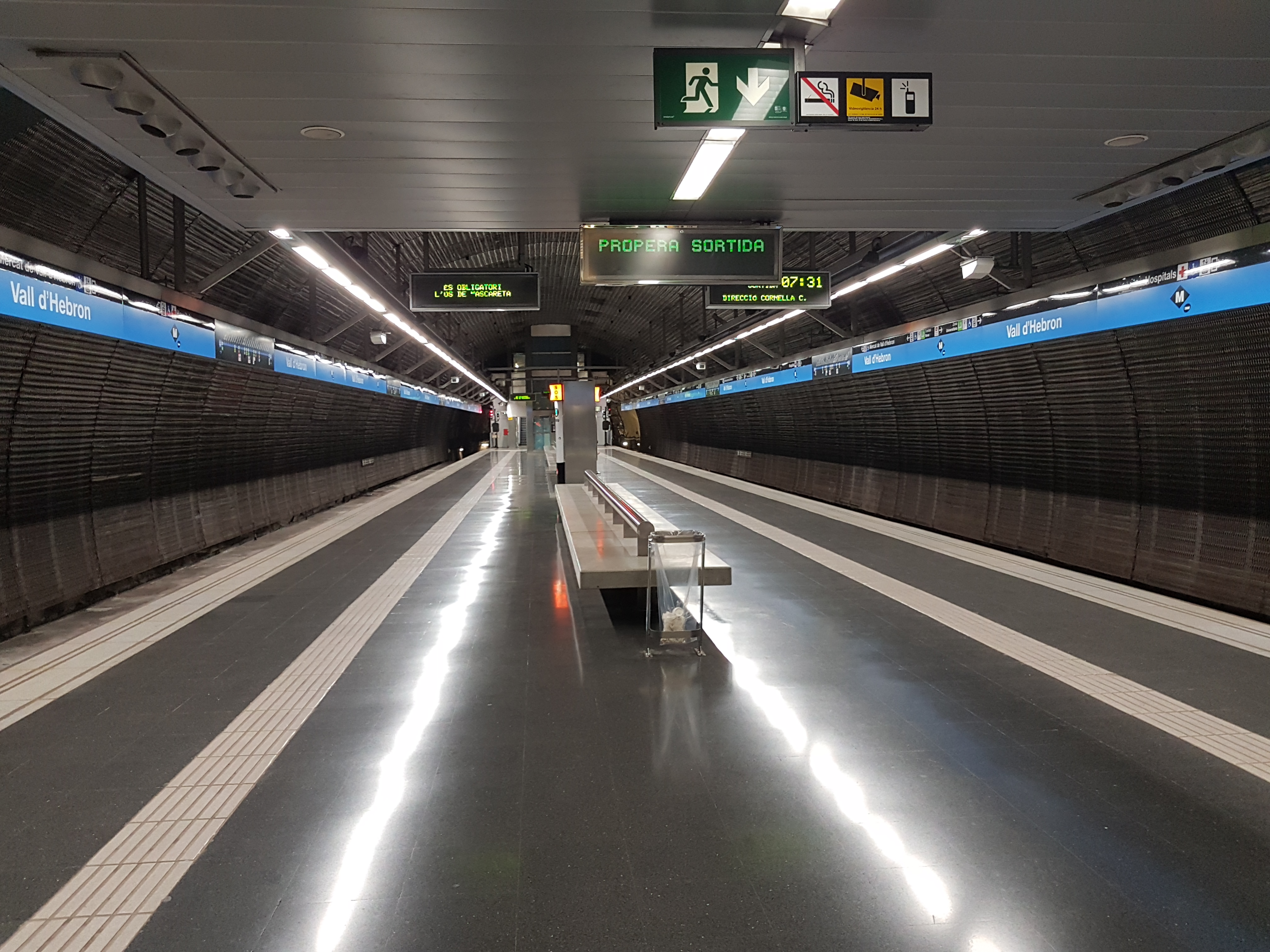
- Station platforms

General information
- Location: Barcelona (Horta-Guinardó)
- Coordinates: 41°25′29″N 2°8′30″E
- System: Barcelona Metro rapid transit station
- Owner: Transports Metropolitans de Barcelona
- Platforms: 2 side platforms (L3); 1 centre platform (L5)
- Tracks: 4

Construction
- Structure type: Underground

Other information
- Fare zone: 1 (ATM)

History
- Opened: 1985

Services
| Preceding station | Metro | Following station |
|---|---|---|
| Penitents towards Zona Universitària | L3 | Montbau towards Trinitat Nova |
| El Coll | La Teixonera towards Cornellà Centre | L5 | Terminus |
Location
- Location within Barcelona Location within Spain

Vall d'Hebron | Sant Genís (Catalan pronunciation: [ˈbaʎ dəˈβɾon]) is a Barcelona Metro station, in the Horta-Guinardó district of Barcelona, and named after the nearby Vall d'Hebron neighbourhood. The station is served by line L3 and is the northern terminus of line L5.

The line L3 section of the station is situated under the Passeig de la Vall d'Hebron and the Ronda de Dalt expressway, between Avinguda del Jordà and Camí de la Granja. It has two tracks and two side platforms that are 95 metres (312 ft) long. The line L5 section of the station is situated at a depth of 41.5 metres (136 ft) below the Avinguda del Jordà and the Carrer de Coll i Alentorn. It has a single central island platform served by two tracks.

Vall d'Hebron | Sant Genis is one of three stations where lines L3 and L5 connect, the others being Sants Estació and Diagonal metro stations. Like both these two stations, the platforms of the two lines at Vall d'Hebron are connected by an underground passageway. However, there is no track connection between the two lines at Vall d'Hebron. There are depots for both lines adjacent to the station.

The station was opened in 1985, when the section of line L3 between Lesseps and Montbau stations was inaugurated. The line L5 section of the station was opened on 30 July 2010, when the extension from Horta station opened.
