= Tarragona railway station =

Railway station in Spain

Tarragona
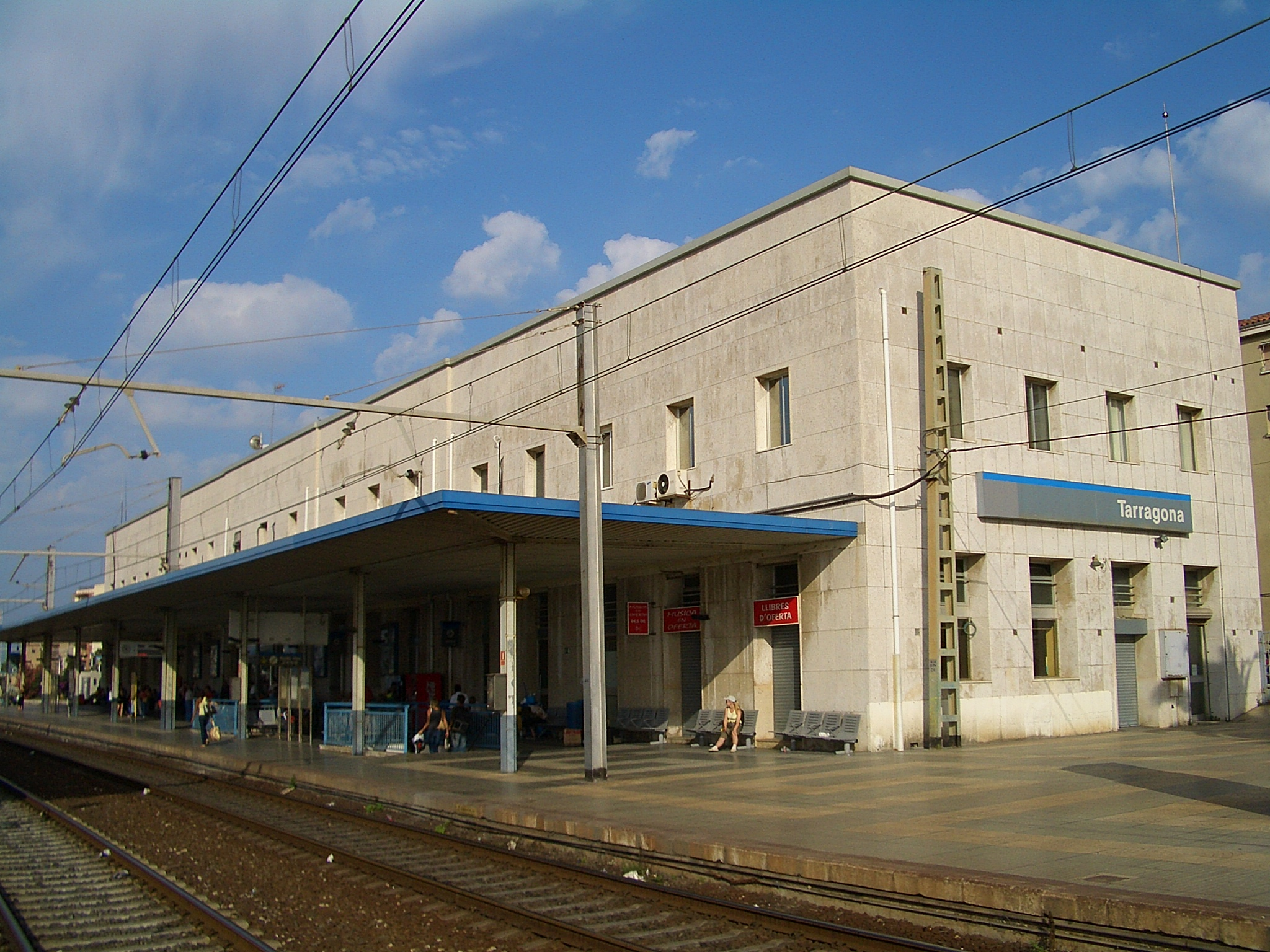
- Platforms of the station in 2007.

General information
- Owner: Adif
- Operator: Renfe
- Lines: Valencia–Sant Vicenç de Calders railway Tarragona–Lleida railway

History
- Opened: 1865
Location

Tarragona railway station is the central railway station of Tarragona, Spain. The station is situated on the Valencia–Sant Vicenç de Calders railway and is part of Adif and it accommodates Renfe conventional and Rodalies de Catalunya medium-distance trains.

Opened in 1856, Tarragona station has an uncertain future due to the arrival of the Madrid–Barcelona high-speed rail line at a new station called Camp de Tarragona, as well as the opening of an upgraded section of the Valencia–Sant Vicenç de Calders railway bypassing the city of Tarragona. Officially called a "provisional station", it is actually 10 kilometers from the centre of Tarragona, with all long-distance services being rerouted by the upgraded and high-speed lines, calling at Camp de Tarragona station instead.

Preceding station	Renfe Operadora	Following station
Cambrils towards Valencia Nord	Intercity	Barcelona Sants Terminus
Reus towards Zaragoza–Delicias	Media Distancia 34	Sant Vicenç de Calders towards Barcelona Estació de França
Preceding station	Rodalies de Catalunya	Following station
Vila-seca towards Lleida Pirineus	R14	Altafulla-Tamarit towards Barcelona Estació de França
Vila-seca towards Riba-roja d'Ebre	R15	Altafulla-Tamarit towards Barcelona Estació de França
Vila-seca towards Ulldecona-Alcanar-La Sénia or Tortosa	R16	Altafulla-Tamarit towards Barcelona Estació de França
Port Aventura Terminus	R17	Altafulla-Tamarit towards Barcelona Estació de França
Vila-seca towards Reus	RT1	Terminus
Port Aventura Terminus	RT2	Altafulla-Tamarit towards L'Arboç
