= R17 (Rodalies de Catalunya) =

Overview
- Service type: Regional rail
- Status: Operational
- Locale: Barcelona and Tarragona provinces
- First service: 13 January 2020
- Current operator: Renfe Operadora

Route
- Termini: Port Aventura; Barcelona Estació de França
- Stops: 9
- Distance travelled: 102 km (63 mi)
- Average journey time: 11 min–1 h 51 min
- Service frequency: Thrice daily
- Lines used: Valencia–Sant Vicenç de Calders; Madrid–Barcelona

Technical
- Rolling stock: 448 Series and 470 Series EMUs
- Track gauge: 1,668 mm (5 ft 5 21/32 in) Iberian gauge
- Electrification: 3,000 V DC overhead lines
- Track owner: Adif

The R17 is a line of Rodalies de Catalunya's regional rail service, operated by Renfe Operadora. It runs southwards from the Barcelona area to Port Aventura, near the seaside resort of Salou, passing through the Vallès Occidental, Baix Llobregat, Garraf, Baix Penedès, Camp de Tarragona, Baix Ebre and Montsià regions. R17 trains run primarily on the Valencia–Sant Vicenç de Calders and Madrid–Barcelona railway, using Port Aventura as their southernmost terminus, and Barcelona Estació de França as its northern one. They use the Aragó Tunnel in Barcelona, where they share tracks with Rodalies de Catalunya's Barcelona suburban lines R2, R2 Nord and R2 Sud and regional rail lines R11, R13, R14, R15 and R16, calling at Sants and Passeig de Gràcia stations, while they continue to share tracks with Barcelona commuter rail service R2 Sud as far as Sant Vicenç de Calders, and with the Tarragona commuter rail service RT2 from Sant Vicenç de Calders to Port Aventura.

R17 trains started operating on 13 January 2020 after the closure of a segment of the Valencia–Sant Vicenç de Calders railway and the opening of an alternative route bypassing that segment, affecting trains running through that segment. The R16, which had previously run on that segment between Tarragona and L'Ampolla-Perelló-Deltebre, was rerouted via the new bypass. The newly created R17 took over the former segment of line R16 between Tarragona and Port Aventura stations, where the old line stops operating.

== List of stations ==
The following table lists the name of each station served by line R17 in order from south to north; the station's service pattern offered by R17 trains; the transfers to other Rodalies de Catalunya lines, including both commuter and regional rail services; remarkable transfers to other transport systems; the municipality in which each station is located; and the fare zone each station belongs to according to the Autoritat del Transport Metropolità (ATM Àrea de Barcelona) fare-integrated public transport system and Rodalies de Catalunya's own fare zone system for Barcelona commuter rail service lines.

#	Terminal of a service
*	Transfer station to other transport systems
#*	Transfer station and terminal
●	Station served by all trains running through it
○	Limited service station

Station	Service	Rodalies de Catalunya transfers	Other transfers	Municipality	Fare zone		
Station	Service	Rodalies de Catalunya transfers	Other transfers	Municipality	ATM AdT	ATM AdB	Rod
Port Aventura#	●	RT2	—	Salou	1	—	—
Tarragona*	●	R14, R15, R16, RT1, RT2	Renfe Operadora-operated long-distance rail services	Tarragona	1	—	—
Altafulla-Tamarit	●	R14, R15, R16, RT2	—	Altafulla	1	—	—
Torredembarra	●	R14, R15, R16, RT2	—	Torredembarra	1	—	—
Sant Vicenç de Calders	●	R2 Sud, R4, R13, R14, R15, R16, RT2	—	El Vendrell	2, 4	6A	6
Vilanova i la Geltrú	●	R2 Sud, R13, R14, R15, R16	—	Vilanova i la Geltrú	—	4A	4
Barcelona Sants*	●	R1, R2, R2 Nord, R2 Sud, R3, R4, R11, R12, R13, R14, R15, R16, RG1	Renfe Operadora-operated high-speed and long-distance rail services TGV high-speed rail services Barcelona Metro lines 3 and 5 at Sants Estació station National and international coach services	Barcelona	—	1	1
Barcelona Passeig de Gràcia*	●	R2, R2 Nord, R2 Sud, R11, R13, R14, R15, R16	Barcelona Metro lines 2, 3 and 4	Barcelona	—	1	1
Barcelona Estació de França#*	●	R2 Sud, R13, R14, R15, R16	Renfe Operadora-operated long-distance rail services Barcelona Metro line 4 at Barceloneta station	Barcelona	—	1	1
