= Sant Vicenç de Calders railway station =

Railway station in El Vendrell, Catalonia Spain

Sant Vicenç de Calders Station
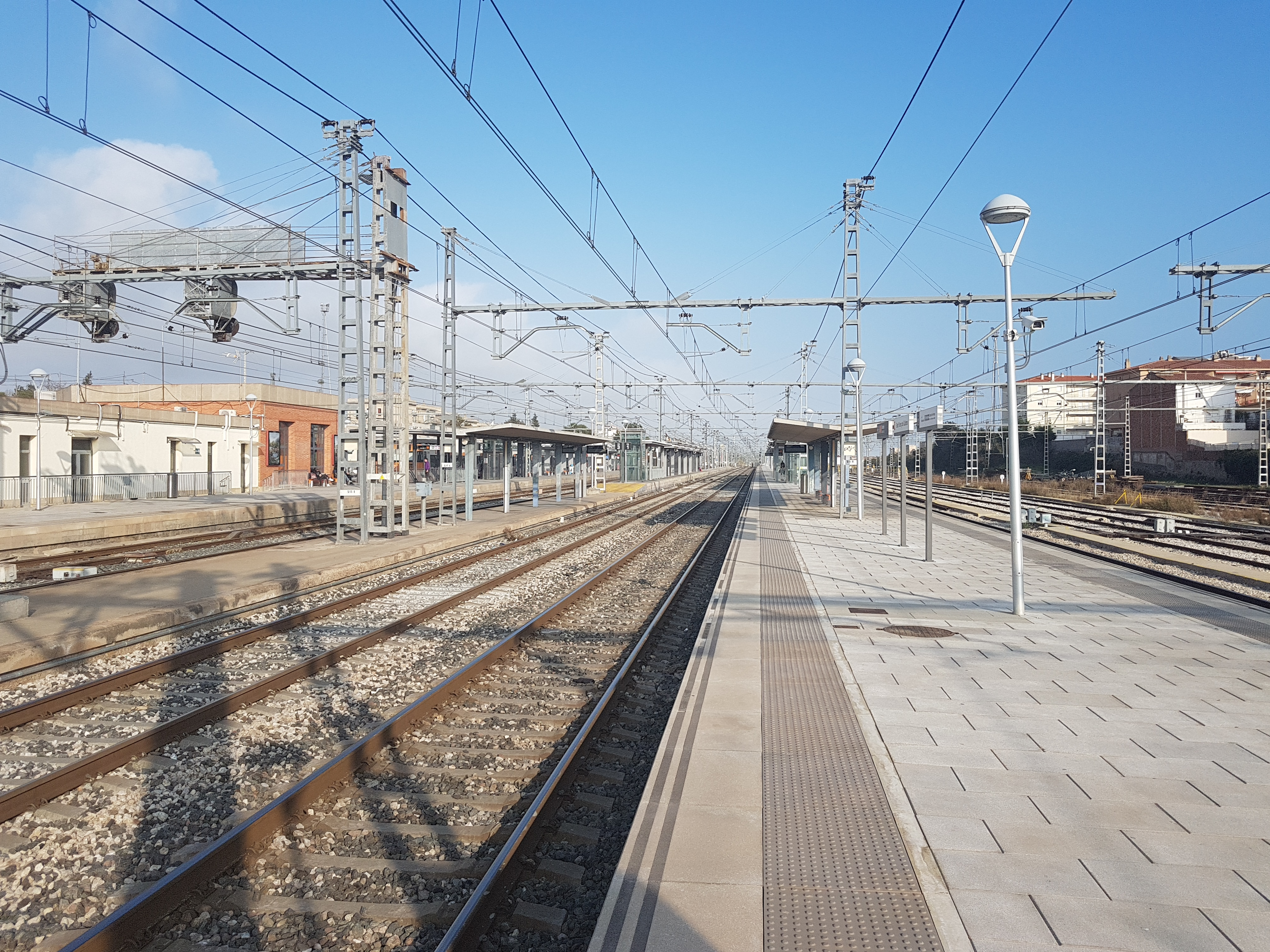
- Sant Vicenç de Calders Station.

General information
- Location: El Vendrell, (Baix Penedès), Catalonia; Spain
- Coordinates: 41.18603°N 1.52581°E
- System: Rodalies de Catalunya commuter and regional rail station
- Owner: Adif
- Operator: Renfe Operadora

History
- Opened: 1887
Location

Sant Vicenç de Calders is a railway station owned by Adif located in the municipality of Vendrell in the region of Baix Penedès, in the neighborhood of l'Estació in Sant Vicenç de Calders. The station is located at the junction of the lines from Barcelona-Vilafranca-Tarragona and Barcelona-Vilanova-Valls, where trains from the Barcelona suburban lines R2 and R4, the RT2 line and the regional lines R13, R14, R15, R16, and R17 of Rodalies de Catalunya, as well as Medium Distance lines, all operated by Renfe Operadora, circulate.

== History ==
This station on the Vilafranca line and the Vilanova line entered service on April 24, 1887, when a connecting station was built between these two lines owned by the Companyia dels Ferrocarrils de Tarragona a Barcelona i França (TBF), although trains have been running in this area since 1865 when the section between Martorell and Tarragona (Barcelona-Martorell-Vilafranca-Tarragona line) was opened. The connection and construction of the station are the result of the works aimed at joining different lines owned by TBF after the absorption of the company Companyia dels Ferrocarrils de Valls a Vilanova i Barcelona (VVB), which had built the Barcelona-Vilanova-Valls line and had opened the section Calafell-Valls in 1883.

Initially, the two railway lines crossed each other via an overpass, one above the other, located very close to the actual station. The station was built in an isolated area, surrounded by fields and marshes, about three kilometers from the urban center of Sant Vicenç de Calders, a village situated atop a hill, which was then an independent municipality of Vendrell. It was situated between the tracks, three on the mountain side and three on the sea side. The connection of the two tracks and the construction of the passenger and service station building were entrusted to the engineer Eduard Maristany i Gibert. The passenger building was a single-story structure with various dependencies. The lobby, restaurant, and baggage room occupied almost the entire space. From that moment until the 1920s, the houses of the Sant Vicenç de Calders Railway Colony were gradually built. Six pavilions and three buildings endure: those of the station master, the supervisor, and the block.

== Line ==
- Líne 200 (Madrid-Sant Vicenç de Calders-Barcelona)
- Líne 240 (Sant Vicenç de Calders-Hospitalet de Llobregat)
- Líne 600 (Sant Vicenç de Calders-València/Tortosa)

== Railway Services ==
It serves as the terminus for two lines, one heading towards Barcelona along the coast, the R2 Sud, and the other also heading to Barcelona but through Vilafranca del Penedès, the R4. In the case of the first line, currently, all trains have Estació de França as their destination until 2011 due to construction work in the Sant Andreu Comtal area.

Formerly, the station was named Sant Vicenç de Calders - Coma-ruga - el Vendrell, but due to the implementation of the term "Rodalia" in 1993, it was decided to shorten it to Sant Vicenç de Calders, even though it is located next to Coma-ruga.

Origin/Destination	Preceding station	Rodalies de Catalunya	Following station	Origin/Destination
Rodalia de Barcelona
terminal			Calafell	Estació de França ¹
terminal			El Vendrell	Terrassa Manresa
terminal			Calafell	Sant Andreu Comtal Granollers Centre
Rodalia del Camp de Tarragona
Port Aventura	Torredembarra		El Vendrell	L'Arboç
Serveis regionals de Rodalies de Catalunya
La Plana - Picamoixons Lleida Pirineus	Roda de Mar		terminal² Calafell Vilanova i la Geltrú Barcelona-Sants¹	Barcelona-Estació de França
Lleida Pirineus	Torredembarra		Calafell Vilanova i la Geltrú Barcelona-Sants¹	Barcelona-Estació de França
Reus Móra la Nova Flix Riba-roja d'Ebre	Torredembarra		Calafell Vilanova i la Geltrú Barcelona-Sants¹	Barcelona-Estació de França
Tortosa Vinaròs València-Nord	Torredembarra		Vilanova i la Geltrú Barcelona-Sants	Barcelona-Estació de França
Port Aventura	Torredembarra		Vilanova i la Geltrú Barcelona-Sants	Barcelona-Estació de França
Casp Zaragoza-Delicias Madrid-Chamartín	Torredembarra		Barcelona-Sants	Barcelona-Estació de França

Preceding station	Renfe Operadora	Following station
Tarragona towards Valencia Nord	Intercity	Barcelona Sants towards Barcelona Estació de França
Tarragona towards Zaragoza–Delicias	Media Distancia 34	Barcelona Sants towards Barcelona Estació de França
Preceding station	Rodalies de Catalunya	Following station
Terminus	R2 Sud	Calafell towards Barcelona Estació de França
Terminus	R4	Vendrell towards Manresa
Torredembarra towards Tarragona	RT2	Vendrell towards L'Arboç
Roda de Mar towards Lleida Pirineus	R13	Calafell Some Regional (R) trains only towards Barcelona Estació de França
Torredembarra Some trains only towards Lleida Pirineus	R14	Calafell Some Regional (R) trains only towards Barcelona Estació de França
Torredembarra Some trains only towards Riba-roja d'Ebre	R15	Calafell Some Regional (R) trains only towards Barcelona Estació de França
Torredembarra towards Ulldecona-Alcanar-La Sénia or Tortosa	R16	Vilanova i la Geltrú towards Barcelona Estació de França
Torredembarra towards Port Aventura	R17	Vilanova i la Geltrú towards Barcelona Estació de França

1. MD: Some regional trains do not stop at Vilanova i la Geltrú, being the next or previous stop Barcelona-Sants.
2. MD: Only for trains originating from or destined for La Plana - Picamoixons or Valls.
