= Reus railway station =

Railway station in Reus, Spain

Reus Station Estació de Reus
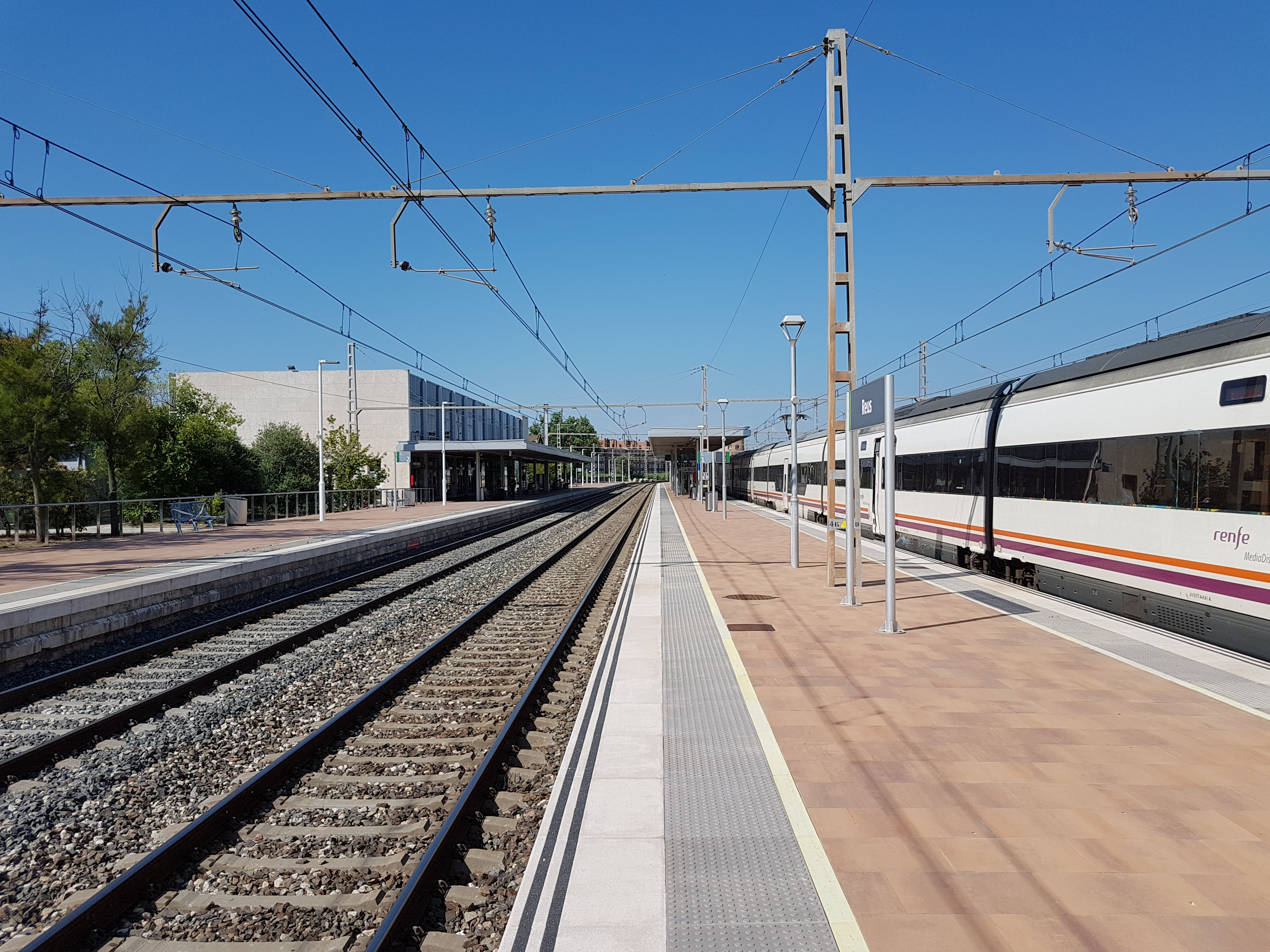
- Reus Station.

General information
- Location: Plaça de l'Estació; Reus, (Baix Camp), Catalonia; Spain
- Coordinates: 41.16069°N 1.09995°E
- System: Rodalies de Catalunya commuter and regional rail station
- Owner: Adif
- Operator: Renfe Operadora

History
- Opened: 1884
Location

Reus Station is a railway station owned by Adif located northwest of the town of Reus in the Catalan comarca of Baix Camp. The station is on the Tarragona-Reus-Lleida line and is served by regional lines RT1, R14, R15, and line Ca6 of Rodalies de Catalunya, operated by Renfe Operadora.

The first station at Reus entered service in 1856 when the section constructed by the Company of the Reus to Tarragona Railway (later LRT) between Tarragona and Reus entered service. In 1884, a second station was constructed at the present location. The building is an example of buildings that replaced originals with more functional constructions than the old stations.

== Line ==
- Line 200 (Madrid-Reus-Barcelona)
- Line 230 (Tarragona-Reus-Lleida)
- Line 234 (Roda de Berà-Reus)

== Railway services ==
Rodalies del Camp de Tarragona
Origin/Destination	Preceding station	Rodalies de Catalunya	Following station	Origin/Destination
terminal			Vila-Seca	Tarragona
Serveis regionals de Rodalies de Catalunya
Origin/Destination	Preceding station	Rodalies de Catalunya	Following station	Origin/Destination
Lleida Pirineus	La Selva del Camp		Vila-seca	Barcelona-Estació de França
terminal Móra la Nova Flix Riba-roja d'Ebre	Les Borges del Camp		Vila-seca	Barcelona-Estació de França
Casp Zaragoza-Delicias Madrid-Chamartín	Les Borges del Camp		Vila-seca	Barcelona-Estació de França

== Gallery ==
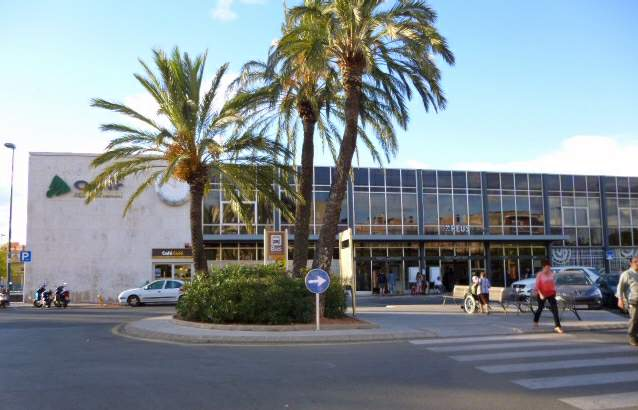
Building and entrance to station

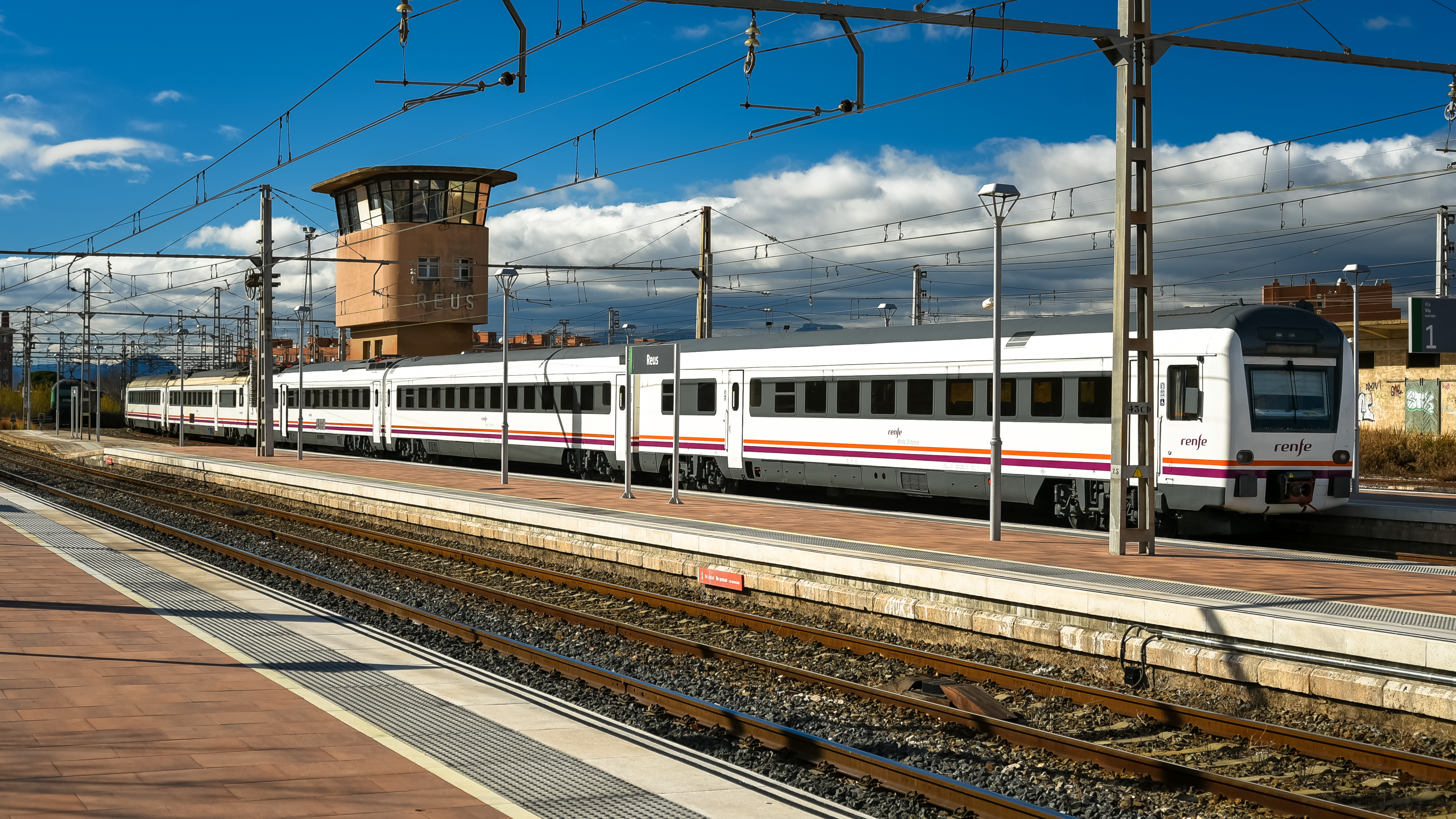
Reus station platform
