= Móra la Nova railway station =

Railway station in Móra la Nova, Spain

Móra la Nova station
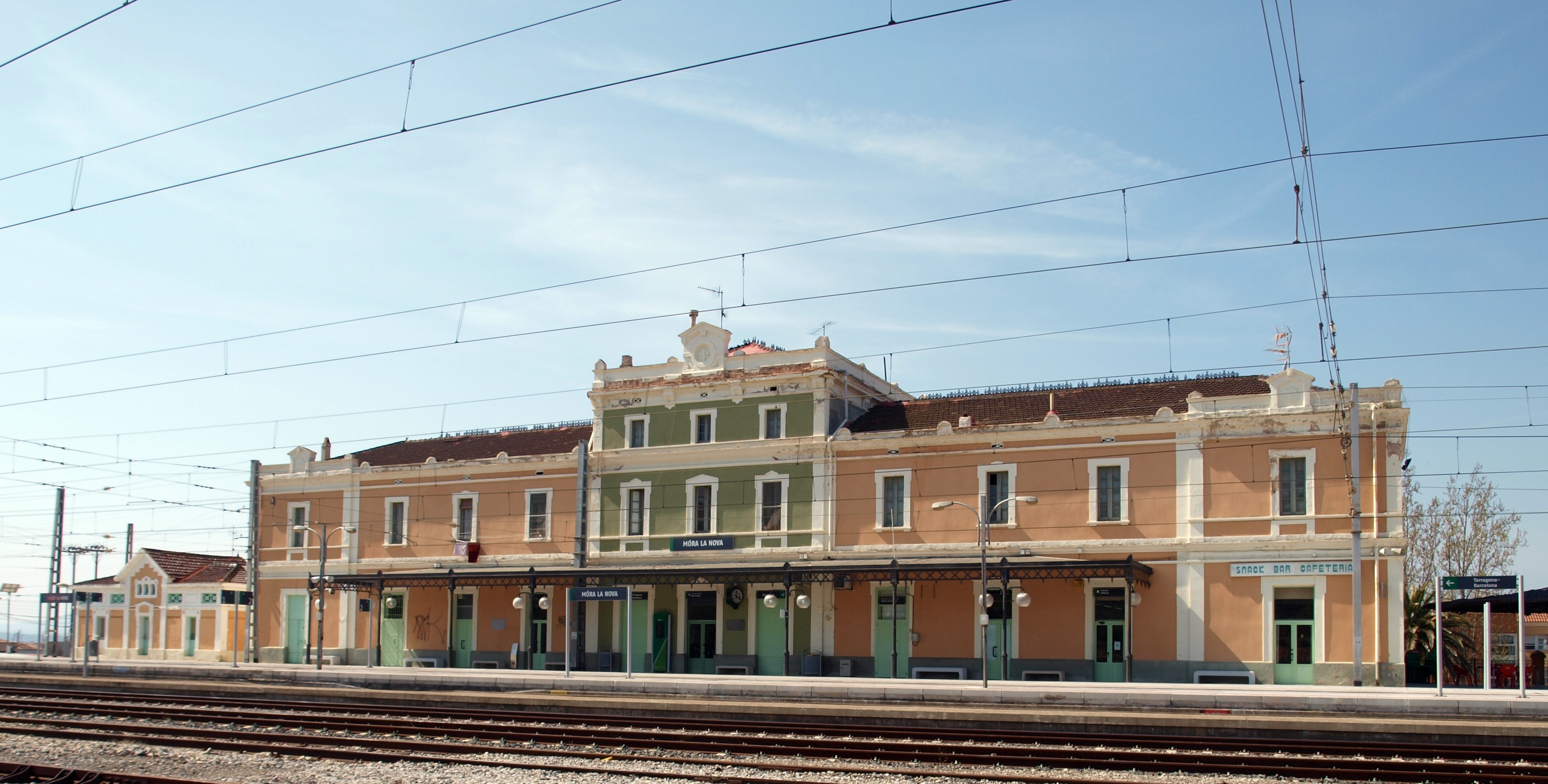
- Móra la Nova railway station

General information
- Location: Móra la Nova, (Ribera d'Ebre), Catalonia; Spain
- Coordinates: 41.10642°N 0.65342°E
- System: Rodalies de Catalunya commuter and regional rail station
- Owner: Adif
- Operator: Renfe Operadora

History
- Opened: 1891
Location

Móra la Nova station is a railway station owned by Adif located north of the town of Móra la Nova in the Catalan region of Ribera d'Ebre. The station serves regional trains on the R15 of Rodalies de Catalunya and the Ca6 line, both operated by Renfe Operadora.

This station, originally planned by the Companyia dels Ferrocarrils Directes, came into service in 1891 when the section built by the Companyia dels Ferrocarrils de Tarragona a Barcelona i França (TBF) between Marçà-Falset (1890) and Móra la Nova was opened. Although the building was initially conceived as provisional, structurally differing from others on the line, it has endured and is still preserved.

The Diputació de Tarragona and the Foundation for the Preservation of Railway Heritage Industrial (FPPFI) of Móra la Nova promoted improvement works at the station in 2008, including the installation of a turntable for track changing. In 2010, the Railway Interpretation Center (later Museum of the Railway in Móra la Nova) was established, exhibiting restored railway material.

The Territorial Plan of the Terres de l'Ebre proposes a land reserve of about 90 hectares near the station for logistics activities associated with freight transport on the line. Following the liberalization of the railway in Spain, a company descended from Tallers Rocafort expressed its intention in 2011 to create a vehicle workshop at the station to serve new private enterprises.

== History ==
The fact that the station is equidistant between Barcelona and Zaragoza led to the installation of a locomotive depot, an intervention workshop, a classification yard, and an electric turntable.

The fuel oil storage and supply facilities in 1956 were the most modern of that time when the transition from steam to electric locomotives took place. Thanks to this, there were about a thousand railroad workers in the region.

Specifically, in the town of Móra la Nova, immigration grew steadily due to the railway. Between 1848 and 1890 (during the creation of the station), the population increased from 698 inhabitants to 1,865 inhabitants.

== Railway services ==
Serveis regionals de Rodalies de Catalunya
Origin/Destination	Preceding station	Rodalies de Catalunya	Following station	Origin/Destination
Terminal¹ Flix Riba-roja d'Ebre	Ascó		Els Guiamets Capçanes¹	Sant Vicenç de Calders Barcelona-Estació de França Barcelona-Sant Andreu Comtal
Casp Zaragoza-Delicias	Ascó		Els Guiamets Capçanes¹	terminal Barcelona-Estació de França Barcelona-Sant Andreu Comtal

1- Some regional trains do not stop at Els Guiamets, with Capçanes being the next or previous stop.

Until December 13, 2008, in addition to regional trains, the Costa Brava Express also stopped, but it ceased to operate on the line.

== Station building ==
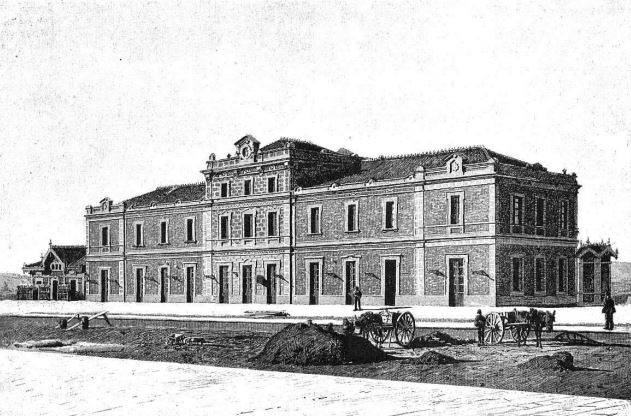
The station in 1890

The station building is an eclectic architectural work from 1891 that is protected as a Cultural Heritage of Local Interest. It is a large isolated rectangular building, consisting of three attached bodies. The central body has a four-sloped tile roof and is distributed over the ground floor, upper floor, and attic, while the two lateral bodies have three-sloped tile roofs and consist of a ground floor and upper floor. In general, all openings are rectangular with molded and whitewashed frames. Those of the lateral bodies have an upper sill and sills supported by small brackets. Those of the central body, on the other hand, have lintels decorated with triangular or rhomboidal shapes. In general, large molded cornices mark the division between the different floors, including the cornices, which also have small decorated triangular panels, resembling pinnacles. It is worth noting the iron porch attached to the facade facing the station platforms and a smaller annex building, also consisting of three attached bodies, with flat and two-sloped tile roofs and organized on a single floor. Currently, the entire complex has been renovated.

== Image gallery ==
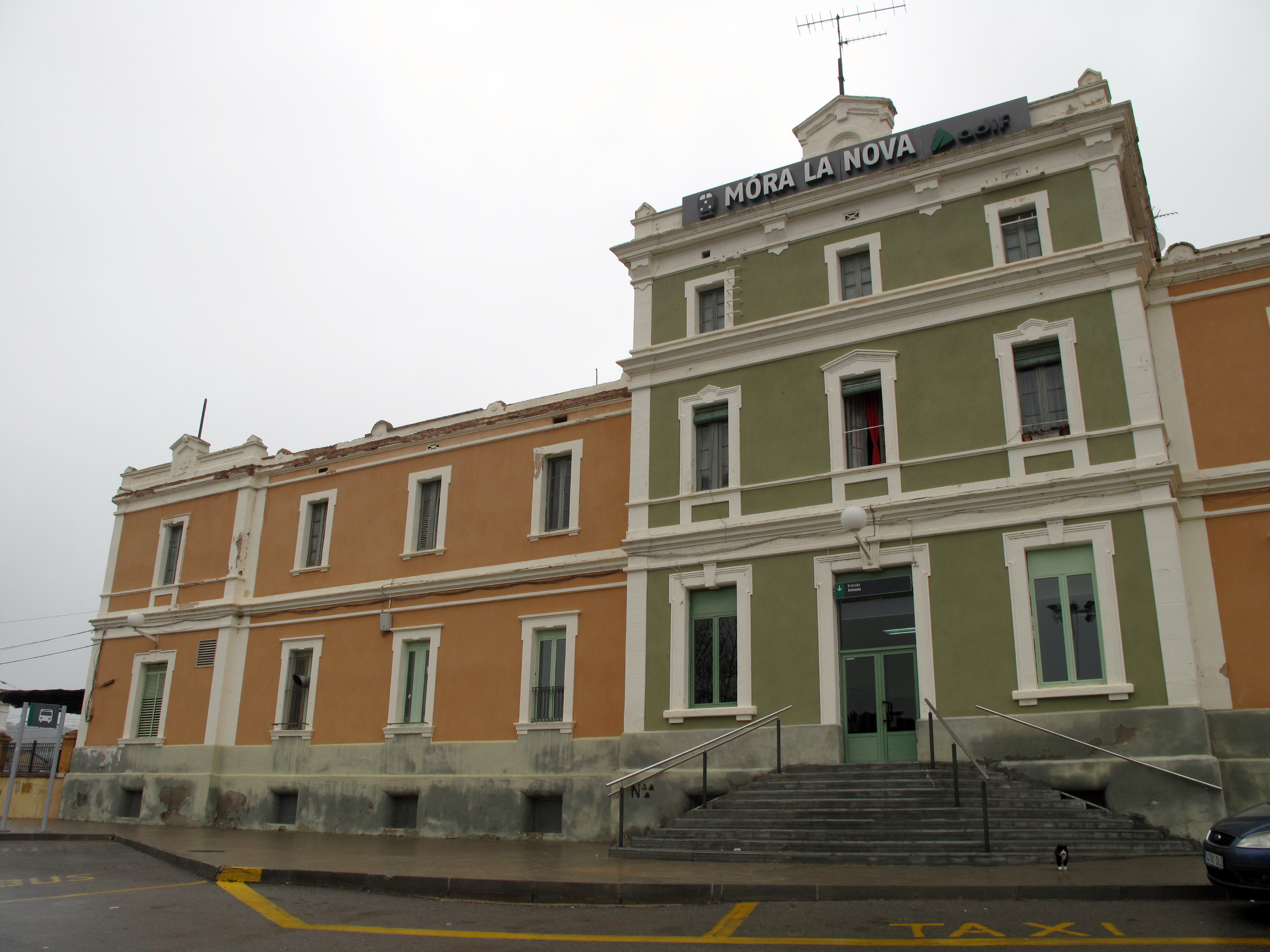
Entrance to the station

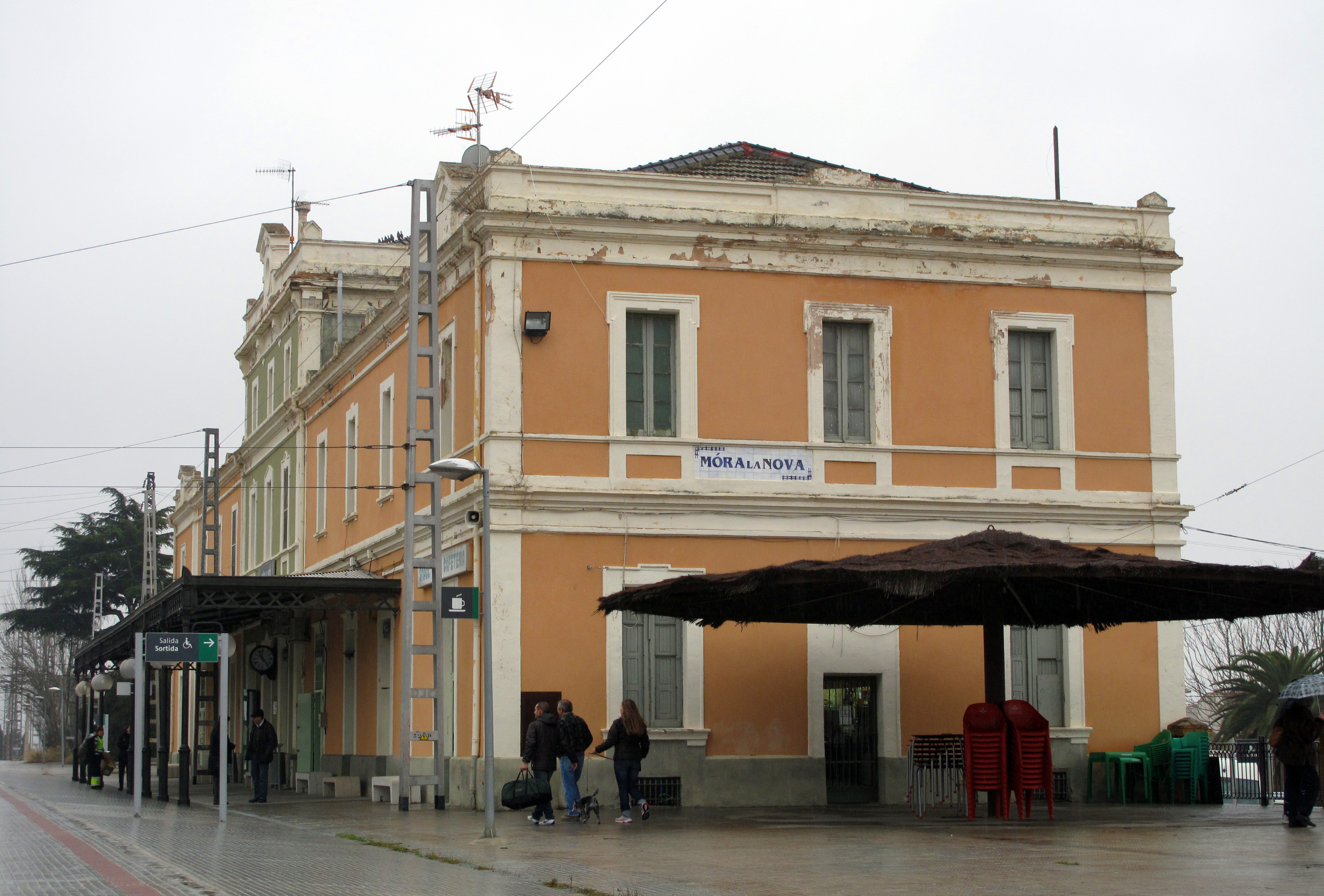
Passenger building

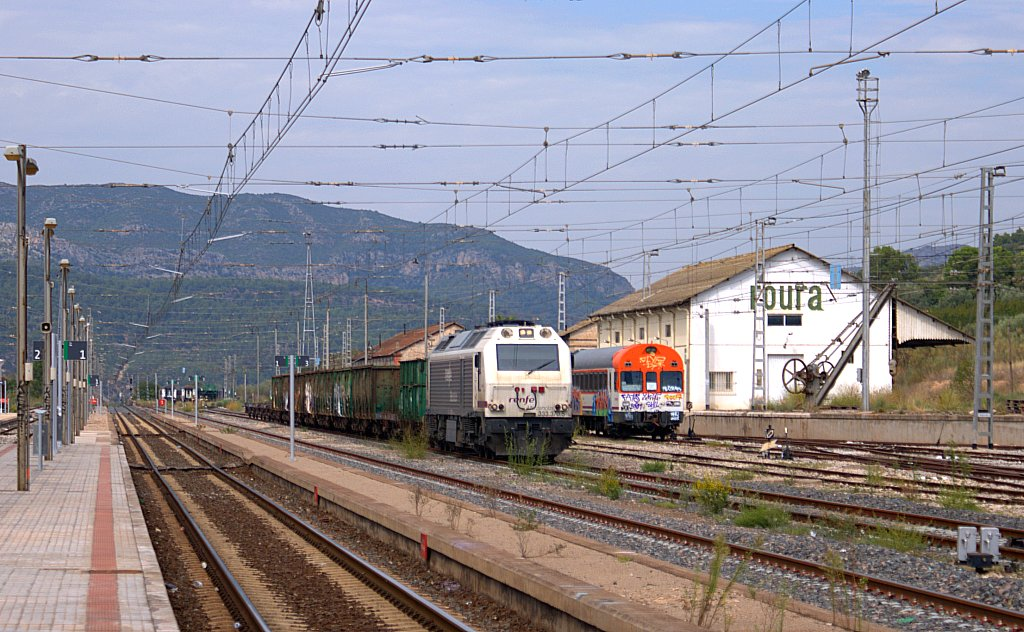
Platforms and tracks at the station

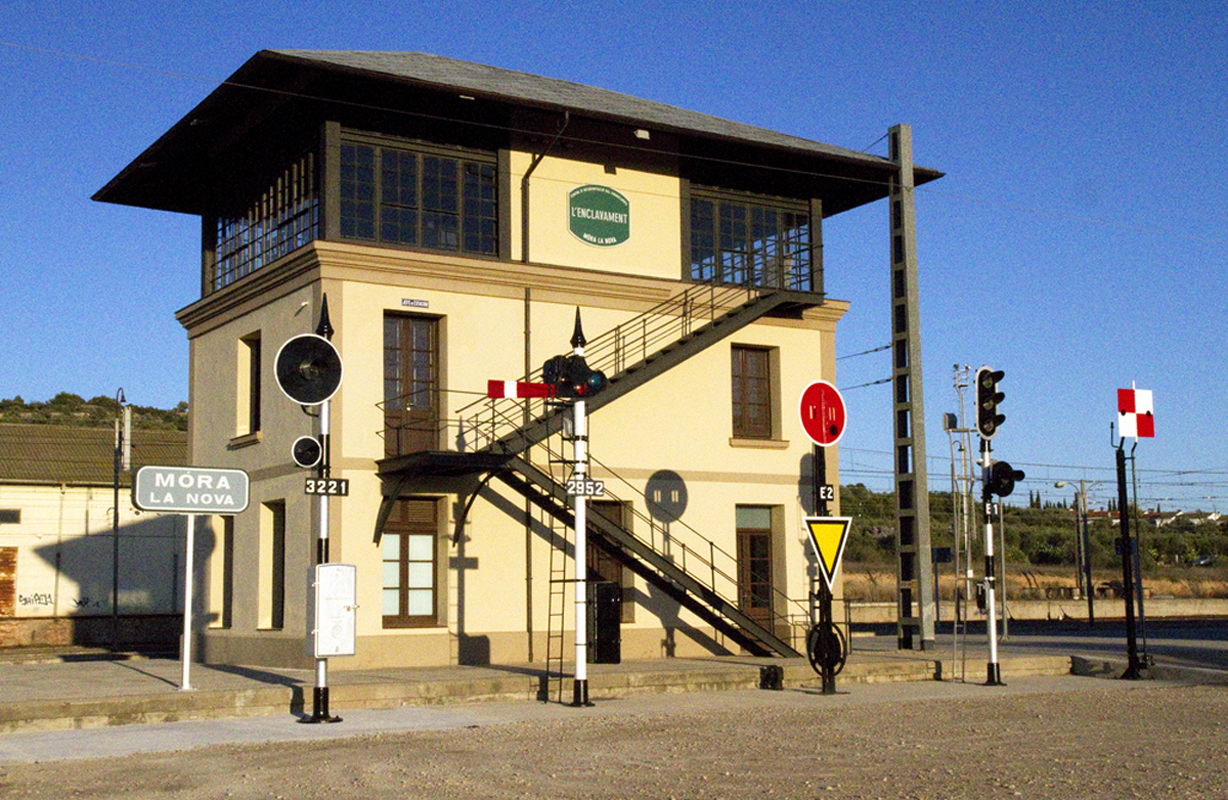
Since 2010, the Railway Museum has been located in Móra la Nova
