= R11 (Rodalies de Catalunya) =

Rail service

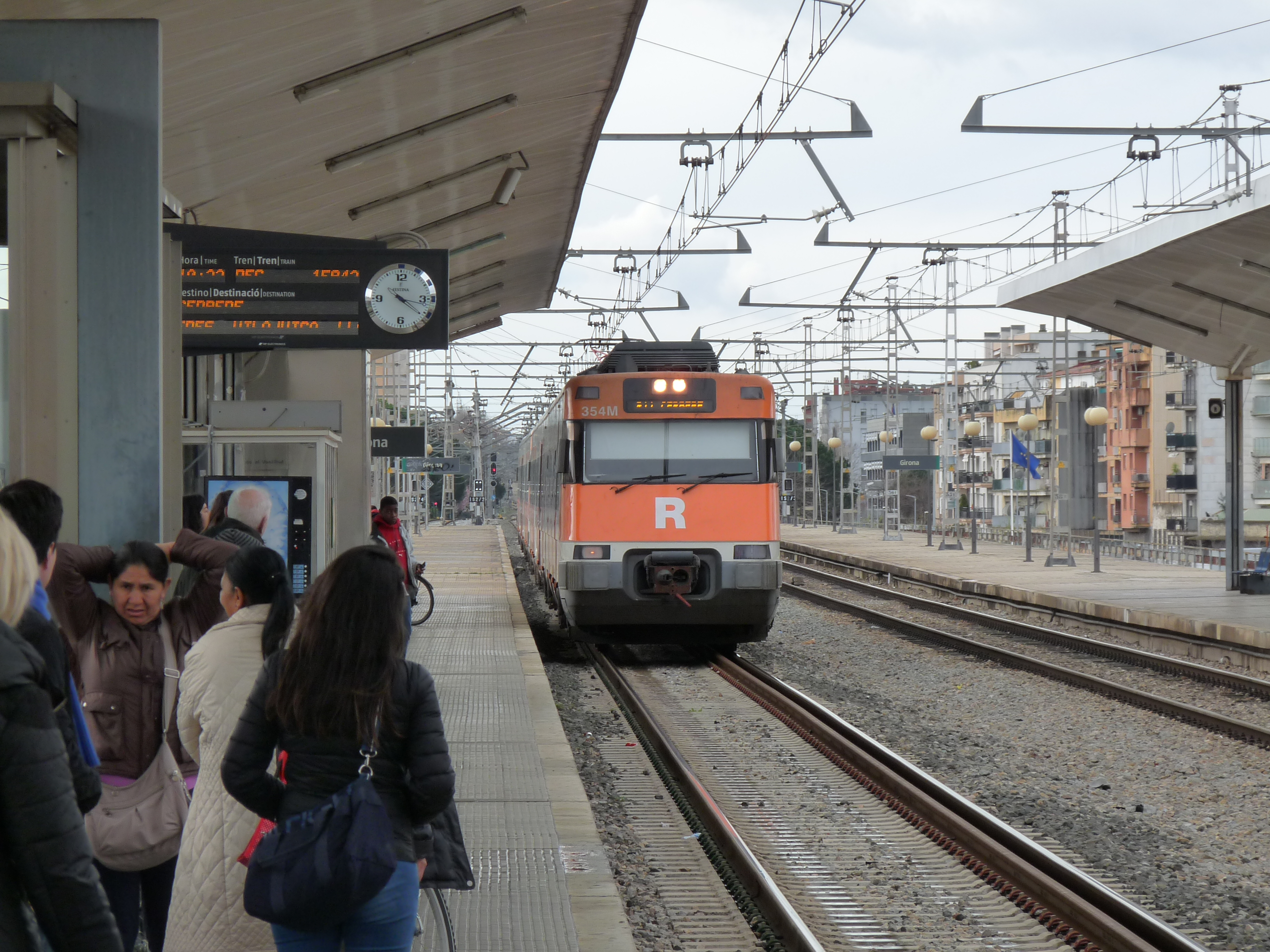
- A 447 Series train on a R11 regional service to Cerbère arriving at Girona railway station in 2017.

Overview
- Service type: Regional rail
- Status: Operational
- Locale: Barcelona and Girona provinces, Catalonia
- Predecessor: Ca2
- First service: 2010 (as R11)
- Current operator: Renfe Operadora

Route
- Termini: Barcelona Sants; Portbou/Cerbère
- Stops: 28
- Distance travelled: 172 km (107 mi)
- Average journey time: 1 h 19 min–2 h 40 min
- Service frequency: Every 30–60 min
- Lines used: Madrid–Barcelona; Barcelona–Cerbère

Technical
- Rolling stock: 447 Series, 449 Series and 470 Series EMUs
- Track gauge: 1,668 mm (5 ft 5 21/32 in) Iberian gauge
- Electrification: 3,000 V DC overhead lines
- Track owner: Adif

The R11 is a line of Rodalies de Catalunya's regional rail service, operated by Renfe Operadora. It runs northwards from the Barcelona area to the French border town of Cerbère, passing through the Vallès Oriental, Selva, Gironès and Alt Empordà regions. With a total line length of 172 kilometres (107 mi), it extends notably beyond the limits of the Barcelona metropolitan area, reaching the Pyrenees mountains.

R11 trains run primarily on the Barcelona–Cerbère railway, using Portbou and/or Cerbère as their northeasternmost terminus, and Barcelona Sants as its southwestern one. They use the Aragó Tunnel in Barcelona, where they share tracks with Rodalies de Catalunya's Barcelona suburban lines R2, R2 Nord and R2 Sud and regional rail lines R13, R14, R15 and R16, calling at Sants and Passeig de Gràcia stations, while they continue to share tracks with Barcelona commuter rail service R2 Nord as far as Maçanet-Massanes, and with the Girona commuter rail service RG1 from Maçanet-Massanes to Portbou.

The Maçanet-Massanes-Portbou section had not previously been considered part of the Barcelona commuter rail service; designated Ca2, the services running on it were part of Renfe Operadora's regional rail division in Catalonia. In 2010, after the administration of the Barcelona commuter rail service was transferred to the Catalan government, the line was passed from the Catalan regional rail division to Rodalies de Catalunya.

== History ==
The current line scheme of the R11 started operating on 1 January 2010, after the transfer of the services from Media Distancia Renfe to the Generalitat of Catalonia. Earlier, all the regional rail services carrying out the line Barcelona-Girona-Figueres-Portbou were branded as Ca2 for the Catalan rail division, and 33 in the nationwide regional rail network. Before 2014, it was the only conventional line to serve the cities of Girona and Figueres (excluding the high-speed lines), until the creation of the Girona commuter rail service RG1, running from Barcelona to Figueres initially, being later extended to Portbou.

== Infrastructure ==
Like the rest of Rodalies de Catalunya lines, the R11 runs on the Iberian gauge mainline railway system, which is owned by Adif, an agency of the Spanish government. All of the railway lines carrying Rodalies de Catalunya services are electrified at 3,000 volts (V) direct current (DC) using overhead lines. The R11 operates on a total line length of 172 kilometres (107 mi), entirely double-track. The trains on the line call at up to 28 stations, using the following railway lines, in order from south to north:

From	To	Railway line	Route number
Barcelona Sants (PK 99)	Aragó Junction (PK 108.3) (after Barcelona Passeig de Gràcia station)	Madrid–Barcelona	260
Aragó Junction (PK 108.3) (after Barcelona Passeig de Gràcia station)	Sant Andreu Comtal (PK 113.2)	Aragó Tunnel	268
Sant Andreu Comtal (PK 113.2)	Cerbère (PK 275.9)	Barcelona–Cerbère	270

All of the infrastructure used by the R11 is shared with other services. Between Barcelona Sants and Barcelona Passeig de Gràcia stations, it shares tracks with Rodalies de Catalunya's Barcelona commuter rail service lines R2, R2 Nord and R2 Sud, regional rail lines R13, R14, R15 and R16, as well as a number of long-distance services to southern Spain, using the Aragó Tunnel through central Barcelona. After Passeig de Gràcia, R11 trains R2 Sud trains, together with the R13, R14, R15 and R16, as well as long-distance services, branch off to Barcelona's Estació de França, terminating there. R11 services continue northwards through the Aragó Tunnel, calling at El Clot-Aragó railway station, and share tracks with the R2 and R2 Nord only. North of Mollet-Sant Fost railway station, Barcelona commuter rail service line R8 and several freight services join their route. The R8 terminates further north at Granollers Centre so that the R11 only shares tracks with the R2 and freight services from this point on up to Maçanet-Massanes. From Maçanet-Massanes, R11 trains share tracks with the Girona commuter rail service RG1 and freight trains for the remainder of their journey.

== Operation ==
All services that initiate from Barcelona Sants as their southern terminus terminate at either Girona, Figueres or continue all the way to Portbou and Cerbère. All services terminating at Cerbère call at all stations. Trains terminating at Girona, Figueres or Portbou, run either calling at all stations, or stopping at only some stations. The first trains run about 6:00 in the morning, with the latest arriving at about 11:00 at night.

The designation of the services on the line depends on the route they operate. Services calling at all stations are branded as R (Regional), operated by RENFE Class 447 trains, while semi-fast services are branded as MD (Media Distancia/Mitjana Distancia), operated by RENFE Class 449 trains, Renfe Operadora's newest rolling stock for regional lines, and are more expensive than R trains..

Service	Route	No. of stations	Journey time	Days of operation	Notes
R	Barcelona Sants – Cerbère	28	2 h 40 min	Daily	Calls at all stations along its route.
R	Barcelona Sants – Portbou	27	2 h 36 min	Daily	Calls at all stations along its route.
MD	Barcelona Sants – Portbou	12	2 h 13 min	Daily	Calls only at Barcelona Passeig de Gracia, Barcelona El Clot-Aragó, Sant Celoni, Maçanet-Massanes, Sils, Caldes de Malavella, Girona, Flaçà, Figueres and Llançà.
MD	Barcelona Sants – Figueres	10	1 h 51 min	Daily	Calls only at Barcelona Passeig de Gracia, Barcelona El Clot-Aragó, Sant Celoni, Maçanet-Massanes, Sils, Caldes de Malavella, Girona and Flaçà.
MD	Barcelona Sants – Girona	8	1 h 21 min	Fri-Sun	Calls only at Barcelona Passeig de Gracia, Barcelona El Clot-Aragó, Sant Celoni, Maçanet-Massanes, Sils and Caldes de Malavella.

== List of stations ==
The following table lists the name of each station served by line R11 in order from south to north; the station's service pattern offered by R and/or MD trains; the transfers to other Rodalies de Catalunya lines, including both commuter and regional rail services; remarkable transfers to other transport systems; the municipality in which each station is located; and the fare zone each station belongs to according to the Autoritat del Transport Metropolità (ATM Àrea de Barcelona) fare-integrated public transport system and Rodalies de Catalunya's own fare zone system for Barcelona commuter rail service lines.

#	Terminal of a service
*	Transfer station to other transport systems
#*	Transfer station and terminal
●	Station served by all trains running through it
○	Limited service station

Station	Service		Rodalies de Catalunya transfers	Other transfers	Municipality	Fare zone	
Station	R	MD	Rodalies de Catalunya transfers	Other transfers	Municipality	ATM AdB	Rod
Barcelona Sants#*	●	●	R1, R2, R2 Nord, R2 Sud, R3, R4, R12, R13, R14, R15, R16, R17, RG1	Renfe Operadora-operated high-speed and long-distance rail services TGV high-speed rail services Barcelona Metro lines 3 and 5 at Sants Estació station National and international coach services	Barcelona	1	1
Barcelona Passeig de Gràcia*	●	●	R2, R2 Nord, R2 Sud, R13, R14, R15, R16, R17	Barcelona Metro lines 2, 3 and 4	Barcelona	1	1
Barcelona El Clot-Aragó*	●	●	R1, R2, R2 Nord, RG1	Barcelona Metro lines 1 and 2	Barcelona	1	1
Barcelona Sant Andreu Comtal*	●		R2, R2 Nord	Barcelona Metro line 1 at Sant Andreu station	Barcelona	1	1
Granollers Centre	●		R2, R2 Nord, R8	—	Granollers	3D	3
Sant Celoni	●		R2 Nord	—	Sant Celoni	4G	5
Gualba	●		R2 Nord	—	Gualba	4G	5
Riells i Viabrea-Breda	●		R2 Nord	—	Riells i Viabrea	4G	5
Hostalric	●		R2 Nord	—	Hostalric	5H	6
Maçanet-Massanes	●	●	R1, R2 Nord, RG1	—	Maçanet de la Selva	6G	6
Sils	●	●	RG1	—	Sils	6	—
Caldes de Malavella	●	●	RG1	—	Caldes de Malavella	6, 7	—
Riudellots	●		RG1	—	Riudellots de la Selva	1	—
Fornells de la Selva	●		RG1	—	Fornells de la Selva	1	—
Girona#*	●	●	RG1	Renfe Operadora-operated high-speed rail services TGV high-speed rail services National and international coach services	Girona	1	—
Celrà	●		RG1	—	Celrà	1, 2	—
Bordils-Juià	●		RG1	—	Bordils	2	—
Flaçà	●	●	RG1	—	Flaçà	2	—
Sant Jordi Desvalls	●		RG1	—	Sant Jordi Desvalls	2	—
Camallera	●		RG1	—	Saus, Camallera i Llampaies	—	
Sant Miquel de Fluvià	●		RG1	—	Sant Miquel de Fluvià	—	—
Vilamalla	●		RG1	—	Vilamalla	—	—
Figueres#	●	●	RG1	—	Figueres	—	—
Vilajuïga	●		RG1	—	Vilajuïga	—	—
Llançà	●	●	RG1	—	Llançà	—	—
Colera	●		RG1	—	Colera	—	—
Portbou#*	●	●	RG1	Intercités long-distance rail services TER Occitanie regional rail services	Portbou	—	—
Cerbère#*	●		—	Intercités long-distance rail services TER Occitanie regional rail services	(Station located in Cerbère, Pyrénées-Orientales, France.)	—	—
