= Rodalies de Catalunya =

Commuter and regional rail system in Catalonia, Spain

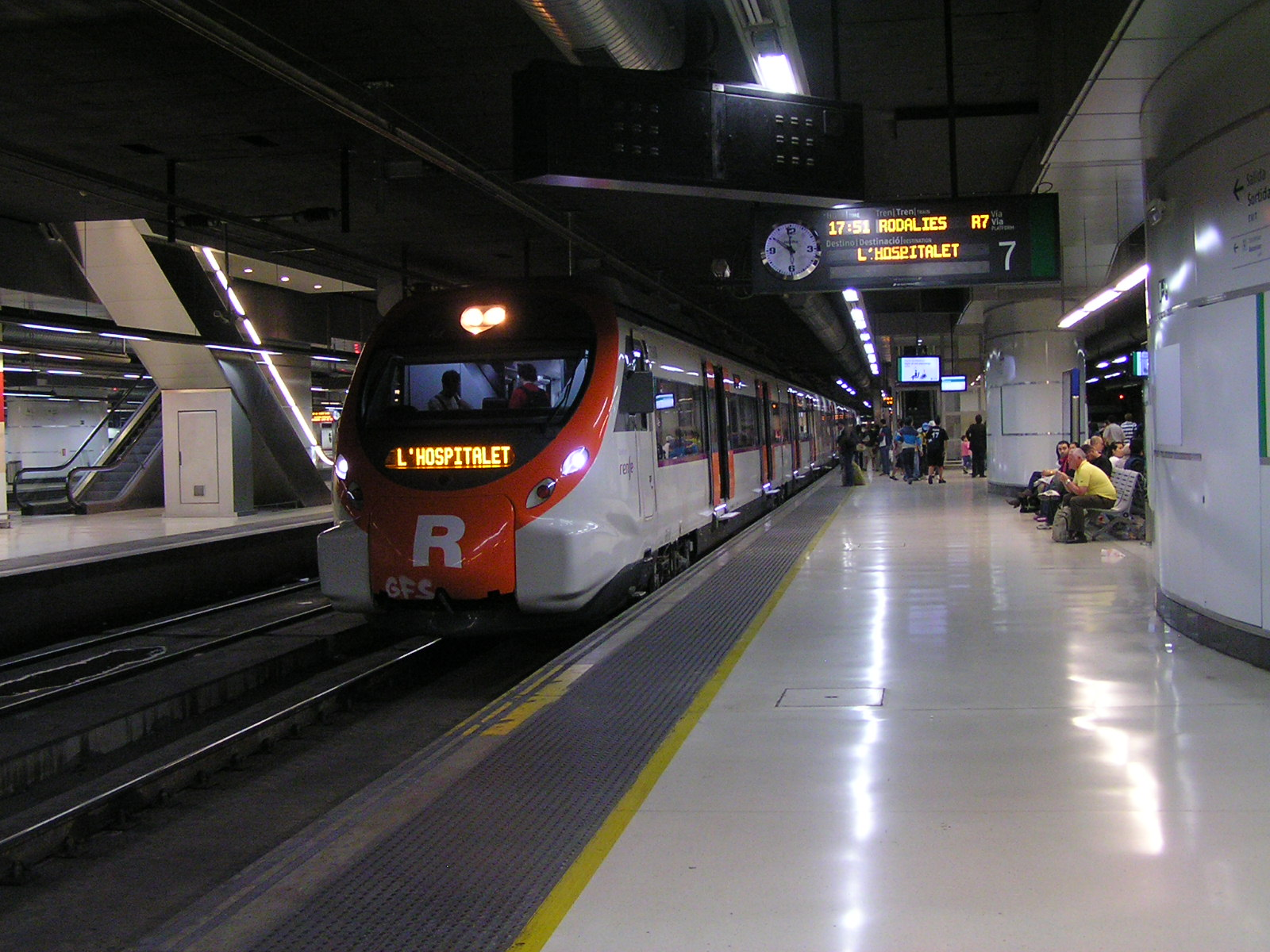
- A Civia train in Rodalies de Catalunya livery on an R7 service at Barcelona-Sants

Overview
- Area served: Catalonia
- Transit type: Commuter rail, regional rail
- Number of lines: 17
- Number of stations: 203
- Daily ridership: 350,000 each weekday
- Annual ridership: 130 million (2023)
- Chief executive: Antonio Carmona
- Website: rodalies.gencat.cat

Operation
- Began operation: 1979 (as Cercanías Barcelona/Rodalia Barcelona); 1 January 2010 (as Rodalies de Catalunya)
- Operator: Renfe Operadora
- Infrastructure manager: Adif

Technical
- Track gauge: 1,668 mm (5 ft 5 21/32 in) Iberian gauge
- Electrification: 3,000 V DC overhead lines

Rodalies de Catalunya (Eastern Catalan: [ruðəˈli.əz ðə kətəˈluɲə]; "Commuter Railways of Catalonia") is the main commuter and regional rail system in the Spanish autonomous community of Catalonia. It is administered by the Government of Catalonia and operated by the national rail operator Renfe Operadora. The system consists of 17 service lines chiefly centred in the Barcelona area, serving a total of 203 stations throughout Catalonia, with an average number of 1,000 trains running on it every day. In 2016, it had an annual ridership of 117 million.

Most of the system is the precursor of several commuter and regional lines running on the Iberian gauge mainline network in Catalonia, which were formerly under the administration of the Spanish government. On 1 January 2010, as a result of the transfer of the administration of the Cercanías commuter railway system for Barcelona, known in Catalan as Rodalies Barcelona, the system was renamed "Rodalies de Catalunya". One year later, Renfe's regional rail services within Catalonia were included in the system after their administration had also been transferred. In 2014, two new commuter rail services in Camp de Tarragona and the Girona area were created as part of the system on 20 and 24 March, respectively.

Rodalies de Catalunya, especially its Barcelona commuter railway service, has been criticised for its high number of incidents, normally resulting in regular delays, although some minor accidents involving injuries have also occurred. The Catalan government has pointed out towards poor investment in the system's infrastructure as the main cause for these. This infrastructure is managed by Adif, which is a public agency, and as such, it falls under the agency's oversight, as it belongs to the national (non-high-speed) rail infrastructure.

== Current system ==
=== Barcelona commuter railway service ===
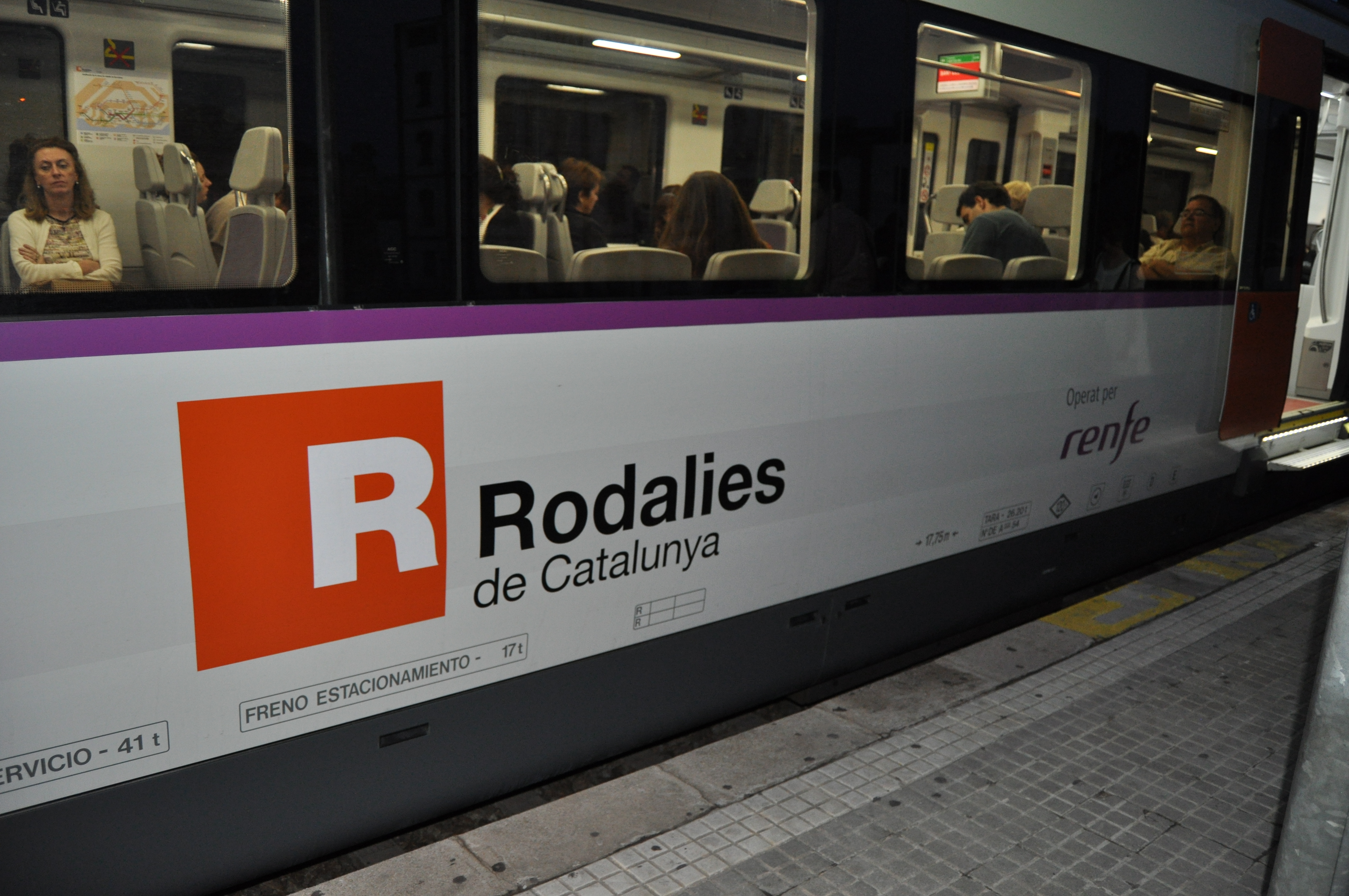
Close-up of the Rodalies livery on a Civia multiple unit

Rodalies de Catalunya's Barcelona commuter railway service consists of eight lines serving a large part of the Barcelona metropolitan area, even extending out of its limits in some cases. Excluding the Vic–Latour-de-Carol portion, it runs on 467 kilometres (290 mi) of railway lines and has 109 stations in 77 municipalities, accounting for a population of 4.7 million. It is calculated that the service has a daily ridership of 350,000 travellers and, according to 2016 figures, an annual ridership of 108.3 million.

All lines (except line R8) are centred in the city of Barcelona, where they run on two underground trunk routes. Lines R3 and R4, and partly lines R1 and R7, use the Meridiana Tunnel, comprising Plaça de Catalunya, Arc de Triomf, La Sagrera-Meridiana and Sant Andreu Arenal stations. Lines R2, R2 Nord and, partially, R2 Sud use the Aragó Tunnel, comprising Passeig de Gràcia and El Clot-Aragó stations. Both trunk routes converge at Barcelona Sants railway station, the service's main station.

Renfe created the Cercanías Barcelona/Rodalia Barcelona branding in 1979 with the aim of absorbing the traffic of passengers who enter and leave the Catalan capital every day. The system became one of the crown jewels of Renfe, however, the reality was that the network was in very poor condition and required modernisation. In 1984 Renfe was in a critical economic situation due to the high number of deficient lines, which is why it decided to close many of them, part of which were saved by the Autonomous Communities. There was a modernisation of facilities, especially in stations, to adapt to new needs. In 1989–1991 Renfe created separate business units, due to the deep reorganisation of the railways on a state level and divided the operation into commuter, medium and long distance services. In 1992 many significant works and transformations were undertaken, one of the most relevant being the removal of the tracks between Estació de França and Sant Adrià de Besòs along the northern Barcelona coastline, and the diversion of Line R1 through La Sagrera as well as the purchase of rolling stock specially designed for commuter services. By 1992 the network had been consolidated in the way we know it today.

The current system is the successor of former Renfe Operadora's Cercanías commuter railway system for Barcelona known as Rodalia Barcelona, and it has kept most of those features. Nevertheless, while all the other Cercanías systems around Spain use letter 'C' (from the Spanish word cercanías) plus a number for identifying their lines, Barcelona's commuter rail system uses letter 'R' instead (from its Catalan equivalent rodalia). As for the numbering, since Rodalies de Catalunya shares market with Ferrocarrils de la Generalitat de Catalunya (FGC) on Barcelona's commuter railways, it can only use numbers from 1 to 10 leaving numbers 5 and 6 for FGC lines.

Since 22 July 2006, a line named R10 has been running between Barcelona–El Prat Airport and Barcelona's Estació de França. However, due to construction works near Barcelona Sant Andreu Comtal railway station, a "temporary" restructuring of lines R2 and R10 was implemented on 31 January 2009; the R10 was suspended and the R2 was divided into three different lines—R2, R2 Nord ("North") and R2 Sud ("South"). The R10 was initially scheduled to resume services two years later.

On 26 June 2011, a restructuring of the service affecting several lines was implemented. It mainly involved the creation of new line R8, the first line ever bypassing Barcelona, and the rerouting of line R7. Before the restructuring, former line R7 ran from L'Hospitalet de Llobregat to Martorell via the Meridiana Tunnel in Barcelona's city centre and Rubí. With the rerouting, it was shortened and started to run as a shuttle line between Cerdanyola Universitat and Barcelona Sant Andreu Arenal stations. New line R8 took over the former route of line R7 between Martorell and Cerdanyola Universitat, then continuing towards Granollers Centre. Thanks to the changes applied on lines R7 and R8, it was able to increase frequencies with a train every 6 minutes and 8 minutes during rush hour on lines R1 and R4, respectively.

Typically, most trains call at all the stations on the line. Nevertheless, some trains on lines R2 Sud, R3 and R4 operate limited service and only call at certain stations. Furthermore, most trains on all lines, excepting lines R2, R7 and R8, operate partial services, being line R1 exclusively operated with partial services.

Rodalies de Catalunya's Barcelona commuter rail service. Other commuter and suburban railway lines in the Barcelona area are also shown, including the Ferrocarrils de la Generalitat de Catalunya-operated Barcelona–Vallès and Llobregat–Anoia lines.

†	Suspended line

Rodalies de Catalunya's Barcelona commuter rail service lines (as of 26 June 2011)
Line	Route	No. of stations	Length	Avg. weekday ridership	Annual ridership	Schedule
R1	Molins de Rei – L'Hospitalet de Llobregat – Mataró/Arenys de Mar – Calella – Blanes – Maçanet-Massanes	31	95.1 km 59.1 mi	102,214 (2008)	28 million (2016)	
R2	Castelldefels – Granollers Centre	14	133 km 82.6 mi	125,948 (2008)	33.6 million (2016)	
R2 Nord	Barcelona–El Prat Airport – Sant Celoni/Maçanet-Massanes	21	133 km 82.6 mi	125,948 (2008)	33.6 million (2016)	
R2 Sud	Sant Vicenç de Calders – Vilanova i la Geltrú – Barcelona Estació de França	17	133 km 82.6 mi	125,948 (2008)	33.6 million (2016)	
R3	L'Hospitalet de Llobregat – Granollers-Canovelles/La Garriga – Vic – Ripoll/Ribes de Freser – Puigcerdà/Latour-de-Carol-Enveitg (Note: Before the service was transferred to the Catalan government, the Vic–Latour-de-Carol section was a separate regional line from the rest of current line R3 known as Ca5. Because of this, and despite being officially included as part of Barcelona commuter rail service line R3, it is still operated as a regional line and its service patterns are different from the rest of the line. For more information on the section's service patterns, see the 'Schedule' section provided in this table.)	35	161.4 km 100.3 mi	22,841 (2008)	6.6 million (2008)	
R4	Sant Vicenç de Calders – Vilafranca del Penedès – Martorell/L'Hospitalet de Llobregat – Terrassa – Manresa	40	143 km 89 mi	105,935 (2008)	33.4 million (2016)	
R7	(Martorell –) (Note: Some early morning services commence at Martorell instead of Barcelona Sant Andreu Arenal, following the route of line R4 from Martorell to Cerdanyola del Vallès.) Barcelona Sant Andreu Arenal – Cerdanyola Universitat	7	13.5 km 8.4 mi	8,140 (2010)	1.9 million (2010)	
R8	Martorell – Cerdanyola Universitat – Granollers Centre	8	40 km 25 mi	?	?	
R10†	Barcelona–El Prat Airport – Barcelona Estació de França	6	22 km 13.7 mi	—	—	—

=== Camp de Tarragona commuter railway service ===
On 20 March 2014, Rodalies de Catalunya began running a commuter rail service in Camp de Tarragona, a region in southern Catalonia mainly centered in the polycentric metropolitan area formed by the cities of Tarragona and Reus. At the time it started services, it was the first commuter rail service in Catalonia not centered in Barcelona. The Camp de Tarragona commuter rail service consists of two lines, which are identified by letters 'RT' (the latter referring to Tarragona) plus a number, serving a total of 13 stations. Both lines converge at Tarragona railway station and are served by stopping trains only. Currently, it does not run on weekends. Line RT1 serves as a reinforcement for regional services between Tarragona and Reus with 9 additional trains in each direction, allowing a service pattern of approximately 30 minutes during rush hour and lower to one hour during off-peak time between the two cities, combining all lines.

On the other hand, line RT2 provides a direct service between the Baix Penedès and the Costa Daurada areas. Before the creation of the line, the L'Arboç–L'Hospitalet de l'Infant route was not possible without interchanging at Sant Vicenç de Calders railway station. Although line RT2 initially ran only between L'Arboç and Cambrils, from 20 June 2014 on, some trains travel further west to L'Hospitalet de l'Infant stopping at Mont-roig del Camp.

Camp de Tarragona commuter rail service, including other Rodalies de Catalunya lines that also serve the area.

Rodalies de Catalunya's Camp de Tarragona commuter rail service lines (as of 20 June 2014)
Line	Route	Avg. weekday frequency	No. of stations	Length	Schedule
RT1	Reus – Tarragona	18 trains per day	3	18.1 km 11.3 mi	
RT2	L'Hospitalet de l'Infant – Tarragona – Sant Vicenç de Calders – L'Arboç	10 trains per day	11	69.1 km 42.9 mi	

=== Girona commuter railway service ===
The Girona commuter rail service started services on 24 March 2014, four days after the Camp de Tarragona commuter rail service did so, becoming the second commuter rail service in Catalonia not centered in Barcelona. It consists of a single 44-station line named RG1 (letter 'G' referring to Girona), which directly links the Alt Empordà, Gironès, Selva and Maresme areas. Before the RG1 started services, its route was only possible by interchanging at Maçanet-Massanes railway station. In addition, the RG1 has improved the service pattern at stations in the Girona area.

Line RG1 is actually an extension of some trains on Barcelona commuter rail service line R1 which formerly terminated at Maçanet-Massanes. Due to this fact, line RG1's L'Hospitalet de Llobregat–Mataró section, despite not serving as a Girona-centered commuter rail line, but as a Barcelona-centered one, is included as part of the Girona commuter rail service. At the beginning, the RG1 did not run on weekends and ran exclusively between L'Hospitalet de Llobregat and Figueres. However, from 20 June 2014 on, some trains travel further north towards Portbou and additional weekend services are offered during the summer season.

Girona commuter rail service, including other Rodalies de Catalunya lines that also serve the area.

Rodalies de Catalunya's Girona commuter rail service lines (as of 20 June 2014)
Line	Route	Avg. weekday frequency	No. of stations	Length	Schedule
RG1	L'Hospitalet de Llobregat – Mataró – Figueres – Portbou	16 trains per day	40	181.2 km 112.6 mi	

=== Lleida commuter railway service ===
The Lleida commuter rail service started services on 16 March 2015, becoming the third commuter rail service in Catalonia not centered in Barcelona. It consists of five lines; two labelled RL1 and RL2 (letter 'L' referring to Lleida), which directly link Lleida with Balaguer and Àger areas, on the Lleida-La Pobla Line, operated by Ferrocarrils de la Generalitat de Catalunya (FGC), and parts of regional lines R13 and R14 (see below), operated by Renfe Operadora. In 2024, a further two lines, RL3 and RL4, were added to the Lleida commuter rail network, linking Lleida to Cervera and Terrassa . The lines are planned to also be operated by FGC, but are temporarily operated by Renfe with Rodalies de Catalunya rolling stock.

Lleida commuter rail service, including other Rodalies de Catalunya lines that also serve the area.

Ferrocarrils de la Generalitat de Catalunya's Lleida commuter rail service lines (as of 10 January 2025)
Line	Route	Avg. weekday frequency	No. of stations	Length	Schedule
RL1	Lleida Pirineus – Balaguer	6 trains per day	6	26.1 km 16.3 mi	
RL2	Lleida Pirineus – Balaguer – Àger – La Pobla de Segur	6 trains per day	17	89.4 km 55.9 mi	

Rodalies de Catalunya's Lleida commuter rail service lines (as of 10 January 2025)
Line	Route	Avg. weekday frequency	No. of stations	Length	Schedule
RL3	Lleida Pirineus – Cervera	7 trains per day	9	56.5 km 35.1 mi	
RL4	Lleida Pirineus – Cervera – Manresa – Terrassa Estació del Nord	5 trains per day	18	150.1 km 93.2 mi	

For the regional Renfe Operadora-operated lines, see below.

=== Regional railway services ===
Rodalies de Catalunya's division for regional rail services consists of six lines centered in Barcelona that serve the whole of Catalonia and are sometimes extended towards the neighboring Spanish autonomous communities of Aragon and the Valencian Community as well as the French region of Languedoc-Roussillon. Although Estació de França serves as the main terminus station in Barcelona for most regional lines, especially those traveling towards southern and western Catalonia, all of them converge at Barcelona Sants only, which serves as the center of the service. The 2013 annual ridership for the regional rail services was 9.267 million.

Regional services run on major corridors between Barcelona and other cities in Catalonia, excluding the Barcelona–Mataró and the Barcelona–Vilafranca del Penedès corridors, which are served by Barcelona commuter rail service lines R1 and R4, respectively. In addition, none of the regional services calls at all stations near Barcelona, which are already served by the city's commuter rail service. Yet, they usually stop at almost all the stations in Barcelona city centre.

The system's division for regional services is the precursor of several Renfe Operadora's Media Distancia regional lines in Catalonia, which were identified using letters 'Ca' (from the Catalan or the Spanish language form of Catalonia, Catalunya and Cataluña, respectively) plus a number. With the transfer of all regional services to the Catalan government, the lines happened to be identified with letter 'R' like the already transferred Barcelona commuter rail service lines. In order to differentiate the regional lines from those that are part of the Barcelona commuter rail service, the first ones use only numbers larger than 10—currently, numbers 11–16—, leaving numbers 1–10 for Barcelona commuter rail service lines.

Rodalies de Catalunya's regional lines have kept the same operating scheme just like before they were transferred, similarly to all other Renfe Operadora's Media Distancia lines around Spain. Likewise, there exist different types of train services. Specifically, the following types of train services are present in the system's division for regional lines:

- Regional (R): These services usually call at all the stations on the line.
- Regional Exprés (RE): In contrast to R services, RE services have fewer stops and are faster. They are, however, slightly more expensive than R services.
- Media Distancia/Mitjana Distància (MD): Similar to RE services referring to the number of stops and operating speed, though they are exclusively operated by Renfe series 449 trains, Renfe Operadora's newest rolling stock for regional lines, and are more expensive than RE trains. Currently, they run only on line R11.

Rodalies de Catalunya's regional lines (as of 24 March 2014)
Line	Route	Avg. weekday frequency	Type of services	No. of stations	Length	Previous name	Schedule
R11	Barcelona Sants – Granollers Centre – Girona – Figueres – Portbou/Cerbère (Note: Although all inbound services towards Barcelona commence at Portbou, most outbound Regional (R) services cross the French border and terminate at Cerbère.)	46 trains per day	MD, R	28	170 km 110 mi	Ca2	
R13	Barcelona Estació de França – Vilanova i la Geltrú – Valls – Montblanc – Lleida Pirineus	4 trains per day (Note: There are also 2 additional services between Sant Vicenç de Calders and La Plana-Picamoixons.)	R, RE	30	176 km 109.4 mi	Ca4a	
R14	Barcelona Estació de França – Vilanova i la Geltrú – Tarragona – Reus – Montblanc – Lleida Pirineus	5 trains per day (Note: There is also 1 additional service between Tarragona and La Plana-Picamoixons.)	R, RE	31	204 km 126.8 mi	Ca4a	
R15	Barcelona Estació de França – Vilanova i la Geltrú – Tarragona – Reus – Móra la Nova – Riba-roja d'Ebre (– Caspe)	25 trains per day	R, RE	23	190 km 118 mi	Ca3	
R16	Barcelona Estació de França – Vilanova i la Geltrú – Tarragona – Tortosa/Ulldecona-Alcanar-La Sénia (– Vinaròs/Valencia Estació del Nord) (Note: After having branched off towards Tortosa, some trains reverse out in order to pick up again the main line towards Valencia.)	17 trains per day	R, RE	19	211 km 131.1 mi	Ca1	
R17	Barcelona Estació de França – Vilanova i la Geltrú – Tarragona – Port Aventura	20 trains per day	R, RE	9	102 km 63.6 mi		

== Ticketing ==
In the Barcelona area, Rodalies de Catalunya participates in the Autoritat del Transport Metropolità's integrated fare system, allowing the use of standardised zone-based tickets with transfers to other operators such as the Barcelona Metro. In other regions, commuter rail tickets for other integrated fare systems are available from Autoritat Territorial de la Mobilitat del Camp de Tarragona, Autoritat Territorial de la Mobilitat de l'Àrea de Girona, and Autoritat Territorial de la Mobilitat de l'Àrea de Lleida.

Rodalies de Catalunya also offers its own zone-based fare system. These tickets do not permit transfers to other modes, such as bus or metro, and allow the purchase of single tickets (as opposed to the multi-ticket sales for ATM). Fares within the Barcelona area start at €2.55 for one zone to €7.40 for six zones.

== Rolling stock ==
Rodalies de Catalunya operates a variety of EMUs providing different services on the network's different lines.

=== Current fleet ===
Renfe Class 470

Refurbished Renfe Class 440 units used on regional and Media Distancia services. They were introduced in the 1970s and refurbished in the 1990s.

Renfe Class 447

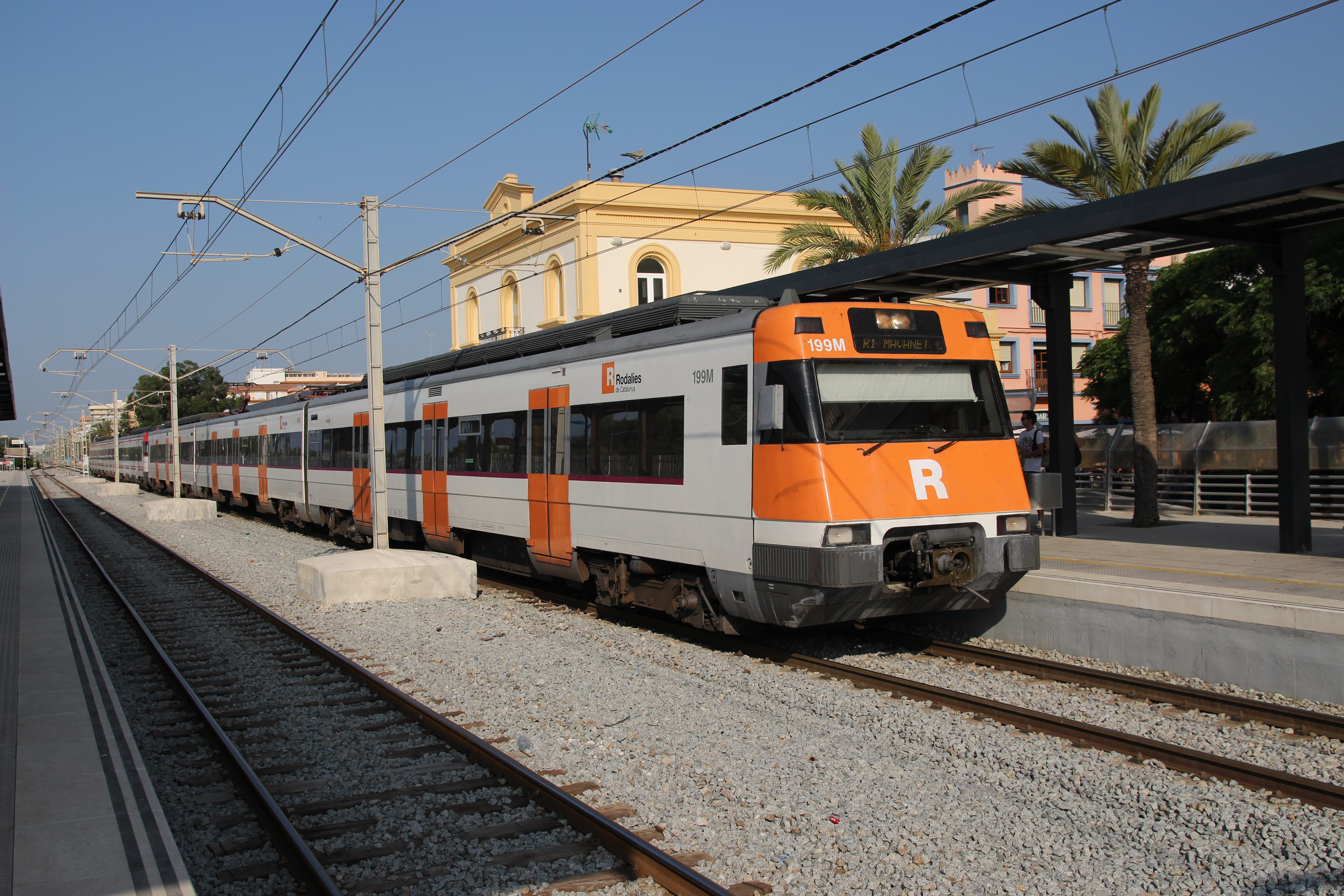
A Class 447 unit in Malgrat de Mar

The most common class of EMU in the network, serving as the backbone of most commuter lines and providing some regional service, such as on R3. They have operated in Catalonia since 1993, replacing the similar Class 446.

Renfe Class 463, 464 and 465

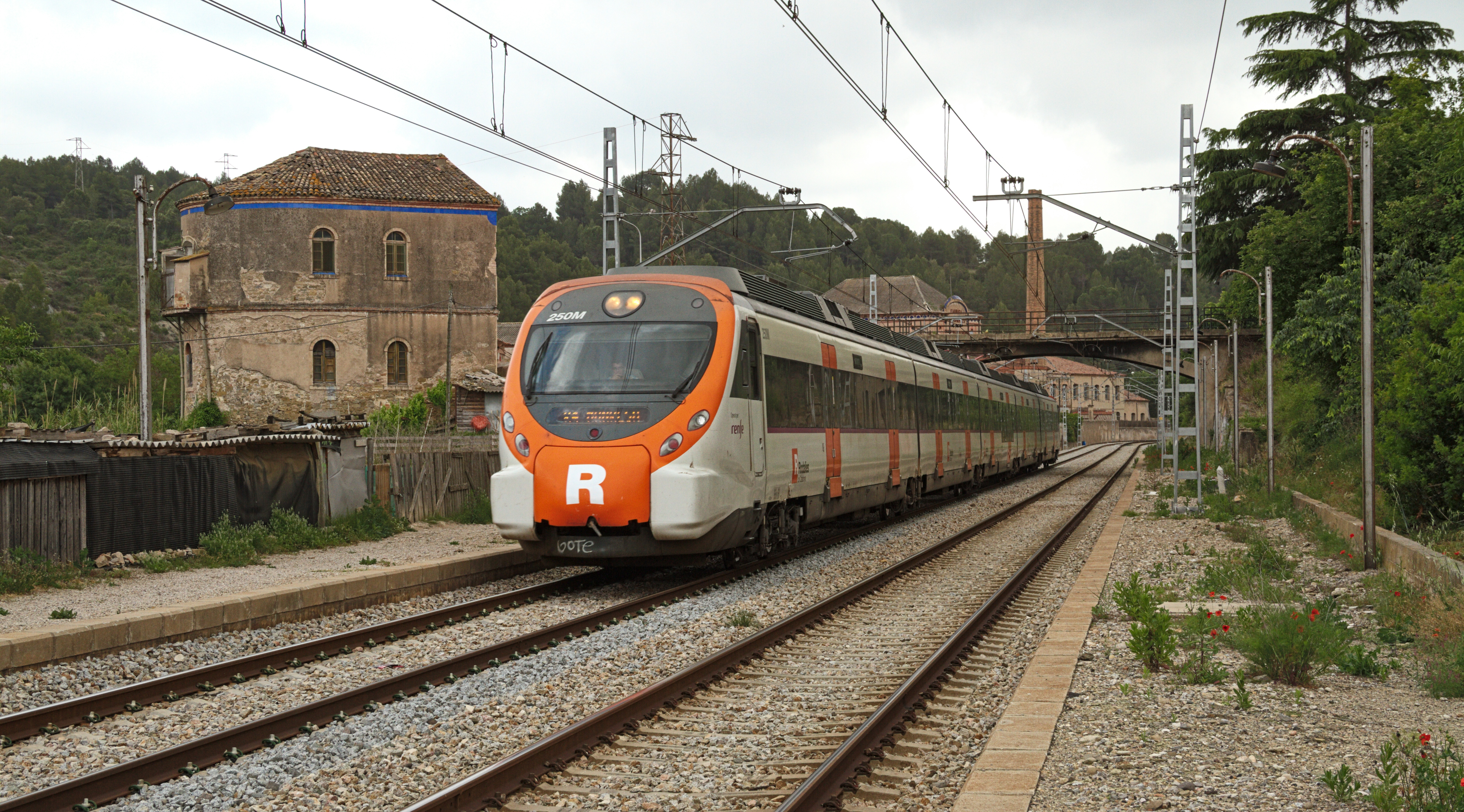
A Class 465 unit in Els Comtals, Manresa

The most modern commuter EMUs on the network, part of the Civia class. They feature a low-level door to provide access to PRM. They were first introduced in 2006.

Renfe Class 450, 451

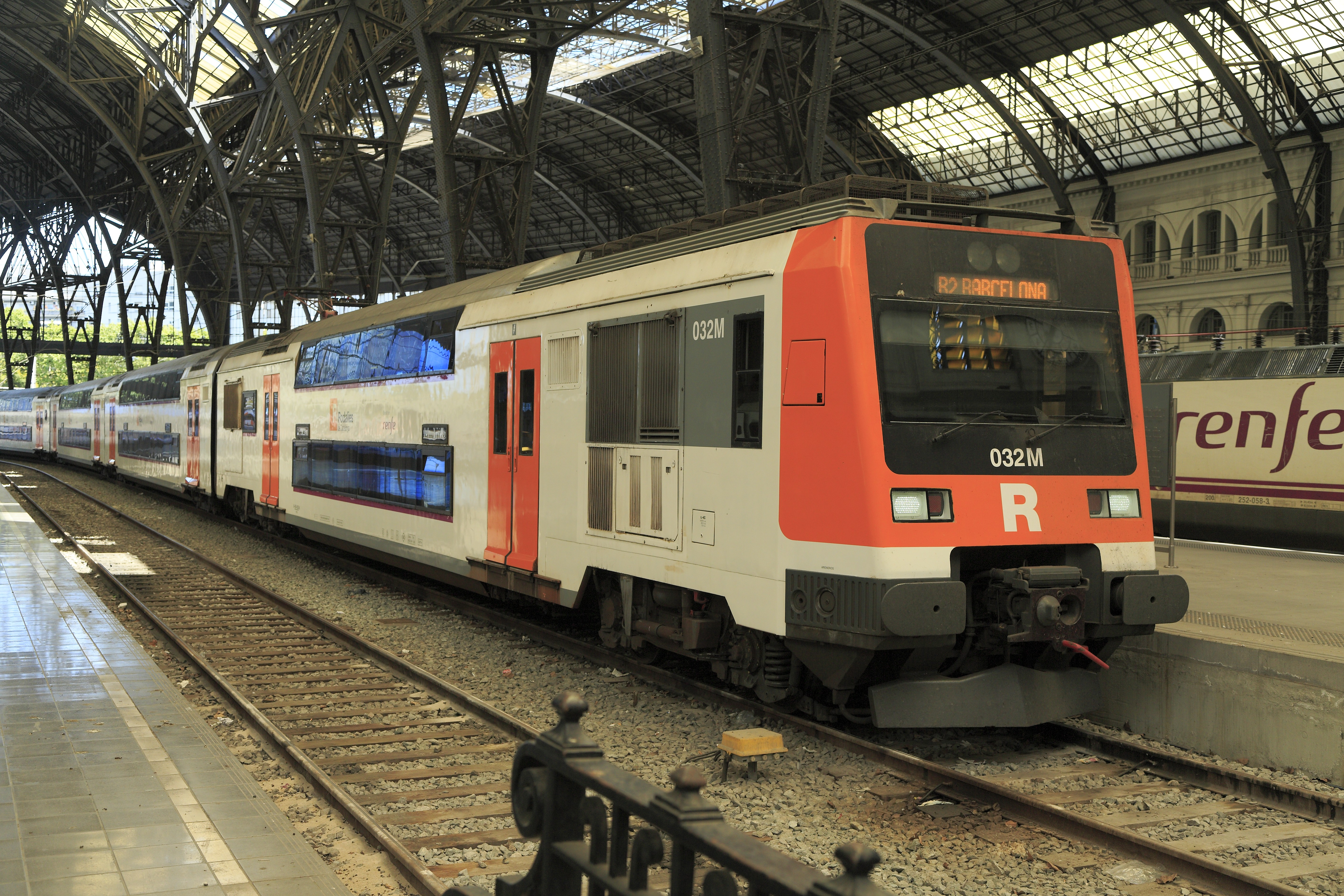
A Renfe Class 450 unit in Estació de França

2 floor EMUs used for commuter services on lines R2 and R2 Sud. 450 units are composed of 6 cars and 451 of only 3. They have been in service on the Rodalies network since the early 1990s.

Renfe Class 448

3 car EMUs with a top speed of 160 km/h, used on regional services linking Barcelona and other Catalan provinces. Introduced in the late 1980s.

Renfe Class 449

Modern 5 car EMUs used on regional services. Introduced in the late 2000s, they operate exclusively on line R11, between Barcelona and Portbou.

=== Future fleet ===
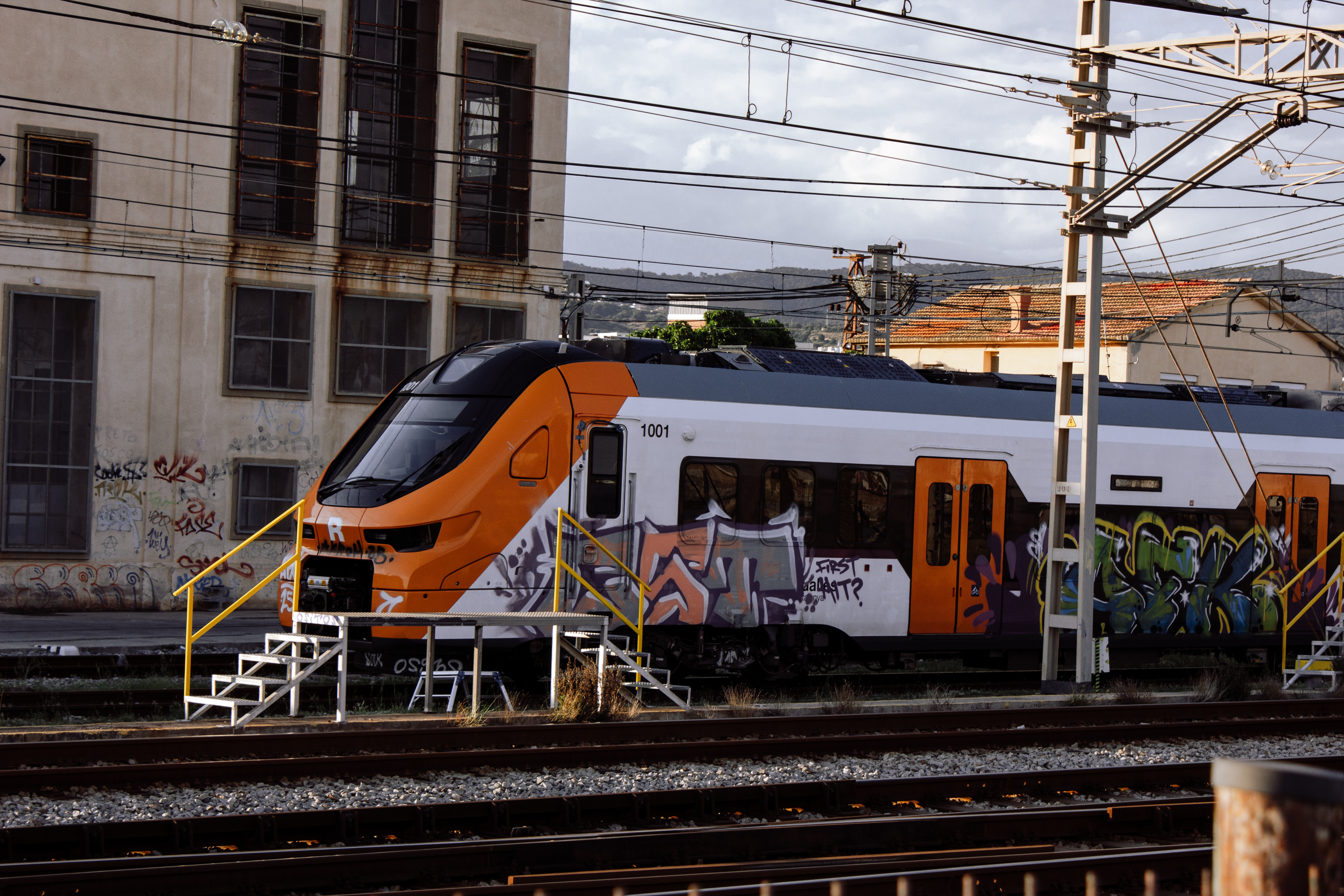
A Renfe Class 452 unit in testing near Mataró

In 2021, the Spanish Ministry of Transport announced the purchase of a large order of new EMUs to renovate and expand the commuter rail fleet operated by Renfe, mainly in the networks of Barcelona and Madrid. The contract was won by Alstom and Stadler Rail Valencia. In January 2025, the new Alstom trains were presented at the company's factory in Santa Perpètua de Mogoda. It was confirmed that 72 Renfe Class 452 trains would bolster the fleet of Rodalies de Catalunya, starting trial operations in 2025 to enter service in 2026. In addition, 38 more units manufactured by CAF will provide regional services in the future.

Renfe Class 452

Manufactured by Alstom at the Santa Perpètua de Mogoda plant, the series is based on the Alstom Coradia family. The units are 6 car compositions featuring both 1-floor and 2-floor passenger cars (the latter being the 2 middle cars). The units are 100 meters in length, have a top speed of 140 km/h and capacity for 905 passengers. The trains feature two train protection systems, ASFA and ETCS.

== Major incidents ==
The Castelldefels train accident took place on June 23, 2010, soon after the current Rodalies network started operation. 12 people died as they crossed the tracks in Platja de Castelldefels station and were struck by an Alaris express train. The victims had just descended from a Rodalies train and were unable to see the other train coming on the opposite track.

On 20 November 2018, a train on the R4 line derailed due to a landslide between the Vacarisses and Vacarisses Torreblanca stations, causing one death and 49 injuries. Another derailment on the same line occurred on 8 February 2019 between Sant Vicenç de Castellet and Manresa, killing the driver and injuring several other people.

The infrastructure of several lines on the network was damaged by the storm Gloria in January 2020, with a bridge over the Tordera river collapsing on the R1 line near Malgrat de Mar.

On September 10, 2023, four people died as they were struck by a train while they attempted to cross the tracks of the R3 line near Montmeló.

On May 12, 2024, a copper theft near Montcada Bifurcació station caused a fire that damaged critical electrical infrastructure, which led to a collapse of the entire Rodalies network. Coinciding with the 2024 Catalan regional election, the massive disruption caused by the incident initially led to suspicions of sabotage.

The Rodalies network was affected by the 2025 Iberian Peninsula blackout, with full service resuming 48 hours after the initial power outage.

=== Gelida train derailment ===
On January 20, 2026, a retaining wall collapsed under a highway underpass on the R4 line, between the stations of Gelida and Sant Sadurní d'Anoia. The wall collapsed as a Class 447 train passed, causing it to derail and killing a trainee driver who was traveling in the driver's cab. On the same day, several more incidents were reported throughout the network due to extreme weather, including another derailment on the R1 line near Tordera which caused no victims. All rail service was suspended on the Rodalies network the next day.

== See also ==
- List of Rodalies de Catalunya stations
- Cercanías
- Ferrocarrils de la Generalitat de Catalunya (FGC), another commuter and rapid transit operator in Catalonia
