= RT1 (Rodalies de Catalunya) =

Train service in Catalonia, Spain

Overview
- Service type: Commuter rail
- Status: Operational
- Locale: Tarragona and Reus
- First service: 20 March 2014
- Current operator(s): Renfe Operadora

Route
- Termini: Reus; Tarragona
- Stops: 3
- Distance travelled: 18.1 km (11.2 mi)
- Average journey time: 14 min
- Service frequency: Every 20 min-5 h
- Line(s) used: Tarragona-Lleida; Valencia-Sant Vicenç de Calders

Technical
- Rolling stock: Renfe Class 447 EMUs
- Track gauge: 1,668 mm (5 ft 5 21/32 in) Iberian gauge
- Electrification: 3,000 V DC overhead lines
- Track owner(s): Adif

The RT1 is a line of Rodalies de Catalunya's Tarragona commuter rail service, operated by Renfe Operadora. It links Reus railway station in the city of Reus with Tarragona railway station, in the city center of Tarragona. The RT1 shares tracks for the entirety of its length with regional rail lines R14, R15 and R16, acting as a feeder line with additional services between these two areas. RT1 services started operating in 2014, becoming the first commuter service to use the Tarragona-Lleida railway, originally designed to serve regional as well as inter-city rail.

== List of stations ==
The following table lists the name of each station served by line RT1 in order from west to east; the station's service pattern offered by RT2 trains; the transfers to other Rodalies de Catalunya lines, including both commuter and regional rail services; remarkable transfers to other transport systems; the municipality in which each station is located; and the fare zone each station belongs to according to the Autoritat del Transport Metropolità (ATM Àrea de Barcelona) fare-integrated public transport system and Rodalies de Catalunya's own fare zone system for Barcelona commuter rail service lines.

#	Terminal of a service
*	Transfer station to other transport systems
#*	Transfer station and terminal
●	Station served by all trains running through it
○	Limited service station

Station	Service	Rodalies de Catalunya transfers	Other transfers	Municipality	Fare zone	
Station	Service	Rodalies de Catalunya transfers	Other transfers	Municipality	ATM AdT	Rod
Reus#	●	R14, R15	—	Reus	1	—
Vila-seca	●	R14, R15, R16	—	Vila-seca	1	—
Tarragona#*	●	R14, R15, R16, R17, RT2	Renfe Operadora-operated long-distance rail services	Tarragona	1	—
