= R16 (Rodalies de Catalunya) =

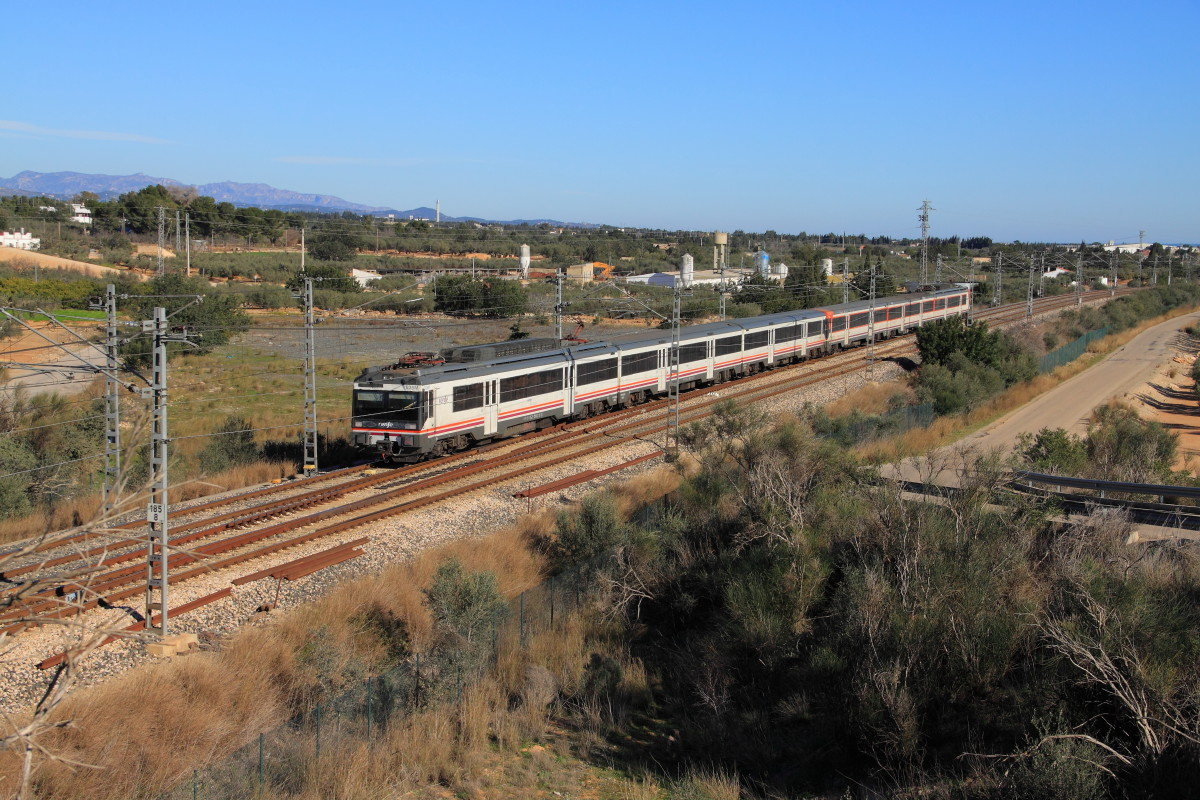
- A 470 Series train on a R16 regional service to Tortosa near L'Aldea-Amposta-Tortosa in 2013.

Overview
- Service type: Regional rail
- Status: Operational
- Locale: Barcelona and Tarragona provinces
- Predecessor: Ca1
- First service: 1 January 2010 (as R16)
- Current operator: Renfe Operadora

Route
- Termini: Tortosa/Ulldecona-Alcanar-La Sénia (Note: Some services (usually 1–2 per day) continue to Vinaròs.); Barcelona Estació de França
- Stops: 19
- Distance travelled: 172 km (107 mi)
- Average journey time: 1 h 19 min–2 h 40 min
- Service frequency: Every 1–2 h
- Lines used: Valencia–Sant Vicenç de Calders; L'Aldea-Amposta-Tortosa; Madrid–Barcelona

Technical
- Rolling stock: 447 Series, 448 Series, 449 Series and 470 Series EMUs
- Track gauge: 1,668 mm (5 ft 5 21/32 in) Iberian gauge
- Electrification: 3,000 V DC overhead lines
- Track owner: Adif

The R16 is a line of Rodalies de Catalunya's regional rail service, operated by Renfe Operadora. It runs southwards from the Barcelona area to the town of Tortosa, passing through the Vallès Occidental, Baix Llobregat, Garraf, Baix Penedès, Camp de Tarragona, Baix Ebre and Montsià regions. With a total line length of 172 kilometres (107 mi), it extends notably beyond the limits of the Barcelona metropolitan area, along the Mediterranean coast.

R16 trains run primarily on the Valencia–Sant Vicenç de Calders railway, using Tortosa and/or Ulldecona-Alcanar-La Sénia as their southernmost terminus, and Barcelona Estació de França as its northern one. They use the Aragó Tunnel in Barcelona, where they share tracks with Rodalies de Catalunya's Barcelona suburban lines R2, R2 Nord and R2 Sud and regional rail lines R11, R13, R14, R15 and R17, calling at Sants and Passeig de Gràcia stations, while they continue to share tracks with Barcelona commuter rail service R2 Sud as far as Sant Vicenç de Calders, and with the Tarragona commuter rail services RT2 and RT1 from Tarragona to Sant Vicenç de Calders and Vila-seca, respectively.

== History ==
The current line scheme of the R16 started operating on 1 January 2010, after the transfer of the services from Media Distancia Renfe to the Generalitat of Catalonia. Earlier, all the regional rail services carrying out the line Barcelona-Tarragona-Tortosa-Ulldecona were branded as Ca1 for the Catalan rail division, and 32 in the nationwide regional rail network. Its initial alignment used the line close to the coast passing through Salou, Cambrils and L'Hospitalet de l'Infant. On 13 January 2020, the line's alignment was partially altered, as a result of the opening of a new inland line between Tarragona and L'Ametlla de Mar, and the closure of the coastal line. The coastal line segment from Tarragona to Port Aventura was taken over by R17, which came into service the same day.

== List of stations ==
The following table lists the name of each station served by line R16 in order from south to north; the station's service pattern offered by R16 trains; the transfers to other Rodalies de Catalunya lines, including both commuter and regional rail services; remarkable transfers to other transport systems; the municipality in which each station is located; and the fare zone each station belongs to according to the Autoritat del Transport Metropolità (ATM Àrea de Barcelona) fare-integrated public transport system and Rodalies de Catalunya's own fare zone system for Barcelona commuter rail service lines.

| # | Terminal of a service |
| * | Transfer station to other transport systems |
| #* | Transfer station and terminal |
| ● | Station served by all trains running through it |
| ○ | Limited service station |

| Station | Service | Rodalies de Catalunya transfers | Other transfers | Municipality | Fare zone | | |
| Station | Service | Rodalies de Catalunya transfers | Other transfers | Municipality | ATM AdT | ATM AdB | Rod |
|---|---|---|---|---|---|---|---|
| Ulldecona-Alcanar-la Sénia# | ● | — | — | Ulldecona | — | — | — |
| Tortosa#* | ● | — | Renfe Operadora-operated high-speed rail services | Tortosa | — | — | — |
| Camp-redó | ● | — | — | Tortosa | — | — | — |
| L'Aldea-Amposta-Tortosa#* | ● | — | Renfe Operadora-operated high-speed rail services | L'Aldea | — | — | — |
| Camarles-Deltebre | ● | — | — | Camarles | — | — | — |
| L'Ampolla-Perelló-Deltebre | ● | — | — | L'Ampolla | — | — | — |
| L'Ametlla de Mar | ● | — | — | L'Ametlla de Mar | — | — | — |
| L'Hospitalet de l'Infant* | ● | — | Renfe Operadora-operated high-speed rail services | Vandellòs i l'Hospitalet de l'Infant | 2, 1 | — | — |
| Cambrils* | ● | — | Renfe Operadora-operated high-speed rail services | Cambrils | 1 | — | — |
| Vila-seca | ● | R14, R15, RT1 | — | Vilaseca | 1 | — | — |
| Tarragona* | ● | R14, R15, R17, RT1, RT2 | Renfe Operadora-operated medium-distance rail services | Tarragona | 1 | — | — |
| Altafulla-Tamarit | ● | R14, R15, R17, RT2 | — | Altafulla | 1 | — | — |
| Torredembarra | ● | R14, R15, R17, RT2 | — | Torredembarra | 1 | — | — |
| Sant Vicenç de Calders | ● | R2 Sud, R4, R13, R14, R15, R17, RT2 | — | El Vendrell | 2, 4 | 6A | 6 |
| Vilanova i la Geltrú | ● | R2 Sud, R13, R14, R15, R17 | — | Vilanova i la Geltrú | — | 4A | 4 |
| Barcelona Sants* | ● | R1, R2, R2 Nord, R2 Sud, R3, R4, R11, R12, R13, R14, R15, R17, RG1 | Renfe Operadora-operated high-speed and long-distance rail services TGV high-speed rail services Barcelona Metro lines 3 and 5 at Sants Estació station National and international coach services | Barcelona | — | 1 | 1 |
| Barcelona Passeig de Gràcia* | ● | R2, R2 Nord, R2 Sud, R11, R13, R14, R15, R17 | Barcelona Metro lines 2, 3 and 4 | Barcelona | — | 1 | 1 |
| Barcelona Estació de França#* | ● | R2 Sud, R13, R14, R15, R17 | Renfe Operadora-operated long-distance rail services Barcelona Metro line 4 at Barceloneta station | Barcelona | — | 1 | 1 |
