= R4 (Rodalies de Catalunya) =

Railway line in Barcelona, Spain

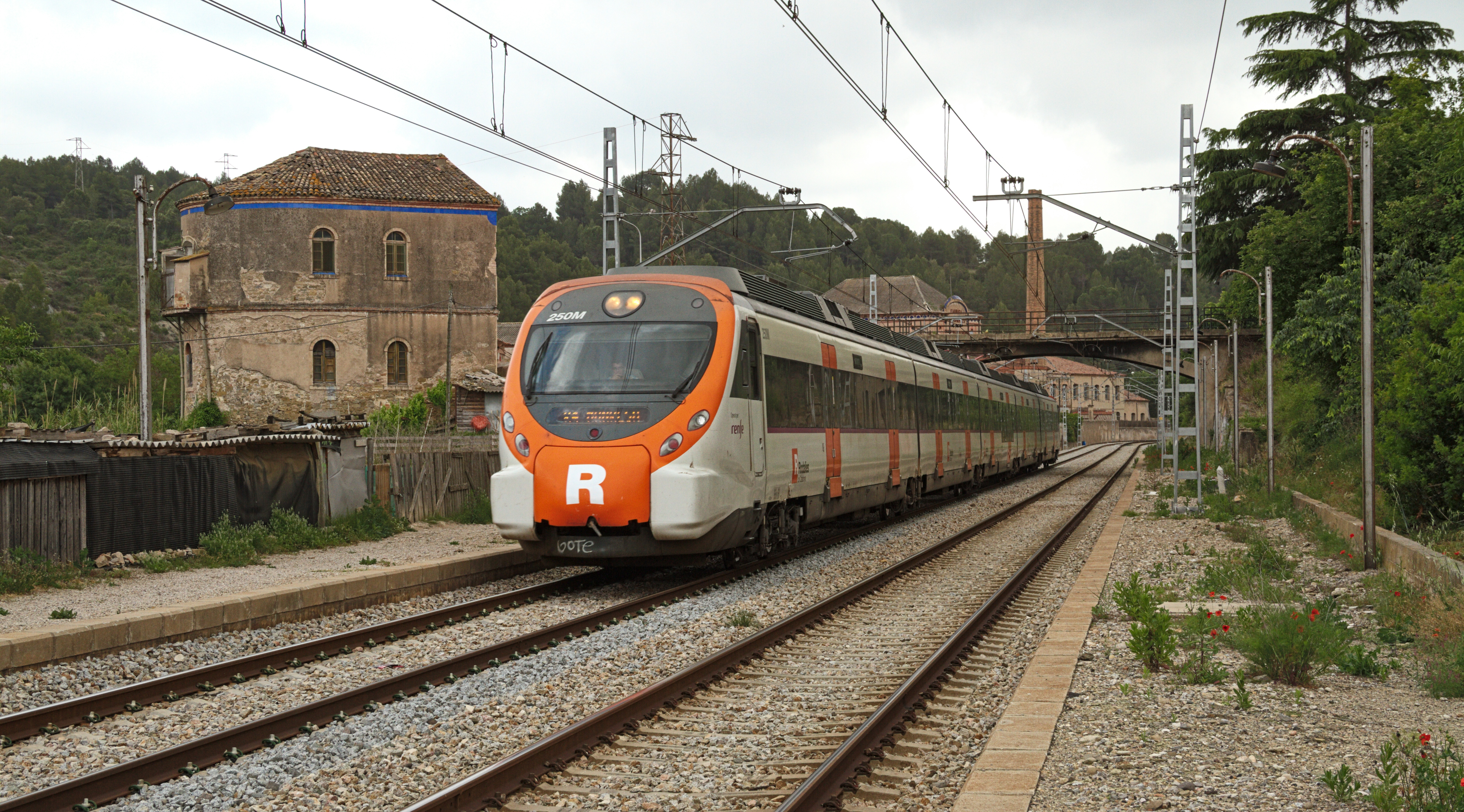
- A Manresa-bound Civia train on a R4 limited service as it passes through the disused Els Comtals railway station, in 2014.

Overview
- Service type: Commuter rail
- Status: Operational
- Locale: Barcelona metropolitan area
- First service: 1989
- Current operator: Renfe Operadora
- Ridership: 105,935 (2008)
- Annual ridership: 29.4 million (2008)

Route
- Termini: Sant Vicenç de Calders; Manresa
- Stops: 40
- Distance travelled: 143 km (89 mi)
- Average journey time: 56 min–2 h 39 min
- Service frequency: Every 8 min–1 h
- Lines used: Lleida–Manresa–Barcelona; Sant Vicenç de Calders–Vilafranca–Barcelona

Technical
- Rolling stock: Civia and 447 Series EMUs
- Track gauge: 1,668 mm (5 ft 5 21/32 in) Iberian gauge
- Electrification: 3,000 V DC overhead lines
- Track owner: Adif

The R4 is a line of Rodalies de Catalunya's Barcelona commuter rail service, operated by Renfe Operadora. It runs northwards from the northern limits of the province of Tarragona to Barcelona, passing through the inland Alt Penedès region. The line then continues towards central Catalonia, describing a U-shaped route through the Barcelona area. According to 2008 data, the line's average weekday ridership is 105,935, the highest on any line of the Barcelona commuter rail service after the R2.

R4 trains use the Meridiana Tunnel in Barcelona, where they share tracks with Rodalies de Catalunya's Barcelona commuter rail service lines R1, R3 and R7, as well as Girona commuter rail service line RG1 and regional rail line R12, calling at Sants, Plaça de Catalunya and Arc de Triomf stations. South of Barcelona, they operate on the Sant Vicenç de Calders–Vilafranca del Penedès–Barcelona railway, using Sant Vicenç de Calders as their southernmost terminus, north of Barcelona they operate on the Lleida–Manresa–Barcelona railway, with no services terminating north of Manresa.

Together with lines R1, R2 and R3, the R4 (then simply numbered line 4) started services in 1989 as one of the first lines of the Cercanías commuter rail system for Barcelona, known as Rodalies Barcelona. In 1995, the branch line to Cerdanyola Universitat railway station opened for passenger service and was incorporated as part of line R4. With the creation of Barcelona commuter rail service line R7 in 2005, the branch line was transferred to the R7. In the long-term future, it is projected that the route of the R4 south of Barcelona will be transferred to the R2, and all its services will terminate at Barcelona–El Prat Airport.

== List of stations ==
The following table lists the name of each station served by line R4 in order from south to north; the station's service pattern offered by R4 trains; the transfers to other Rodalies de Catalunya lines, including both commuter and regional rail services; remarkable transfers to other transport systems; the municipality in which each station is located; and the fare zone each station belongs to according to the Autoritat del Transport Metropolità (ATM Àrea de Barcelona) fare-integrated public transport system and Rodalies de Catalunya's own fare zone system for Barcelona commuter rail service lines.

#	Terminal of a service
*	Transfer station to other transport systems
#*	Transfer station and terminal
●	Station served by all trains running through it
○	Limited service station

Station	Service	Rodalies de Catalunya transfers	Other transfers	Municipality	Fare zone	
Station	Service	Rodalies de Catalunya transfers	Other transfers	Municipality	ATM AdB	Rod
Sant Vicenç de Calders#	●	R2 Sud, R13, R14, R15, R16, RT2	—	El Vendrell	6A	6
El Vendrell	●	RT2	—	El Vendrell	6A	6
L'Arboç	●	RT2	—	L'Arboç	5B	6
Els Monjos	●	—	—	Santa Margarida i els Monjos	4B	5
Vilafranca del Penedès#	●	—	—	Vilafranca del Penedès	4B	5
La Granada	○	—	—	La Granada	4B	5
Lavern-Subirats	○	—	—	Subirats	3B	4
Sant Sadurní d'Anoia	●	—	—	Sant Sadurní d'Anoia	3B	4
Gelida*	●	—	Gelida Funicular	Gelida	3B	4
Martorell#*	●	R8	Baix Llobregat Metro and other commuter rail services	Martorell	3B	3
Castellbisbal	●	R8	—	Castellbisbal	2B	3a
El Papiol	●	—	—	El Papiol	2B	2
Molins de Rei	●	R1	—	Molins de Rei	2B	2
Sant Feliu de Llobregat	●	R1	—	Sant Feliu de Llobregat	1	2
Sant Joan Despí	●	R1	—	Sant Joan Despí	1	1
Cornellà*	●	R1	Barcelona Metro line 5 Trambaix light rail services	Cornellà de Llobregat	1	1
L'Hospitalet de Llobregat#*	●	R1, R3, R12, RG1	Barcelona Metro line 1 at Rambla Just Oliveras station	L'Hospitalet de Llobregat	1	1
Barcelona Sants*	●	R1, R2, R2 Nord, R2 Sud, R3, R11, R12, R13, R14, R15, R16, RG1	Renfe Operadora-operated high-speed and long-distance rail services TGV high-speed rail services Barcelona Metro lines 3 and 5 at Sants Estació station National and international coach services	Barcelona	1	1
Barcelona Plaça de Catalunya*	●	R1, R3, R12, RG1	Barcelona Metro lines 1, 3, 6 and 7 Vallès Metro commuter rail services	Barcelona	1	1
Barcelona Arc de Triomf*	●	R1, R3, R12, RG1	Barcelona Metro line 1 National and international coach services at Estació del Nord	Barcelona	1	1
Barcelona La Sagrera-Meridiana*	●	R3, R12	Barcelona Metro lines 1, 5 and 9/10 (L9 Nord/L10)	Barcelona	1	1
Barcelona Sant Andreu Arenal*	●	R3, R7, R12	Barcelona Metro line 1 at Fabra i Puig station National coach services	Barcelona	1	1
Barcelona Torre del Baró*	●	R3, R7, R12	Barcelona Metro line 11 at Torre Baró – Vallbona station	Barcelona	1	1
Montcada Bifurcació	●	R3, R7, R12	—	Montcada i Reixac	1	1
Montcada i Reixac-Manresa	●	R7, R12	—	Montcada i Reixac	1	1
Montcada i Reixac-Santa Maria	●	R7, R12	—	Montcada i Reixac	1	1
Cerdanyola del Vallès	●	R7, R12	—	Cerdanyola del Vallès	2C	2
Barberà del Vallès	●	R12	—	Barberà del Vallès	2C	2
Sabadell Sud	●	R12	—	Sabadell	2C	3
Sabadell Centre	●	R12	—	Sabadell	2C	3
Sabadell Nord	●	R12	—	Sabadell	2C	3
Terrassa Est	●	R12	—	Terrassa	3C	4
Terrassa#*	●	R12	Vallès Metro commuter rail services	Terrassa	3C	4
Sant Miquel de Gonteres-Viladecavalls	○	—	—	Viladecavalls	3C	4
Viladecavalls	○	—	—	Viladecavalls	3C	4
Vacarisses-Torreblanca	○	—	—	Vacarisses	4E	4
Vacarisses	○	—	—	Vacarisses	4E	5
Castellbell i el Vilar-Monistrol de Montserrat	○	—	—	Castellbell i el Vilar	5E	5
Sant Vicenç de Castellet	●	R12	—	Sant Vicenç de Castellet	5E	5
Manresa#	●	R12	—	Manresa	6D	6

== Incidents ==
On 20 November 2018, a train on this line derailed due to a landslide between the Vacarisses and Vacarisses Torreblanca stations, causing one death and 49 injuries. Another derailment occurred on 8 February 2019 between Sant Vicenç de Castellet and Manresa, killing the driver and injuring several other people.

A train on line R4 crashed into a failed retaining wall on 20 January 2026 near Gelida, killing the train driver and injuring 37 passengers. The incident in Gelida occurred days after a separate crash involving two high-speed trains in the province of Córdoba.

== Bibliography ==
- Julià Sort, Jordi (October 2013). Sagrera i la xarxa ferroviària de Barcelona [Sagrera and Barcelona's railway system] (in Catalan). Barcelona: Viena Edicions. ISBN 978-84-8330-740-3.
