= R3 (Rodalies de Catalunya) =

Commuter rail service in Catalonia, Spain

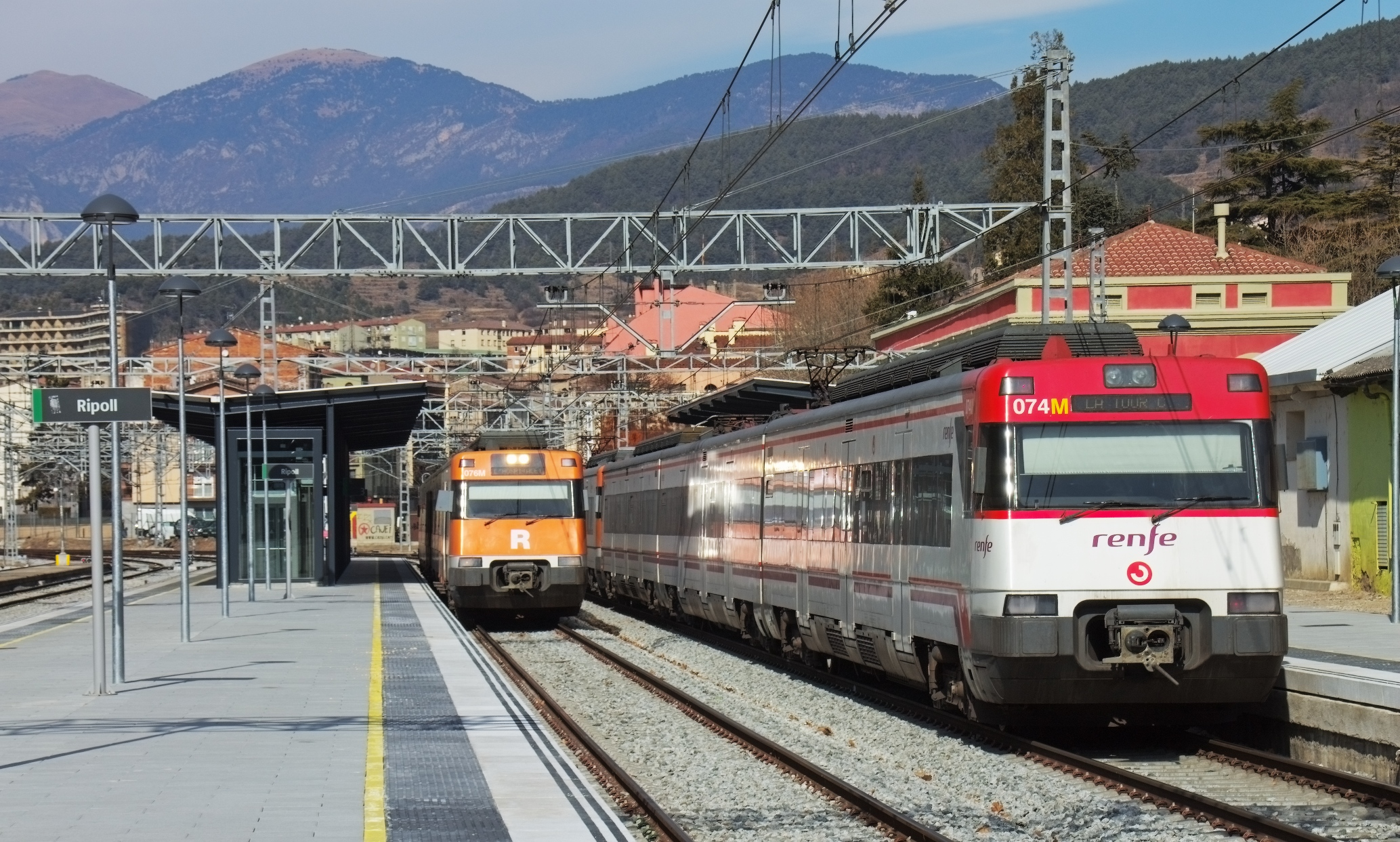
- Two 447 Series trains on R3 services at Ripoll railway station in 2012. The far train is bound for L'Hospitalet de Llobregat, whilst the closer train is bound for Latour-de-Carol-Enveitg.

Overview
- Service type: Commuter rail, regional rail
- Status: Operational
- Locale: Provinces of Barcelona and Girona
- First service: 1989
- Current operator: Renfe Operadora
- Ridership: 22,841 (2008)
- Annual ridership: 6.6 million (2008)
- Website: On Rodalies site

Route
- Termini: L'Hospitalet de Llobregat; Latour-de-Carol-Enveitg
- Stops: 35
- Distance travelled: 165.9 km (103.1 mi)
- Average journey time: 49 min to 3 h 5 min
- Service frequency: Every 20 min to 2 h
- Lines used: Lleida–Manresa–Barcelona; Barcelona–Latour-de-Carol-Enveitg

Technical
- Rolling stock: Civia and 447 Series EMUs
- Track gauge: 1,668 mm (5 ft 5 21/32 in) Iberian gauge
- Electrification: 3,000 V DC overhead lines
- Operating speed: 115 km/h (71 mph) south and 100 km/h (62 mph) north of Vic
- Track owner: Adif
Route map
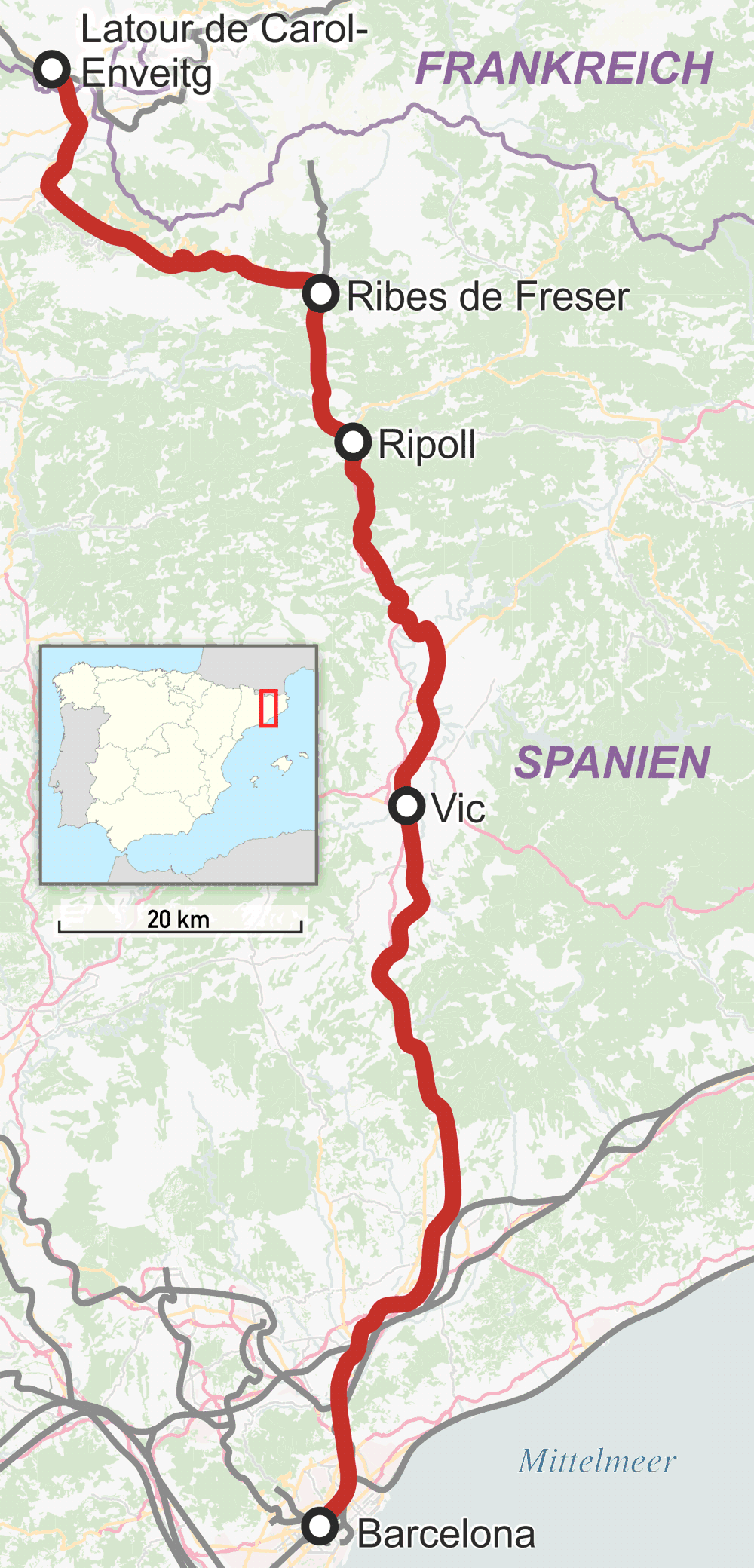

The R3 is a line of Rodalies de Catalunya's Barcelona commuter rail service, operated by Renfe Operadora. It runs northwards from the Barcelona area to the French border town of Latour-de-Carol, passing through the Vallès Oriental, Osona and Ripollès regions. With a total line length of 165.9 kilometres (103.1 mi), it extends notably beyond the limits of the Barcelona metropolitan area, reaching the Pyrenees mountains. According to 2008 data, the line's average weekday ridership is 22,841.

R3 trains use the Meridiana Tunnel in Barcelona, where they share tracks with Barcelona commuter rail service lines R1, R4 and R7, as well as Girona commuter rail service line RG1 and regional rail line R12, calling at Sants, Plaça de Catalunya and Arc de Triomf stations. They run primarily on the Barcelona–Latour-de-Carol-Enveitg railway, using Latour-de-Carol-Enveitg as their northernmost terminus, and L'Hospitalet de Llobregat as its southern one.

Together with lines R1, R2 and R4, the R3 (then simply numbered line 3) started services in 1989 as one of the first lines of the Cercanías commuter rail system for Barcelona, known as Rodalies Barcelona. In 2010, after the administration of the Barcelona commuter rail service was transferred to the Catalan government, the line was extended from its original northern terminus at Vic to Latour-de-Carol-Enveitg. The section north of Vic had not previously been considered part of the Barcelona commuter rail service; designated Ca5, the services running on it were part of Renfe Operadora's regional rail division in Catalonia. In the long-term future, it is projected that the R3 will be rerouted through the Aragó Tunnel in Barcelona. Furthermore, it is planned to be extended southwards to Castelldefels, thanks to the construction of a new branch line from Cornellà de Llobregat.

The R3 is the Barcelona commuter rail service line with the highest number of service incidents, and has been the recipient of much criticism from its users and local authorities. Minor delays occur constantly on the line, most of which can be attributed to the fact that it uses single-track infrastructure for almost all of its length. There have been calls for the conversion of the line's route to double track since the 1990s, especially on the Barcelona–Vic section.

== List of stations ==
The following table lists the name of each station served by line R3 in order from south to north; the station's service pattern offered by R3 trains (excepting the semidirect trains, which only call at Vic, Ripoll and Puigcerdà stations north of Barcelona Sant Andreu Arenal); the transfers to other Rodalies de Catalunya lines, including both commuter and regional rail services; remarkable transfers to other transport systems; the municipality in which each station is located; and the fare zone each station belongs to according to the Autoritat del Transport Metropolità (ATM Àrea de Barcelona) fare-integrated public transport system and Rodalies de Catalunya's own fare zone system for Barcelona commuter rail service lines.

| # | Terminal of a service |
| * | Transfer station to other transport systems |
| #* | Transfer station and terminal |
| ● | Station served by all trains running through it |
| ○ | Limited service station |

| Station | Service | Rodalies de Catalunya transfers | Other transfers | Municipality | Fare zone | |
| Station | Service | Rodalies de Catalunya transfers | Other transfers | Municipality | ATM AdB | Rod |
|---|---|---|---|---|---|---|
| L'Hospitalet de Llobregat#* | ● | R1, R4, R12, RG1 | Barcelona Metro line 1 at Rambla Just Oliveras station | L'Hospitalet de Llobregat | 1 | 1 |
| Barcelona Sants* | ● | R1, R2, R2 Nord, R2 Sud, R4, R11, R12, R13, R14, R15, R16, RG1 | Renfe Operadora-operated high-speed and long-distance rail services TGV high-speed rail services Barcelona Metro lines 3 and 5 at Sants Estació station National and international coach services | Barcelona | 1 | 1 |
| Barcelona Plaça de Catalunya* | ● | R1, R4, R12, RG1 | Barcelona Metro lines 1, 3, 6 and 7 Vallès Metro commuter rail services | Barcelona | 1 | 1 |
| Barcelona Arc de Triomf* | ● | R1, R4, R12, RG1 | Barcelona Metro line 1 National and international coach services at Estació del Nord | Barcelona | 1 | 1 |
| Barcelona La Sagrera-Meridiana* | ● | R4, R12 | Barcelona Metro lines 1, 5 and 9/10 (L9 Nord/L10) | Barcelona | 1 | 1 |
| Barcelona Sant Andreu Arenal* | ● | R4, R7, R12 | Barcelona Metro line 1 at Fabra i Puig station National coach services | Barcelona | 1 | 1 |
| Barcelona Torre del Baró* | ● | R4, R7, R12 | Barcelona Metro line 11 at Torre Baró – Vallbona station | Barcelona | 1 | 1 |
| Montcada Bifurcació | ○ | R4, R7, R12 | — | Montcada i Reixac | 1 | 1 |
| Montcada Ripollet | ○ | — | — | Montcada i Reixac | 1 | 1 |
| Santa Perpètua de Mogoda | ○ | — | — | Santa Perpètua de Mogoda | 2D | 2 |
| Mollet Santa Rosa | ● | — | — | Mollet del Vallès | 2D | 2 |
| Parets del Vallès | ● | — | — | Parets del Vallès | 2D | 3 |
| Granollers-Canovelles# | ● | — | — | Granollers | 3D | 3 |
| Les Franqueses del Vallès | ○ | — | — | Les Franqueses del Vallès | 3D | 3 |
| La Garriga# | ● | — | — | La Garriga | 4F | 4 |
| Figaró | ○ | — | — | Figaró-Montmany | 4F | 4 |
| Sant Martí de Centelles | ○ | — | — | Sant Martí de Centelles | 4F | 4 |
| Centelles | ○ | — | — | Centelles | 5F | 5 |
| Balenyà-Els Hostalets | ○ | — | — | Balenyà | 5F | 5 |
| Balenyà-Tona-Seva | ○ | — | — | Seva | 5F | 5 |
| Vic# | ● | — | — | Vic | 6F | 6 |
| Manlleu | ● | — | — | Manlleu | 6H | 6h |
| Torelló | ● | — | — | Torelló | 6H | 6h |
| Borgonyà | ○ | — | — | Sant Vicenç de Torelló | 6H | 6h |
| Sant Quirze de Besora | ● | — | — | Sant Quirze de Besora | 6H | 6h |
| La Farga de Bebié | ○ | — | — | Montesquiu | — | — |
| Ripoll# | ● | — | — | Ripoll | — | — |
| Campdevànol | ● | — | — | Campdevànol | — | — |
| Ribes de Freser#* | ● | — | Vall de Núria Rack Railway | Ribes de Freser | — | — |
| Planoles | ● | — | — | Planoles | — | — |
| Toses | ● | — | — | Toses | — | — |
| La Molina | ● | — | — | Alp | — | — |
| Urtx-Alp | ● | — | — | Alp | — | — |
| Puigcerdà# | ● | — | — | Puigcerdà | — | — |
| Latour-de-Carol-Enveitg#* | ● | — | Intercités de nuit long-distance night train services TER Occitanie regional rail services | (Station located in Latour-de-Carol, Pyrénées-Orientales, France.) | — | — |

== Bibliography ==
- Julià Sort, Jordi (October 2013). Sagrera i la xarxa ferroviària de Barcelona [Sagrera and Barcelona's railway system] (in Catalan). Barcelona: Viena Edicions. ISBN 978-84-8330-740-3.
- Plan de infraestructuras ferroviarias de cercanías de Barcelona 2008-2015 [2008–2015 Infrastructure Master Plan for the Barcelona Commuter Rail Service] (PDF) (Technical report) (in Spanish). Ministry of Public Works and Transport. Government of Spain. February 2009 – via Associació per a la Promoció del Transport Públic.
