= Lleida Pirineus railway station =

Railway station in Lleida, Catalonia

Coordinates: 41°37′15″N 0°37′58″E

Lleida Pirineus
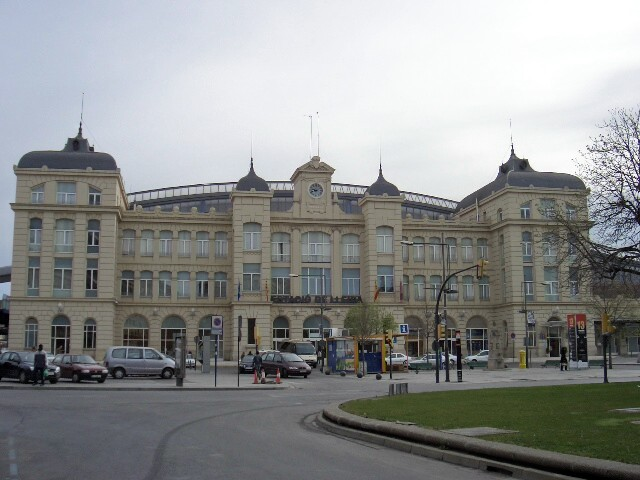
- The main entrance of the station.

General information
- Location: Carrer Príncep de Viana; 43765 Lleida; Spain
- Owner: Adif
- Operator: Renfe Operadora
- Lines: Zaragoza-Tardienta-Lleida (PK 187.4); Madrid–Barcelona (PK 183.6); Lleida–Manresa–Barcelona (PK 0.0); Lleida–La Pobla de Segur (PK 0.0); Madrid–Barcelona (high-speed) (PK 442.1)
- Platforms: 3 island platforms
- Tracks: 9 (2 in standard gauge and 7 in iberian)
- Connections: Local and interurban buses

Construction
- Structure type: At-grade
- Accessible: Yes

Other information
- Station code: 78400

History
- Opened: 3 May 1860

Passengers
- 2018: 1,500,703
Location

Lleida Pirineus ("Lleida Pyrenees") is a railway station serving the city of Lleida in Catalonia, Spain. It is located between the neighbourhoods of Pardinyes and Rambla de Ferran. The first train services in Lleida began in 1860, but the station was not built until 1927, and it did not adopt its current official name until 2003, after renovations. As a transport hub connecting the interior of Spain with the Mediterranean coast, it serves both broad gauge and standard gauge trains, operated by both Adif-Renfe and Ferrocarrils de la Generalitat de Catalunya. It is the terminus of several regional railway services centered in Aragon and Catalonia. It is also one of the stations on the Madrid–Barcelona high-speed rail line, and it was its north-eastern terminus until 2008.

== Name ==
Although Lleida is not located in the Pyrenees mountain range, a part of the Catalan Pyrenees is located within the province of Lleida, and Lleida Pirineus station is the terminal station of Ferrocarrils de la Generalitat de Catalunya (FGC) Lleida - La Pobla de Segur line that connects the city of Lleida with those mountains.

== Rail services ==
Preceding station	Renfe Operadora	Following station
Zaragoza–Delicias towards Madrid Puerta de Atocha	AVE	Camp de Tarragona towards Barcelona Sants
Zaragoza–Delicias towards Madrid Puerta de Atocha	AVE	Camp de Tarragona towards Figueres-Vilafant
Zaragoza–Delicias towards Seville-Santa Justa	AVE	Camp de Tarragona towards Barcelona Sants
Zaragoza–Delicias towards Málaga María Zambrano	AVE	Camp de Tarragona towards Barcelona Sants
Zaragoza–Delicias towards Madrid Puerta de Atocha	Avlo	Camp de Tarragona towards Figueres-Vilafant
Zaragoza–Delicias towards Bilbao Abando	Alvia	Camp de Tarragona towards Barcelona Sants
Zaragoza–Delicias towards Hendaye	Alvia	Camp de Tarragona towards Barcelona Sants
Zaragoza–Delicias towards A Coruña	Alvia	Camp de Tarragona towards Barcelona Sants
Zaragoza–Delicias towards Vigo-Guixar	Alvia	Camp de Tarragona towards Barcelona Sants
Zaragoza–Delicias towards Gijón	Alvia	Camp de Tarragona towards Barcelona Sants
Zaragoza–Delicias towards A Coruña or Vigo-Guixar	Trenhotel Galicia	Camp de Tarragona towards Barcelona Sants
Terminus	Avant	Camp de Tarragona towards Barcelona Sants
Binéfar towards Zaragoza–Delicias	Media Distancia	Terminus
Preceding station	Rodalies de Catalunya	Following station
Terminus	R12	Bell-lloc d'Urgell towards L'Hospitalet de Llobregat
Terminus	R13	Artesa de Lleida towards Barcelona Estació de França
Terminus	R14	Artesa de Lleida towards Barcelona Estació de França
FGC
Terminus	RL1	Alcoletge toward Balaguer
Terminus	RL2	Alcoletge toward La Pobla de Segur

== Other transport ==
A bus station is currently projected immediately next to Lleida-Pirineus to replace the decaying one located in Carrer de Blondel.
