= Passeig de Gràcia station =

Railway station in Barcelona, Spain

Passeig de Gràcia
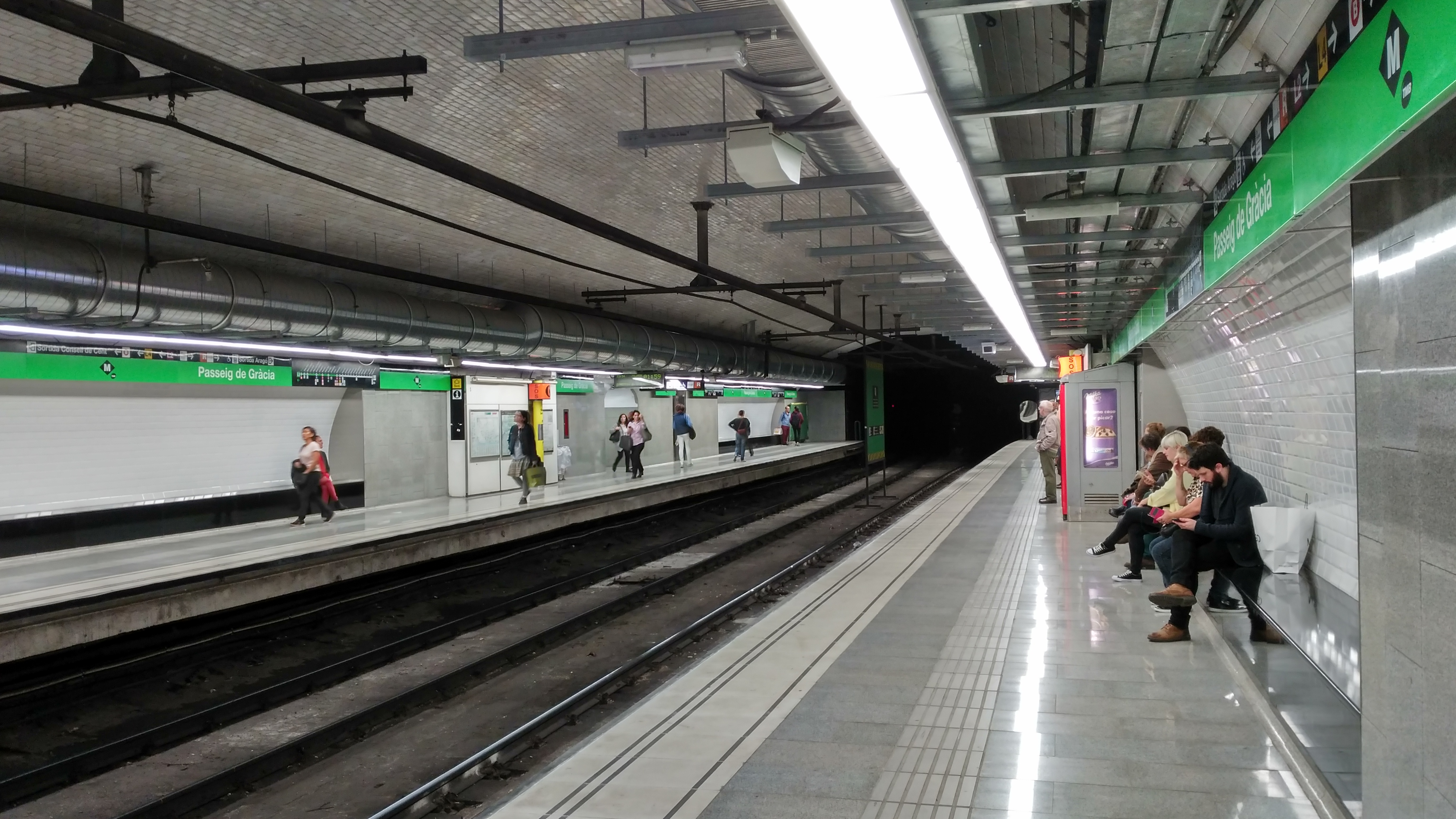
- Barcelona Metro line 3 station after the 2017 renovation works

General information
- Location: Barcelona (Eixample)
- Coordinates: 41°23′24″N 2°10′04″E
- System: Barcelona Metro rapid transit and Rodalies de Catalunya station
- Owner: Adif () and TMB
- Operator: Renfe () and TMB
- Lines: Madrid-Barcelona; Barcelona-Cerbère

Construction
- Structure type: Underground

Other information
- Fare zone: 1 (ATM)

History
- Opened: 1924; 102 years ago; 1959; 67 years ago (); 1973; 53 years ago; 1995; 31 years ago

Passengers
- 2017: 13,387,231 ( )
- Rank: 9

Services
Preceding station	Renfe Operadora	Following station
Barcelona Sants towards Zaragoza–Delicias	Media Distancia	Barcelona Estació de França Terminus
Barcelona Sants towards Valencia Estació del Nord	Media Distancia	Barcelona Estació de França Terminus
Barcelona Sants towards Madrid Chamartín	Media Distancia	Barcelona Estació de França Terminus
Preceding station	Rodalies de Catalunya	Following station
Barcelona Sants towards Castelldefels	R2	Barcelona El Clot-Aragó towards Granollers Centre
Barcelona Sants towards Barcelona–El Prat Airport	R2 Nord	Barcelona El Clot-Aragó towards Maçanet-Massanes
Barcelona Sants towards Sant Vicenç de Calders	R2 Sud	Barcelona Estació de França Terminus
Barcelona Sants Terminus	R11	Barcelona El Clot-Aragó towards Cerbère
Barcelona Sants towards Lleida Pirineus	R13	Barcelona Estació de França Terminus
Barcelona Sants towards Lleida Pirineus	R14	Barcelona Estació de França Terminus
Barcelona Sants towards Riba-roja d'Ebre	R15	Barcelona Estació de França Terminus
Barcelona Sants towards Ulldecona-Alcanar-La Sénia or Tortosa	R16	Barcelona Estació de França Terminus
Barcelona Sants towards Port Aventura	R17	Barcelona Estació de França Terminus
Suspended
Barcelona Sants towards Barcelona–El Prat Airport	R10	Barcelona Estació de França Terminus
Preceding station	Metro	Following station
Universitat towards Paral·lel	L2	Tetuan towards Badalona Pompeu Fabra
Catalunya towards Zona Universitària	L3	Diagonal towards Trinitat Nova
Girona towards Trinitat Nova	L4	Urquinaona towards La Pau
Location
- Location within Barcelona

Passeig de Gràcia station (Catalan pronunciation: [pəˈsɛdʒ də ˈgɾasi.ə]) is an underground railway and metro station in Barcelona located under Passeig de Gràcia, in Eixample district. It is one of the Barcelona's busiest railway stations and an important station on the Barcelona Metro network, being the seventh most used station in 2024. It is served by Rodalies de Catalunya suburban railway lines R2 and regional lines R11, R13, R14, R15 and R16, and it is also served by TMB-operated Barcelona Metro lines L2, L3 and L4.

The station includes an artwork entitled Ballarins nus by Angel Orensanz.

== History ==
The first railway station that existed in Passeig de Gràcia was built in 1902. The original station was not underground and lines were linked directly with the lines to Girona and Tarragona. In 1950s it was decided to build a new underground station and cover all the tracks along Aragó street. The work started in 1954 and the station was finished in 1959 as part of the Aragó Tunnel. It is planned to reform the railway station completely to make it more accessible and to improve its aspect.

== Services ==
=== Rodalies de Catalunya ===
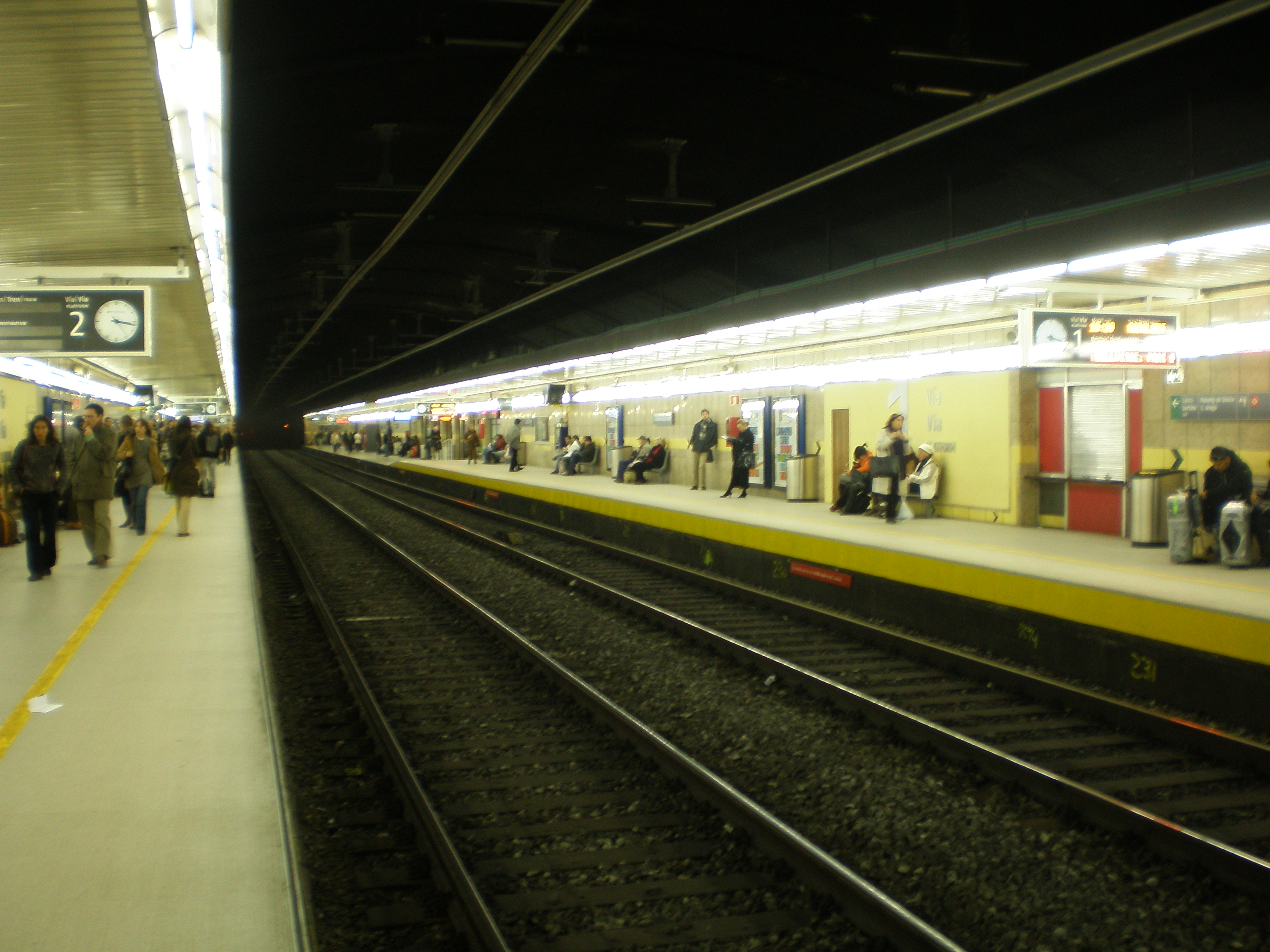
View of the railway station before the renovation works

Rodalies de Catalunya railway station is situated under Aragó street and between Passeig de Gràcia and Roger de Llúria street. The station has four accesses from the street and all of them go to the main hall where it is possible to connect directly with Barcelona Metro line 3. The main hall has some ticket offices, ticket vending machines and a kiosk. The trains run on the lower level where there are two platforms, each one equipped with a café-bar.

=== Barcelona Metro ===
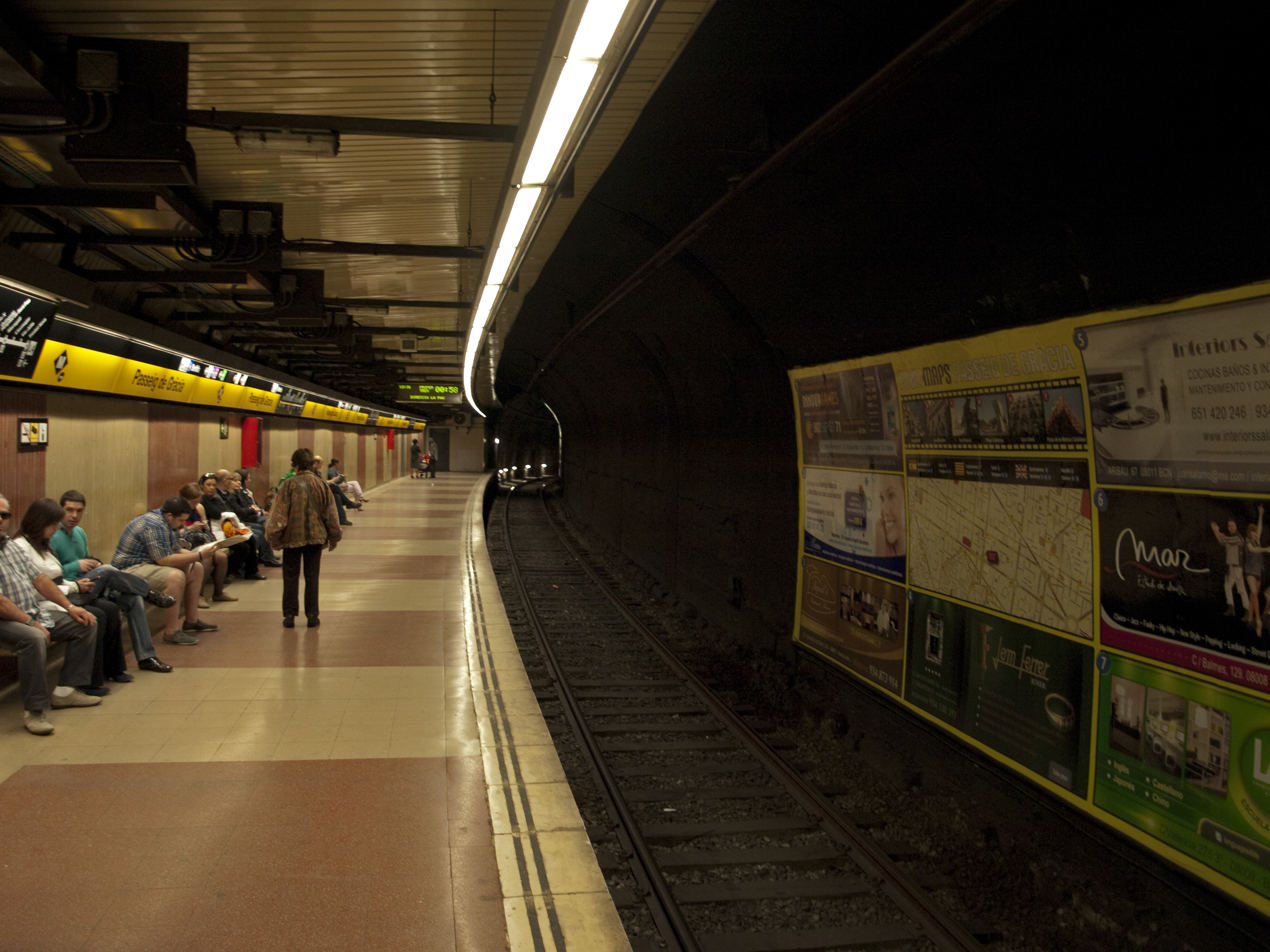
Line L4 platform, direction La Pau

- Barcelona Metro line 2 station was opened in 1995, with the opening of the line between Sant Antoni and Sagrada Família. It is located under Gran Via de les Corts Catalanes and near Passeig de Gràcia. Line 2 station has two accesses each one equipped with many ticket vending machines. On the lower there are two platforms, each one separated from the other like London Underground tube stations. It is directly connected to Barcelona Metro line 4 station and to Barcelona Metro line 3 and Rodalies de Catalunya railway station through a long corridor.

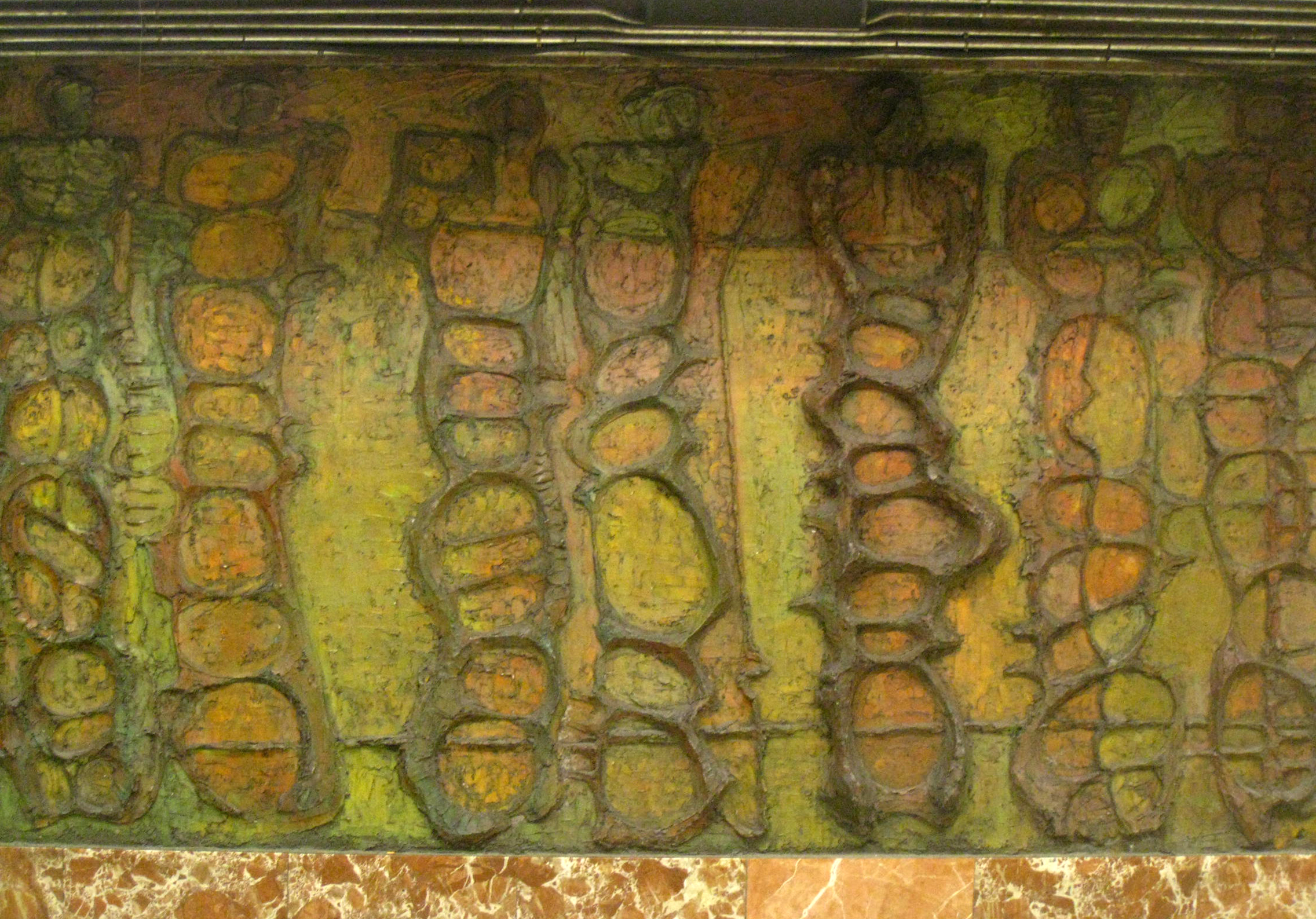
Artwork by Angel Orensanz on a platform at Passeig de Gràcia

- Barcelona Metro line 3 station was opened in 1924 with the opening of the line between Catalunya and Lesseps, the first metropolitan railway in the city. The station is located under Passeig de Gràcia between Consell de Cent and Aragó streets and has two halls, one at each side of the station. It is directly connected to the railway station and to line 2 and line 4 through a 250 metres-long corridor.
- Barcelona Metro line 4 station was opened in 1973 with the opening of the line between Urquinaona and Joanic. The station is located under Passeig de Gràcia, between Gran Via and Diputació street and has an only hall situated in the south part of the station. The hall has a head office and some ticket vending machines. It is connected to line 3 station through the long corridor. On the lower level there are two platforms, each one separated from the other and connected to line 2 station.
