= Bellvitge railway station =

Railway station in Barcelona, Spain

Bellvitge
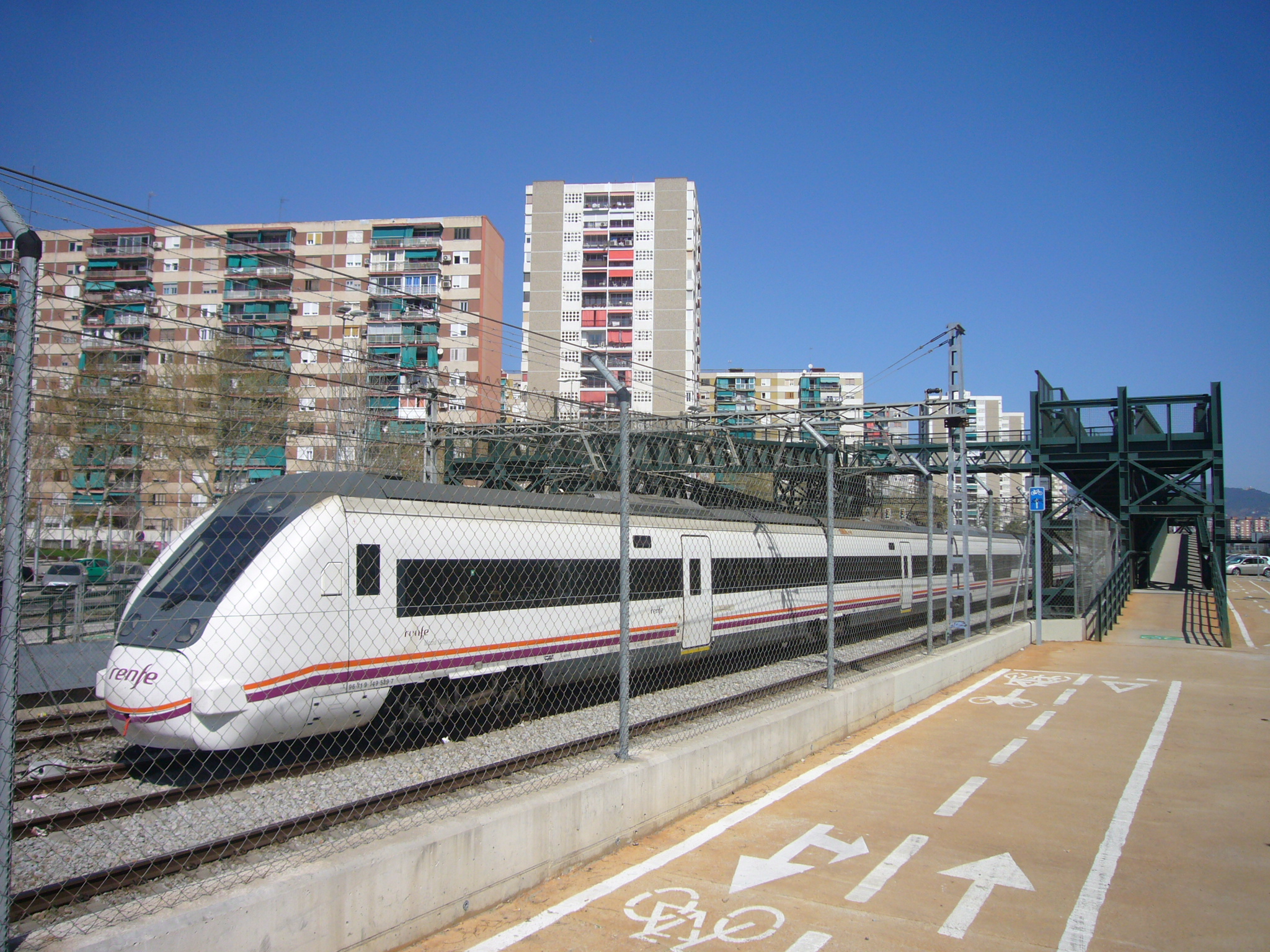
- A Renfe Operadora 449 Series train at the station.

General information
- Location: Avinguda d'Amèrica; 08907 L'Hospitalet de Llobregat; Catalonia; Spain
- Coordinates: 41°21′13.1″N 2°06′55.2″E
- System: Rodalies de Catalunya commuter and regional rail station
- Owner: Adif
- Operator: Renfe Operadora
- Line: Madrid–Barcelona (PK 671.9)
- Platforms: 1 side platform; 1 island platform
- Tracks: 3
- Connections: Llobregat–Anoia Line: at Gornal; Urban buses

Construction
- Structure type: At-grade
- Parking: A parking lot is located at each side of the station.
- Accessible: No

Other information
- Station code: 71708
- Fare zone: 1 (ATM Àrea de Barcelona and Rodalies de Catalunya's Barcelona commuter rail service)

History
- Opened: 10 March 1977

Services
Preceding station	Rodalies de Catalunya	Following station
El Prat de Llobregat towards Castelldefels	R2	Barcelona Sants towards Granollers Centre
El Prat de Llobregat towards Barcelona–El Prat Airport	R2 Nord	Barcelona Sants towards Maçanet-Massanes
El Prat de Llobregat towards Sant Vicenç de Calders	R2 Sud	Barcelona Sants towards Barcelona Estació de França
El Prat de Llobregat towards Riba-roja d'Ebre	R15	Barcelona Sants towards Barcelona Estació de França
Suspended
El Prat de Llobregat towards Barcelona–El Prat Airport	R10	Barcelona Sants towards Barcelona Estació de França
Location
- Location within Barcelona

Bellvitge is a Rodalies de Catalunya commuter rail station serving the neighborhood of the same name, in the L'Hospitalet de Llobregat municipality, to the south-west of Barcelona, in Catalonia, Spain. It is on the conventional Madrid–Barcelona railway, between El Prat de Llobregat and Barcelona Sants, and is served by all trains on Barcelona commuter rail service lines R2 and R2 Nord, as well as some R2 Sud trains. Some trains on regional line R15 also call at the station.

Opened on 10 March 1977, the current at-grade station is projected to be put underground together with the rest of the conventional Madrid–Barcelona railway on its way through L'Hospitalet de Llobregat in the coming years. In October 2007, the construction works of the Madrid–Barcelona high-speed rail line in Barcelona's southern access, which runs through an underground route parallel to the conventional line in L'Hospitalet de Llobregat, caused a partial sudden collapse of one of the station's platforms. Due to precedent ground subsidence in the area, the station was shut down as a preventive measure at the moment it occurred, so that there were neither fatalities nor injured people.

Gornal station, served by Barcelona Metro line 8 and several commuter rail services, is located adjacent to Bellvitge station, on the east side of it, allowing for street-level transfers between the two stations.

Rodalies de Catalunya's Bellvitge station should not be confused with the Barcelona Metro line 1 station of the same name, which is some 750 metres (2,460 ft) to the west.
