= El Prat de Llobregat railway station =

Railway station in El Prat de Llobregat, Spain

El Prat de Llobregat El Prat Estació
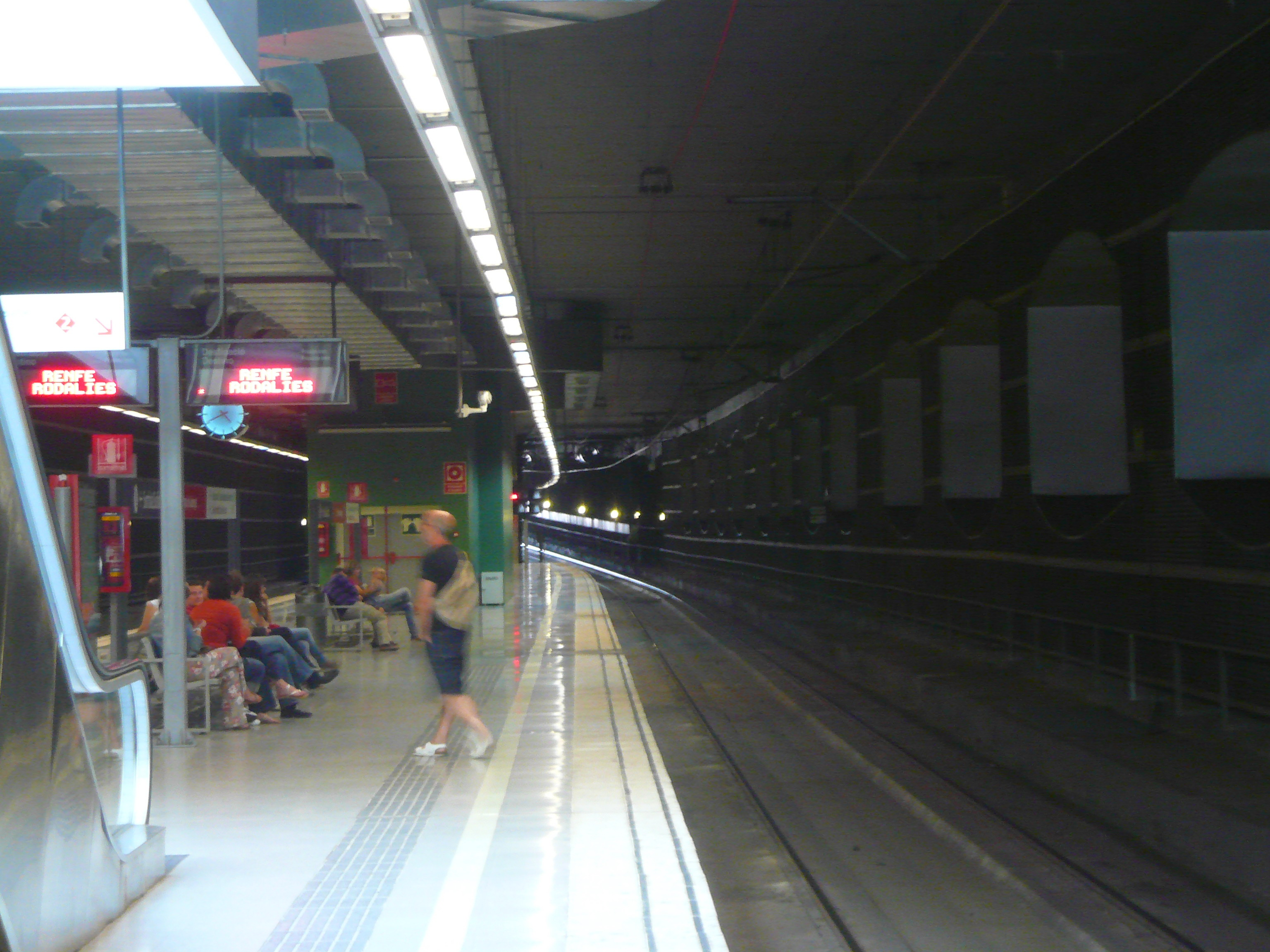
- The southernmost island platform of the Rodalies de Catalunya station in 2011.

General information
- Location: Carrer Dr. Soler i Torrents; 08820 El Prat de Llobregat; Catalonia; Spain
- Coordinates: 41°19′52.68″N 2°5′24.79″E
- System: Rodalies de Catalunya commuter and regional rail station; TMB rapid transit station
- Owner: Adif Alta Velocidad (Madrid–Barcelona HSR); Adif (Rodalies de Catalunya); Ifercat (Barcelona Metro)
- Operator: Renfe Operadora (Rodalies de Catalunya); Transports Metropolitans de Barcelona (TMB; Barcelona Metro)
- Lines: Madrid–Barcelona (high-speed) (PK 612.9); Madrid–Barcelona (PK 670.0); El Prat de Llobregat–Airport (PK 0.0); Barcelona Metro line 9
- Platforms: 2 island platforms (Rodalies de Catalunya); 2 side platforms (Madrid–Barcelona HSR; unused); 2 side platforms (Barcelona Metro)
- Tracks: 4 (Rodalies de Catalunya); 4 (Madrid–Barcelona HSR; 2 for non-stopping trains); 2 (Barcelona Metro)
- Connections: Local buses

Construction
- Structure type: Underground
- Accessible: Both the Rodalies de Catalunya and the Barcelona Metro stations are fully disabled-accessible.

Other information
- Station code: 04110 (Madrid–Barcelona HSR); 71707 (Rodalies de Catalunya); 907 (Barcelona Metro)
- Fare zone: 1 (ATM Àrea de Barcelona and Rodalies de Catalunya's Barcelona commuter rail service)

History
- Opened: 29 December 1881; 144 years ago (Rodalies de Catalunya); 12 February 2016; 10 years ago (Barcelona Metro)

Services
Preceding station	Rodalies de Catalunya	Following station
Viladecans towards Castelldefels	R2	Bellvitge towards Granollers Centre
Barcelona–El Prat Airport Terminus	R2 Nord	Bellvitge towards Maçanet-Massanes
Viladecans towards Sant Vicenç de Calders	R2 Sud	Bellvitge towards Barcelona Estació de França
Viladecans towards Riba-roja d'Ebre	R15	Bellvitge towards Barcelona Estació de França
Suspended
Barcelona–El Prat Airport Terminus	R10	Bellvitge towards Barcelona Estació de França
Preceding station	Metro	Following station
Cèntric towards Aeroport T1	L9 Sud	Les Moreres towards Zona Universitària
Projected
Terminus	L1	Hospital de Bellvitge towards Badalona Est
Cèntric towards Airport T1	L2	La Ribera towards Badalona Pompeu Fabra
Cèntric towards Airport T1	L9	La Ribera towards Can Zam
Location

El Prat de Llobregat (Catalan: [əl ˈpɾad də ʎuβɾəˈɣat]) or El Prat Estació (Catalan: [əl ˈpɾat əstəsiˈo]) is both a Rodalies de Catalunya and a Barcelona Metro station serving the suburb of El Prat de Llobregat, to the south-west of Barcelona, in Catalonia, Spain. It is on the conventional Madrid–Barcelona railway and is served by all trains on Barcelona commuter rail service lines R2 and R2 Nord, as well as some R2 Sud trains. Some trains on regional line R15 also call at the station. The metro station is on the airport branch of Barcelona Metro line 9 (L9) and is operated by Transports Metropolitans de Barcelona (TMB).
