= El Clot railway station =

Spanish railway station

Coordinates: 41.408682°N 2.186899°E

El Clot
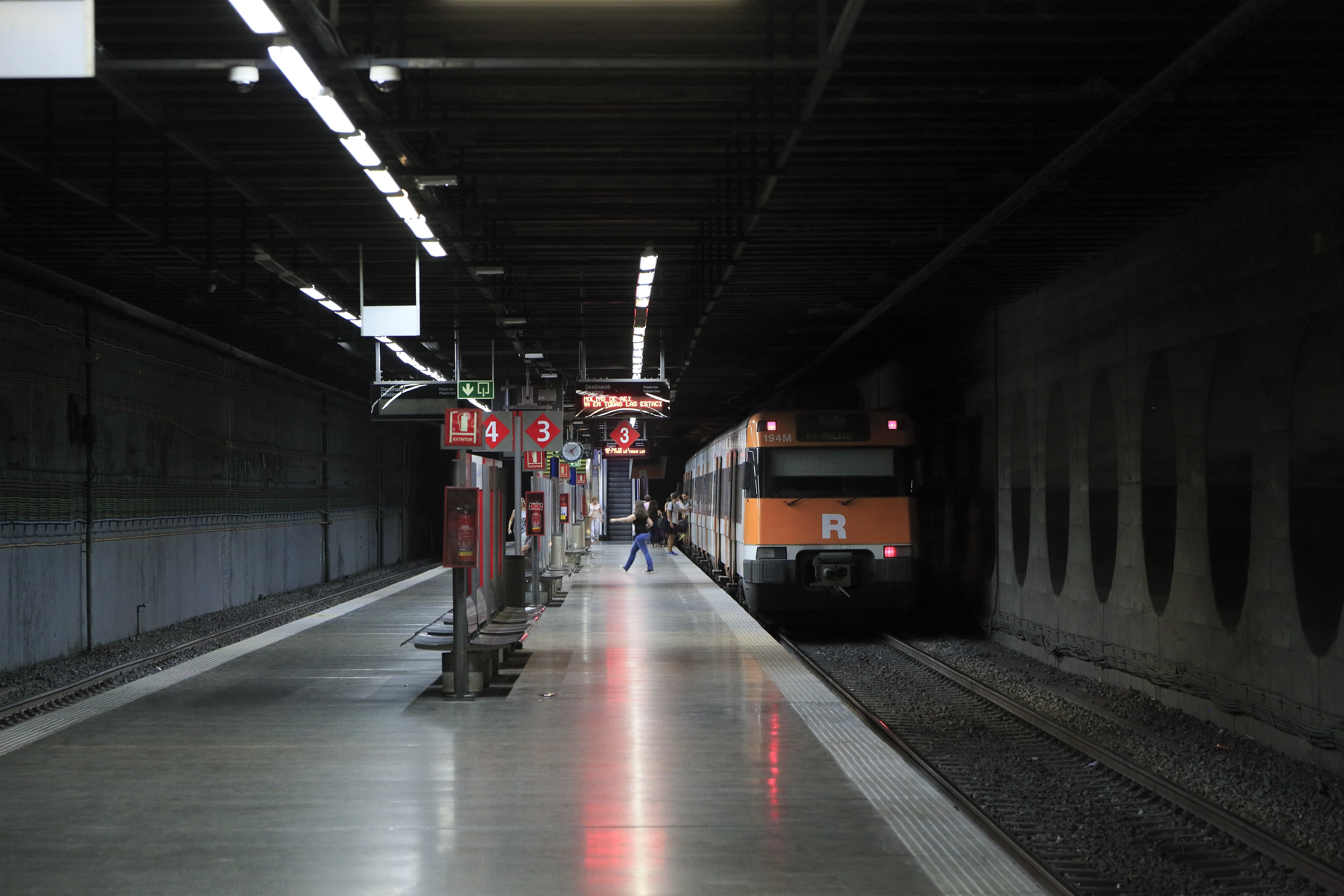
- A 447 Series train at the station in 2015.

General information
- Location: Carrer d'Aragó & Avinguda Meridiana, Barcelona; Catalonia; Spain
- System: Rodalies de Catalunya commuter and regional rail station
- Owner: Adif
- Operator: Renfe Operadora
- Lines: Barcelona-Cerbère (PK 2.8); Barcelona–Mataró–Maçanet-Massanes (PK 1.6)
- Platforms: 2 island platforms
- Tracks: 4
- Connections: Barcelona Metro lines 1 and 2 at Clot station; Urban buses

Construction
- Structure type: At grade

Other information
- Fare zone: 1 (ATM Àrea de Barcelona and Rodalies de Catalunya's Barcelona commuter rail service)

Services
Preceding station	Rodalies de Catalunya	Following station
Barcelona Arc de Triomf towards Molins de Rei	R1	Sant Adrià de Besòs towards Maçanet-Massanes
Barcelona Passeig de Gràcia towards Castelldefels	R2	Barcelona Sant Andreu towards Granollers Centre
Barcelona Passeig de Gràcia towards Barcelona–El Prat Airport	R2 Nord	Barcelona Sant Andreu towards Maçanet-Massanes
Barcelona Arc de Triomf towards L'Hospitalet de Llobregat	RG1	Sant Adrià de Besòs towards Portbou
Barcelona Passeig de Gràcia towards Barcelona Sants	R11	Barcelona Sant Andreu towards Cerbère
Location

Barcelona El Clot is a Rodalies de Catalunya station in El Camp de l'Arpa del Clot, in the Sant Martí district of Barcelona in Catalonia, Spain. It is served by Barcelona commuter rail service lines R1, R2 and R2 Nord, as well as Girona commuter rail service line RG1 and regional line R11. Passengers can commute here to Barcelona Metro station Clot. Like its metro counterpart, the station is completely underground, under Carrer d'Aragó and Avinguda Meridiana.

The station was previously known as El Clot-Aragó, changing to the current name in order to simplify the network and avoid cases where two stations with interchange had different names. The change was announced on 9 May 2022 and took effect from 17 July 2023.

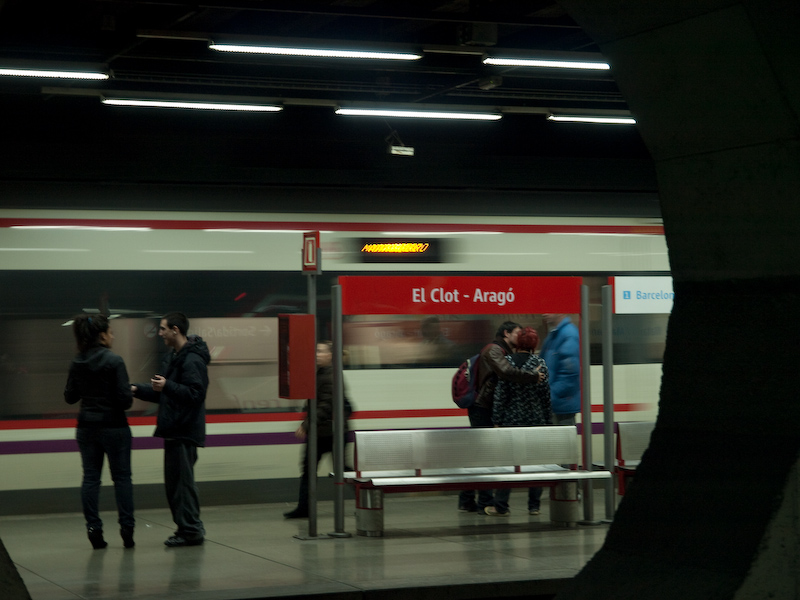
View of one of the station's platforms
