= Sant Andreu railway station =

Railway station in Barcelona, Spain

Coordinates: 41.4361°N 2.1932°E

Sant Andreu
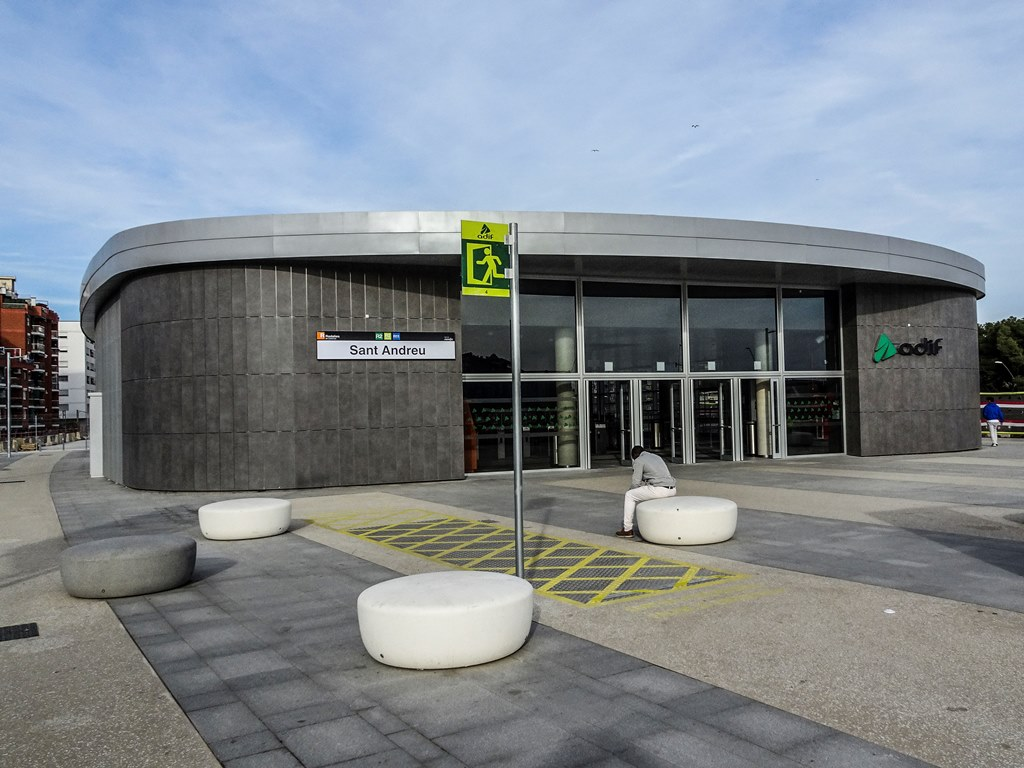
- View of the new Sant Andreu railway station

General information
- Location: Sant Andreu, Barcelona; Catalonia; Spain
- System: Rodalies de Catalunya commuter and regional rail station
- Owner: Adif
- Operator: Renfe Operadora
- Line: Barcelona-Cerbère (PK 6.8)
- Tracks: 2
- Connections: Barcelona Metro line 1 at Sant Andreu station; Urban buses

Construction
- Structure type: At grade

Other information
- Fare zone: 1 (ATM Àrea de Barcelona and Rodalies de Catalunya's Barcelona commuter rail service)

Services
Preceding station	Rodalies de Catalunya	Following station
El Clot towards Castelldefels	R2	Montcada i Reixac towards Granollers Centre
El Clot towards Barcelona–El Prat Airport	R2 Nord	Montcada i Reixac towards Maçanet-Massanes
El Clot towards Barcelona Sants	R11	Granollers Centre towards Cerbère
Location

Sant Andreu (also known as Barcelona-Sant Andreu; previously Sant Andreu Comtal) is a Rodalies de Catalunya station in the Sant Andreu district of Barcelona. It is served by Barcelona commuter rail service lines R2 and R2 Nord, as well as regional line R11. Passengers can also commute here to Barcelona Metro line 1 station Sant Andreu. It is located completely over ground.

Sant Andreu Comtal railway station used to have up to 10 rail tracks, which were decreased to 2 in 2010 due to the construction works for building the new Sagrera railway station. Local and regional services which previously terminated here were diverted to Estació de França in 2009 in preparation for these changes.

In December 3, 2022, Sant Andreu Comtal was no longer providing any commuter rail services and has been replaced by the neighbouring Sant Andreu railway station.

== See also ==
- Fabra i Puig railway station
