= R10 =

R10 can refer to:

- HMS Indefatigable (R10)
- Radial Road 10 or R-10, an arterial road of Manila, Philippines
- R10 (New York City Subway car)
- R10: Flammable, a risk phrase
- Audi R10 TDI, a sports prototype racing car built by Audi
- Expressway R10, an expressway in Czech Republic
- Neman R-10, a World War II Russian bomber
- USS R-10 (SS-87), a 1919 R-class coastal and harbor defense submarine of the United States Navy
- Kellett XR-10, an American helicopter
- R10 (Rodalies de Catalunya), a former commuter rail line in Barcelona, Catalonia, Spain
- Canon EOS R10, a 2022 mirrorless camera

and also:

- a nickname for footballer Ronaldinho
- The R10 series of preferred numbers
- Carbon tetrachloride (R-10), a solvent
- The R10 battery, an old IEC 1.5 V battery size with dimensions 20×36 mm
- receptor 10, the tenth in line of a series of cellular receptors, generally at the end of an acronym
