= R8 (Rodalies de Catalunya) =

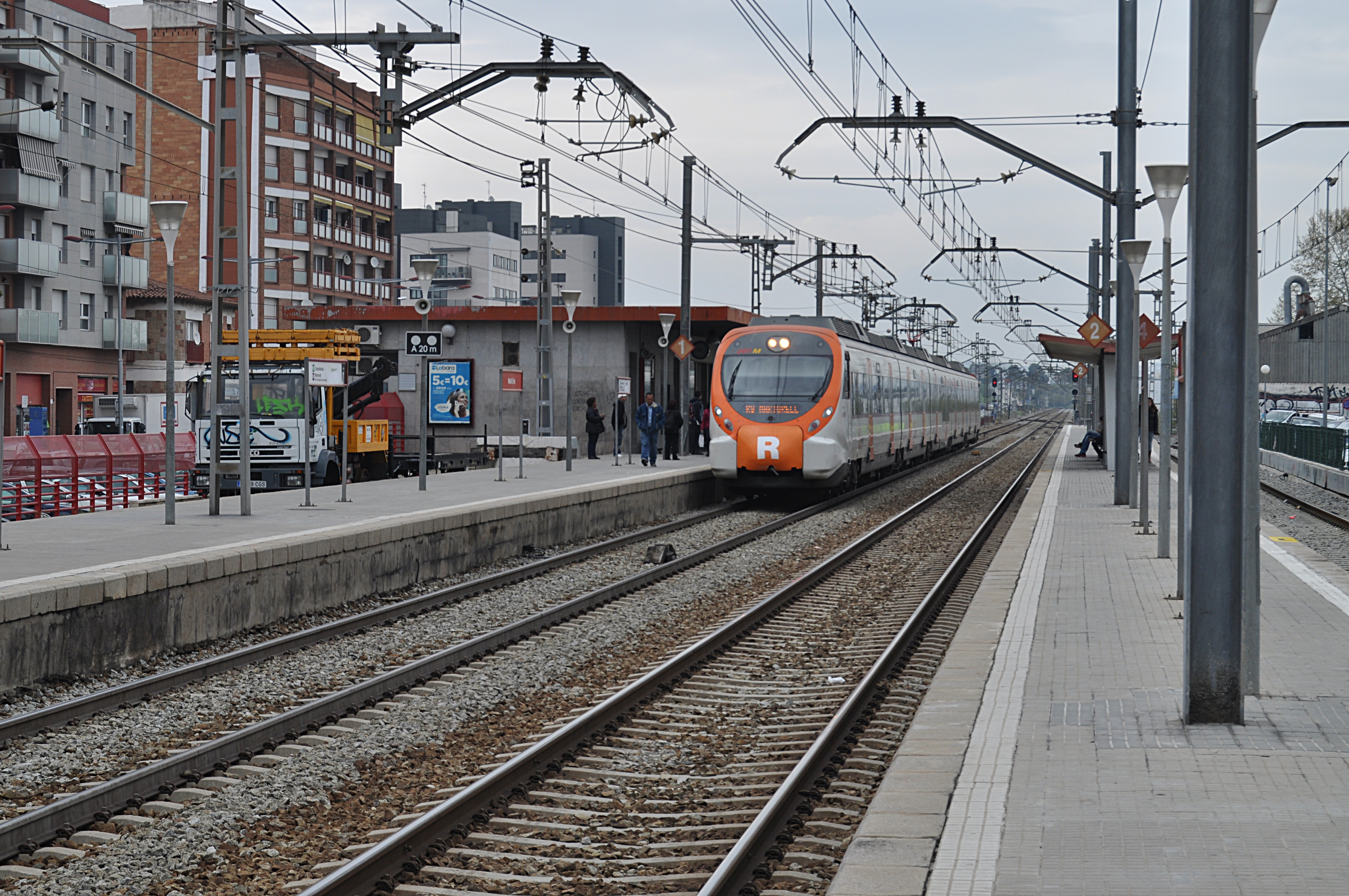
- A Civia train on a Martorell-bound R8 service at Mollet-Sant Fost railway station, in 2013.

Overview
- Service type: Commuter rail
- Status: Operational
- Locale: Barcelona metropolitan area
- First service: 26 June 2011
- Current operator(s): Renfe Operadora

Route
- Termini: Martorell; Granollers Centre
- Stops: 8
- Distance travelled: 40 km (25 mi)
- Average journey time: 19 min
- Service frequency: Hourly
- Line(s) used: Sant Vicenç de Calders–Vilafranca del Penedès–Barcelona; Castellbisbal–Mollet-Sant Fost; Barcelona–Cerbère

Technical
- Rolling stock: Civia EMUs
- Track gauge: 1,668 mm (5 ft 5 21/32 in) Iberian gauge
- Electrification: 3,000 V DC overhead lines
- Track owner(s): Adif

The R8 is a line of Rodalies de Catalunya's Barcelona commuter rail service, operated by Renfe Operadora. It runs hourly between Martorell and Granollers across the Vallès Occidental region, spanning 40 kilometres (25 mi) and eight stations. The R8 primarily uses the Castellbisbal–Mollet-Sant Fost railway, as well as the Sant Vicenç de Calders–Vilafranca del Penedès–Barcelona and Barcelona–Cerbère railways on its southern and northern ends, respectively. It is currently the only line of the Barcelona commuter rail service entirely bypassing Barcelona. The trains operating on the line are Civia electrical multiple units (EMU).

R8 trains started operating on 26 June 2011 after a service restructuring affecting the Barcelona commuter rail service. The R7, which had previously run between Martorell and L'Hospitalet de Llobregat stations via Vallès Occidental and Barcelona, was shortened and started operating between Cerdanyola Universitat and Barcelona Sant Andreu Arenal stations. The newly created R8 took over the former route of line R7 between Martorell and Cerdanyola Universitat stations, then continuing eastwards to Granollers Centre railway station, without entering Barcelona.

== List of stations ==
The following table lists the name of each station served by line R8 in order from west to east; the station's service pattern offered by R8 trains; the transfers to other Rodalies de Catalunya lines, including both commuter and regional rail services; remarkable transfers to other transport systems; the municipality in which each station is located; and the fare zone each station belongs to according to the Autoritat del Transport Metropolità (ATM Àrea de Barcelona) fare-integrated public transport system and Rodalies de Catalunya's own fare zone system for Barcelona commuter rail service lines.

| # | Terminal of a service |
| * | Transfer station to other transport systems |
| #* | Transfer station and terminal |
| ● | Station served by all trains running through it |
| ○ | Limited service station |

| Station | Service | Rodalies de Catalunya transfers | Other transfers | Municipality | Fare zone | |
| Station | Service | Rodalies de Catalunya transfers | Other transfers | Municipality | ATM AdB | Rod |
|---|---|---|---|---|---|---|
| Martorell#* | ● | R4 | Baix Llobregat Metro and other commuter rail services | Martorell | 3B | 3 |
| Castellbisbal | ● | R4 | — | Castellbisbal | 2B | 3a |
| Rubí | ● | — | — | Rubí | 2C | 3 |
| Sant Cugat del Vallès* | ● | — | Vallès Metro commuter rail services at Volpelleres station | Sant Cugat del Vallès | 2C | 3 |
| Cerdanyola Universitat | ● | R7 | — | Cerdanyola del Vallès | 2C | 3 |
| Mollet-Sant Fost | ● | R2, R2 Nord | — | Mollet del Vallès | 2D | 2 |
| Montmeló | ● | R2, R2 Nord | — | Montmeló | 2D | 2 |
| Granollers Centre# | ● | R2, R2 Nord, R11 | — | Granollers | 3D | 3 |
