= R2 (Rodalies de Catalunya) =

Commuter rail line in Barcelona, Spain

R2 R2 Nord R2 Sud

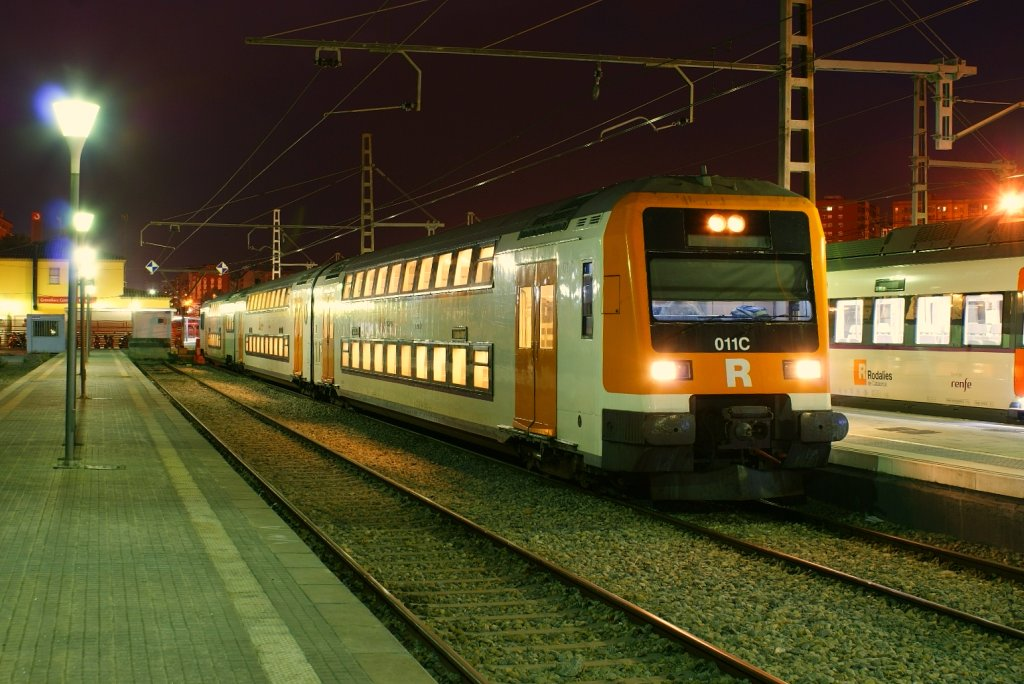
- A 451 Series train on a R2 service at Granollers Centre railway station in 2011.

Overview
- Service type: Commuter rail
- Status: Operational
- Locale: Barcelona metropolitan area
- First service: 1989
- Current operator(s): Renfe Operadora
- Ridership: 125,948 (2008)
- Annual ridership: 33.6 million (2016)

Route
- Termini: Sant Vicenç de Calders (R2 Sud), Castelldefels (R2), Barcelona–El Prat Airport (R2 Nord); Barcelona Estació de França (R2 Sud), Granollers Centre (R2), Maçanet-Massanes (R2 Nord)
- Stops: 34
- Distance travelled: 133 km (83 mi)
- Average journey time: 59 min–1 h 38 min
- Service frequency: Every 8–60 min
- Line(s) used: Madrid–Barcelona; Barcelona–El Prat Airport rail link; Barcelona–Cerbère

Technical
- Rolling stock: Civia, 447 Series, 450 Series and 451 Series EMUs
- Track gauge: 1,668 mm (5 ft 5 21/32 in) Iberian gauge
- Electrification: 3,000 V DC overhead lines
- Track owner(s): Adif

The R2 is a line of Rodalies de Catalunya's Barcelona commuter rail service, operated by Renfe Operadora and the Generalitat de Catalunya government. It is a major north–south axis in the Barcelona metropolitan area, running from the southern limits of the province of Girona to the northern limits of the province of Tarragona, via Barcelona. North of Barcelona, the line uses the Barcelona–Cerbère railway, running inland through the Vallès Oriental region. South of Barcelona, it uses the conventional Madrid–Barcelona railway, running along the coast through the Garraf region. The R2 had an annual ridership of 33.6 million in 2016, achieving an average weekday ridership of 125,948 according to 2008 data, which makes it the busiest line of the Barcelona commuter rail service.

All R2 trains use the Aragó Tunnel in Barcelona, where they share tracks with Rodalies de Catalunya's regional rail lines R11, R13, R14, R15 and R16, calling at Sants and Passeig de Gràcia stations. The line originally had no branches, with Sant Vicenç de Calders and Maçanet-Massanes serving as its only southernmost and northernmost terminus, respectively. In 2009, it took over the service offered by Barcelona commuter rail service line R10, incorporating the branch lines to Barcelona–El Prat Airport and Barcelona's Estació de França. A new line scheme has been in operation ever since; the services starting or terminating at the airport run north towards Maçanet-Massanes and are designated R2 Nord ("North"), whilst the ones starting or terminating at Estació de França run south towards Sant Vicenç de Calders and are designated R2 Sud ("South"). The rest of the services, simply designated R2, operate between Castelldefels and Granollers Centre.

Together with lines R1, R3 and R4, the R2 (then simply numbered line 2) started services in 1989 as one of the first lines of the Cercanías commuter rail system for Barcelona, known as Rodalies Barcelona. In the long-term future, it is projected to take over the R4 south of Barcelona, connecting the inland regions of the Barcelona metropolitan area.

== History ==
The predecessor of the modern-day R2 started operating in 1989 as line 2 of Rodalies Barcelona, the Cercanías commuter rail system for the Barcelona area, created in the same year. Since its creation until 2009, the R2 had preserved its original line scheme with no branch lines, using only Maçanet-Massanes and Sant Vicenç de Calders stations as its northern and southern terminus, respectively. Due to the construction works of the new Sagrera railway station in Barcelona and the urban renewal project associated with it, the operational capacity at Sant Andreu Comtal railway station and its surroundings was restricted. Consequently, several rail services were modified, with Rodalies de Catalunya's Barcelona commuter rail service lines R2 and R10 as the most affected. On 31 January 2009, the R10, which linked Barcelona–El Prat Airport to Barcelona's Estació de França, suspended services. The R2 then took over the service offered by the R10, incorporating the branch lines to the airport and Estació de França, and a new line scheme came into service. The R10 was initially scheduled to resume services two years later.

== Accidents and incidents ==
- On 23 June 2010, twelve people were killed and fourteen were injured when an express train ran into them as they were crossing the line at Platja de Castelldefels station.
- On 28 July 2017, fifty-four people were injured when a R2 Sud train coming from Sant Vicenç de Calders collided with a buffer stop at Barcelona's Estació de França terminus.

== Infrastructure ==
Like the rest of Rodalies de Catalunya lines, the R2 runs on the Iberian gauge mainline railway system, which is owned by Adif, an agency of the Spanish government. All of the railway lines carrying Rodalies de Catalunya services are electrified at 3,000 volts (V) direct current (DC) using overhead lines. The R2 operates on a total line length of 133 kilometres (83 mi), which is entirely double-track, except for the single-track section between El Prat de Llobregat and Barcelona–El Prat Airport stations. The trains on the line call at up to 34 stations, using the following railway lines, in order from south to north:

From	To	Railway line	Route number
Sant Vicenç de Calders (PK 618)	Barcelona Sants (PK 677.6)	Madrid–Barcelona	200
Airport (PK 0)	El Prat de Llobregat (PK 6.7)	Airport–El Prat de Llobregat	254
Barcelona Sants (PK 99)	Barcelona Estació de França (PK 106.6)	Madrid–Barcelona	260
Aragó Junction (PK 108.3) (after Barcelona Passeig de Gràcia station)	Sant Andreu Comtal (PK 113.2)	Aragó Tunnel	268
Sant Andreu Comtal (PK 113.2)	Maçanet-Massanes (PK 175.9)	Barcelona–Cerbère	270

All of the infrastructure used by the R2 is shared with other services, except the section between Barcelona–El Prat Airport and El Prat de Llobregat stations, which is exclusively used by R2 Nord services. Between Sant Vicenç de Calders and Barcelona Passeig de Gràcia stations, it shares tracks with Rodalies de Catalunya's regional rail lines R13, R14, R15 and R16, as well as a number of long-distance services to southern Spain, using the Aragó Tunnel through central Barcelona. R11 regional rail services commence their route at El Prat de Llobregat or Bellvitge stations, joining the route of the R2 and the other regional and long-distance services from these points on to Passeig de Gràcia. After Passeig de Gràcia, R2 Sud trains, together with the R13, R14, R15 and R16, as well as long-distance services, branch off to Barcelona's Estació de França, terminating there. The rest of R2 services continue northwards through the Aragó Tunnel, calling at El Clot-Aragó railway station, and share tracks with the R11 only. North of Mollet-Sant Fost railway station, Barcelona commuter rail service line R8 and several freight services join their route. The R8 terminates further north at Granollers Centre so that the R2 only shares tracks with the R11 and freight services from this point on.

== Operation ==
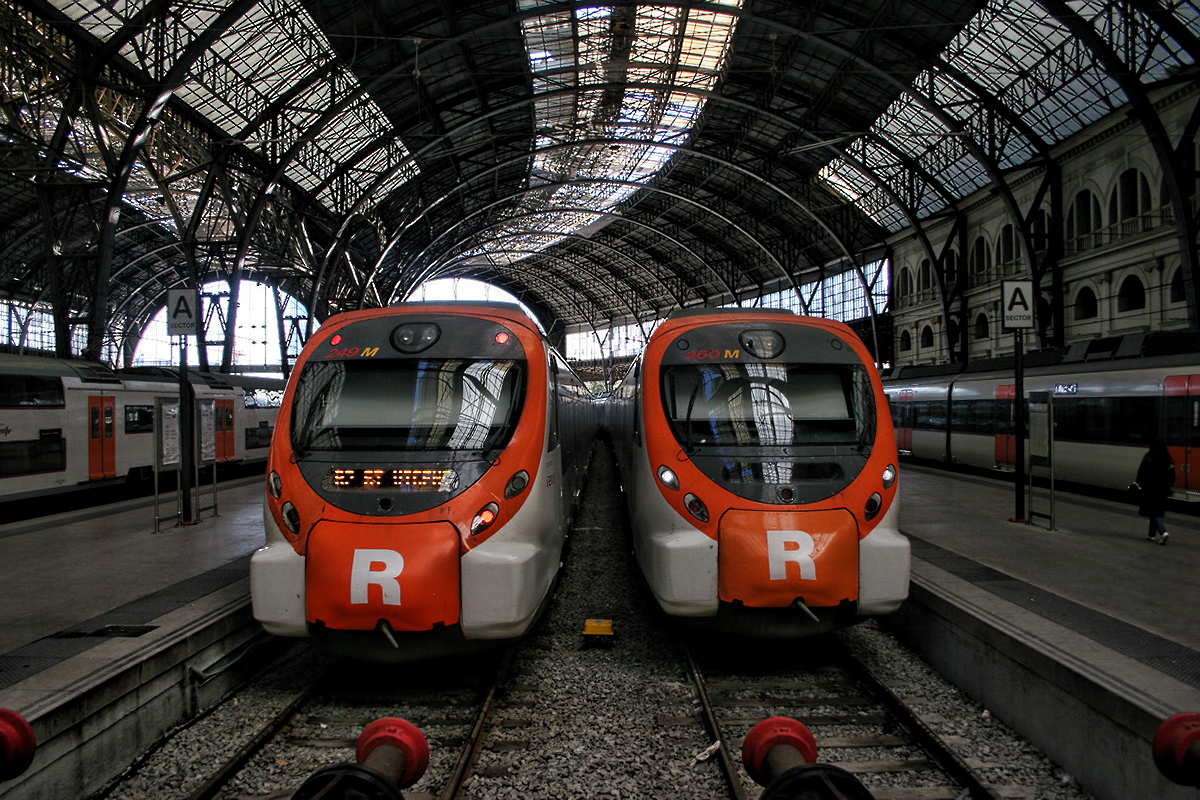
Two Civia trains at Barcelona's Estació de França in 2013. The left train is about to depart on a R2 Sud service to Sant Vicenç de Calders.

All services running south of Castelldefels railway station, to the south of Barcelona, use Estació de França as their northern terminus, with Vilanova i la Geltrú or Sant Vicenç de Calders stations serving as their southern terminus, in order from north to south. The services terminating at Vilanova i la Geltrú call at all stations along their route, whilst the ones terminating at Sant Vicenç de Calders operate limited service, running non-stop between Sitges and Castelldefels, as well as Gavà and Barcelona Sants. On the other hand, all services running north of Granollers Centre railway station, to the north of Barcelona, use the airport station as their southern terminus, with Sant Celoni or Maçanet-Massanes stations serving as their northern terminus, in order from south to north, calling at all stations. Some of the services terminating at the airport also use Granollers Centre as their northern terminus. The rest of the services on the R2 run between Castelldefels and Granollers Centre, calling at all stations, so that they terminate neither at the airport nor at Estació de França. The first trains run about 5:00 in the morning, with the latest arriving at about 1:00 at night.

The designation of the services on the line depends on the route they operate. All services terminating at the airport are designated R2 Nord ("R2 North"), whilst the services terminating at Estació de França are designated R2 Sud ("R2 South"). The Nord and Sud designations refer to the fact that such services mostly run on the line's northern and southern portion, respectively. The through services between Castelldefels and Granollers Centre are simply designated R2.

The current line scheme of the R2, implemented on 31 January 2009.

As of August 2015, the service routes operating on the R2 are as follows:

Line	Route	No. of stations	Journey time	Days of operation	Notes
	Castelldefels – Granollers Centre	14	1 h 2 min	Mon–Fri (Note: The services between Castelldefels and Granollers Centre do not run on 3–28 August.)	Calls at all stations along its route.
	Airport – Granollers Centre	12	59 min	Sat–Sun	Calls at all stations along its route.
	Airport – Sant Celoni	17	1 h 21 min	Daily	Calls at all stations along its route.
	Airport – Maçanet-Massanes	21	1 h 38 min	Daily	Calls at all stations along its route.
	Vilanova i la Geltrú – Barcelona Estació de França	12	1 h	Daily	Calls at all stations along its route.
	Sant Vicenç de Calders – Barcelona Estació de França	12	1 h 13 min	Daily	Calls at all stations along its route, excepting Garraf, Platja de Castelldefels, Viladecans, El Prat de Llobregat and Bellvitge stations, in order from south to north. Some early morning and late night services call at all stations.
In addition to the services mentioned above, which make up almost the entirety of the services running on the R2, the following services also operate on the line either in the early morning or at late night, calling at all stations (they are not listed in the table because they cannot be linked to a particular designation—R2, R2 Nord or R2 Sud): Sant Vicenç de Calders – Sant Celoni; Vilanova i la Geltrú – Granollers Centre; Vilanova i la Geltrú – Maçanet-Massanes; Castelldefels – Barcelona Sant Andreu Comtal; Castelldefels – Barcelona Estació de França; Airport – Barcelona Estació de França

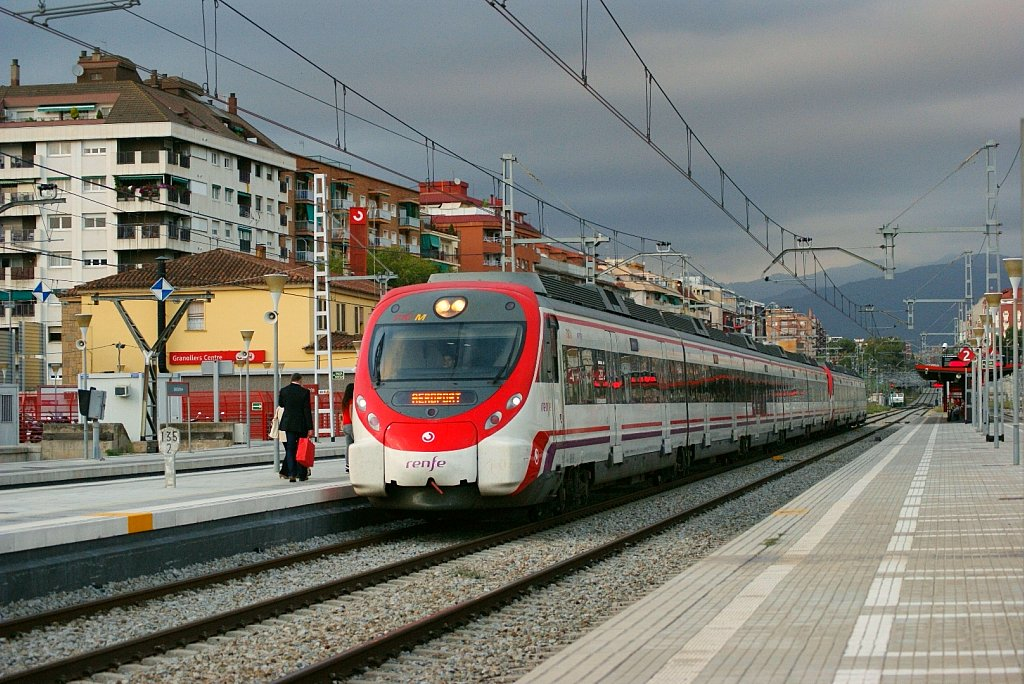
Two coupled Civia trains on a R2 Nord service bound for Barcelona–El Prat Airport at Granollers Centre railway station, in 2011.

The line's activity gathers on its southern section, between Vilanova i la Geltrú and Barcelona, where an approximate peak-time service frequency of 10 minutes is offered. All services on the line converge on the section between El Prat de Llobregat and Barcelona Passeig de Gràcia stations, where they together offer an approximate peak-time service frequency of 8 minutes. The overall service frequency reduces as the line moves away from Barcelona, especially on the section north of Sant Celoni, where R2 Nord services only operate during the morning rush hour or at night. During the rest of the day, this section is served by regional rail line R11. Moreover, the services between Castelldefels and Granollers Centre only run on weekdays.

As of August 2015, the approximate service frequencies on the R2 are as follows:

Section	Frequency		
Section	RH	OP	WE
Sant Vicenç de Calders – Vilanova i la Geltrú	30′	30′	30′
Vilanova i la Geltrú – Castelldefels	10′	15′	15′
Castelldefels – El Prat de Llobregat	10′	15′	15′
Airport – El Prat de Llobregat	30′	30′	30′
El Prat de Llobregat – Barcelona Passeig de Gràcia	8′	10′	10′
Barcelona Passeig de Gràcia – Barcelona Estació de França	10′	15′	15′
Barcelona Passeig de Gràcia – Granollers Centre	15′	15′	30′
Granollers Centre – Sant Celoni	15′	30′	60′
Sant Celoni – Maçanet-Massanes	60′	—	—

The trains used on the R2 are Civia—specifically, the 463, 464 and 465 Series, which consist of three, four and five cars per set, respectively, 447 Series, 450 Series and 451 Series electrical multiple units (EMU). The 450 and 451 Series are technically and aesthetically identical, differing only in the number of cars per set; the first consist of six cars, whilst the latter consist of three cars. Furthermore, they consist of double-decker cars, becoming the only type of bilevel rolling stock on the Rodalies de Catalunya system. The R2 is the only Rodalies de Catalunya line where 450 and 451 Series trains operate. Normally, the 450 Series runs only on R2 Sud services between Sant Vicenç de Calders and Barcelona's Estació de França, whilst the 451 Series runs only either on R2 Sud services between Vilanova i la Geltrú and Estació de França, or on R2 services between Castelldefels and Granollers Centre stations. Civia and 447 Series trains are used interchangeably on all R2, R2 Nord and R2 Sud services on the line. On average, the trains used on the line operate a total of 216 services every day on weekdays, accounting for a ridership of 125,948, according to 2008 data.

== Future ==
The 2008–2015 Rail Infrastructure Master Plan for the Barcelona Commuter Rail Service, developed by the Spanish Ministry of Public Works and Transport, plans to establish a "coast-to-coast" and "inland-to-inland" line scheme. According to this project, the current R2 will be extended southwards from Barcelona Sants to Sant Vicenç de Calders stations, via Vilafranca del Penedès, taking over the southern section of the present line R4. The R2 will become the "inland-to-inland" line, creating a new major south–north axis through the inland regions of the Barcelona metropolitan area. R2 trains will continue to use the Aragó Tunnel in central Barcelona with the new line scheme, which is currently not possible due to the configuration of the southern rail accesses to Barcelona Sants. A long-term project with an uncertain completion date, the new configuration would require multimillion-euro investments since it is associated with the construction of a new underground route in L'Hospitalet de Llobregat for the Rodalies de Catalunya lines running through the city as well as the new rail link for Barcelona–El Prat Airport.

As stated in the master plan, the proposed peak-time service frequencies for the future R2 would be as follows:

Section	tph
Sant Vicenç de Calders – Martorell	5
Martorell – Granollers Centre	10
Granollers Centre – Maçanet-Massanes	5

== List of stations ==
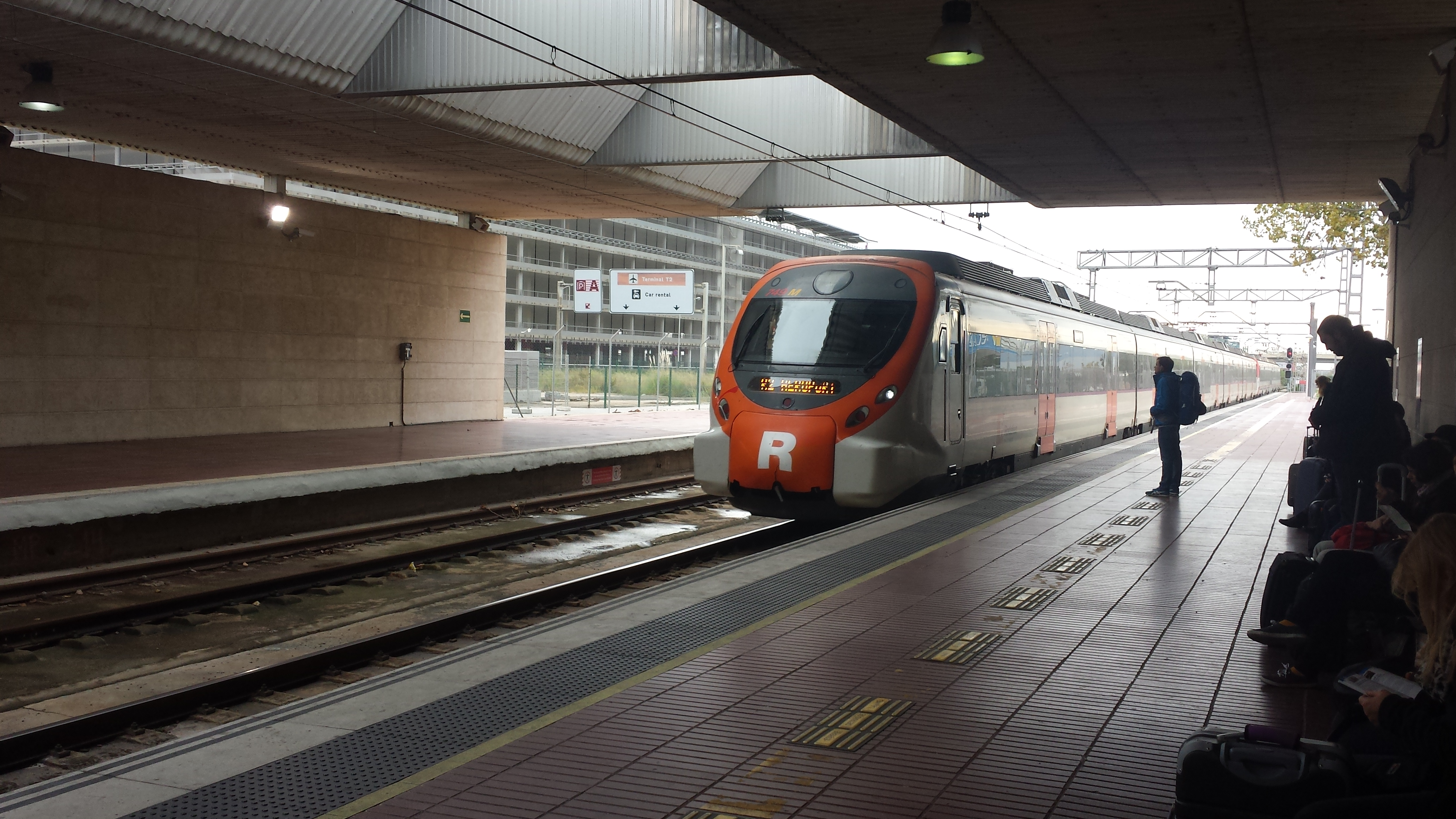
A Civia train on a R2 Nord service pulling into the station serving Barcelona–El Prat Airport in 2014.

The following table lists the name of each station served by line R2 in order from south to north; the station's service pattern offered by R2, R2 Nord and/or R2 Sud trains; the transfers to other Rodalies de Catalunya lines, including both commuter and regional rail services; remarkable transfers to other transport systems; the municipality in which each station is located; and the fare zone each station belongs to according to the Autoritat del Transport Metropolità (ATM Àrea de Barcelona) fare-integrated public transport system and Rodalies de Catalunya's own fare zone system for Barcelona commuter rail service lines.

#	Terminal of a service
*	Transfer station to other transport systems
#*	Transfer station and terminal
●	Station served by all trains running through it
○	Limited service station

Station	Service			Rodalies de Catalunya transfers	Other transfers	Municipality	Fare zone	
Station	R2	R2 Nord	R2 Sud	Rodalies de Catalunya transfers	Other transfers	Municipality	ATM AdB	Rod
Sant Vicenç de Calders#			●	R4, R13, R14, R15, R16, R17, RT2	—	El Vendrell	6A	6
Calafell			●	R13, R14, R15	—	Calafell	5A	5
Segur de Calafell			●	R13, R14, R15	—	Calafell	5A	5
Cunit			●	R13, R14, R15	—	Cunit	5A	5
Cubelles			●	R13, R14, R15	—	Cubelles	4A	5
Vilanova i la Geltrú#			●	R13, R14, R15, R16, R17	—	Vilanova i la Geltrú	4A	4
Sitges			●	R13, R14, R15	—	Sitges	3A	4
Garraf			○	—	—	Sitges	2A	3
Platja de Castelldefels			○	—	—	Castelldefels	1	2
Castelldefels#	●		●	R13, R14, R15	—	Castelldefels	1	2
Gavà	●		●	R13, R14, R15	—	Gavà	1	2
Viladecans	●		○	R15	—	Viladecans	1	2
Airport#*		●		—	Barcelona–El Prat Airport; Barcelona Metro line 9 (L9 Sud)	El Prat de Llobregat	1	4
El Prat de Llobregat*	●	●	○	R15	Barcelona Metro line 9 (L9 Sud)	El Prat de Llobregat	1	1
Bellvitge*	●	●	○	R15	Barcelona Metro line 8, as well as Baix Llobregat Metro and other commuter rail services at Gornal station	L'Hospitalet de Llobregat	1	1
Barcelona Sants*	●	●	●	R1, R3, R4, R11, R12, R13, R14, R15, R16, R17, RG1	Renfe Operadora-operated high-speed and long-distance rail services TGV high-speed rail services Barcelona Metro lines 3 and 5 at Sants Estació station National and international coach services	Barcelona	1	1
Barcelona Passeig de Gràcia*	●	●	●	R11, R13, R14, R15, R16, R17	Barcelona Metro lines 2, 3 and 4	Barcelona	1	1
Barcelona Estació de França#*			●	R13, R14, R15, R16, R17	Renfe Operadora-operated long-distance rail services Barcelona Metro line 4 at Barceloneta station	Barcelona	1	1
Barcelona El Clot-Aragó*	●	●		R1, R11, RG1	Barcelona Metro lines 1 and 2	Barcelona	1	1
Barcelona Sant Andreu Comtal*	●	●		R11	Barcelona Metro line 1 at Sant Andreu station	Barcelona	1	1
Montcada i Reixac	●	●		—	—	Montcada i Reixac	1	1
La Llagosta	●	●		—	—	La Llagosta	2D	2
Mollet-Sant Fost	●	●		R8	—	Mollet del Vallès	2D	2
Montmeló	●	●		R8	—	Montmeló	2D	2
Granollers Centre#	●	●		R8, R11	—	Granollers	3D	3
Les Franqueses-Granollers Nord		●		—	—	Les Franqueses del Vallès	3D	3
Cardedeu		●		—	—	Cardedeu	3D	4
Llinars del Vallès		●		—	—	Llinars del Vallès	3D	4
Palautordera		●		—	—	Santa Maria de Palautordera	4G	5
Sant Celoni#		●		R11	—	Sant Celoni	4G	5
Gualba		●		R11	—	Gualba	4G	5
Riells i Viabrea-Breda		●		R11	—	Riells i Viabrea	4G	5
Hostalric		●		R11	—	Hostalric	5H	6
Maçanet-Massanes#		●		R1, R11, RG1	—	Maçanet de la Selva	6G	6

== Bibliography ==
- Julià Sort, Jordi (October 2013). Sagrera i la xarxa ferroviària de Barcelona [Sagrera and Barcelona's railway system] (in Catalan). Barcelona: Viena Edicions. ISBN 978-84-8330-740-3.
- Plan de infraestructuras ferroviarias de cercanías de Barcelona 2008-2015 [2008–2015 Infrastructure Master Plan for the Barcelona Commuter Rail Service] (PDF) (Technical report) (in Spanish). Ministry of Public Works and Transport. Government of Spain. February 2009 – via Associació per a la Promoció del Transport Públic.
