= R10 (Rodalies de Catalunya) =

Commuter rail in Barcelona, Spain (2007–2009)

Overview
- Service type: Commuter rail
- Status: Suspended
- Locale: Barcelona metropolitan area
- First service: 22 July 2006
- Last service: 30 January 2009
- Former operator(s): Renfe Operadora

Route
- Termini: Barcelona–El Prat Airport; Barcelona Estació de França
- Stops: 6
- Distance travelled: 22 km (14 mi)
- Service frequency: 30 min
- Line(s) used: Madrid–Barcelona; Barcelona–El Prat Airport rail link

Technical
- Rolling stock: Civia EMUs
- Track gauge: 1,668 mm (5 ft 5 21/32 in) Iberian gauge
- Electrification: 3,000 V DC overhead lines
- Track owner(s): Adif

The R10 was a line of Rodalies de Catalunya's Barcelona commuter rail service, operated by Renfe Operadora. It linked half-hourly Barcelona–El Prat Airport with Barcelona's Estació de França, using the Aragó Tunnel through central Barcelona, calling at Sants and Passeig de Gràcia stations. R10 services spanned 22 kilometres (14 mi) of railway lines and six stations. At the time it suspended services, the trains used on the line were Civia electrical multiple units (EMU).

The direct services between the airport and central Barcelona, previously provided by Barcelona commuter rail service line R1, had been discontinued on 4 December 2005 due to the construction works of the Madrid–Barcelona high-speed rail line in Barcelona's southern accesses. At that moment, the R1 started operating as a shuttle line between the airport and El Prat de Llobregat railway station. On 22 July 2006, the R10 started services as a newly created line of the Rodalies Barcelona commuter rail system, predecessor of Rodalies de Catalunya, providing a direct rail link between the airport and central Barcelona anew. The construction works of the new Sagrera railway station and the urban renewal project associated with it caused the suspension of the R10 on 31 January 2009. Barcelona commuter rail service line R2 then took over the service previously offered by the line, incorporating the branch lines to the airport and Estació de França. The R10 was initially scheduled to resume services two years later.

In the long-term future, it is projected that the R10 will be definitely suspended, and the branch line to Estació de França will be dismantled. Barcelona commuter rail service lines R4 and R7 will be rerouted in order to serve as the direct rail link between the airport and central Barcelona, using the airport as their southern terminus.

== List of stations ==
The stations served by the R10, in order from south to north, were as follows:

- Airport
- El Prat de Llobregat
- Bellvitge
- Barcelona Sants
- Barcelona Passeig de Gràcia
- Barcelona Estació de França
