= Aragó Tunnel =

Railway tunnel in Barcelona, Spain

Overview
- Owner: Adif
- Locale: Barcelona, Spain
- Termini: Barcelona Sants; El Clot-Aragó
- Stations: 3

Service
- Type: Commuter rail
- System: Rodalies de Catalunya
- Operator(s): Renfe

History
- Opened: 1970s

Technical
- Track gauge: 1,668 mm (5 ft 5 21/32 in) Iberian gauge

The Aragó Tunnel is a railway tunnel in the Spanish city of Barcelona. Built in the 1970s, it replaced the previously existing railway that ran in a cutting through the city centre.

== Services ==
The tunnel is served by Rodalies de Catalunya services R2, R2 Nord and R2 Sud and regional lines R11, R13, R14, R15 and R16.

== Stations ==
- Barcelona Sants
- Passeig de Gràcia
- El Clot-Aragó
- Tunnel of Provença

== See also ==
- Meridiana Tunnel
