= Aeroport T2 station =

Subway and Rodalies station at Barcelona Airport

Aeroport T2
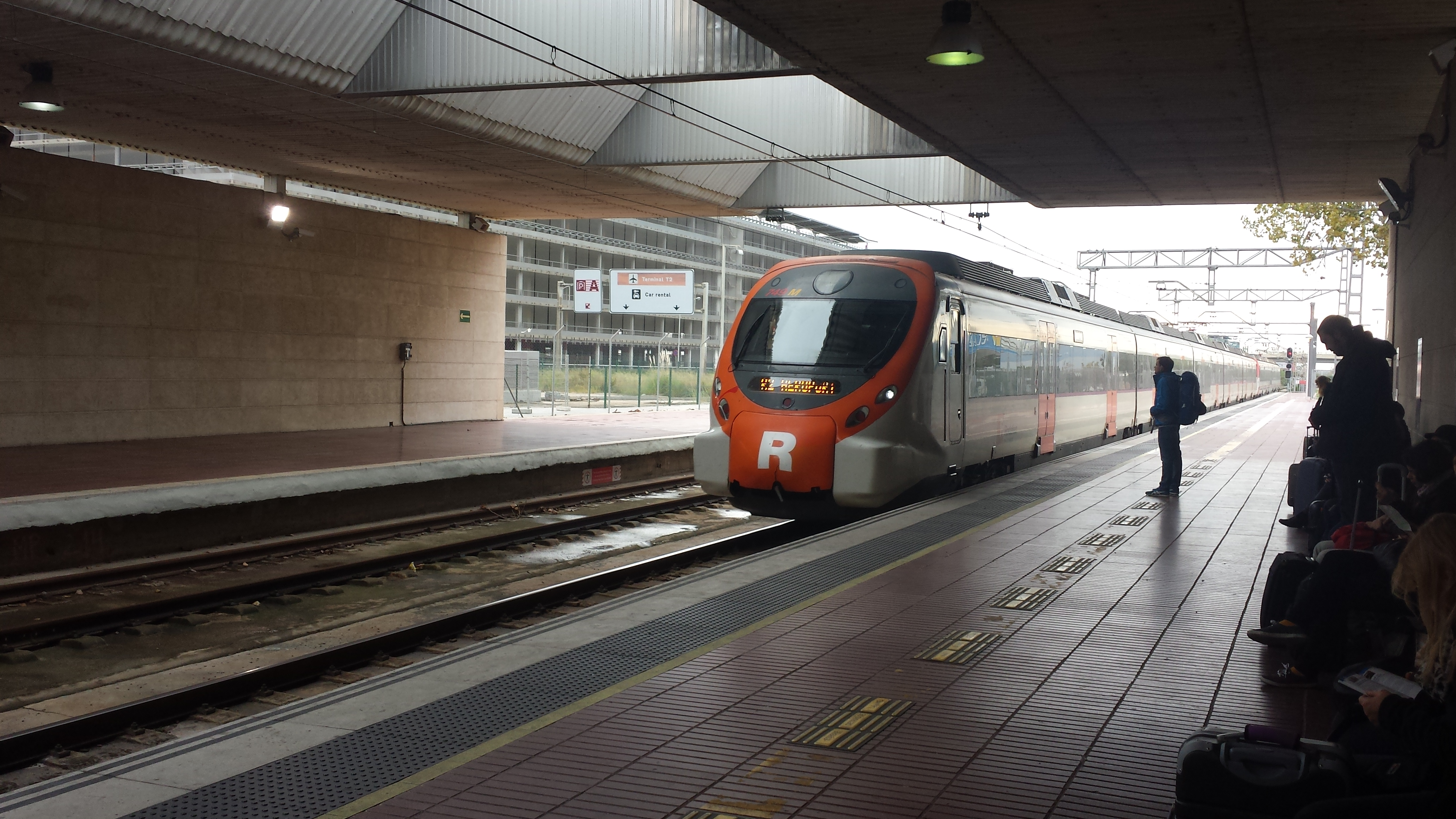
- A Renfe Operadora Civia train pulling into the Rodalies de Catalunya station in 2014.

General information
- Location: Carrer de Salvador Hedilla; 08820 El Prat de Llobregat; Catalonia; Spain
- Coordinates: 41°18′15.32″N 2°4′23.9″E
- System: Rodalies de Catalunya commuter rail station TMB rapid transit station
- Owner: Adif (Rodalies de Catalunya); Ifercat (Barcelona Metro)
- Operator: Renfe Operadora (Rodalies de Catalunya); Transports Metropolitans de Barcelona (TMB; Barcelona Metro)
- Lines: : El Prat de Llobregat–Airport (PK 6.7); : Barcelona Metro line 9
- Platforms: : 1 bay platform; : 2 side platforms
- Tracks: : 1; : 2
- Connections: Barcelona–El Prat Airport; Local and interurban buses

Construction
- Structure type: : At-grade; : Underground
- Parking: Several airport parking garages serving Barcelona–El Prat Airport's terminal T2 are located nearby.
- Accessible: The Barcelona Metro station is fully disabled-accessible.

Other information
- Station code: : 72400; : 903
- Fare zone: 1 (ATM Àrea de Barcelona); 4 (Rodalies de Catalunya's Barcelona commuter rail service)

History
- Opened: : 15 July 1975; : 12 February 2016

Services
Preceding station	Rodalies de Catalunya	Following station
Terminus	R2 Nord	El Prat de Llobregat towards Maçanet-Massanes
Suspended
Terminus	R10	El Prat de Llobregat towards Barcelona Estació de França
Preceding station	Metro	Following station
Aeroport T1 towards Airport T1	L9 Sud	Mas Blau towards Zona Universitària
Projected
Aeroport Terminal de Càrrega towards Aeroport T1	L2	Mas Blau towards Badalona Pompeu Fabra
Aeroport Terminal de Càrrega towards Airport T1	L9	Mas Blau towards Can Zam
Location

Aeroport T2 (Catalan pronunciation: [əˌeɾuˈpɔrt tərmiˈnal ˈdos]) is both a Rodalies de Catalunya commuter rail station and a Barcelona Metro station serving terminal complex T2 of Barcelona–El Prat Airport. They are located adjacent to the airport's terminal T2B, in the municipality of El Prat de Llobregat, to the southwest of Barcelona, in Catalonia, Spain. The Rodalies de Catalunya station is the southern terminus of the current rail link coming from El Prat de Llobregat railway station. It is operated by Renfe Operadora and is served by Barcelona commuter rail service line R2 Nord. The metro station is on the airport branch of Barcelona Metro line 9 (L9) and is operated by Transports Metropolitans de Barcelona (TMB).

Opened in 1975, the current Rodalies de Catalunya station is the only commuter rail station serving the airport, so that it is simply known as Airport (Spanish: Aeropuerto, Catalan: Aeroport). Besides, it is due to disappear around 2022 with the construction of a new airport rail link, which will also reach airport terminal T1. The Barcelona Metro line 9 station started operating in 2016, when the line's 20-kilometre-long (12 mi) portion between the airport terminals and Zona Universitària station in western Barcelona opened for passenger service as the L9 Sud ("South").

== Location ==
Both the Rodalies de Catalunya and the Barcelona Metro stations are located right in front of airport terminal T2B, to which it is connected by an elevated walkway crossing over a parking lot and a road serving terminal complex T2. The Rodalies station is located at-grade, whilst the metro station lies underground, parallel to it. Terminals T2A and T2C can be accessed on foot through terminal T2B. The Rodalies de Catalunya users heading for terminal T1, located about 1.8 kilometres (1.1 mi) away from the station, need to use the airport's free shuttle bus between terminal complexes T1 and T2. The shuttle bus service runs 24 hours a day with a service pattern of 4 minutes (8:00–20:00), 7 minutes (20:00–0:00) or 20 minutes (00:00–5:00), and has stops in front of terminals T2B and T2C as well as both the arrival and departure areas of terminal T1.

== History ==
=== Commuter rail link ===
A single-track railway line between Barcelona–El Prat Airport and Barcelona Sants station, including the current at-grade airport station and the connecting elevated walkway to the airport terminal, was officially opened on 15 July 1975 by the then-Princes of Spain Juan Carlos and Sofía. At the time it started operating, the airport station was served half-hourly by non-stopping shuttle services to Barcelona Sants, with a journey time of 14 minutes. This was therefore the first airport rail link in Spain and one of the earliest such airport rail links in the world.

On 28 May 1989, with the dismantling of the former route of the Barcelona–Mataró–Maçanet-Massanes railway through the Barcelona neighborhood of Poblenou, the airport station began to serve as the southern terminus of all commuter rail services running from Mataró. All those trains used the Meridiana Tunnel in central Barcelona, calling at Sants and Plaça de Catalunya stations, with an initial service frequency of 30 minutes in each direction.

Due to the construction works of the Madrid–Barcelona high-speed rail line in Barcelona's southern accesses, the services between Mataró and the airport station were suspended on 4 December 2005 and replaced with shuttle trains between the airport and El Prat de Llobregat railway station. On 22 July 2006, a new Rodalies Barcelona line numbered 10 (or R10, with the current Rodalies de Catalunya designation) dedicated to serving the airport started operating. With a service frequency of 30 minutes in each direction, the new line ran between the airport station and Barcelona's Estació de França, using the Aragó Tunnel in central Barcelona, calling at Sants and Passeig de Gràcia stations.

Due to construction works near Sant Andreu Comtal railway station in Barcelona, a "temporary" restructuring affecting lines R2 and R10 was implemented on 31 January 2009: the R10 was suspended and the R2 was divided into three different lines—R2, R2 Nord ("North") and R2 Sud ("South")—. Thus, line R2 Nord started operating at the airport station, originating the current line scheme. The R10 was initially scheduled to resume services two years later.

=== Barcelona Metro ===
A tunneling machine began excavating the tunnel of Barcelona Metro line 9 from Mas Blau to Airport T1 stations in March 2008, reaching the latter in April 2009. At that moment, the airport branch of Barcelona Metro line 9 was expected to open for passenger service in 2012. In March 2012, the Government of Catalonia announced the opening date of the line's section between Airport T1 and Zona Universitària stations was to be delayed until 2014, after passing a modification on the funding of several sections of the L9 in order to prioritize the arrival of the metro line at the airport. In June 2014, the government announced that the Airport T1–Zona Universitària section, excepting Aeroport Terminal de Càrrega, La Ribera and Camp Nou stations, would open in the first six months of 2016. The first day of passenger service was 12 February 2016.

== Rail services ==
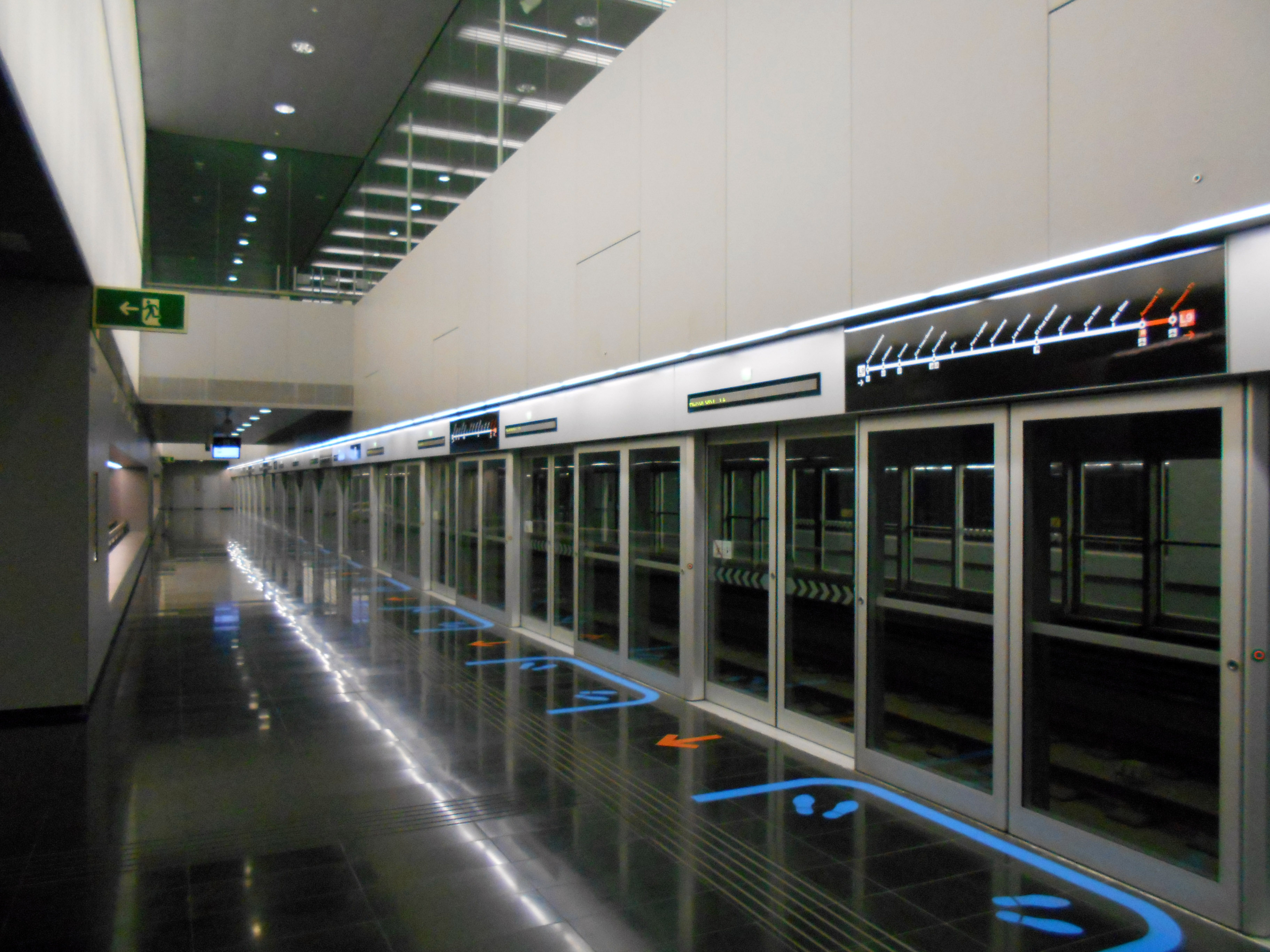
The Airport T1-bound platform at the Barcelona Metro line 9 station.

The Rodalies de Catalunya station is served half-hourly by Barcelona commuter rail service line R2 Nord. Typical weekday services usually run between the airport and Maçanet-Massanes or Sant Celoni stations, via Barcelona. However, there also exist some services between the airport and Granollers Centre railway station, specially during the weekend. All trains call at Barcelona Sants—the city's main station—and Barcelona Passeig de Gràcia—the line's station serving central Barcelona—, with an average journey time of 19 and 26 minutes, respectively.

Barcelona Metro line 9 services, designated L9 Sud ("L9 South"), run driverless at a basic frequency of 7 minutes in each direction between Airport T1 and Zona Universitària in western Barcelona. Additional partial services may be added if necessary, reducing the frequency to 4 minutes.

== Fares ==
Aeroport T2 station belongs to different fare zones depending on the entity issuing the tickets. On the one hand, Rodalies de Catalunya has its own fare zone system and considers the station to be in fare zone 4 of its Barcelona commuter rail service, so that a single ticket to Barcelona (or the other way around) costs €4.1. On the other hand, the Autoritat del Transport Metropolità (ATM)—a public agency in charge of coordinating public transport operators in the Barcelona area—considers it to be in fare zone 1, in the same way as the transport stations located in the city of Barcelona and its adjacent municipalities. Thus, the price of a journey between Barcelona and the airport varies significantly due to the fact that, in the case of Rodalies de Catalunya, four fare zones are crossed, though, in the case of the ATM, only one fare zone is crossed.

Although Transports Metropolitans de Barcelona (TMB), the operator of the Barcelona Metro station, uses the ATM fare zone system, the basic single ticket issued by the company is not valid at this station, and the passengers using the metro stations located at the airport terminals are required to buy a special ticket known as an airport ticket. This ticket costs €4.5 and gives access to the rest of the TMB-operated Barcelona Metro system. In contrast, all multiple-time tickets and unlimited passes issued by the ATM are valid at this station, with the exception of the T-10 ten-trip ticket.

== Future ==
Construction works for a new 5.2-kilometre-long (3.2 mi) double-track rail link for Barcelona–El Prat Airport started in July 2015, with a completion date around 2027, delayed from the original 2018 and 2022 completion years. The new rail link will commence at El Prat de Llobregat railway station and will have stations at both airport terminals T1 and T2, replacing the current single-track line and Rodalies de Catalunya station serving the airport.

There is also a project to extend Barcelona Metro line 2 (L2) southwards by 6.3 kilometres (3.9 miles) using the route of the L9 between Parc Logístic and Airport T1 stations.
