= Barcelona–Cerbère railway =

Railway line in Spain

Coordinates: 41.3840°N 2.1867°E

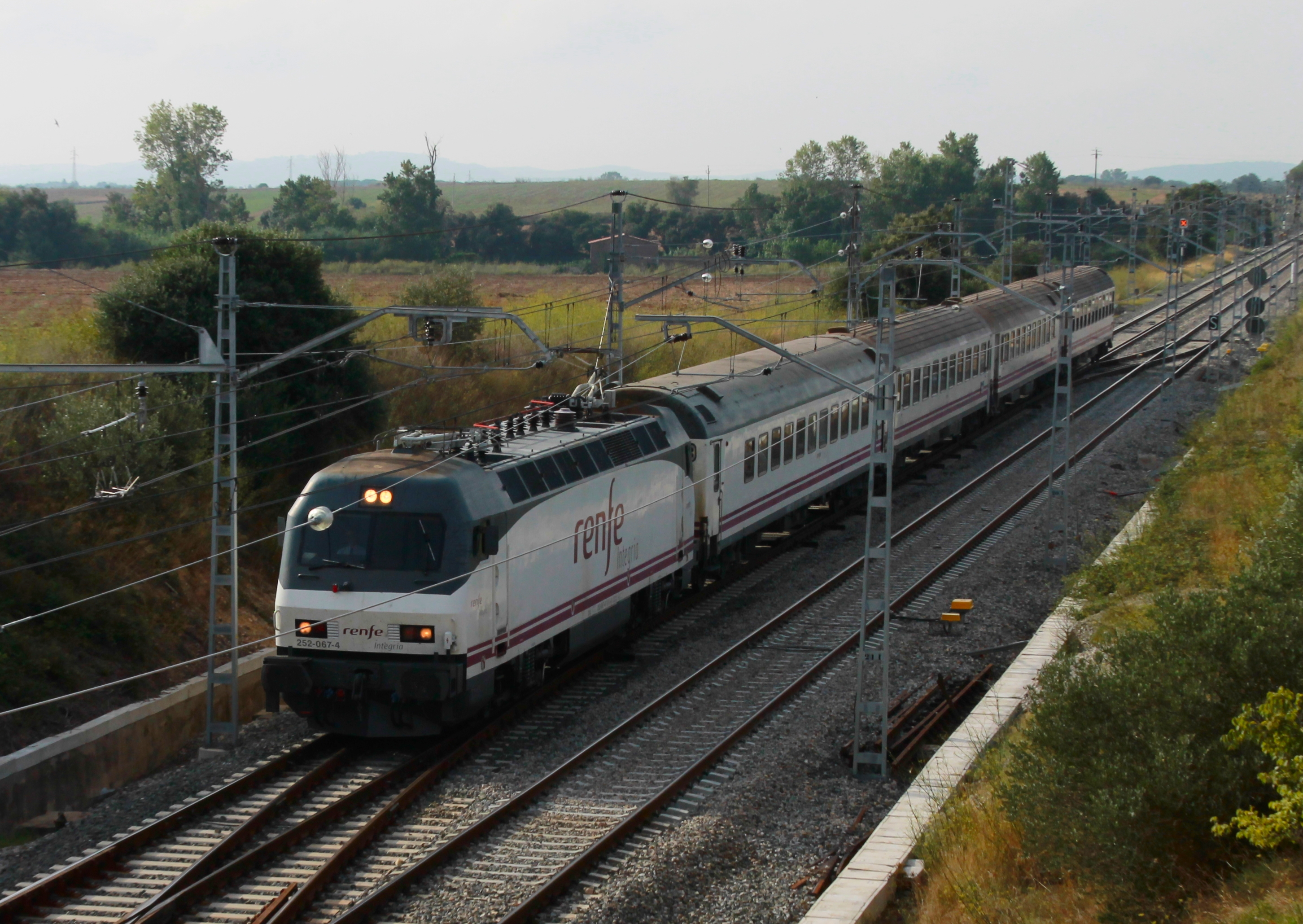
- Renfe Operadora's Estrella "Costa Brava" train hauled by a locomotive 252.040 near Vilamalla station

Overview
- Native name: Línia Barcelona-Cervera de la Marenda
- Status: Operational
- Owner: Adif
- Line number: R2, R2 Nord, R8, R11, RG1
- Locale: Catalonia
- Termini: Barcelona Sants railway station; Gare de Cerbère

Service
- Type: Heavy rail
- Route number: 270
- Operator(s): Renfe Operadora

History
- Opened: 1854

Technical
- Line length: 168.1 km (104.5 mi)
- Number of tracks: 2
- Character: At-grade (Note: Although the Barcelona–Cerbère railway is at-grade for almost all of its length, it runs underground as it passes through Montmeló.)
- Track gauge: 1,668 mm (5 ft 5 21/32 in) Iberian gauge
- Electrification: 3 kV DC overhead lines
- Operating speed: 160 km/h (99 mph)

The Barcelona–Cerbère railway is a 168-kilometre (104.39 mi) railway line linking Barcelona in Catalonia, Spain to Cerbère in France. It is served by the Rodalies de Catalunya commuter network, Renfe regional, MD, AVE, Avlo and Avant train services, and TGV trains. The line stars at Barcelona Sants railway station, and passes through the Catalan regional cities of Girona and Figueres before reaching the French border, and then Cerbère, just across the border. It is an important commuter and High Speed line, connecting Paris, Montpellier and Perpinyà to Spain.

== History ==
It was built between 1858 and 1878 and electrified between 1981 and 1982 . It used to start at the Estació de França in Barcelona, but now starts at the Sants station.

== Major stations along the railway ==
Barcelona Sants railway station

Plaça de Catalunya railway station

Arc de triomf railway station

El Clot-Aragó railway station

Sant Andreu Comtal railway station

Granollers Centre railway station

Girona railway station

Figueres railway station

Portbou railway station

Cerbère station

== Gallery ==
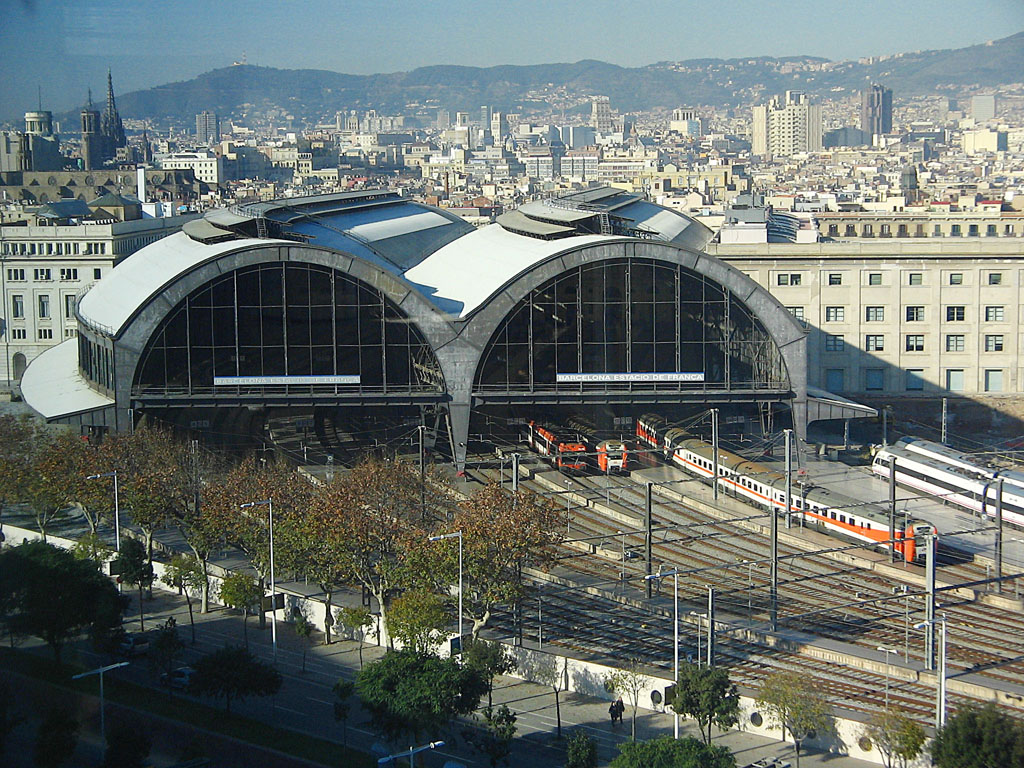
Barcelona Estació de França

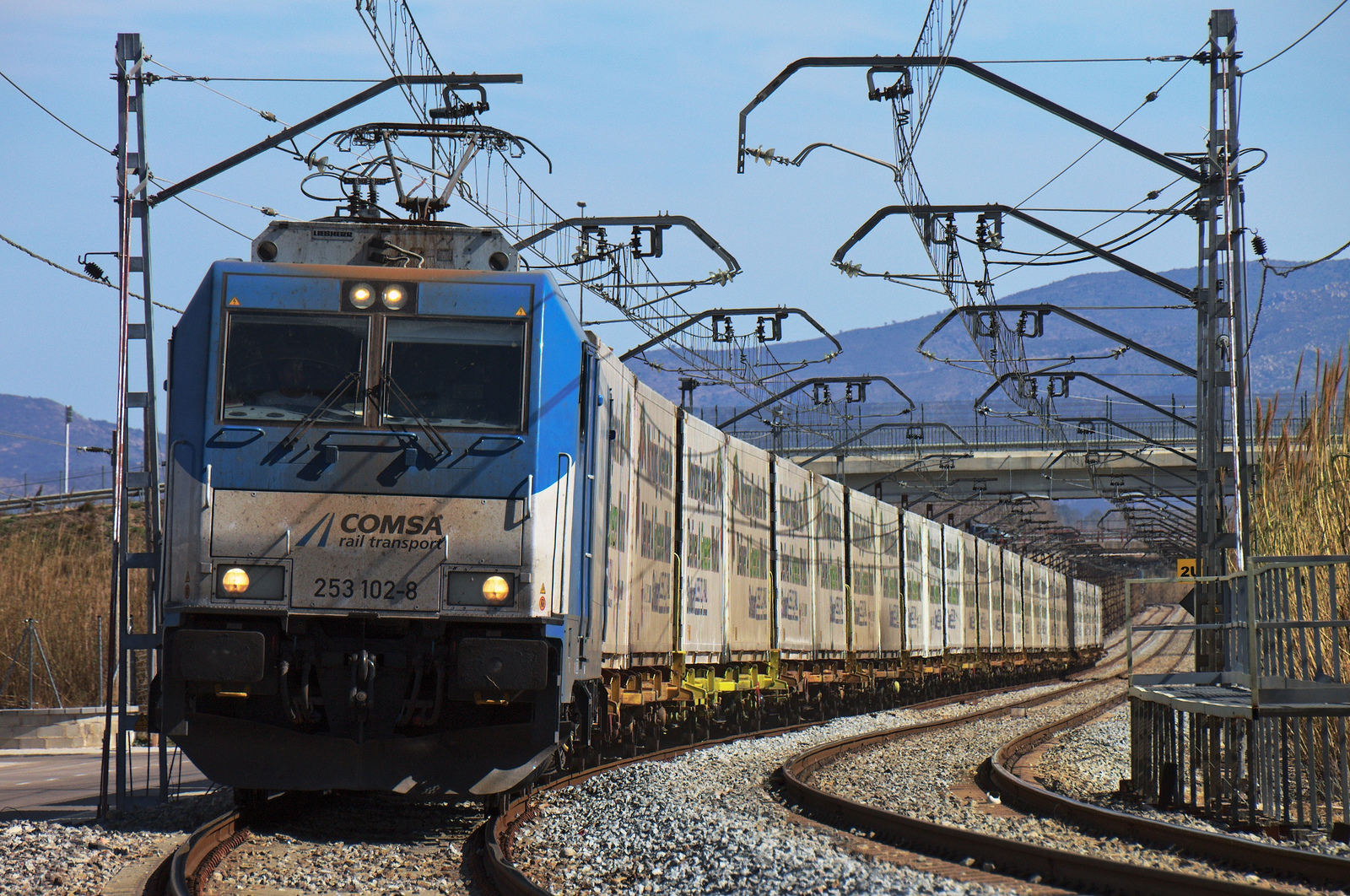
Freight train on the line

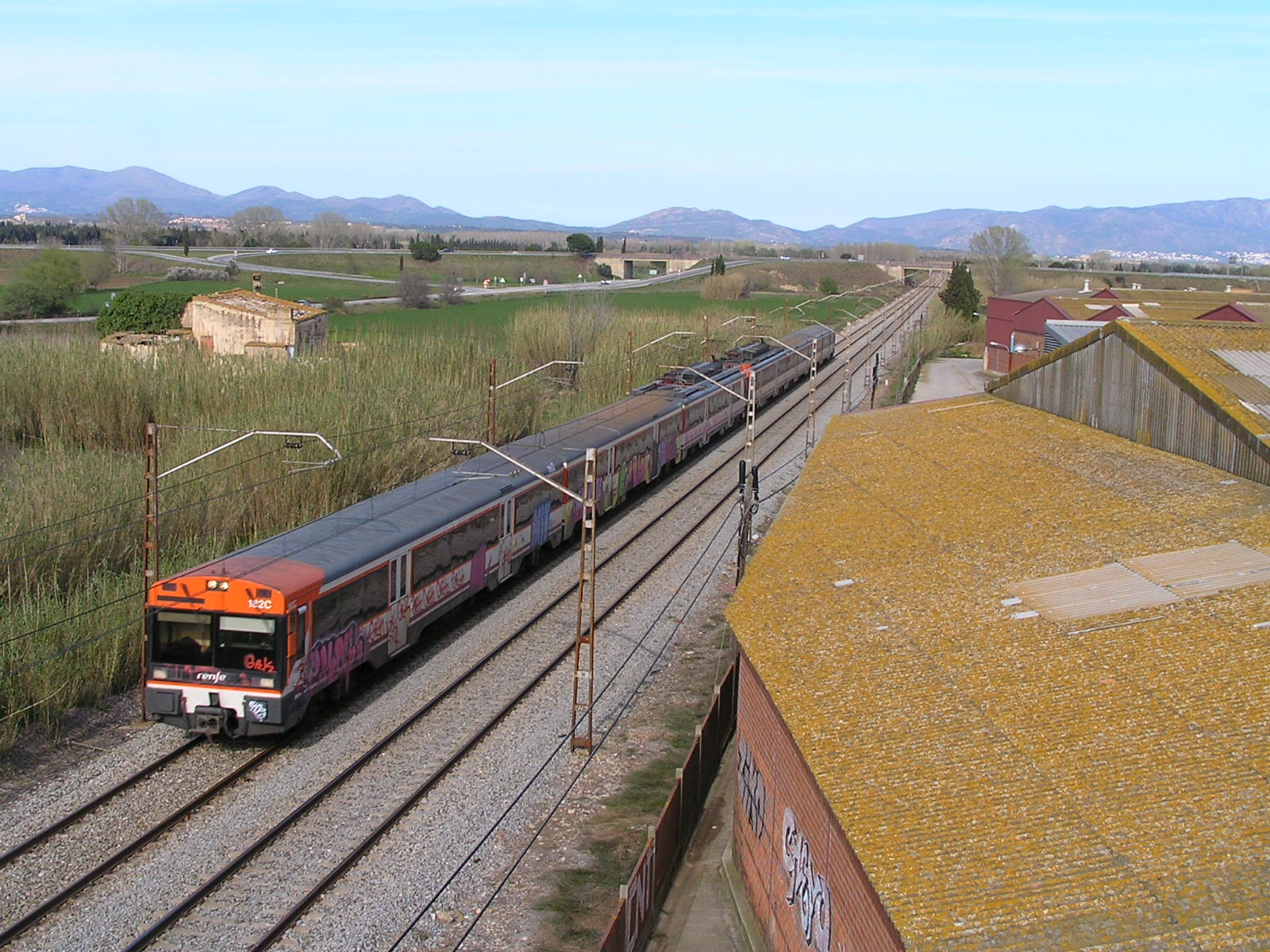
Regional train

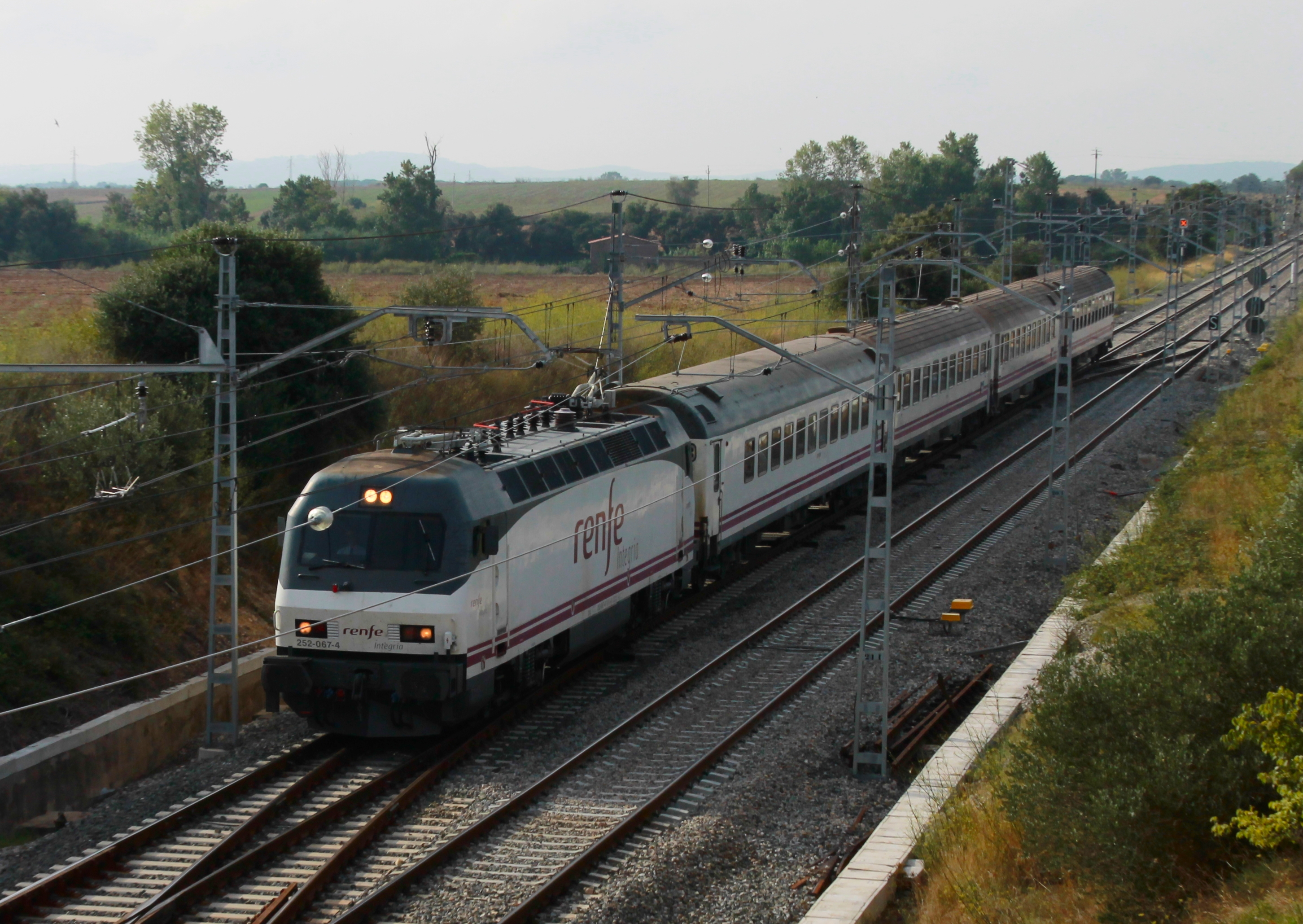
Estrella

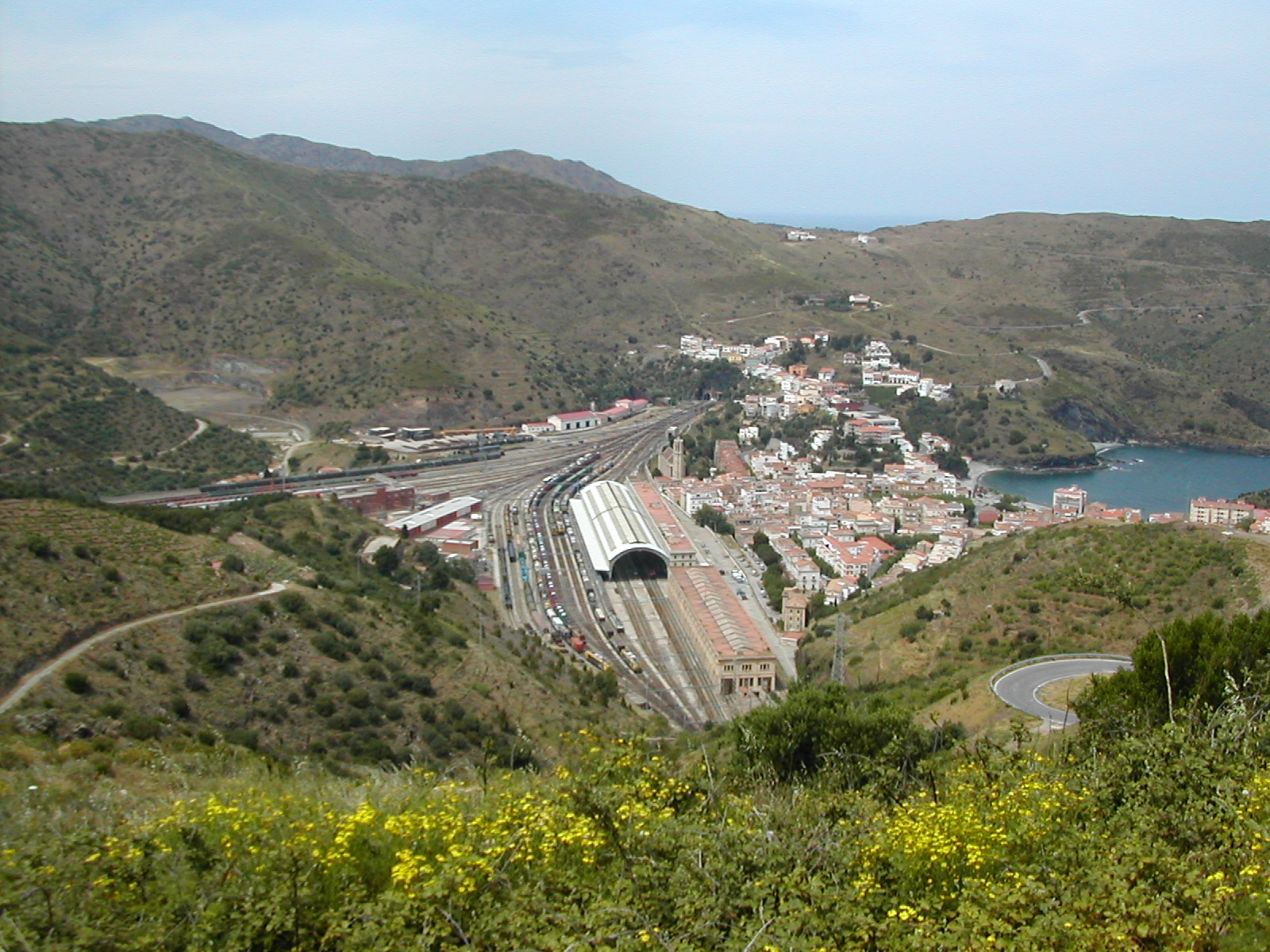
Portbou railway station

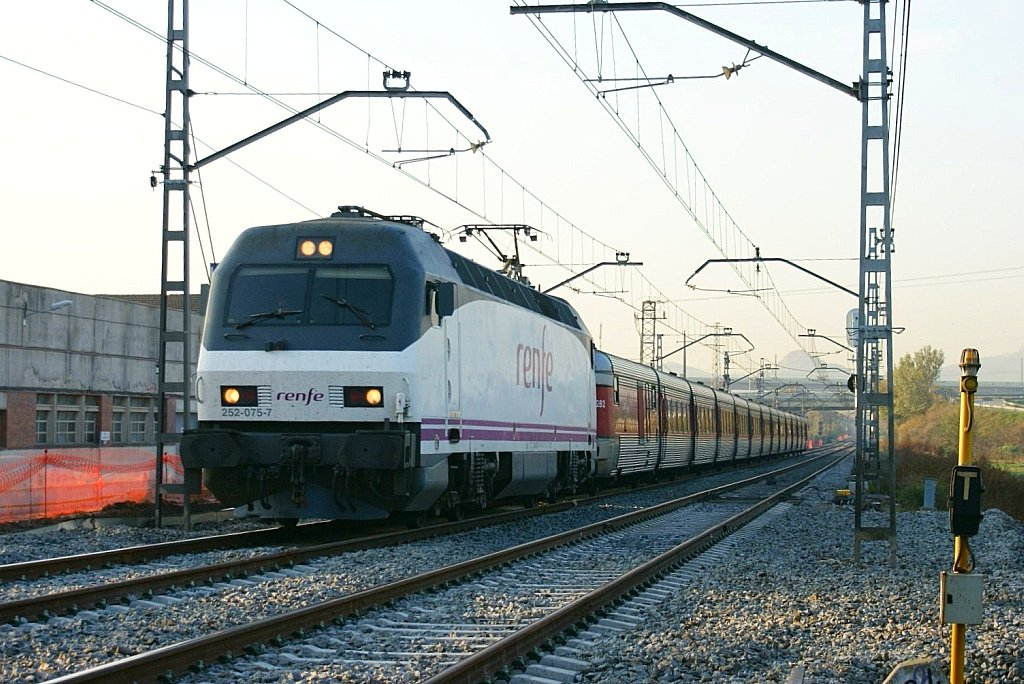
Locomotive 252.075 with the Catalan Talgo.

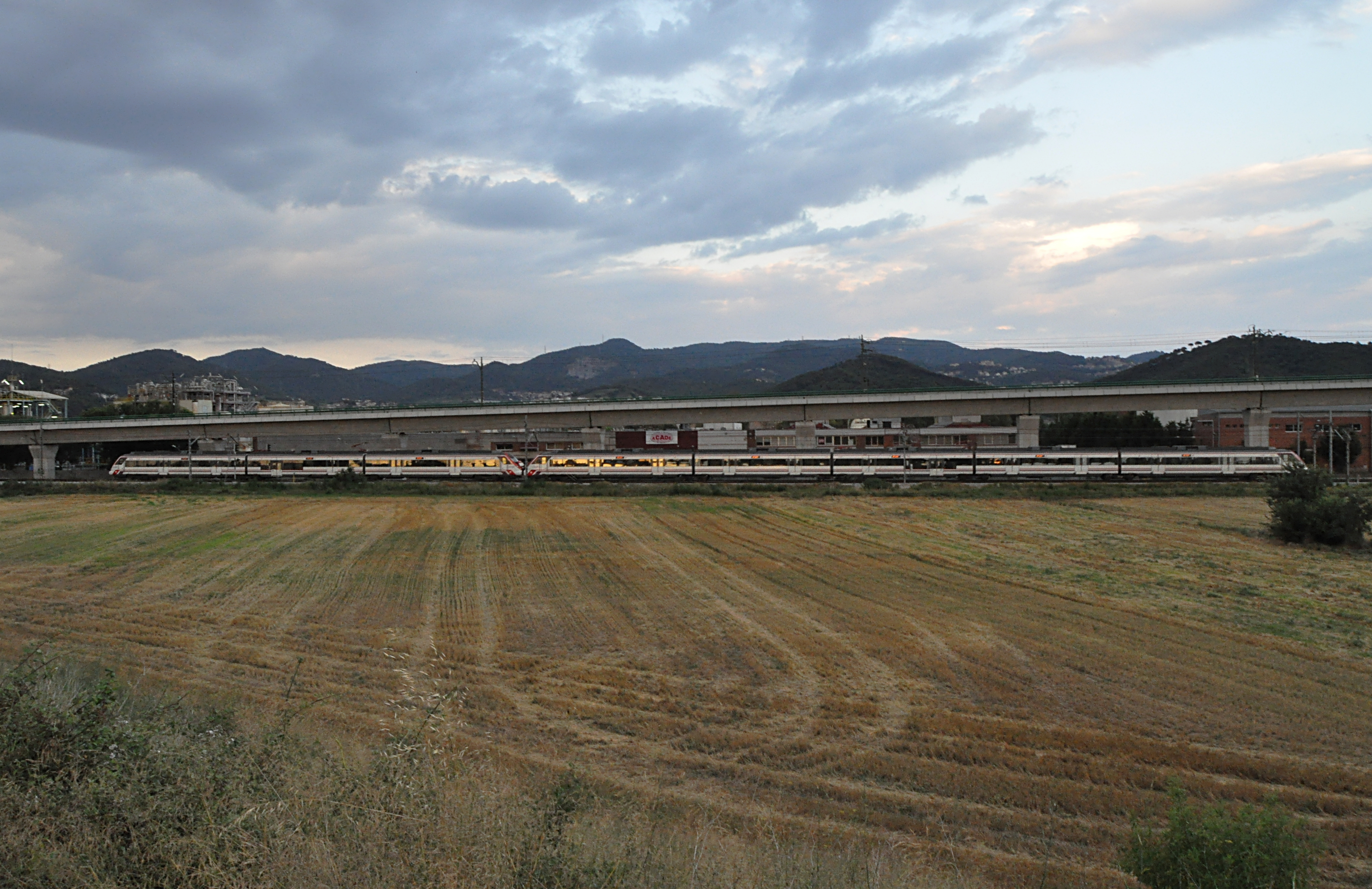
A Civia 465+463 near Mollet - Sant Fost train station.

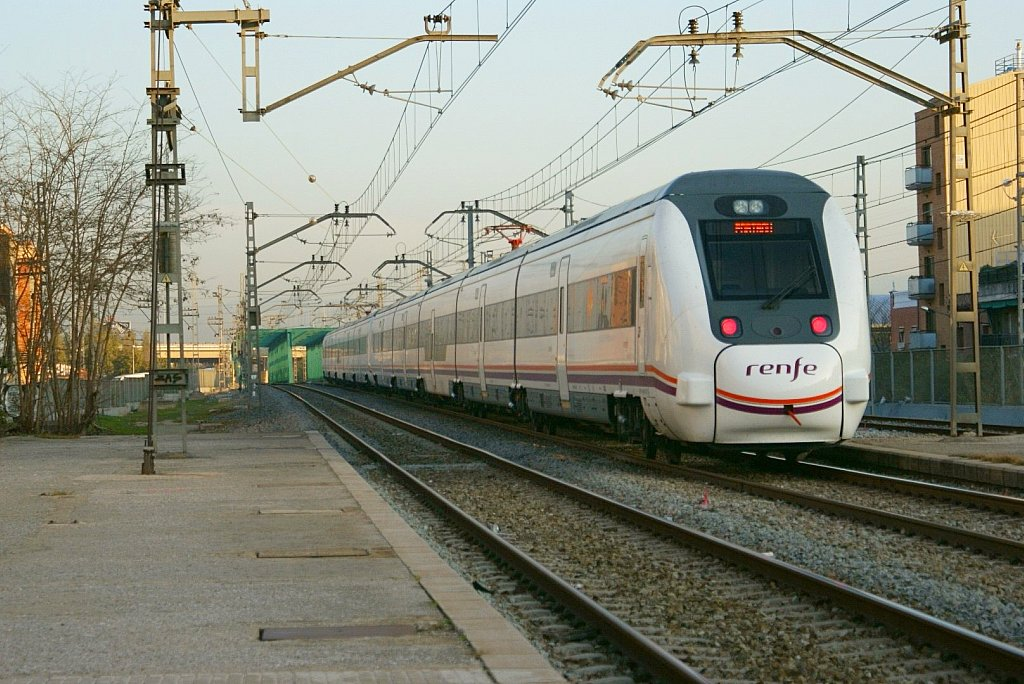
RENFE Class 449 in Montcada i Reixac train station.

== See also ==
- Perpignan–Barcelona high-speed rail line
