= Granollers Centre railway station =

Railway station in Granollers, Spain

Granollers Centre
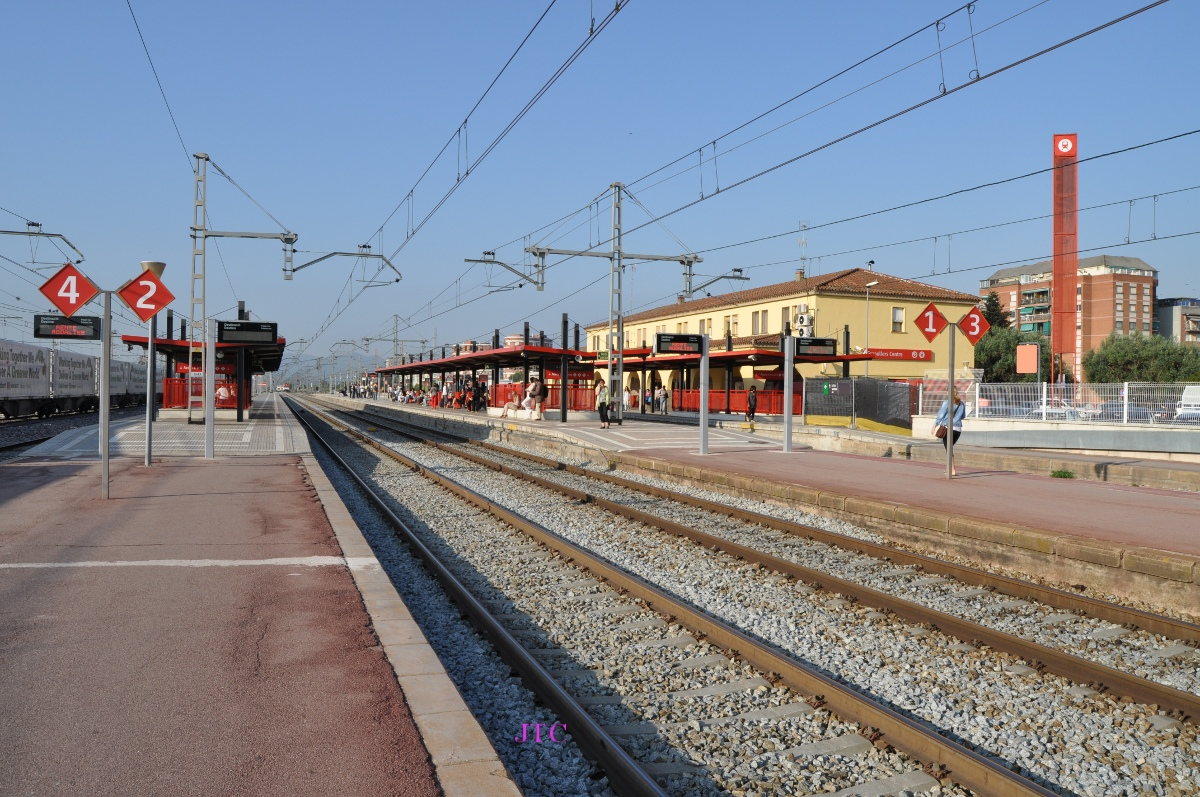
- A view of the platforms of the station in 2010.

General information
- Location: Carrer Llevant; 17412 Granollers; Catalonia; Spain
- Coordinates: 41.5997°N 2.2913°E
- System: Rodalies de Catalunya commuter and regional rail station
- Owner: Adif
- Operator: Renfe Operadora
- Line: Barcelona–Cerbère (PK 28.7)
- Platforms: 3 island platforms
- Tracks: 10

Construction
- Structure type: At-grade
- Parking: Yes
- Accessible: Yes

Other information
- Station code: 79100
- Fare zone: 3D (ATM Àrea de Barcelona); 3 (Rodalies de Catalunya's Barcelona commuter rail service)

History
- Opened: 22 July 1854
- Former names: Riera de Santa Coloma; Empalme
- Original company: Compañía del Camino de Hierro del Norte; Camino de Hierro del Este

Services
Preceding station	Rodalies de Catalunya	Following station
Montmeló towards Castelldefels	R2	Terminus
Montmeló towards Barcelona–El Prat Airport	R2 Nord	Les Franqueses - Granollers Nord towards Maçanet-Massanes
Montmeló towards Martorell	R8	Terminus
Barcelona Sant Andreu Comtal Regional (R) services only towards Barcelona Sants	R11	Les Franqueses - Granollers Nord towards Cerbère
Location

Granollers Centre is a Rodalies de Catalunya railway station serving Granollers in Catalonia, Spain. It is located on the Barcelona–Cerbère railway, just next to the Granollers main square.

The station serves as the northern terminus of Barcelona commuter rail service lines R2 and R8 as well as a stop for all trains on commuter line R2 Nord and regional line R11.
