= Maçanet-Massanes railway station =

Railway station in Maçanet de la Selva, Spain

Maçanet-Massanes
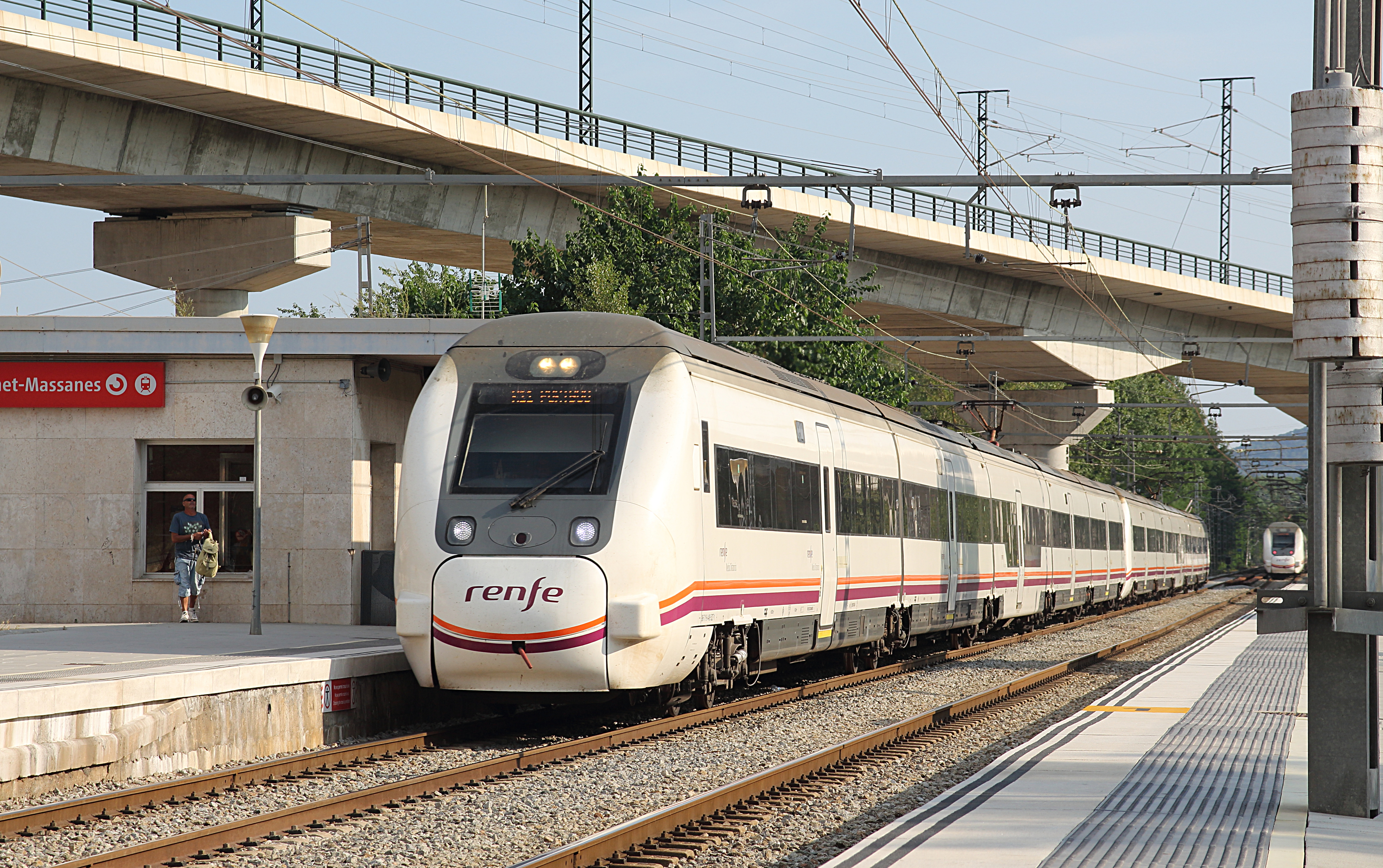
- A Renfe Operadora 449 series train making a service on Rodalies de Catalunya regional line R11 at the station in 2013. Note the viaduct of the Madrid–Barcelona–Figueres high-speed rail line crossing the station diagonally on the background.

General information
- Location: Estació de Ferrocarril (local road GI-562); 17412 Maçanet de la Selva; Catalonia; Spain
- Coordinates: 41°46′17.90″N 2°40′23.79″E
- System: Rodalies de Catalunya commuter and regional rail station
- Owner: Adif
- Operator: Renfe Operadora
- Lines: Barcelona–Cerbère (PK 175.9); Barcelona–Mataró–Maçanet-Massanes (PK 75.9)
- Platforms: 3 island platforms
- Tracks: 8
- Connections: Maçanet de la Selva local bus

Construction
- Structure type: At-grade
- Parking: Yes
- Cycle facilities: A bicycle parking rack is located adjacent to the station building.
- Accessible: Yes

Other information
- Station code: 79200
- Fare zone: 6G (ATM Àrea de Barcelona); 6 (ATM Àrea de Girona); 6 (Rodalies de Catalunya's Barcelona commuter rail service)

History
- Opened: 27 August 1860
- Former names: Riera de Santa Coloma; Empalme
- Original company: Compañía del Camino de Hierro del Norte; Camino de Hierro del Este
- Pre-nationalisation: Compañía de los Ferrocarriles de Madrid a Zaragoza y Alicante (MZA)

Services
Preceding station	Rodalies de Catalunya	Following station
Tordera towards Molins de Rei	R1	Terminus
Hostalric towards Barcelona–El Prat Airport	R2 Nord	Terminus
Tordera towards L'Hospitalet de Llobregat	RG1	Sils towards Portbou
Hostalric Regional (R) services only towards Barcelona Sants	R11	Sils towards Cerbère
Location

Maçanet-Massanes is a Rodalies de Catalunya open triangular railway station serving Maçanet de la Selva and Massanes, in Catalonia, Spain. It is located at the junction where the railway coming from Barcelona via Mataró converges with the Barcelona–Cerbère railway, lying about 5 and 1.9 kilometres (3.1 and 1.2 mi) away from the urban centers of Maçanet de la Selva and Massanes, respectively. On the Barcelona–Cerbère railway, the station is between Hostalric and Sils, and it is the northern terminus of the railway coming from Mataró.

The station serves as the northern terminus of Barcelona commuter rail service lines R1 and R2 Nord as well as a stop for all trains on regional line R11. On 24 March 2014, Girona commuter rail service line RG1 also started services, providing a direct connection between the Maresme and the Girona areas without having to interchange at this station.

Under the name "Riera de Santa Coloma", the station was first opened on 27 August 1860 with the construction of the Barcelona–Portbou Railway on its section from Granollers to this location, which was carried out by Compañía del Camino de Hierro del Norte ("Northern Railway Company"). One year later, on 1 August 1861, Camino de Hierro del Este ("Eastern Railway") opened the extension of the Barcelona–Mataró Railway from Arenys de Mar to the already existing station, leading to the connection of both railways.

In September 2011, Adif, the owner of the station, concluded the refurbishment of the station in order to make it accessible. This operation involved the installation of elevators and the renovation of the platforms, including the construction of a new station building on the easternmost side of the tracks.

== Railways ==
- Barcelona–Cerbère railway, route number 270.
- Barcelona–Mataró–Maçanet-Massanes railway, route number 276.
