= Castelldefels railway station =

Train station in Catalonia, Spain

Castelldefels
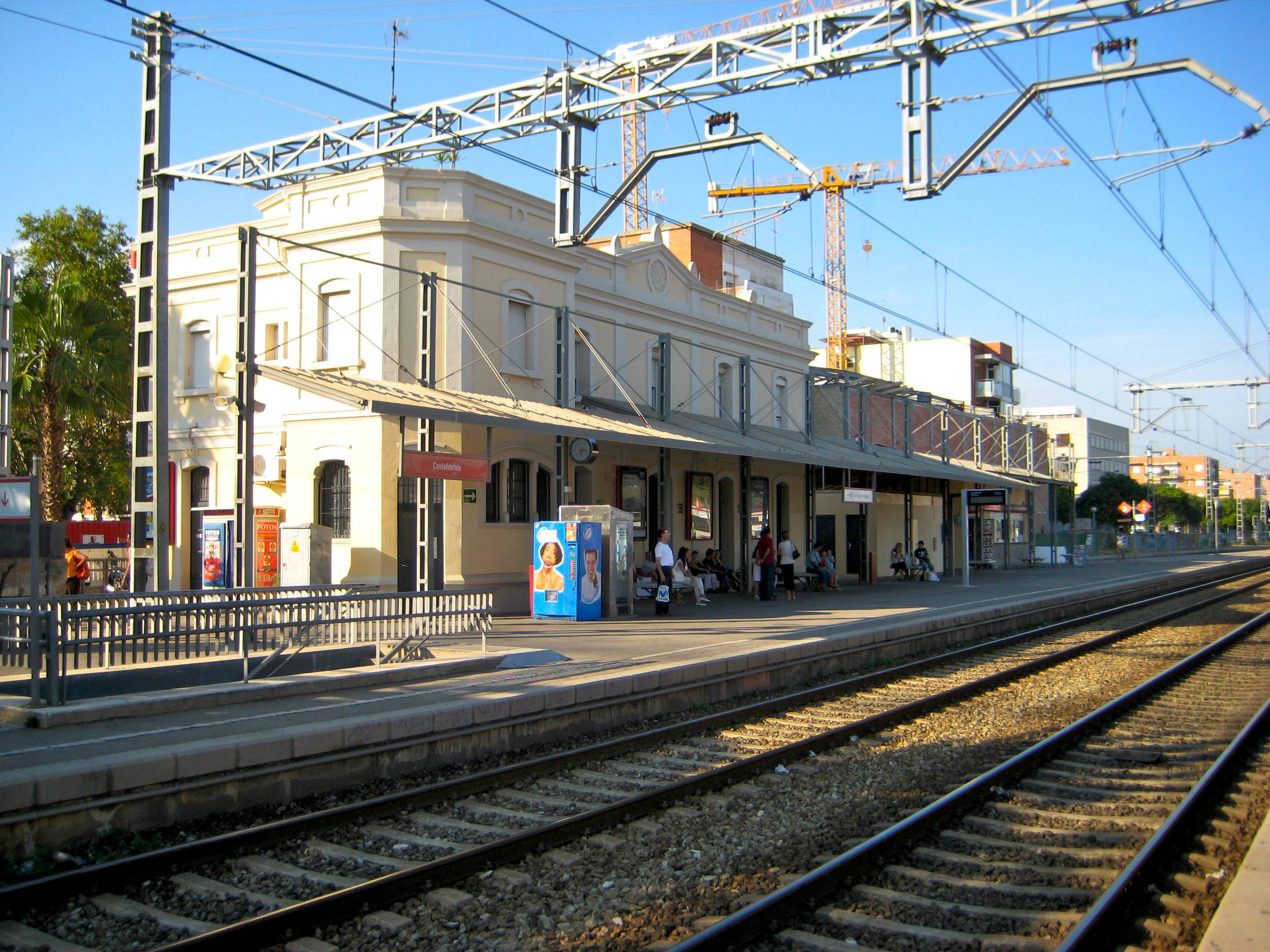

General information
- Location: Plaça de l'Estació; 08860 Castelldefels; Spain
- Coordinates: 41°16′44″N 1°58′45.27″E
- System: Rodalies de Catalunya commuter and regional rail station
- Owner: Adif
- Operator: Renfe Operadora
- Line: Madrid–Barcelona (PK 658.9)
- Platforms: 2 island platforms
- Tracks: 4 (3 with platform)
- Connections: Local and night buses

Construction
- Structure type: At-grade

Other information
- Station code: 71705
- Fare zone: 1 (ATM Àrea de Barcelona); 2 (Rodalies de Catalunya's Barcelona commuter rail service)

History
- Opened: 1881

Services
Preceding station	Rodalies de Catalunya	Following station
Terminus	R2	Gavà towards Granollers Centre
Platja de Castelldefels Some trains only towards Sant Vicenç de Calders	R2 Sud	Gavà towards Barcelona Estació de França
Sitges Some Regional (R) trains only towards Lleida Pirineus	R13	Gavà Some Regional (R) trains only towards Barcelona Estació de França
Sitges Some Regional (R) trains only towards Lleida Pirineus	R14	Gavà Some Regional (R) trains only towards Barcelona Estació de França
Sitges Some Regional (R) trains only towards Riba-roja d'Ebre	R15	Gavà Some Regional (R) trains only towards Barcelona Estació de França
Location

Castelldefels is a Rodalies de Catalunya railway station serving Castelldefels, in Catalonia, Spain. It is served by Barcelona commuter rail service lines R2 and R2 Sud, as well as some trains on regional lines R13, R14 and R15.

The station has five platforms: platforms 1 and 2 are the through platforms, platform 4 is for trains terminating or starting at the station, and platforms 3 and 5 are bay platforms, sometimes used by trains at the beginning or end of service.

The stations on either side are Gavà (heading towards Barcelona) and Platja de Castelldefels (heading away from Barcelona).
