= Flaçà railway station =

Railway station in Flaçà, Spain

Flaçà
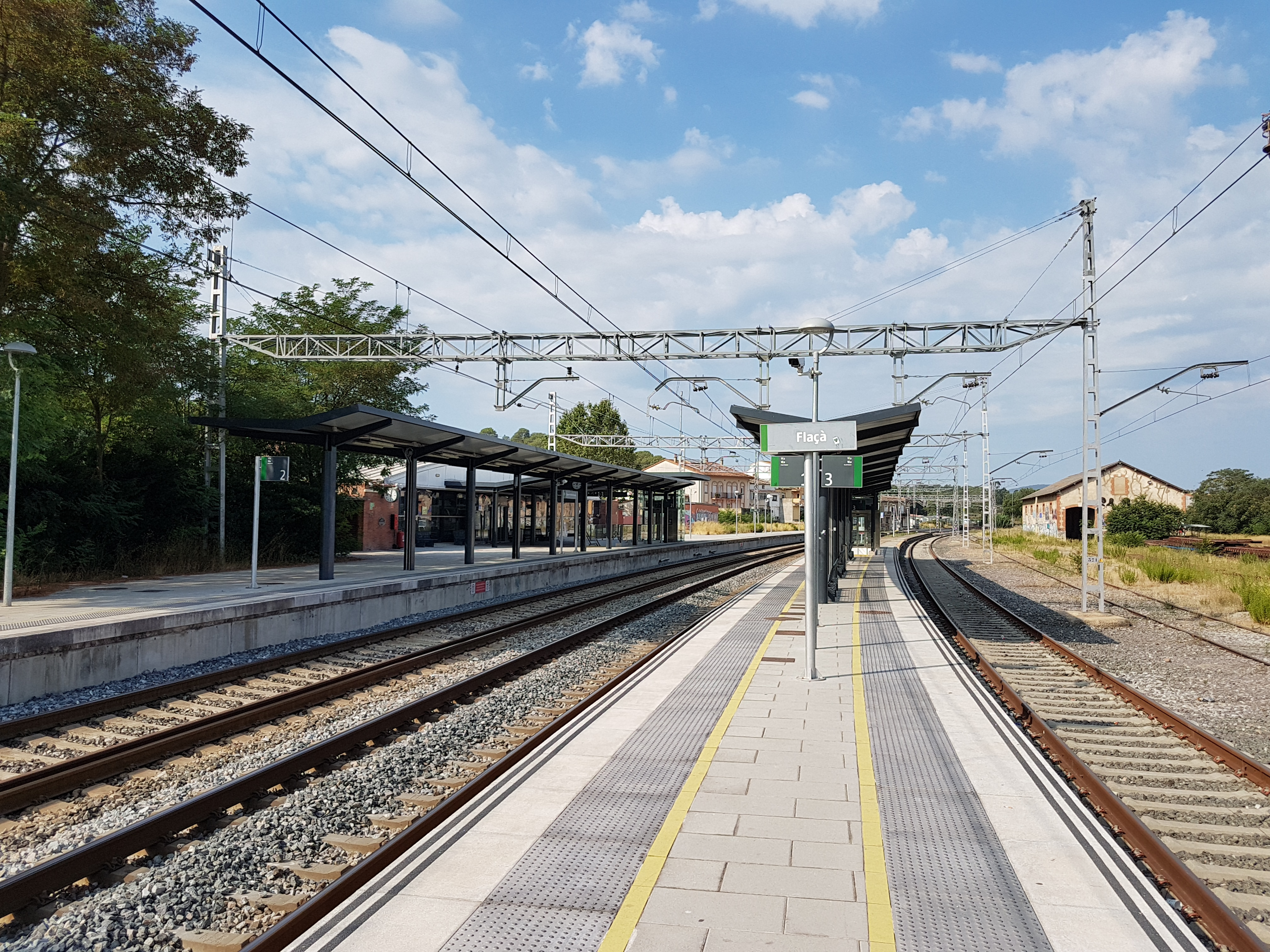
- Flaçà Railway Station.

General information
- Location: Plaça de l'Estació, la Bolla, Flaçà; Catalonia; Spain
- Coordinates: 42.04744°N 2.95742°E
- System: Rodalies de Catalunya commuter and regional rail station
- Owner: Adif
- Operator: Renfe Operadora

History
- Opened: 1877
Location

Flaçà station is a railway station owned by Adif located in the municipality of Flaçà, in the comarca of Gironès, Catalonia. The station lies on the Barcelona–Cerbère railway and is served by trains of the R11 regional line and the RG1 commuter line, both operated by Renfe Operadora.

The building is listed in the Inventory of the Architectural Heritage of Catalonia.

In 2016 the station registered 164,000 passenger entries.

== History ==
The section of the line between Girona and Figueres was inaugurated on 17 December 1877, built by the Companyia dels Ferrocarrils de Tarragona a Barcelona i França (TBF). Due to its location, Flaçà soon became an important junction, providing connections to the Baix Empordà and Costa Brava.

Nearby, the station of the narrow-gauge Palamós–Girona–Banyoles railway was established, now disappeared, which further increased the area's importance.

== Station building ==
The station follows the architectural model used for many stations on this line at the time, with a passenger building and a freight dock. It replaced earlier buildings with more functional constructions.

The building has a rectangular floor plan with a gable roof covered in flat tiles. It features a wide canopy supported by wooden beams, brick walls, and prominent structural elements visible on the façades. Service and storage buildings of the same style and period are also preserved.

== Train services ==
Flaçà is served by:

- R11: regional services between Barcelona Sants and Cerbère.
- RG1: commuter services connecting the Costa Brava and central Girona area.

Serveis regionals de Rodalies de Catalunya
Origin/Destination	Preceding station	Rodalies de Catalunya	Following station	Origin/Destination
Barcelona- Sants	Girona Bordils-Juià		Figueres Sant Jordi Desvalls	Cerbère Portbou
Mataró	Bordils-Juià		Sant Jordi Desvalls	Portbou

== Projects ==
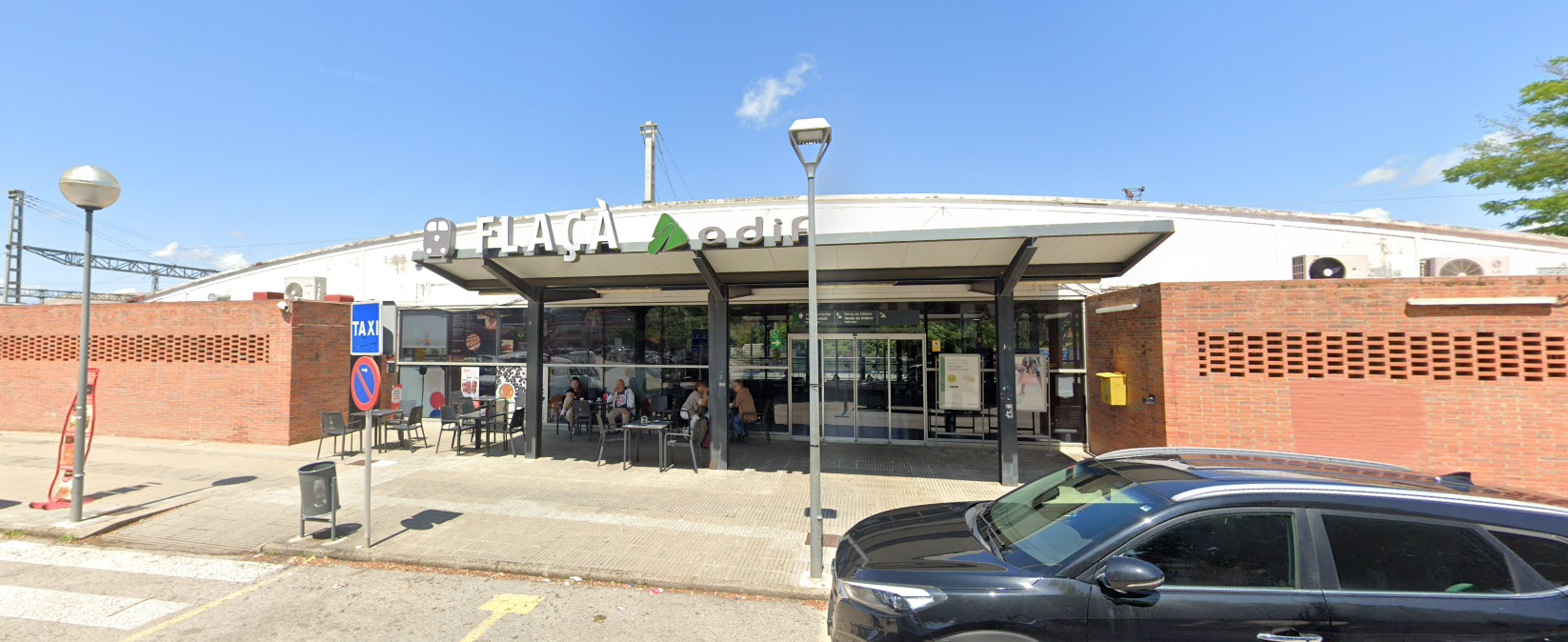
Flaça station building

Plans have been proposed for the creation of the TramGavarres, a tram-train service using the existing section between Riudellots and Flaçà to form a rail loop connecting central Gironès and the Costa Brava.

The local chamber of commerce recommended that the planned freight bypass at Girona include Celrà, Bordils-Juià and Flaçà stations to avoid congestion in the commuter network.

== See also ==
- Rail transport in Catalonia
