= Bordils-Juià railway station =

Railway station in Bordils, Spain

Bordils-Juià

General information
- Location: Plaça de l'Estació, Bordils; Catalonia; Spain
- Coordinates: 42.03706°N 2.91525°E
- System: Rodalies de Catalunya commuter and regional rail station
- Owner: Adif
- Operator: Renfe Operadora

History
- Opened: 1887
Location

Bordils-Juià railway station, also known simply as Bordils, is a railway station owned by Adif and located south of the municipality of Bordils, in the comarca of Gironès, Catalonia, Spain. The station lies on the Barcelona–Cerbère railway and is served by trains of the R11 regional line and the RG1 commuter line, both operated by Renfe Operadora.

The station opened in 1877 with the inauguration of the section between Girona and Figueres, built by the Companyia dels Ferrocarrils de Tarragona a Barcelona i França (TBF).

Before 2007 most regional trains did not stop at Bordils-Juià. The local association "Plataforma El Tren Viu" campaigned for more regional trains to call here and for the station to be included in a proposed commuter rail network for Girona. Complaints also included the lack of a ticket office, ticket vending machines, and shelters. The station has no underground pedestrian crossing.

In 2016 the station registered 7,000 passenger entries.

== Train services ==
Bordils-Juià is served by:

- R11: regional services between Barcelona Sants and Cerbère.
- RG1: commuter services connecting the Costa Brava and central Girona area.

Serveis regionals de Rodalies de Catalunya
Origin/Destination	Preceding station	Rodalies de Catalunya	Following station	Origin/Destination
Barcelona- Sants	Girona Celrà		Figueres Flaçà	Cerbère Portbou
Mataró	Celrà		Flaçà	Portbou

== Proposed commuter rail ==
The Pla de Transport de Viatgers de Catalunya 2008–2012 envisaged a commuter rail network in the Girona area, with Bordils-Juià as one of its stations.

== Other projects ==
Bordils-Juià would also be affected by the creation of the TramGavarres (tram-train service) using the existing section between Riudellots and Flaçà to create a rail loop connecting central Gironès and the Costa Brava.

== Girona freight bypass ==
The local Chamber of Commerce recommended that the planned freight bypass at Girona should include Celrà, Bordils-Juià and Flaçà stations to avoid congestion when the commuter rail system is implemented.

== See also ==
- Rail transport in Catalonia
- Renfe Operadora
