= R1–RG1 (Rodalies de Catalunya) =

Part of Barcelona's commuter rail service

R1 RG1

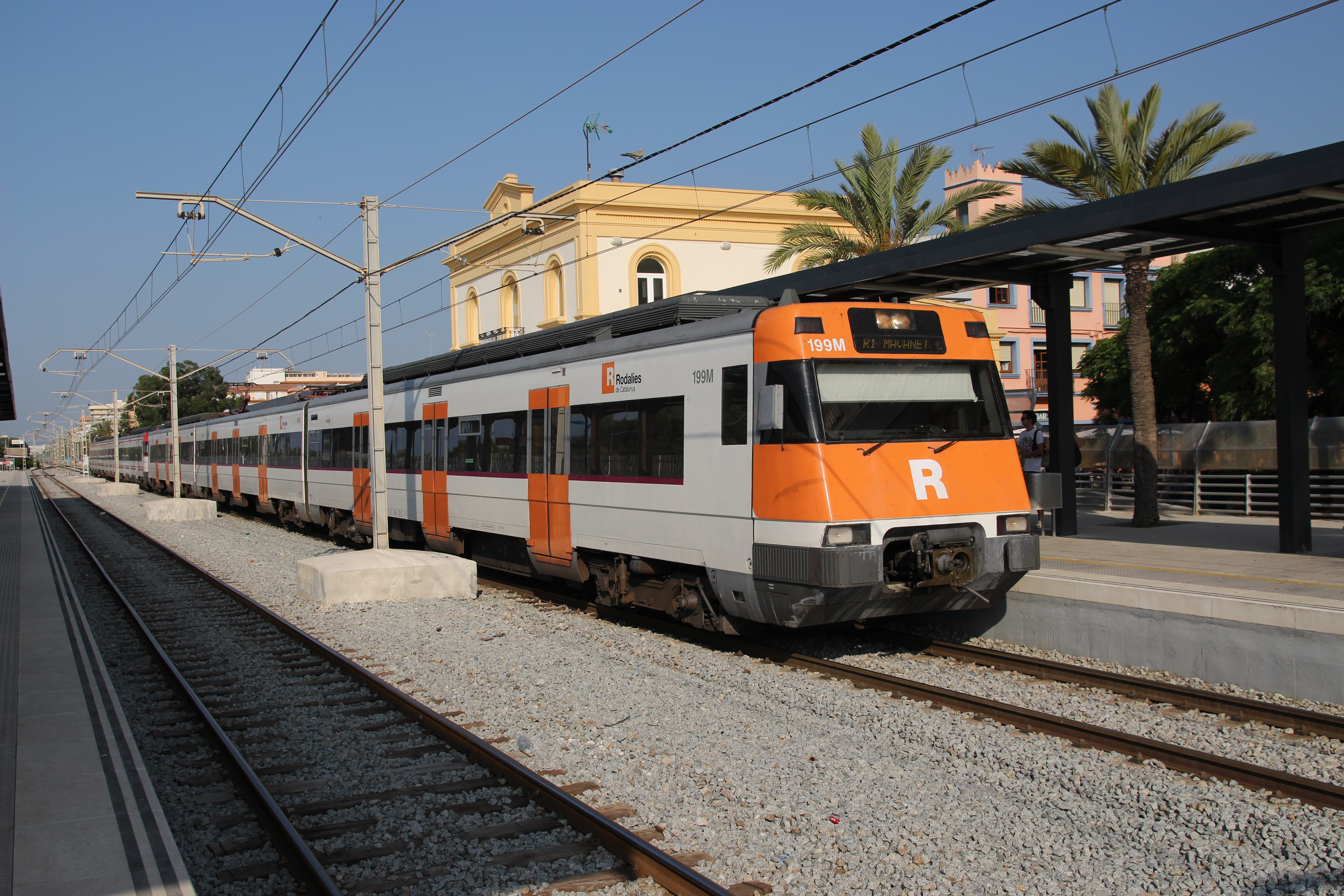
- A 447 Series train on a R1 service at Malgrat de Mar in 2013.

Overview
- Service type: Commuter rail
- Status: Operational
- Locale: Barcelona metropolitan area and province of Girona
- First service: R1: 1989; RG1: 24 March 2014
- Current operator(s): Renfe Operadora
- Ridership: 102,214 (2008) (Note: Note that 2008 ridership figures do not include data for the RG1 because it had not been created yet.)
- Annual ridership: 28 million (2016)

Route
- Termini: R1: Molins de Rei; RG1: L'Hospitalet de Llobregat; R1: Maçanet-Massanes; RG1: Portbou
- Stops: R1: 31; RG1: 44
- Distance travelled: R1: 95.1 km (59.1 mi); RG1: 181.2 km (112.6 mi)
- Average journey time: R1: 55 min–1 h 50 min; RG1: 2 h 55 min–3 h 18 min
- Service frequency: Every 6 min–4 h
- Line(s) used: Sant Vicenç de Calders–Barcelona; Lleida–Barcelona; Barcelona–Massanes; Barcelona–Cerbère

Technical
- Rolling stock: Civia and 447 Series EMUs
- Track gauge: 1,668 mm (5 ft 5 21/32 in) Iberian gauge
- Electrification: 3,000 V DC overhead lines
- Track owner(s): Adif

The R1 is a line of Rodalies de Catalunya's Barcelona commuter rail service, operated by Renfe Operadora. It runs northwards from the Barcelona area to the southern limits of the province of Girona, passing through the coastal Maresme region. Since 2014, some services have been extended further north towards Portbou, near the French border. These services are designated RG1 and are considered part of the Girona commuter rail service. The line had an annual ridership of 28 million in 2016, achieving an average weekday ridership of 102,214 according to 2008 data.

R1–RG1 trains primarily run on the Barcelona–Mataró–Maçanet-Massanes railway, the first railway line in the Iberian Peninsula. They use the Meridiana Tunnel in Barcelona, where they share tracks with Rodalies de Catalunya's Barcelona commuter rail service lines R3 and R4, as well as regional rail line R12, calling at Sants, Plaça de Catalunya and Arc de Triomf stations. R1 services use Molins de Rei as their southernmost terminus and Maçanet-Massanes as their northernmost one. On the other hand, no RG1 services run south of L'Hospitalet de Llobregat, or north of Portbou.

Together with lines R2, R3, and R4, the R1 (then simply numbered line 1) started services in 1989 as one of the first lines of the Cercanías commuter rail system for Barcelona, known as Rodalia Barcelona. Originally, R1 services had two southern termini, L'Hospitalet de Llobregat and Barcelona–El Prat Airport stations. In 2005, all trains terminating at the airport moved their southern terminus to Molins de Rei. In the long-term future, it is projected that the R1 will take over the southern section of line R2, creating a major north–south axis that will extend along the coast of the Barcelona metropolitan area.

== History ==
The current line scheme of the R1 started operating on 28 May 1989, after the dismantling of the former route of the Barcelona–Mataró–Maçanet-Massanes railway through the Barcelona neighborhood of Poblenou. Earlier, all the commuter rail services coming from Mataró used the route through Poblenou, terminating at Estació de les Rodalies, a terminus station that was located adjacent to the still existing Estació de França. All services coming from Mataró were then rerouted through the Sagrera rail complex and the Meridiana Tunnel to access Barcelona, terminating at L'Hospitalet de Llobregat or Barcelona–El Prat Airport stations, depending on the station of origin. The services coming from Mataró terminated at the airport, whilst the services coming from north of Mataró terminated at L'Hospitalet de Llobregat. Since the new through line scheme offered more stops within Barcelona and better connections with the city's metro system, the line's ridership doubled. Throughout 1989, this new line scheme was incorporated as part of line 1 of Rodalia Barcelona (predecessor of the R1), the Cercanías commuter rail system for the Barcelona area, created in the same year.

On 4 December 2005, the services between Mataró and the airport were suspended due to the construction works of the Madrid–Barcelona high-speed rail line in Barcelona's southern access, leaving the airport without any direct trains to Barcelona. These services moved their southern terminus from the airport to Molins de Rei, originating the line's current termini. The R1 also started operating as a shuttle line between the airport and El Prat de Llobregat railway station until 22 July 2006, when line R10 was created, providing a direct rail link between the airport and central Barcelona anew.

== Infrastructure ==
Like the rest of Rodalies de Catalunya lines, the R1–RG1 runs on the Iberian gauge mainline railway system, which is owned by Adif, an agency of the Spanish government. All of the railway lines carrying Rodalies de Catalunya services are electrified at 3,000 volts (V) direct current (DC) using overhead lines. The R1–RG1 operates on a total line length of 181.2 kilometres (112.6 mi), which is entirely double-track, excepting for the single-track section between Arenys de Mar and Maçanet-Massanes stations. The trains on the line call at up to 48 stations, using the following railway lines, in order from south to north:

From	To	Railway line	Route number
Molins de Rei (PK 85.3)	L'Hospitalet de Llobregat (PK 95.2)	Sant Vicenç de Calders–Vilafranca del Penedès–Barcelona	240
L'Hospitalet de Llobregat (PK 95.2)	Vilanova Junction (PK 365.4) (after Arc de Triomf station)	Lleida–Manresa–Barcelona	220
Vilanova Junction (PK 108.2)	Glòries Junction (PK 109.1) (before El Clot-Aragó station)	Glòries branch	266
Glòries Junction (PK 109.1)	Barcelona Sagrera (PK 112.2)	Barcelona–Mataró–Maçanet-Massanes	262
Barcelona Sagrera (PK 0)	Maçanet-Massanes (PK 75.3)	Barcelona–Mataró–Maçanet-Massanes	276
Maçanet-Massanes (PK 175.9)	Portbou (PK 273.1)	Barcelona–Cerbère	270

The entire length of the Barcelona–Mataró–Maçanet-Massanes railway is solely used by the R1–RG1, though the rest of the infrastructure it uses is shared with other services. South of L'Hospitalet de Llobregat, it shares tracks with Rodalies de Catalunya's Barcelona commuter rail service line R4. Between L'Hospitalet de Llobregat and Arc de Triomf stations, R1 and RG1 trains share tracks with commuter rail lines R3 and R4, and regional rail line R12, using the Meridiana Tunnel through central Barcelona. After Arc de Triomf, they branch off to El Clot-Aragó railway station, running on exclusive tracks from this point on to Maçanet-Massanes. North of Maçanet-Massanes, the R1–RG1 shares tracks with regional line R11 and freight services.

In May 2015, Adif announced that the R1–RG1 would be the first Rodalies de Catalunya line to feature the European Rail Traffic Management System (ERTMS) signaling and security system. ERTMS Level 2 will be installed on the 56-kilometre-long (35 mi) section between L'Hospitalet de Llobregat and Mataró, increasing capacity and reliability parameters.

== Operation ==
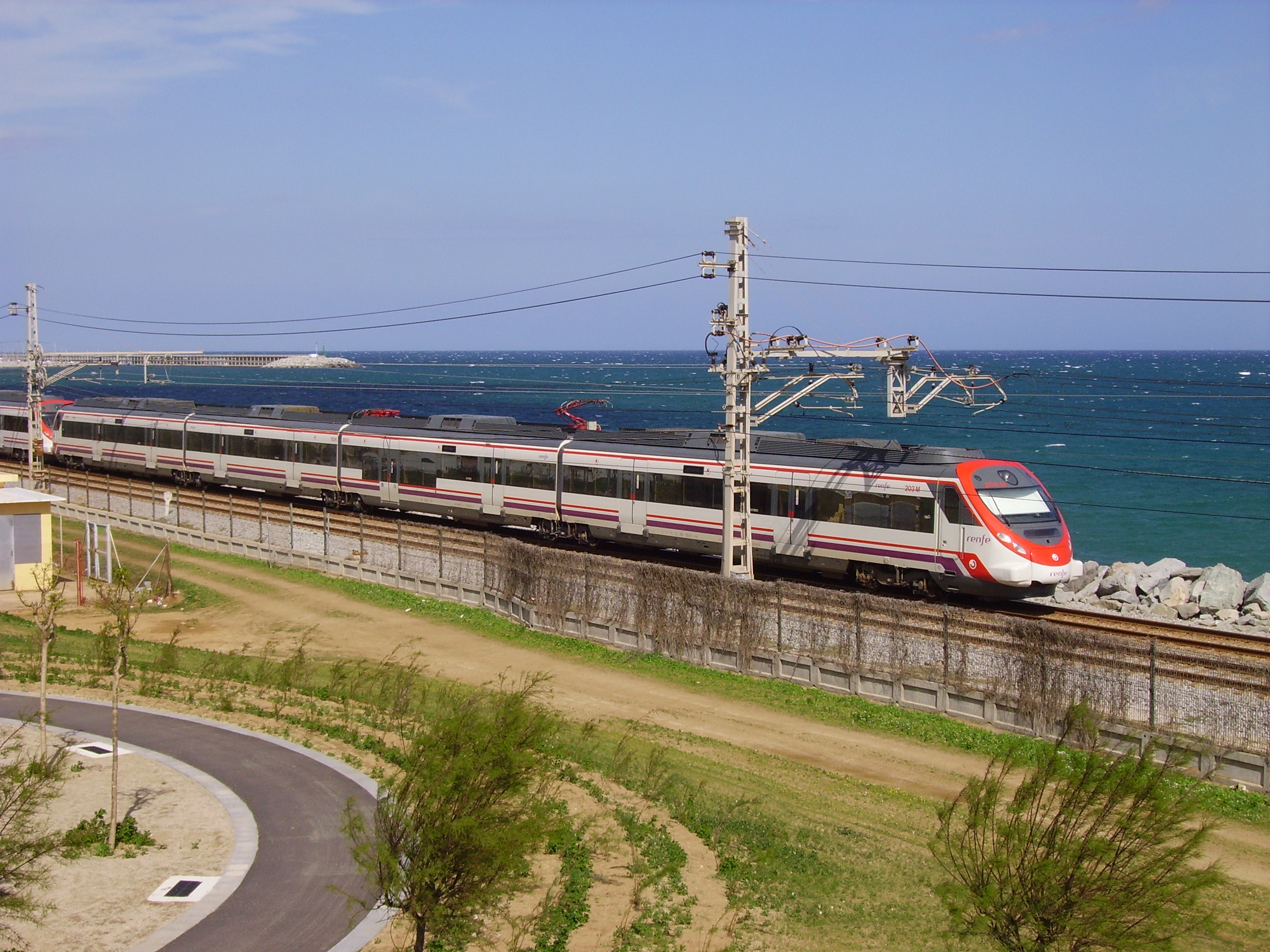
A Civia train on a R1 service near Mataró in 2007.

There are no end-to-end services between Molins de Rei and Portbou stations on the R1–RG1, which means only partial services operate on the line. The services commencing or terminating at Molins de Rei do not usually run north of Mataró or Arenys de Mar. On the other hand, most services commencing or terminating at L'Hospitalet de Llobregat run north of Arenys de Mar, using Calella, Blanes, Maçanet-Massanes, Figueres or Portbou stations as their northern terminus, in order from south to north. Furthermore, since 31 January 2009, there have been no limited services, so that the entirety of R1 and RG1 trains call at all stations. Previously, some R1 trains had operated limited services, skipping Montgat, Montgat Nord, and Cabrera de Mar-Vilassar de Mar stations. The first trains run about 5:00 in the morning, with the latest arriving at about 1:00 at night.

The designation of the services operating on the line depends on the route they operate. The services between Molins de Rei and Maçanet-Massanes are designated R1 in coordination with the rest of Barcelona commuter rail service lines, whilst the services between L'Hospitalet de Llobregat and other stations located further north of Maçanet-Massanes are designated RG1 (the letter 'G' stands for Girona) to indicate that they are part of the Girona commuter rail service. RG1 services began operating on 20 March 2014 after former R1 services between L'Hospitalet de Llobregat and Maçanet-Massanes were extended northwards to Figueres. Since 20 June 2014, some of these services have been extended further north to Portbou.

As of July 2015, the service routes operating on the R1–RG1 are as follows:

Line	Route	No. of stations	Journey time	Days of operation	Notes
	Molins de Rei – Mataró	19	1 h 9 min	Mon–Fri	Calls at all stations along its route. Some trains operated limited service prior to January 2009.
	Molins de Rei – Arenys de Mar	22	1 h 19 min	Mon–Fri	Calls at all stations along its route. Some trains operated limited service prior to January 2009.
	L'Hospitalet de Llobregat – Mataró	15	55 min	Daily	Calls at all stations along its route. Some trains operated limited service prior to January 2009.
	L'Hospitalet de Llobregat – Arenys de Mar	18	1 h 6 min	Mon–Fri	Calls at all stations along its route. Some trains operated limited service prior to January 2009.
	L'Hospitalet de Llobregat – Calella	21	1 h 21 min	Mon–Fri	Calls at all stations along its route. Some trains operated limited service prior to January 2009.
	L'Hospitalet de Llobregat – Blanes	25	1 h 37 min	Daily	Calls at all stations along its route. Some trains operated limited service prior to January 2009.
	L'Hospitalet de Llobregat – Maçanet-Massanes	27	1 h 50 min	Daily	Calls at all stations along its route. Some trains operated limited service prior to January 2009.
	L'Hospitalet de Llobregat – Figueres	40	2 h 55 min	Mon–Fri	Calls at all stations along its route.
	L'Hospitalet de Llobregat – Portbou	44	3 h 18 min	Mon–Fri (Note: During the summer season, 3 daily L'Hospitalet de Llobregat–Portbou services are offered on weekends.)	Calls at all stations along its route.

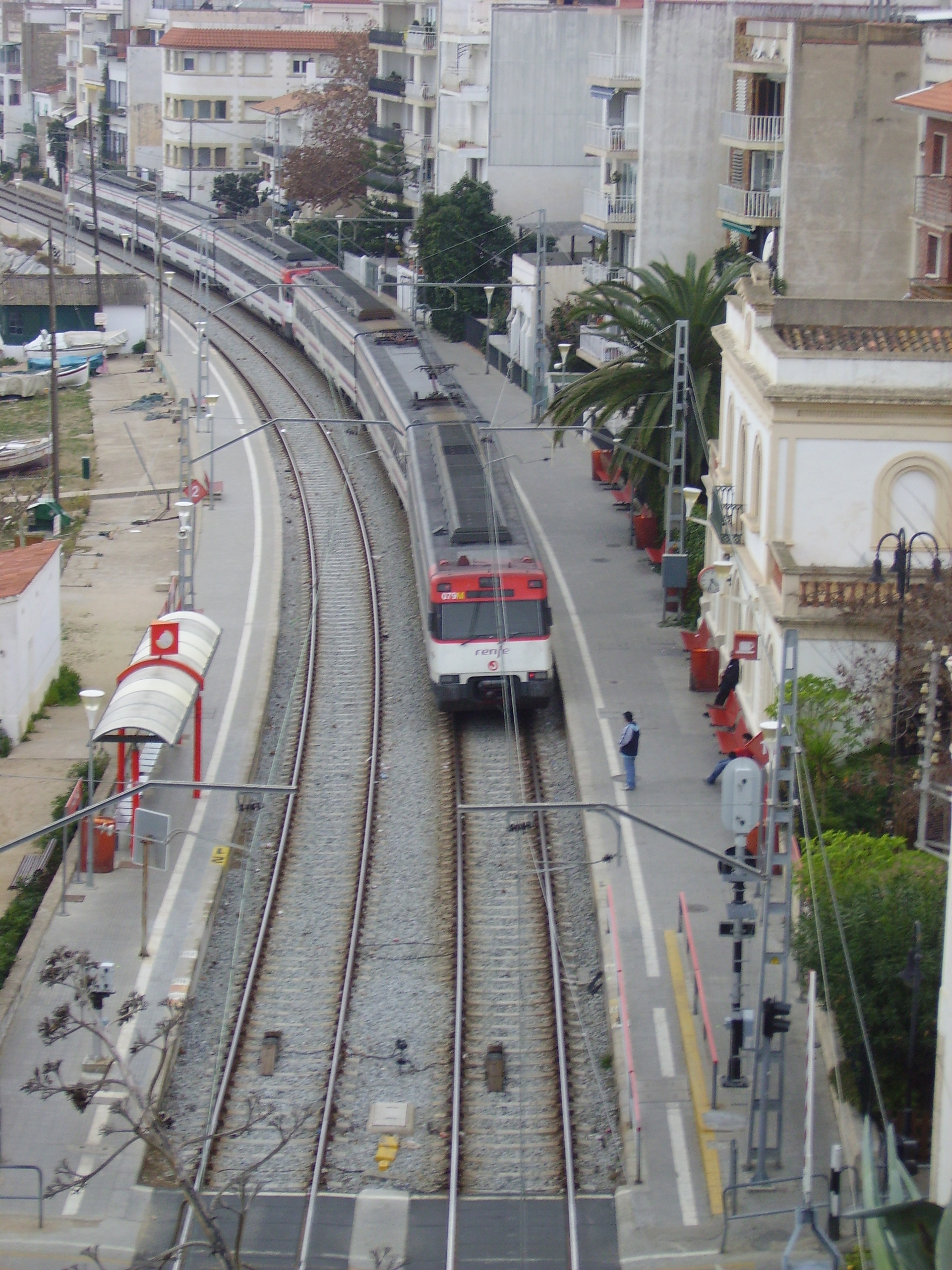
A 447 Series train on a R1 service at Sant Pol de Mar in 2007.

The line's activity gathers on the section between L'Hospitalet de Llobregat and Mataró, where a peak-time frequency of 6 minutes has been offered since 26 June 2011, that is the highest on any line of the Rodalies de Catalunya system. The service frequency reduces as the line moves away from Barcelona, especially on the section north of Maçanet-Massanes, where only RG1 services operate on weekdays, and which is already served by regional rail line R11. Moreover, the R1 does not operate south of L'Hospitalet de Llobregat on weekends, when this section is solely served by Barcelona commuter rail service line R4.

As of July 2015, the approximate service frequencies on the R1–RG1 are as follows:

Section	Frequency			
Section	RH	MD	OP	WE
Molins de Rei – L'Hospitalet de Llobregat	30′	30′	30′	—
L'Hospitalet de Llobregat – Mataró	6′	10′	12′	15′
Mataró – Arenys de Mar	6′	10′	30′	30′
Arenys de Mar – Calella	15′	30′	30′	30′
Calella – Blanes	15′	30′	30′	30′
Blanes – Maçanet-Massanes	30′	60′	60′	60′
Maçanet-Massanes – Figueres	120′	120′	120′	—
Figueres – Portbou	240′	240′	240′	—

The trains used on the R1–RG1 are Civia—specifically, the 463, 464 and 465 Series, which consist of three, four and five cars per set, respectively—and 447 Series electrical multiple units (EMU). Civia trains have been running on the line since July 2006, initially only operating services between Molins de Rei and Calella. On average, these trains operate a total of 216 services on the line every day on weekdays, accounting for a ridership of 102,214, according to 2008 data.

== Future ==
The 2008–2015 Rail Infrastructure Master Plan for the Barcelona Commuter Rail Service, developed by the Spanish Ministry of Public Works and Transport, plans to establish a "coast-to-coast" and "inland-to-inland" line scheme. According to this project, the current R1 will be extended southwards from Barcelona Sants to Sant Vicenç de Calders stations, via Vilanova i la Geltrú, taking over the southern section of the present line R2. The R1 will become the "coast-to-coast" line, creating a new major south–north axis along the coast of the Barcelona metropolitan area. R1 trains will continue to use the Meridiana Tunnel in central Barcelona with the new line scheme, which is currently not possible due to the configuration of the southern rail accesses to Barcelona Sants. A long-term project with an uncertain completion date, the new configuration would require multimillion-euro investments since it is associated with the construction of a new underground route in L'Hospitalet de Llobregat for the Rodalies de Catalunya lines running through the city as well as the new rail link for Barcelona–El Prat Airport.

As stated in the master plan, the proposed peak-time service frequencies for the future R1 would be as follows:

Section	tph
Sant Vicenç de Calders – Vilanova i la Geltrú	6
Vilanova i la Geltrú – Mataró	12
Mataró – Blanes	6
Blanes – Maçanet-Massanes	3

== List of stations ==
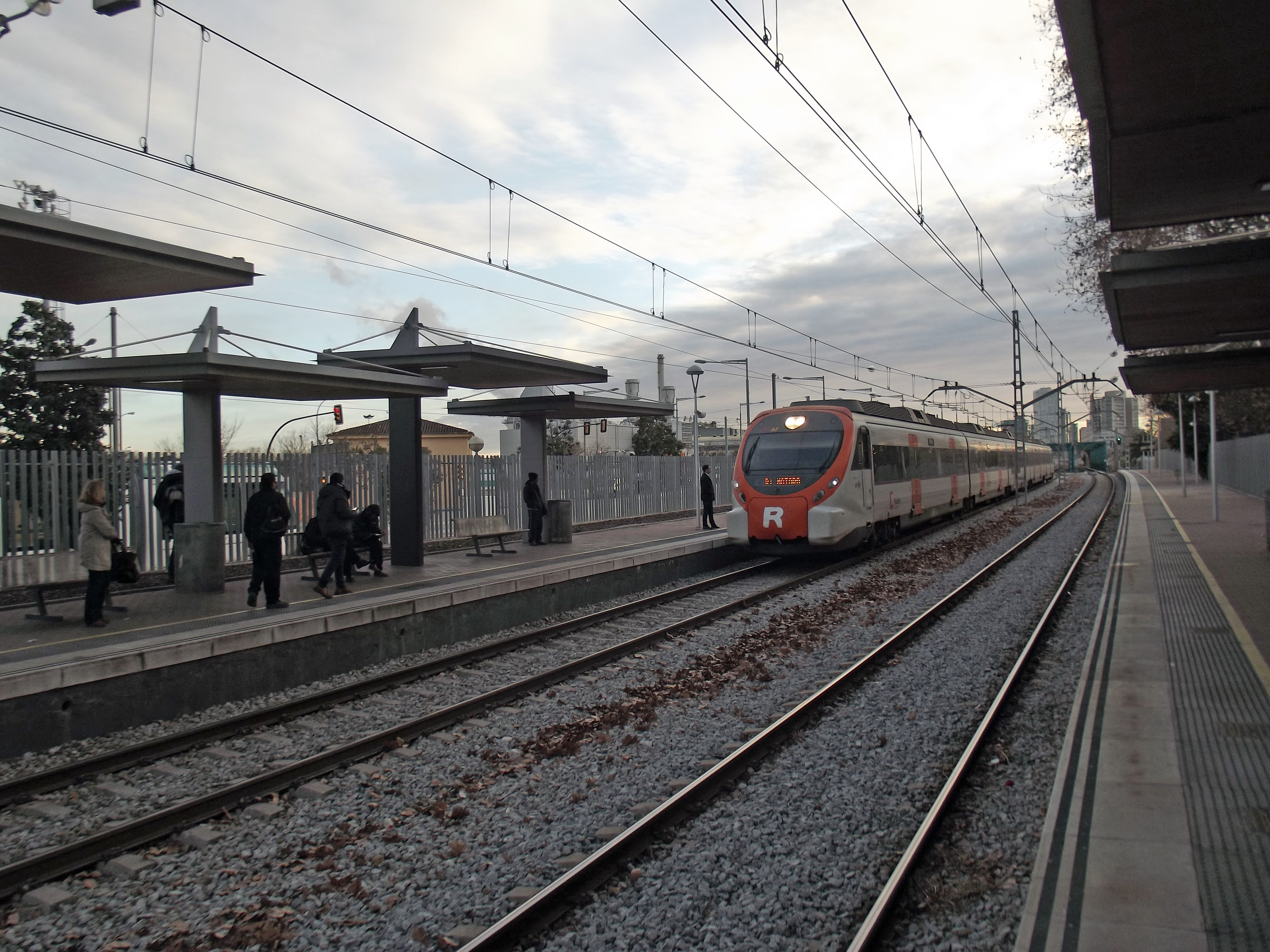
A Civia train on a R1 service at Sant Adrià de Besòs railway station in 2013.

The following table lists the name of each station served by line R1–RG1 in order from south to north; the station's service pattern offered by R1 and/or RG1 trains; the transfers to other Rodalies de Catalunya lines, including both commuter and regional rail services; remarkable transfers to other transport systems; the municipality in which each station is located; and the fare zone(s) each station belongs to according to the Autoritat del Transport Metropolità (ATM Àrea de Barcelona) and the Autoritat Territorial de la Mobilitat de l'Àrea de Girona (ATM Àrea de Girona) fare-integrated public transport systems, as well as Rodalies de Catalunya's own fare zone system for Barcelona commuter rail service lines.

#	Terminal of a service
*	Transfer station to other transport systems
#*	Transfer station and terminal
●	Station served by all trains running through it
○	Limited service station

Station	Service		Rodalies de Catalunya transfers	Other transfers	Municipality	Fare zone		
Station	R1	RG1	Rodalies de Catalunya transfers	Other transfers	Municipality	ATM AdB	ATM AdG	Rod
Molins de Rei#	●		R4	—	Molins de Rei	2B	—	2
Sant Feliu de Llobregat	●		R4	—	Sant Feliu de Llobregat	1	—	2
Sant Joan Despí	●		R4	—	Sant Joan Despí	1	—	1
Cornellà*	●		R4	Barcelona Metro line 5 Trambaix light rail services	Cornellà de Llobregat	1	—	1
L'Hospitalet de Llobregat#*	●	●	R3, R4, R12	Barcelona Metro line 1 at Rambla Just Oliveras station	L'Hospitalet de Llobregat	1	—	1
Barcelona Sants*	●	●	R2, R2 Nord, R2 Sud, R3, R4, R11, R12, R13, R14, R15, R16	Renfe Operadora-operated high-speed and long-distance rail services TGV high-speed rail services Barcelona Metro lines 3 and 5 at Sants Estació station National and international coach services	Barcelona	1	—	1
Barcelona Plaça de Catalunya*	●	●	R3, R4, R12	Barcelona Metro lines 1, 3, 6 and 7 Vallès Metro commuter rail services	Barcelona	1	—	1
Barcelona Arc de Triomf*	●	●	R3, R4, R12	Barcelona Metro line 1 National and international coach services at Estació del Nord	Barcelona	1	—	1
Barcelona El Clot-Aragó*	●	●	R2, R2 Nord, R11	Barcelona Metro lines 1 and 2	Barcelona	1	—	1
Sant Adrià de Besòs*	●	●	—	Trambesòs light rail services	Sant Adrià de Besòs	1	—	1
Badalona	●	●	—	—	Badalona	1	—	1
Montgat	●	●	—	—	Montgat	1	—	1
Montgat Nord	●	●	—	—	Montgat	1	—	1
El Masnou	●	●	—	—	El Masnou	2E	—	2
Ocata	●	●	—	—	El Masnou	2E	—	2
Premià de Mar	●	●	—	—	Premià de Mar	2E	—	3
Vilassar de Mar	●	●	—	—	Vilassar de Mar	2E	—	3
Cabrera de Mar-Vilassar de Mar	●	●	—	—	Cabrera de Mar	2E	—	3
Mataró#	●	●	—	—	Mataró	3E	—	4
Sant Andreu de Llavaneres	●	●	—	—	Sant Andreu de Llavaneres	3E	—	4
Caldes d'Estrac	●	●	—	—	Caldes d'Estrac	3E	—	4
Arenys de Mar#	●	●	—	—	Arenys de Mar	4H	—	4
Canet de Mar	●	●	—	—	Canet de Mar	4H	—	4
Sant Pol de Mar	●	●	—	—	Sant Pol de Mar	4H	—	5
Calella#	●	●	—	—	Calella	4H	—	5
Pineda de Mar	●	●	—	—	Pineda de Mar	4H	—	5
Santa Susanna	●	●	—	—	Santa Susanna	5H	—	5
Malgrat de Mar	●	●	—	—	Malgrat de Mar	5H	—	5
Blanes#*	●	●	—	Shuttle bus to Lloret de Mar and Tossa de Mar	Blanes	5H	—	6
Tordera	●	●	—	—	Tordera	5H	—	6
Maçanet-Massanes#	●	●	R2 Nord, R11	—	Maçanet de la Selva	6G	6	6
Sils		●	R11	—	Sils	—	6	—
Caldes de Malavella		●	R11	—	Caldes de Malavella	—	6, 7	—
Riudellots		●	R11	—	Riudellots de la Selva	—	1	—
Fornells de la Selva		●	R11	—	Fornells de la Selva	—	1	—
Girona*		●	R11	Renfe Operadora-operated high-speed rail services TGV high-speed rail services National and international coach services	Girona	—	1	—
Celrà		●	R11	—	Celrà	—	1, 2	—
Bordils-Juià		●	R11	—	Bordils	—	2	—
Flaçà		●	R11	—	Flaçà	—	2	—
Sant Jordi Desvalls		●	R11	—	Sant Jordi Desvalls	—	2	—
Camallera		●	R11	—	Saus, Camallera i Llampaies	—	—	—
Sant Miquel de Fluvià		●	R11	—	Sant Miquel de Fluvià	—	—	—
Vilamalla		●	R11	—	Vilamalla	—	—	—
Figueres#		●	R11	—	Figueres	—	—	—
Vilajuïga		●	R11	—	Vilajuïga	—	—	—
Llançà		●	R11	—	Llançà	—	—	—
Colera		●	R11	—	Colera	—	—	—
Portbou#*		●	R11	Intercités long-distance rail services TER Languedoc-Roussillon regional rail services	Portbou	—	—	—

== Bibliography ==
- Julià Sort, Jordi (October 2013). Sagrera i la xarxa ferroviària de Barcelona [Sagrera and Barcelona's railway system] (in Catalan). Barcelona: Viena Edicions. ISBN 978-84-8330-740-3.
- Plan de infraestructuras ferroviarias de cercanías de Barcelona 2008-2015 [2008–2015 Infrastructure Master Plan for the Barcelona Commuter Rail Service] (PDF) (Technical report) (in Spanish). Ministry of Public Works and Transport. Government of Spain. February 2009 – via Associació per a la Promoció del Transport Públic.
