= Sant Jordi Desvalls railway station =

Railway station in Catalonia, Spain

Sant Jordi Desvalls
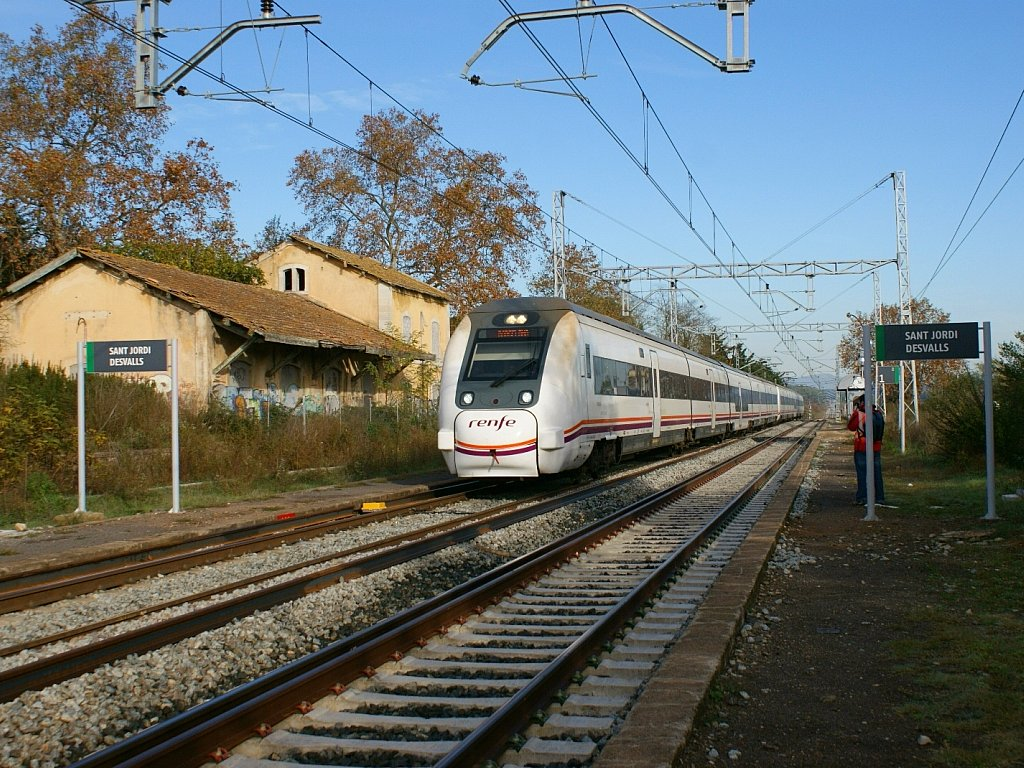
- Sant Jordi Desvalls Railway Station.

General information
- Location: Carrer de l'Estació, Sant Jordi Desvalls; Catalonia; Spain
- Coordinates: 42.06833°N 2.96447°E
- System: Rodalies de Catalunya commuter and regional rail station
- Owner: Adif
- Operator: Renfe Operadora

History
- Opened: 1877
Location

Sant Jordi Desvalls station is a railway station owned by Adif located in the municipality of Sant Jordi Desvalls, in the Gironès county, Catalonia, Spain. The station is on the Barcelona–Girona–Portbou line and is served by trains on the regional R11 line and the RG1 commuter line of Rodalies de Catalunya, operated by Renfe Operadora. The station is listed in the Inventory of the Architectural Heritage of Catalonia and is protected as a Cultural Asset of Local Interest.

In 2016, the station registered 6,000 passenger entries.

== History ==
This station opened on 28 October 1877 when the section built by the Companyia dels Ferrocarrils de Tarragona a Barcelona i França (TBF) between Girona and Figueres came into service.

The station, classified as a Cultural Asset of Local Interest, is in a rather neglected state. In 2004, the Sant Jordi Desvalls town council requested its declassification due to its poor condition and RENFE's refusal to renovate it, but the Heritage Commission did not approve the request, considering the station to be a historical landmark worth preserving and restoring. They agreed to require the owners to fulfil this obligation.

== Building ==
The complex consists of two adjoining buildings: one for passengers and the other for storage. The warehouse building, with a square floor plan, has a ground floor and one upper floor, and is covered with a gable roof. The walls, made of rammed earth and plastered, feature openings with prominent structural elements (arches and jambs). The first-floor windows and the ground-floor doors are topped with flat arches made of brick. The two floors are separated externally by a projecting cornice, like the rest of the structural elements. The passenger building is smaller, with a single floor and an elongated roof slope supported by two columns, forming a porch. The overall conservation state of the complex is poor.

== Railway services ==
Serveis regionals de Rodalies de Catalunya
Origin/Destination	Preceding station	Rodalies de Catalunya	Following station	Origin/Destination
Barcelona- Sants	Flaçà		Camallera	Cerbère
Mataró	Flaçà		Camallera	Portbou

== See also ==
- Rail transport in Catalonia
