= Camallera railway station =

Railway station in Catalonia, Spain

Camallera
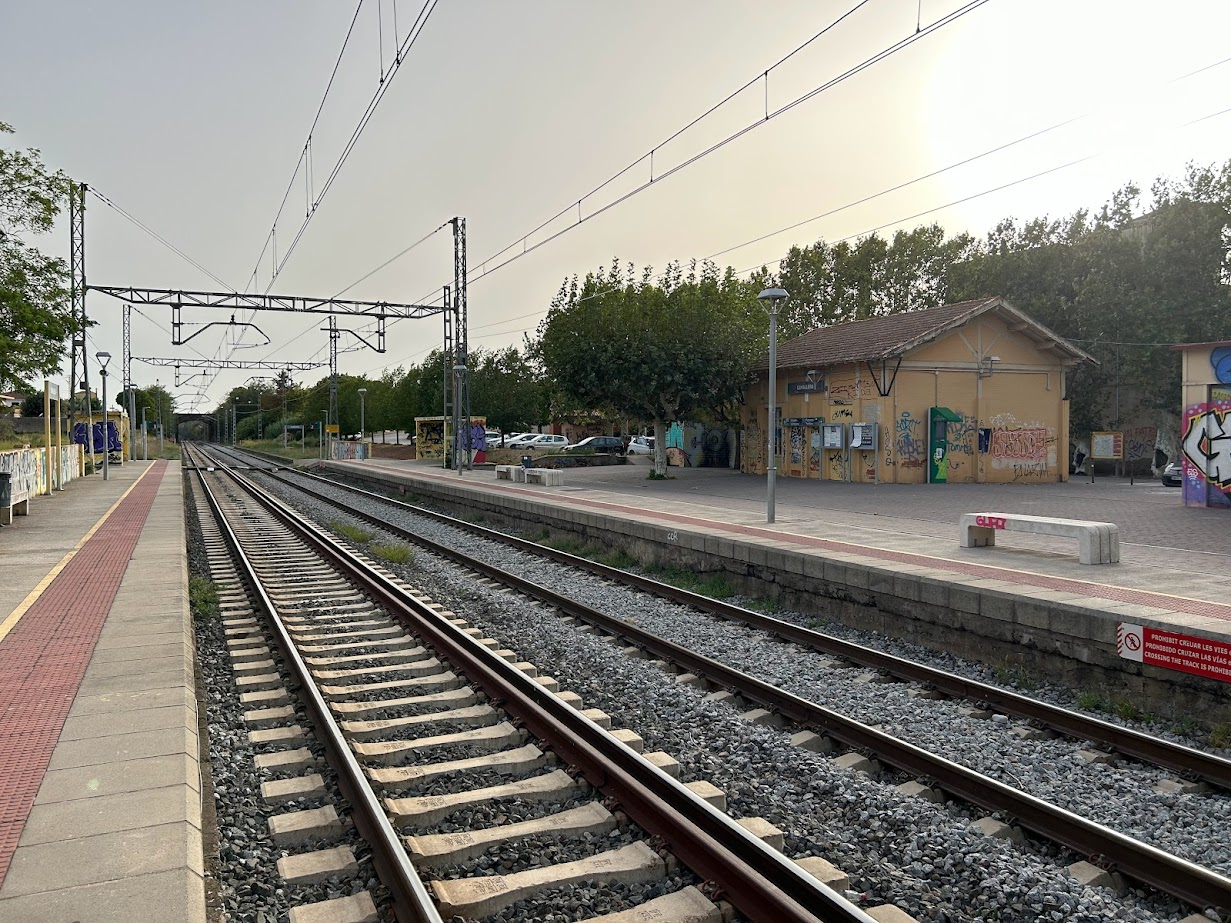
- Camallera Railway Station.

General information
- Location: Carrer de l'Estació, Saus, Camallera i Llampaies, Alt Empordà; Catalonia; Spain
- Coordinates: 42.12233°N 2.96539°E
- System: Rodalies de Catalunya commuter and regional rail station
- Owner: Adif
- Operator: Renfe Operadora

History
- Opened: 1877
Location

Camallera is a railway station owned by Adif, located to the east of the town of Camallera, in the municipality of Saus, Camallera i Llampaies in the Alt Empordà region. The station is on the Barcelona-Girona-Portbou line and is served by trains on the regional R11 line and the RG1 commuter line of Rodalies de Catalunya, operated by Renfe Operadora.

This station on the Girona line opened in 1877 when the section built by the Tarragona to Barcelona and France Railway Company (TBF) between Girona and Figueres entered service.

In 2016, the station recorded 20,000 passengers.

== Railway services ==
Camallera is serverd by:

- R11: regional services between Barcelona Sants and Cerbère.
- RG1: commuter services connecting the Costa Brava and central Girona area

Serveis regionals de Rodalies de Catalunya
Origin/Destination	Preceding station	Rodalies de Catalunya	Following station	Origin/Destination
Barcelona- Sants	Sant Jordi Desvalls		Sant Miquel de Fluvià	Cerbère
Mataró	Sant Jordi Desvalls		Sant Miquel de Fluvià	Portbou

== See also ==
- Rail transport in Catalonia
