= List of Olympic venues in table tennis =

In the Summer Olympics, there are eight venues that have hosted or are planned to host table tennis.

Games	Venue	Other sports hosted at venue for those games	Capacity	Ref.
1988 Seoul	Seoul National University Gymnasium	Badminton (demonstration)	5,000	
1992 Barcelona	Estació del Nord Sports Hall	None	5,500	
1996 Atlanta	Georgia World Congress Center	Fencing	3,900	
1996 Atlanta	Georgia World Congress Center	Handball	7,300	
1996 Atlanta	Georgia World Congress Center	Judo	7,300	
1996 Atlanta	Georgia World Congress Center	Modern pentathlon (fencing, shooting)	—	
1996 Atlanta	Georgia World Congress Center	Weightlifting	5,000	
1996 Atlanta	Georgia World Congress Center	Wrestling	7,300	
1996 Atlanta	Georgia World Congress Center	(Table tennis)	4,700	
2000 Sydney	State Sports Centre	Taekwondo	5,006	
2004 Athens	Galatsi Olympic Hall	Gymnastics (rhythmic)	6,200	
2008 Beijing	Peking University Gymnasium	None	8,000	
2012 London	ExCeL	Boxing, fencing, judo, taekwondo, weightlifting, wrestling	Not listed	
2016 Rio de Janeiro	Riocentro	Badminton, Boxing	7,000	
2020 Tokyo	Tokyo Metropolitan Gymnasium	None	10,000	
2024 Paris	Paris Expo Porte de Versailles	Handball (preliminaries), volleyball, weightlifting	6,000	
2028 Los Angeles	Los Angeles Convention Center	Basketball (women's preliminaries), fencing, taekwondo	5,000	
2032 Brisbane	Brisbane Convention & Exhibition Centre	Badminton, fencing, taekwondo	6,000	

== Gallery of venues ==
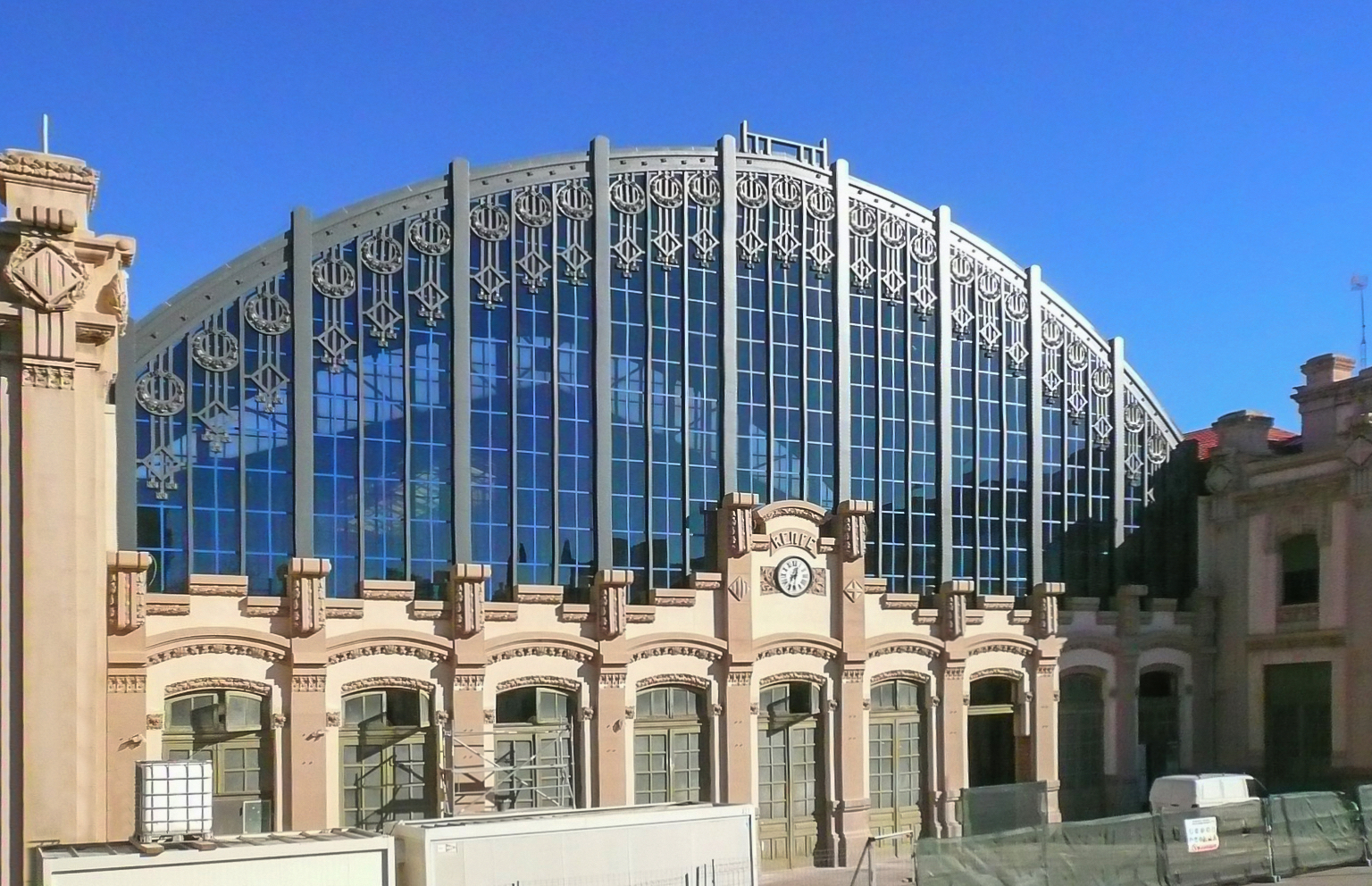
Estació del Nord hosted table tennis at the 1992 Summer Olympics in Barcelona.

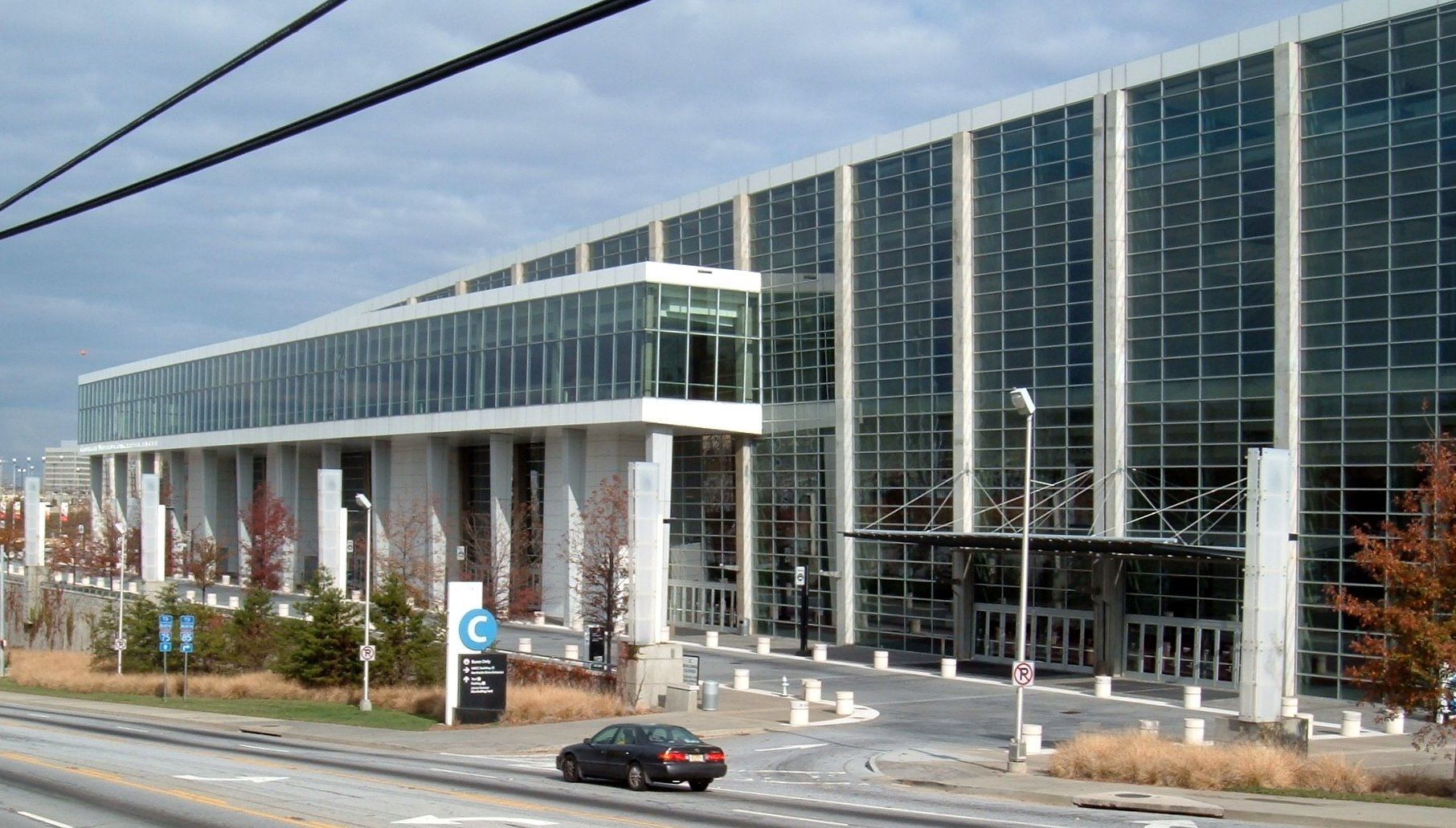
The Georgia World Congress Center hosted table tennis at the 1996 Summer Olympics in Atlanta.

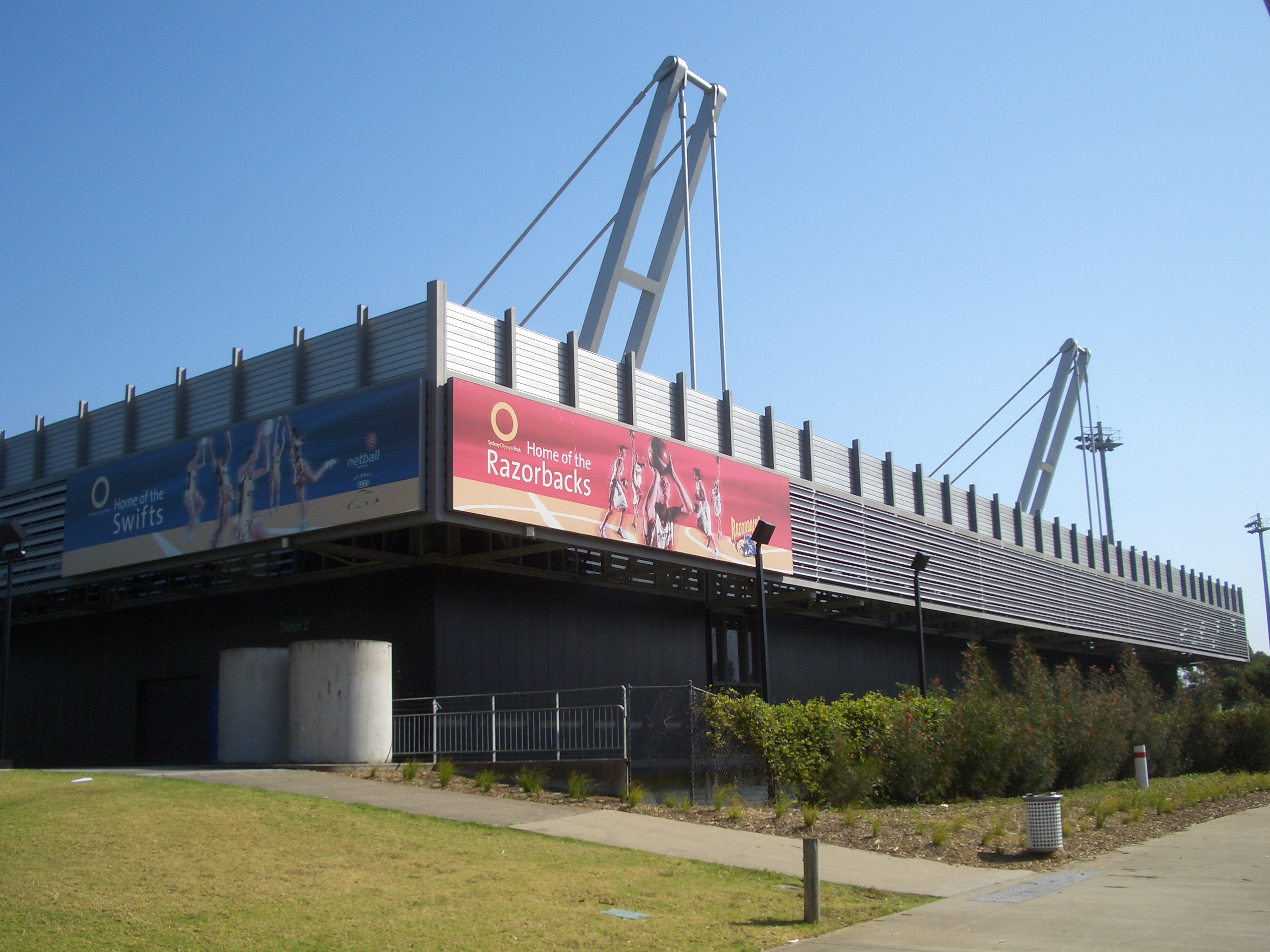
State Sports Centre hosted table tennis at the 2000 Summer Olympics in Sydney.

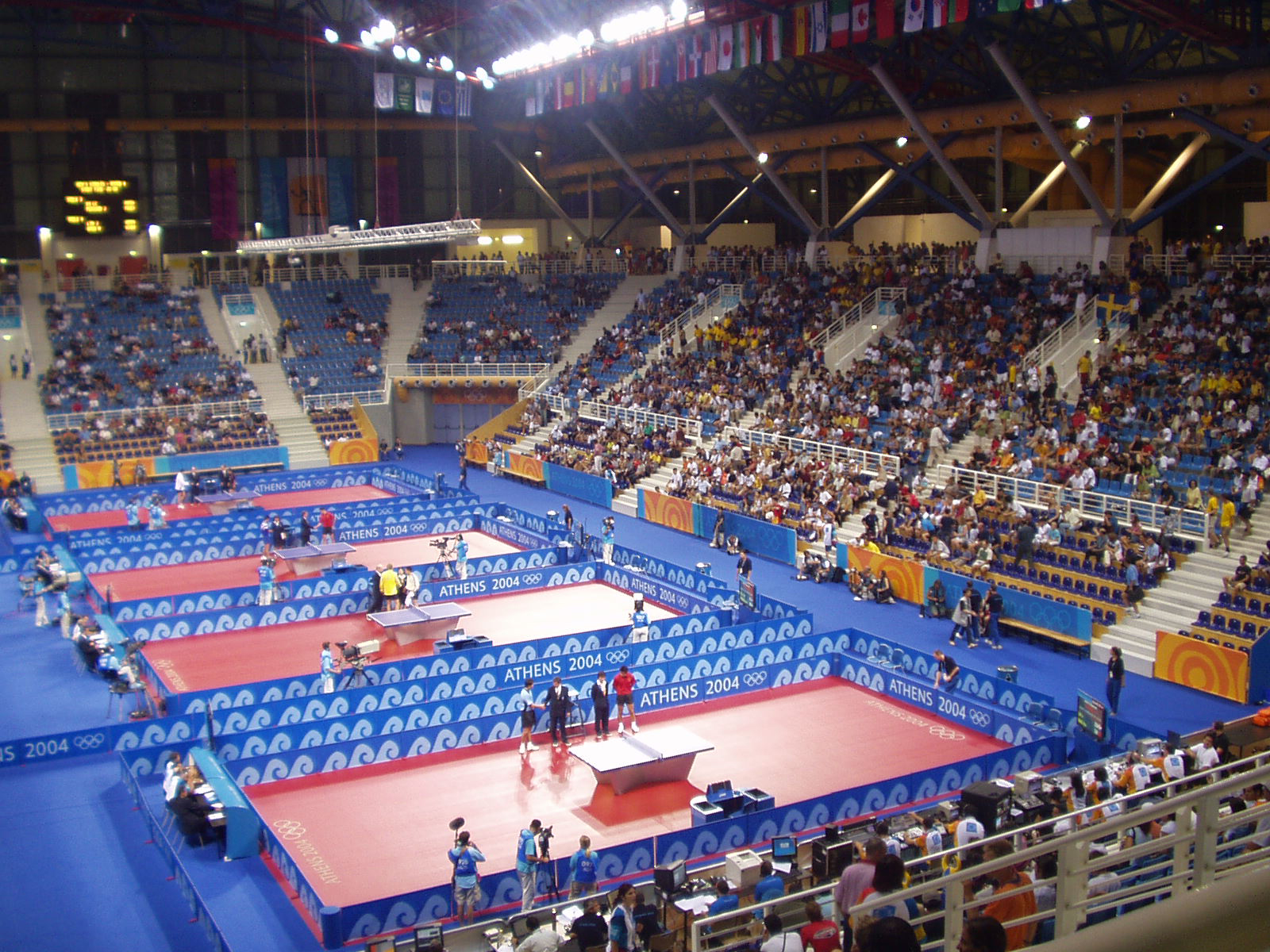
Galatsi Olympic Hall hosted table tennis at the 2004 Summer Olympics in Athens.

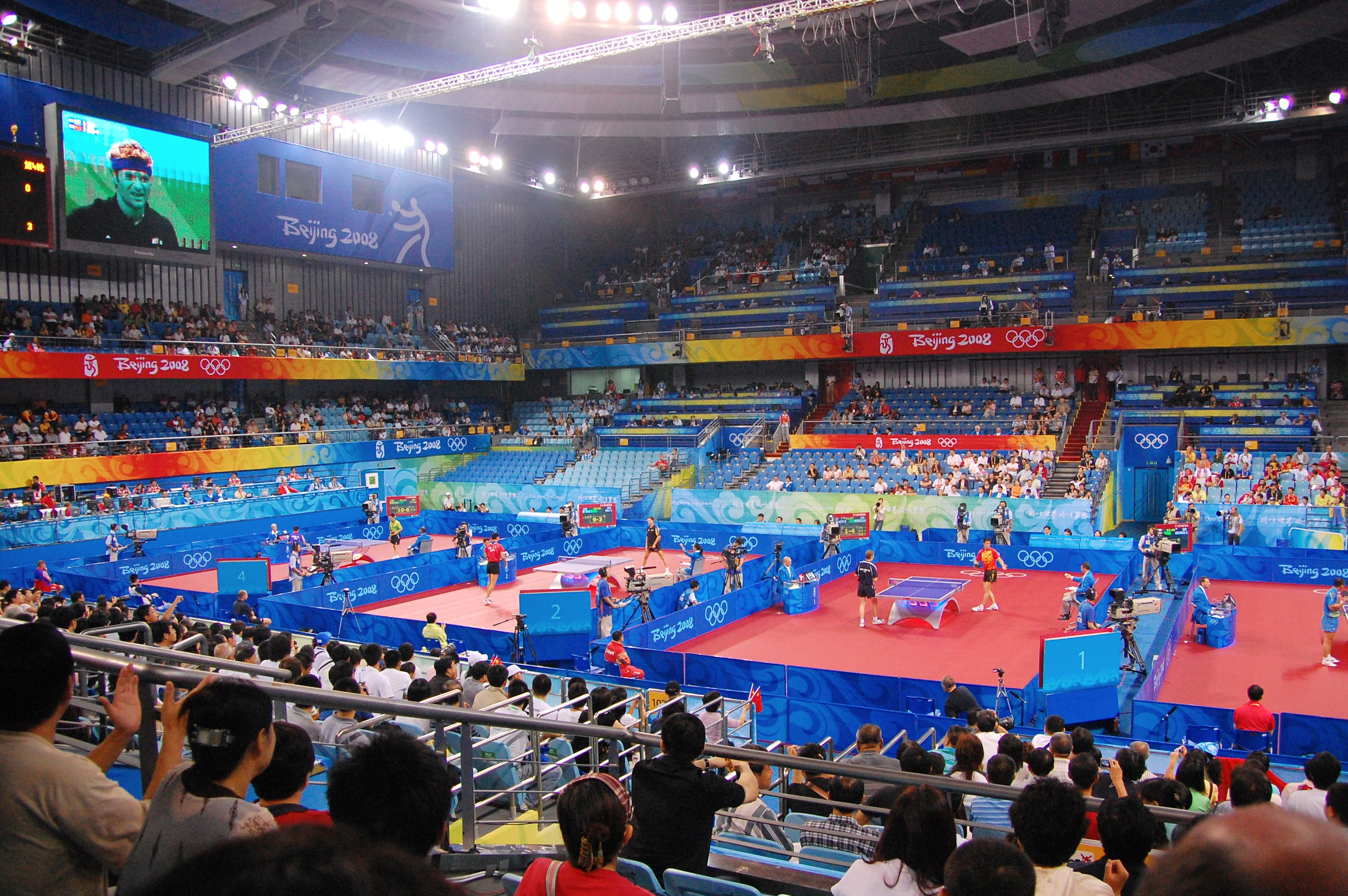
Peking University Gymnasium hosted table tennis at the 2008 Summer Olympics in Beijing.

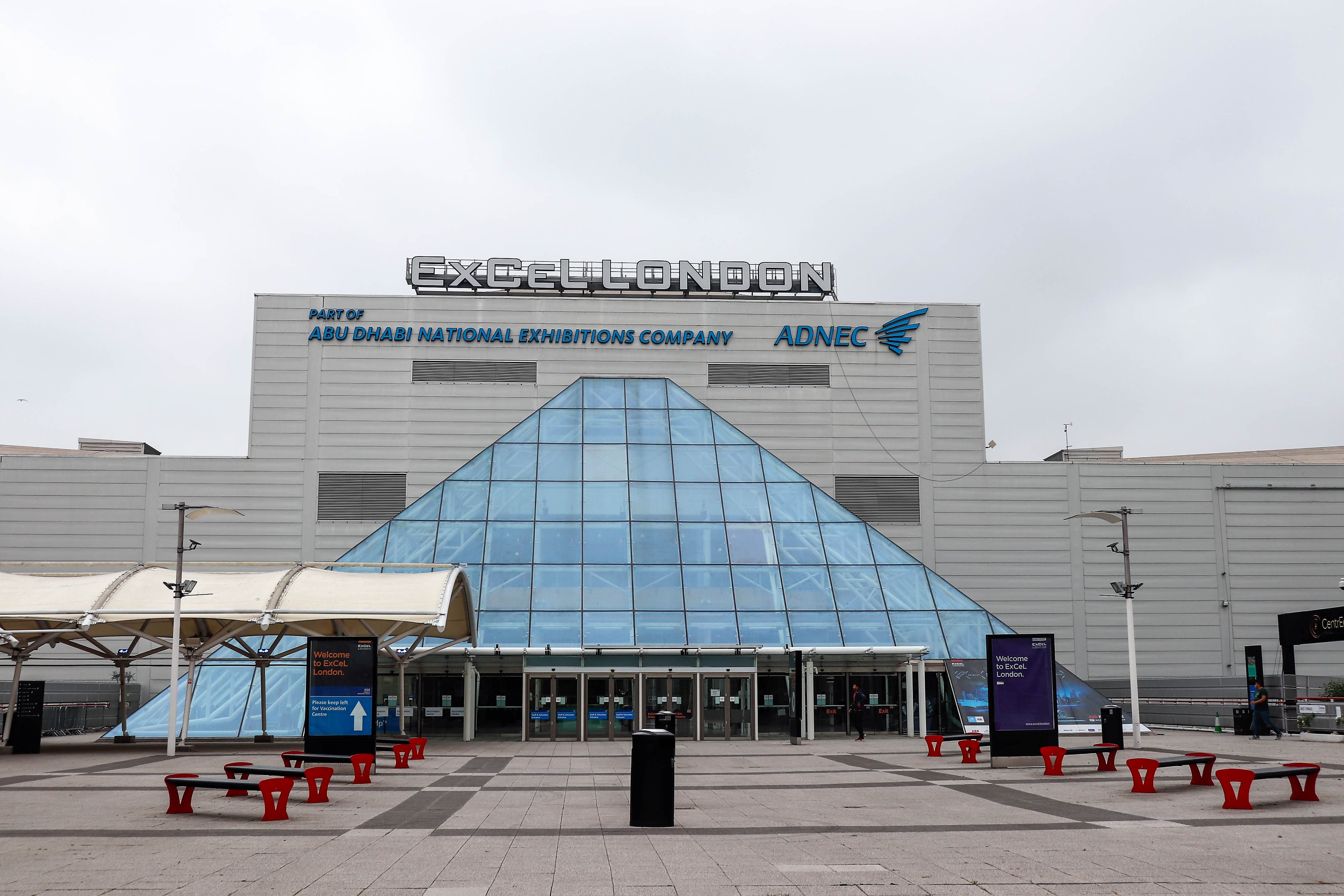
Excel London hosted table tennis at the 2012 Summer Olympics.

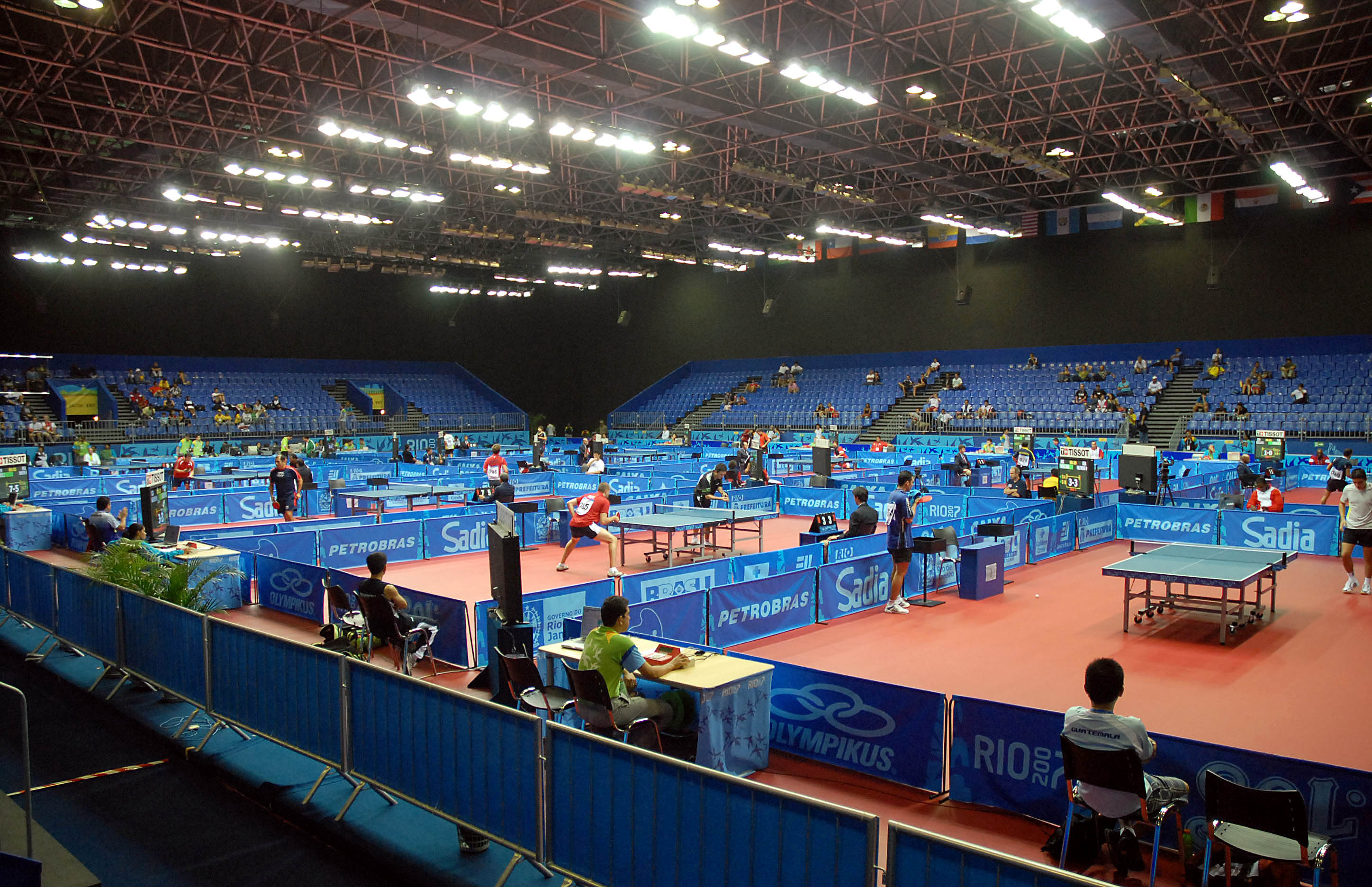
Riocentro hosted table tennis at the 2016 Summer Olympics in Rio de Janeiro.

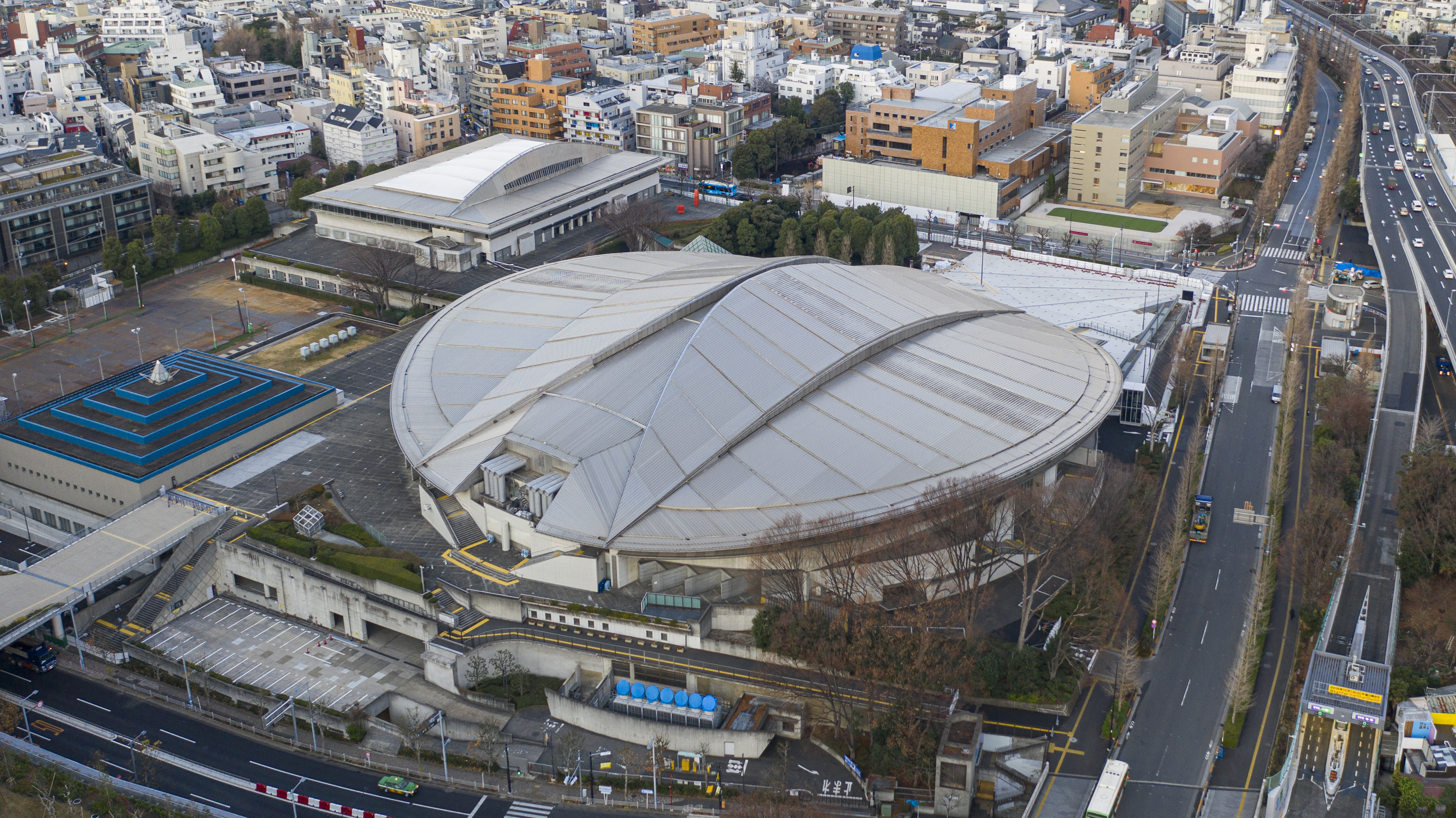
Tokyo Metropolitan Gymnasium hosted table tennis at the 2020 Summer Olympics.

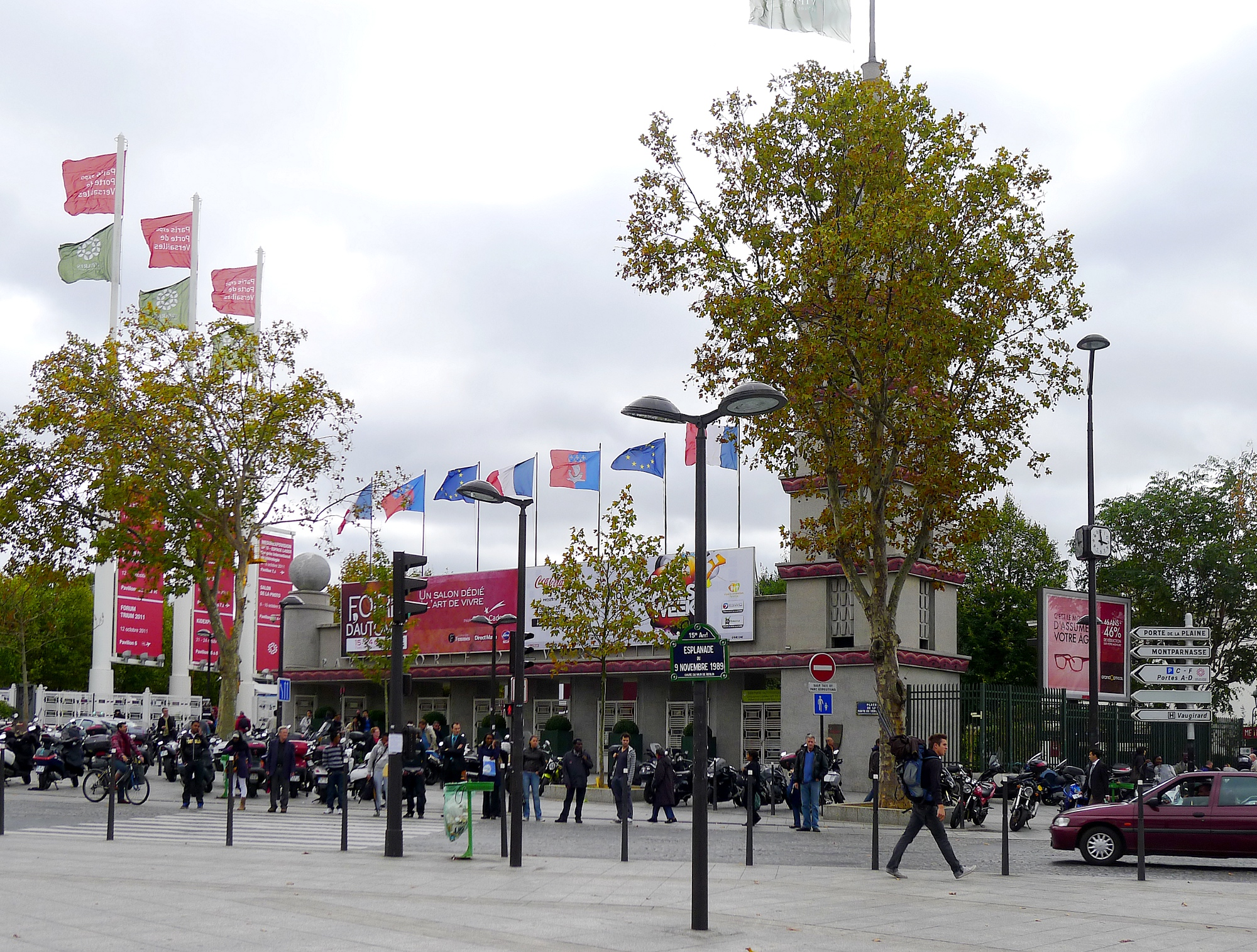
Paris Expo Porte de Versailles hosted table tennis at the 2024 Summer Olympics.

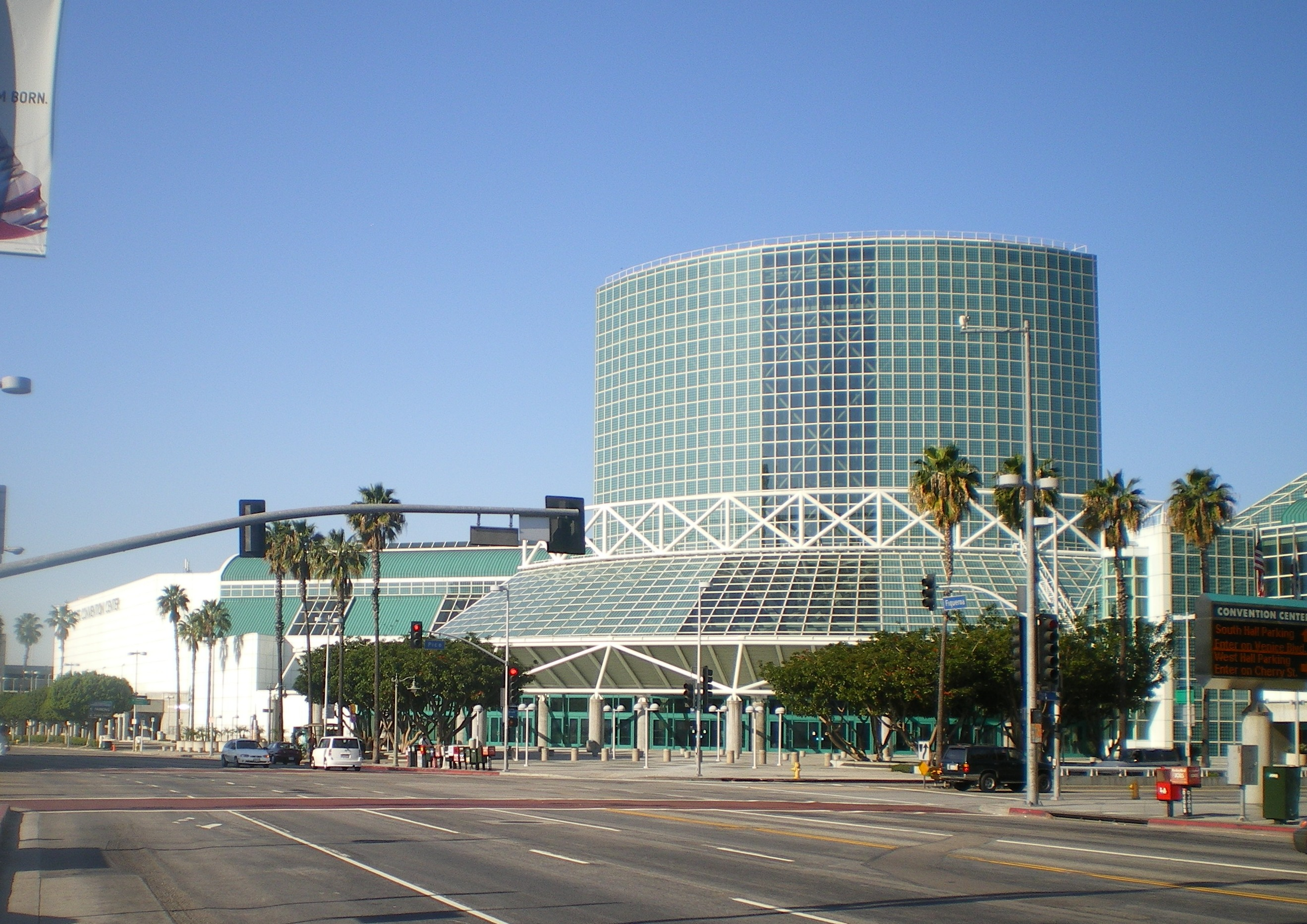
The Los Angeles Convention Center will host table tennis at the 2028 Summer Olympics.
