= Arc de Triomf station =

Railway and metro station in Barcelona, Spain

Arc de Triomf
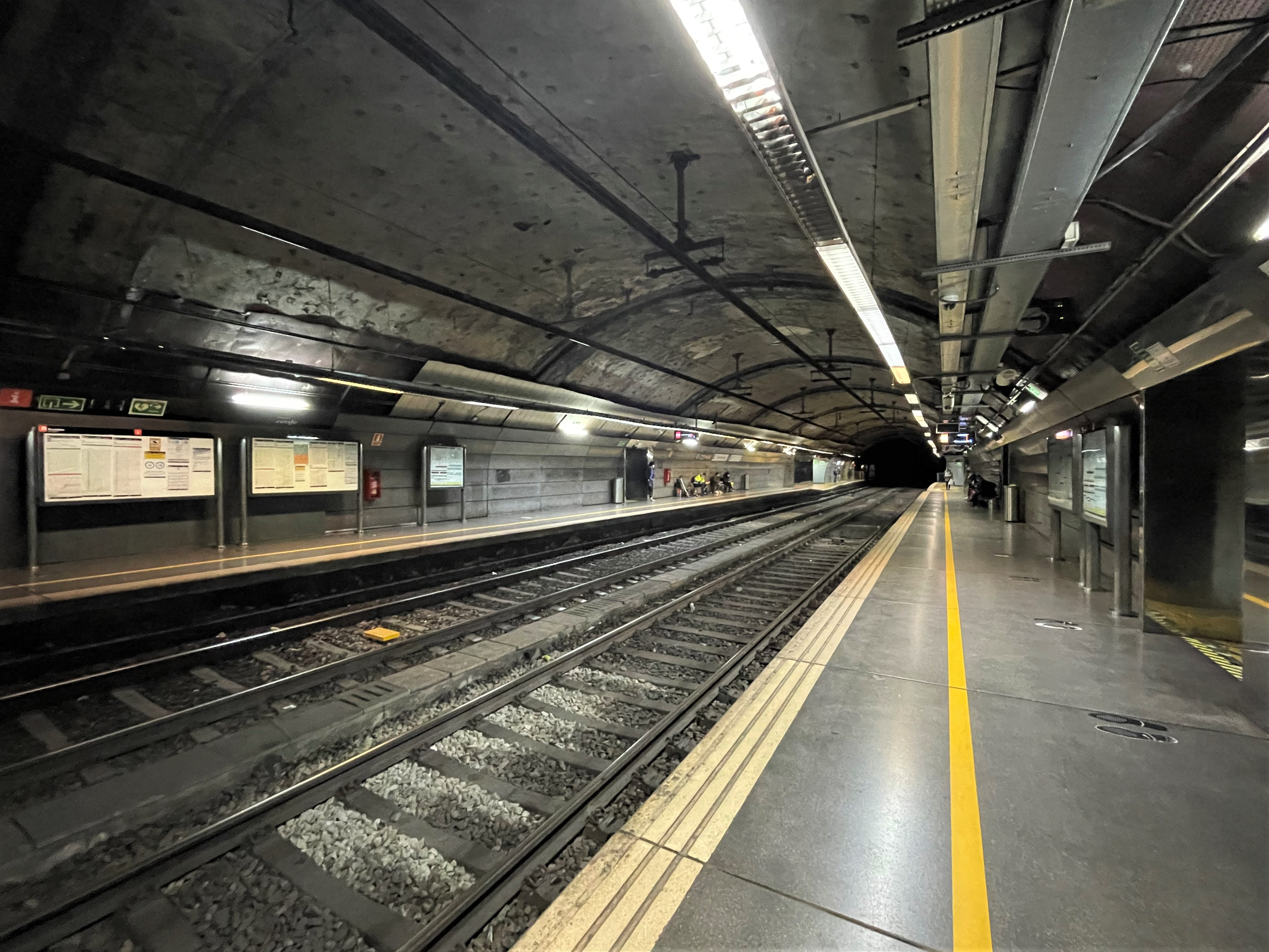
- Rodalies de Catalunya station in 2022

General information
- Coordinates: 41°23′30.33″N 2°10′48.69″E
- System: Rodalies de Catalunya and Barcelona Metro interchange complex
- Owner: Adif (Rodalies station); TMB (Barcelona Metro station)
- Operator: Renfe Operadora (Rodalies station); TMB (Barcelona Metro station)
- Lines: Lleida–Manresa–Barcelona (PK 182.8); Barcelona Metro line 1
- Platforms: 2 side platforms for each station
- Tracks: 2 for each station
- Connections: Local buses; Estació del Nord (bus station)

Construction
- Structure type: Underground
- Cycle facilities: Bicing station located nearby
- Accessible: yes

Other information
- Station code: 78804 (Rodalies station); 128 (Barcelona Metro station)
- Fare zone: 1 (ATM Àrea de Barcelona and Rodalies de Catalunya's Barcelona commuter rail service)

History
- Opened: 1932 (Barcelona Metro station); 1933 (Rodalies station)

Services
Preceding station	Rodalies de Catalunya	Following station
Barcelona Plaça de Catalunya towards Molins de Rei	R1	Barcelona El Clot-Aragó towards Maçanet-Massanes
Barcelona Plaça de Catalunya towards L'Hospitalet de Llobregat	R3	Barcelona La Sagrera-Meridiana towards Latour-de-Carol-Enveitg
Barcelona Plaça de Catalunya towards Sant Vicenç de Calders	R4	Barcelona La Sagrera-Meridiana towards Manresa
Barcelona Plaça de Catalunya towards L'Hospitalet de Llobregat	RG1	Barcelona El Clot-Aragó towards Portbou
Barcelona Plaça de Catalunya towards L'Hospitalet de Llobregat	R12	Barcelona La Sagrera-Meridiana towards Lleida Pirineus
Preceding station	Metro	Following station
Urquinaona towards Hospital de Bellvitge	L1	Marina towards Fondo
Location
- Location within Barcelona

Arc de Triomf (Catalan pronunciation: [ˈarg də tɾiˈomf]) is a Rodalies de Catalunya and Barcelona Metro interchange complex. It is named after the adjacent triumphal arch near which it is situated, in the Barcelona district of Eixample in Catalonia, Spain. The Rodalies station is served by Barcelona commuter rail service lines R1, R3 and R4, as well as Girona commuter rail service line RG1 and regional line R12. The Barcelona Metro station is served by TMB-operated line L1.

The complex is located near Estació del Nord, Barcelona's main bus station.

== Station layout ==
Rodalies de Catalunya railway station is located under Avinguda Vilanova between Passeig de San Joan and Nàpols street. It was opened in 1933 as a prolongation to the city center on Puigcerdà and Manresa lines which had its terminus station in Estació del Nord, situated near the current railway station. It has two groups of accesses, one in Passeig de Sant Joan and the other one in Nàpols street. The accesses to the platforms are equipped with fixed stairs and both go to the same hall, where there are ticket vending machines. The station is being remodeled to make it more accessible for disabled persons.

== Accesses ==
- Avinguda Vilanova
- Carretera de Ribes
- Carrer Nàpols
- Passeig de Sant Joan
