= Palamós–Girona–Banyoles railway =

Former narrow gauge railway line in Catalonia, Spain

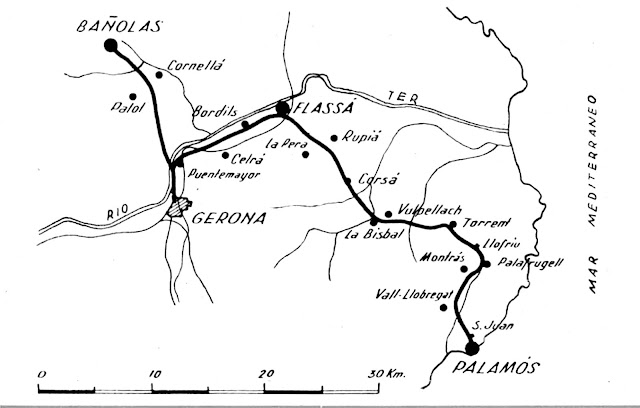
- Map of the line at full extent

Overview
- Status: Dismantled
- Locale: Province of Girona, Catalonia, Spain

History
- Opened: 1887
- Closed: 1956

Technical
- Line length: 63 kilometres (39 mi)
- Number of tracks: 1
- Track gauge: 750 mm (2 ft 5 1/2 in)

The Palamós to Flaçà, Girona and Banyoles Railway was a 750 mm (2 ft 5 1/2 in) gauge railway line that operated over 63 kilometres (39 mi) of track between Palamós, Girona and Banyoles, in the province of Girona, Catalonia, Spain. The line was promoted by the Tranvía del Bajo Ampurdán company.

The first section of the line, a stretch of 33 km (21 mi) from Palamós to Flaçà via Palafrugell and La Bisbal d'Empordà, opened in 1887. From its opening, the railway had a connection with the Iberian (1,668 mm or 5 ft 5 21/32 in) gauge Barcelona–Cerbère railway at Flaçà, and provided the only rail connection to the port at Palamós and the inland towns of Palafrugell and La Bisbal. The trains transported passengers and freight, especially cork, which was exported from nearby plantations to destinations in France and beyond.

In 1905, the line was purchased by the Belgian owned Ferrocarriles Económicos de Cataluña company. In 1921, the line was extended by 16 km (9.9 mi) from Flaçà to Girona, running roughly parallel to the Iberian gauge main line. The Girona terminus, at Porta de França, was some distance from the city's main line station and the termini of the city's two other narrow gauge railways, the Sant Feliu de Guíxols–Girona railway and the Olot–Girona railway.

In 1923, the railway line changed hands again, being acquired by the Ferrocarriles Económicos Españoles. In 1928, a 14 km (8.7 mi) branch was opened to Banyoles, diverging from the main line at Pont Major in the north of Girona.

The line was badly damaged during the Spanish Civil War, and in 1941 it was taken over by the state owned organisation Explotación de Ferrocarriles por el Estado. The line was reopened in 1942, after the war time damage had been repaired, but it closed for good in 1956.

Part of the line between Palamós and Palafrugell has been converted into a greenway. The Baixador de Mata, a wayside station building between Pont Major and Banyoles, still exists and is included in the Inventory of the Architectural Heritage of Catalonia. Outside the building a platform and short stretch of roadside track has been reconstructed, and a replica of one of the line's passenger cars is displayed.

== Gallery ==
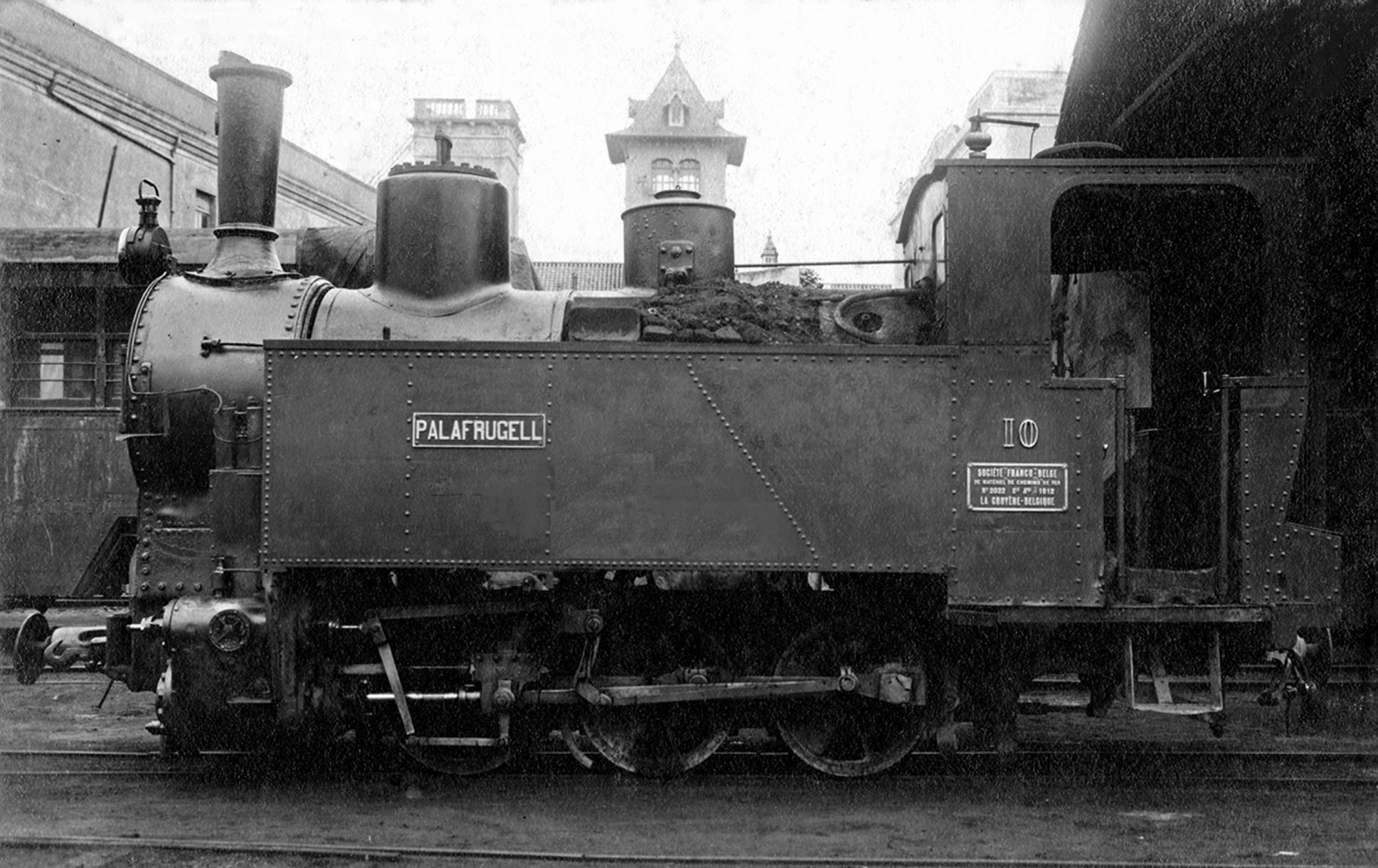
One of the line's locomotives in 1953

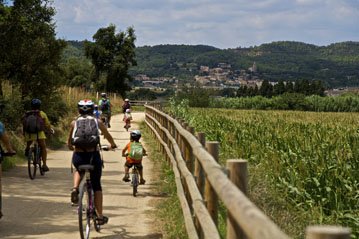
Greenway of the route of the line

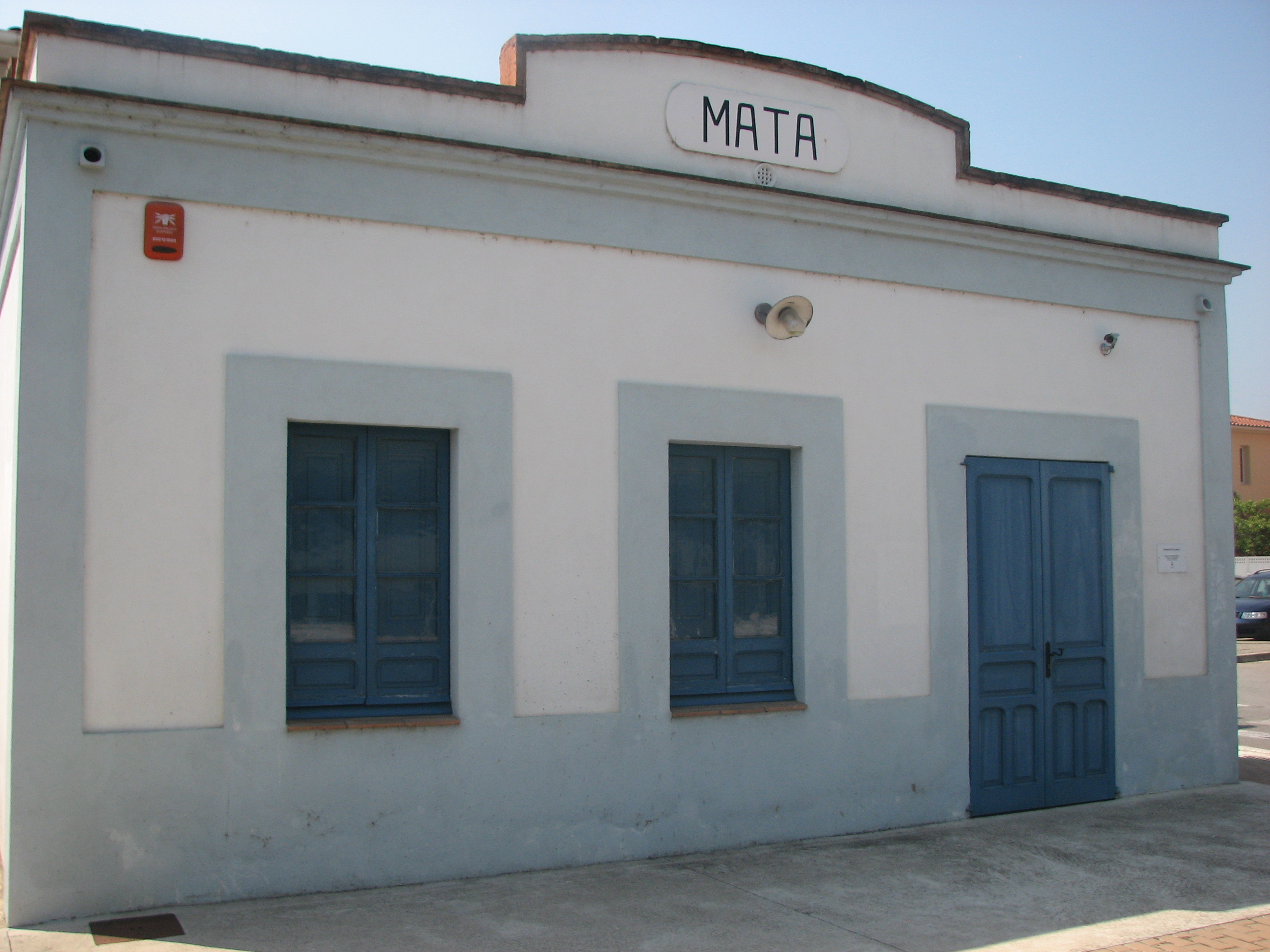
Baixador de Mata

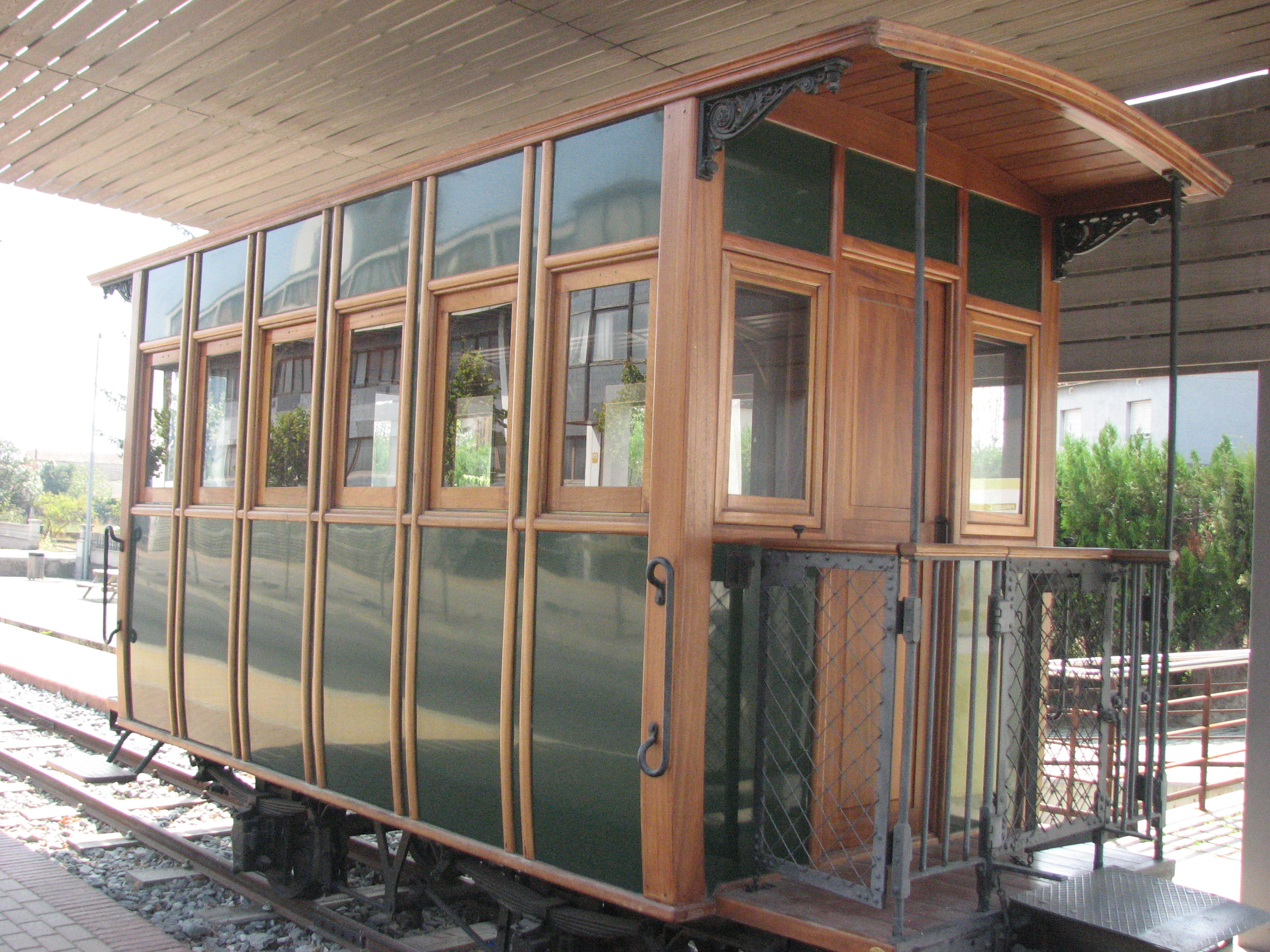
Replica of passenger car
