= Estació del Nord (Barcelona) =

Bus station and sports hall in Spain

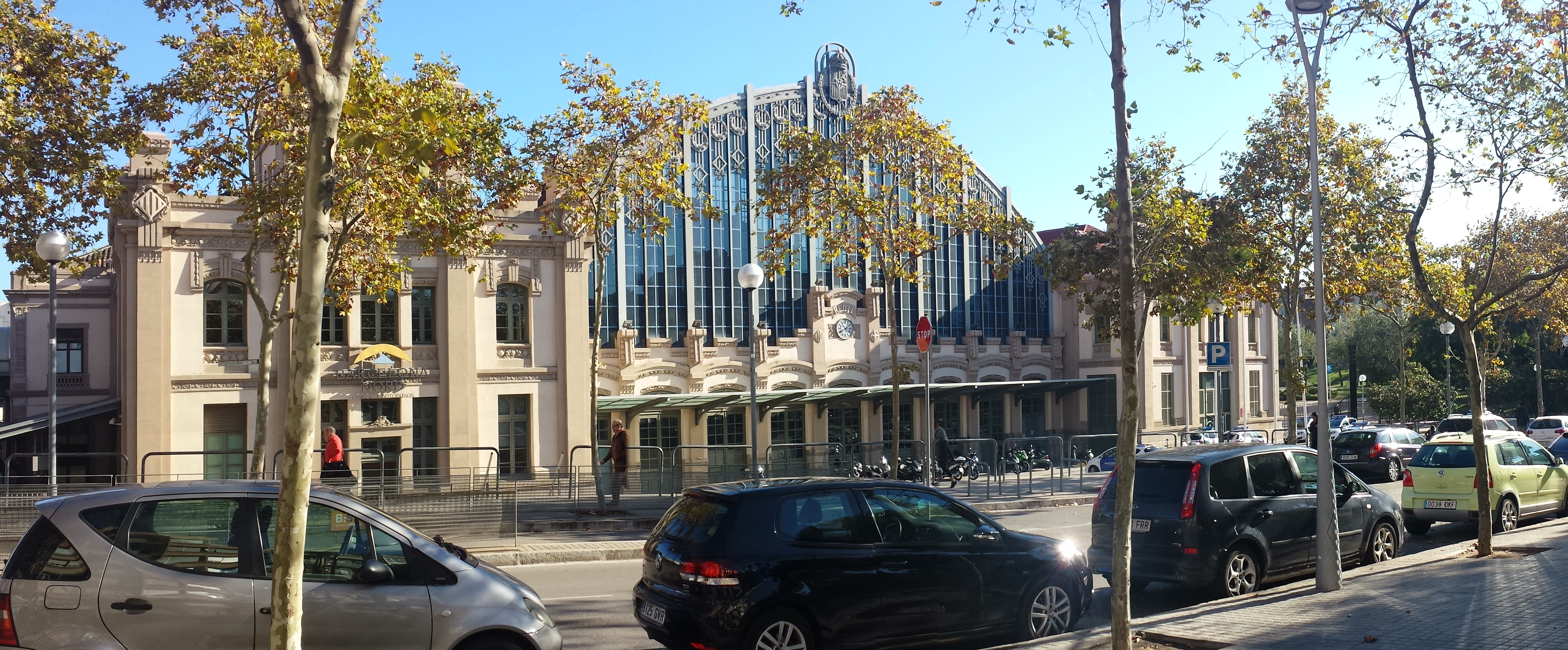
- The frontage seen from Plaça d'André Malraux

General information
- Location: Barcelona, Catalonia; Spain
- Coordinates: 41°23′38.36″N 2°10′58.09″E

History
- Opened: 1862
- Rebuilt: 1910-1915 (new train shed and facade); 1972 (as bus station and sports hall)
Location
- Location within Barcelona Location within Spain

The Estació del Nord or Estación del Norte, is a former main line railway station in the city of Barcelona, Catalonia, Spain. Originally opened in 1862, it was closed as a railway station in 1972. It is now used partly as a bus station, partly as a large multi-purpose sports hall, and partly as a police station. The sports hall is known as the Poliesportiu Estació del Nord, and was a 1992 Summer Olympics venue. The bus station is known as the Estació d'Autobusos Barcelona Nord, and is Barcelona's principal terminal for scheduled medium and long-distance coach services.

The station lies in the Fort Pienc neighbourhood of the Eixample district of Barcelona, some 1.3 kilometres (0.81 mi) from Plaça de Catalunya. The Arc de Triomf station, served by Barcelona Metro line L1 and Rodalies de Catalunya suburban trains, has an entrance directly in front of the station on Plaça d'André Malraux. The Parc de l'Estació del Nord, laid out on the site of sidings associated with the station, lies to the south-east.

== History ==
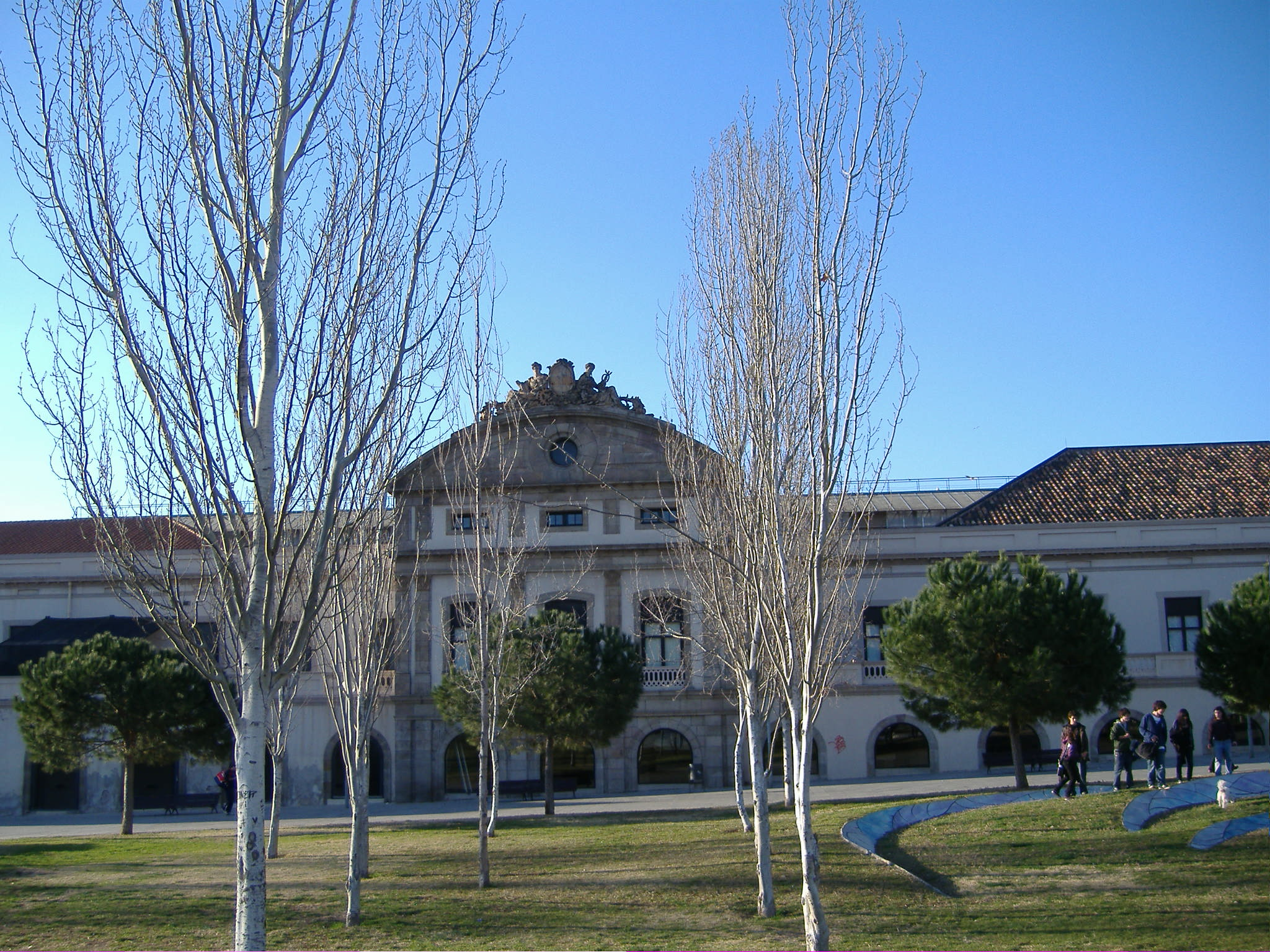
The original 1861 facade facing the park

The original railway station on the site was built in phases, from 1861, on land that had previously been occupied by Fort Pienc, a fortress raised by Philip V following the fall of Barcelona during the War of the Spanish Succession. The original façade, by P. Andrés i Puigdoller in a neoclassical style, still exists on the south-eastern side of the station facing the park. The station opened on 21 May 1862, as the terminus of the Compañía del Ferrocarril de Zaragoza a Barcelona line from Zaragoza.

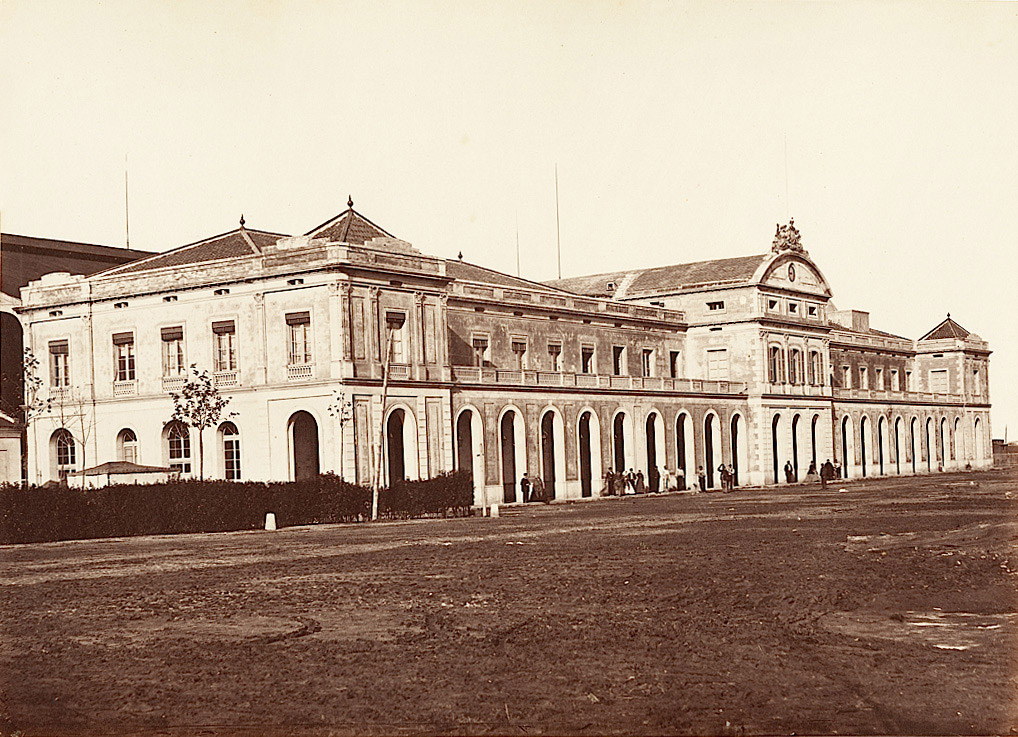
North Station, Barcelona by Juan Laurent, c. 1864–1867, Department of Image Collections, National Gallery of Art Library, Washington, DC

In 1878, the railway from Zaragoza was absorbed into the Compañía de los Caminos de Hierro del Norte de España, at which point the station adopted its current name. Between 1910 and 1915, the station was extended, with the construction of large train shed. Across the end of this train shed and facing the Plaça d'André Malraux, a new facade was constructed to a design by Demetri Ribes, comprising an enclosed glass arch flanked by wings with elements of Catalan Modernism and Vienna Secession styles.

In 1972, the railway station was closed, with the railway approach to the station placed underground and diverted to serve Arc de Triomf station, whilst longer distance trains were diverted to Estació de França. After this, the Estació del Nord was left empty. In 1983, the city bought the station with the intention of converting it into a bus station for long-distance buses and a transport museum. These plans did not come to fruition and the station was left abandoned. However, in 1987 it was announced that the 1992 Summer Olympics would include table tennis, and Estació del Nord was selected as the venue for that competition.

The architects Enric Tous and Josep Maria Fargas were selected to refurbish the station, respecting much of the original structure of the old station, whilst marquees outside the station provided ancillary facilities such as rest areas and offices. Besides the new sports arena, the remodelling included the construction of a police station for the city police, a new bus station and a new park, the Parc de l'Estació del Nord. The sports facilities were first used for an Olympic test event in 1991, whilst the bus station was commissioned after the completion of the games.

In 2008, works were undertaken at Arc de Triomf station to improve access exchange with the bus station, including the provision of a new entrance facing the Estació del Nord.

== Sports hall ==
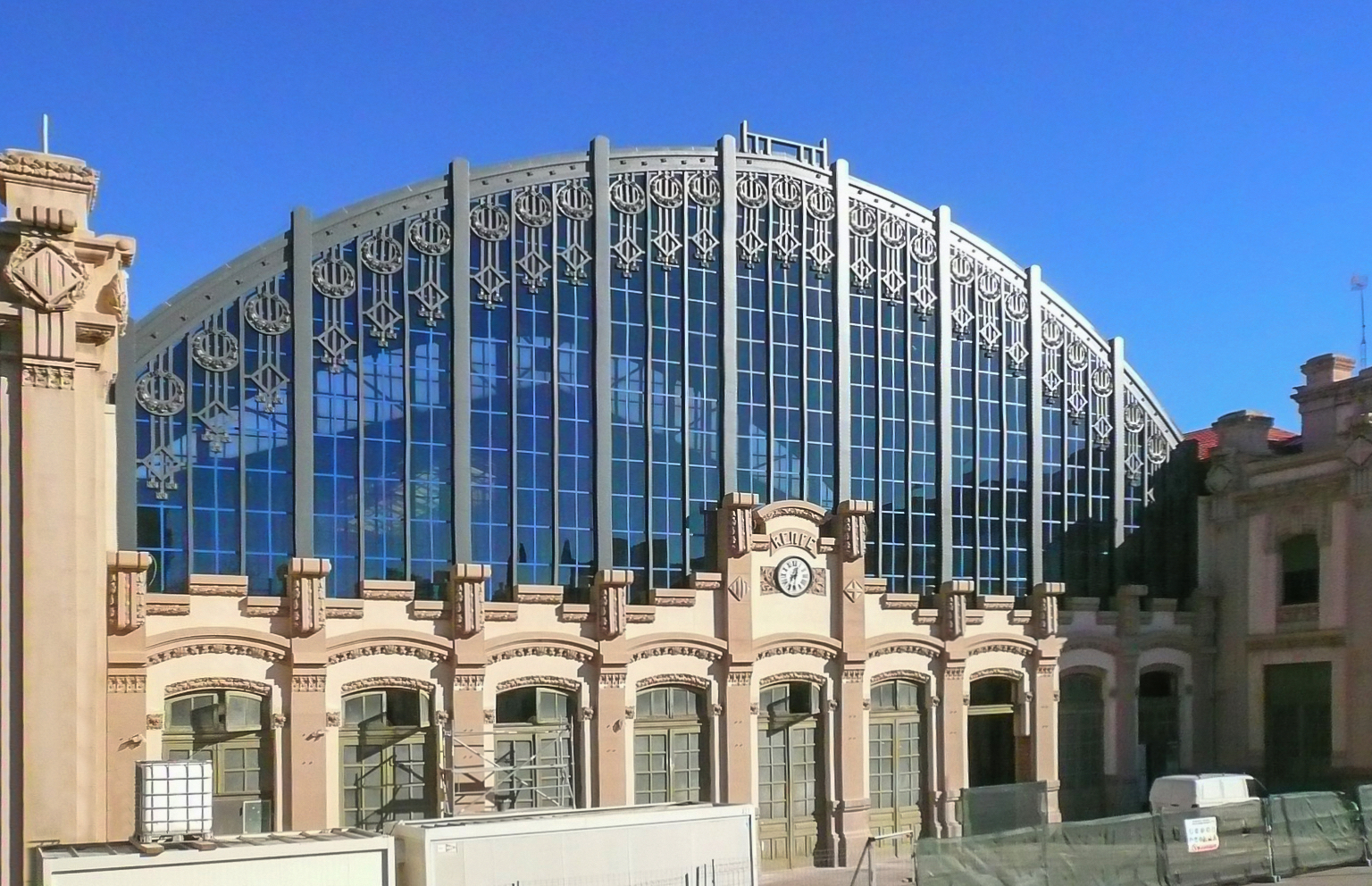
The facade, with sports hall behind

The sports hall occupies the former platform area of the former station, along with part of the east wing of the station. It is managed by the Unió de Federacions Esportives de Catalunya.

== Bus station ==
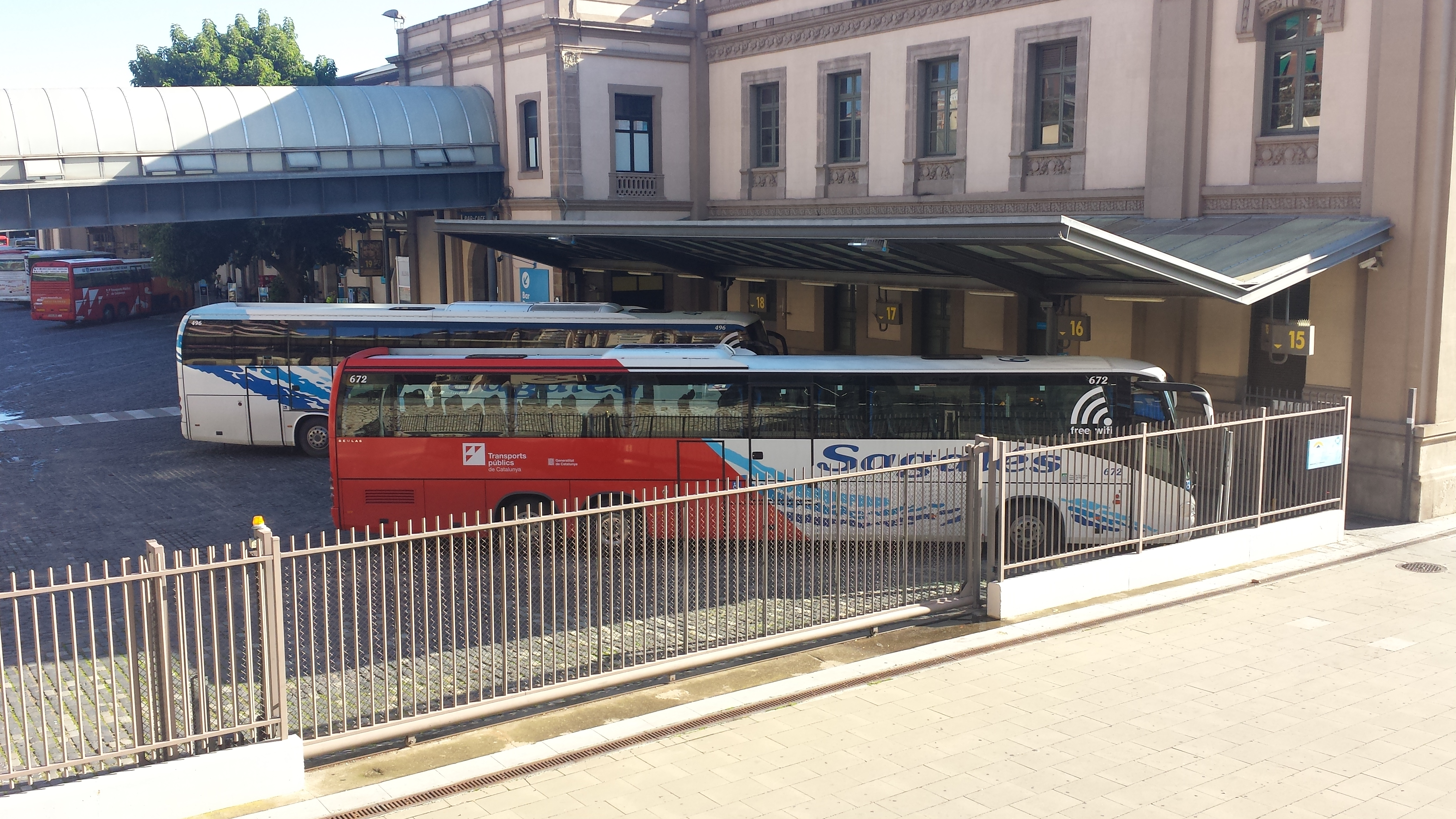
The bus station

The bus station is Barcelona's principal terminal for scheduled medium and long-distance coach services. It serves as either terminus or calling point for services to and from the rest of Catalonia, the whole of Spain and many international destinations.

The bus station occupies the whole of the west wing of the former station, with the building housing ticket offices, waiting areas, a range of shops and restaurants, and other ancillary facilities. The coaches stop in an open area to the north-west of this building, which is surrounded by 47 angled bus stops. Two pedestrian bridges, and pedestrian crossings, link the station building to those stops that are not alongside the main building.

The bus station has access to the Barcelona Metro and Rodalies de Catalunya suburban trains via the adjacent Arc de Triomf station and to local bus services via stops on the adjoining streets. An underground car park is available next to the bus station, with direct pedestrian links to the bus station.
