= Flaçà =

- Municipality
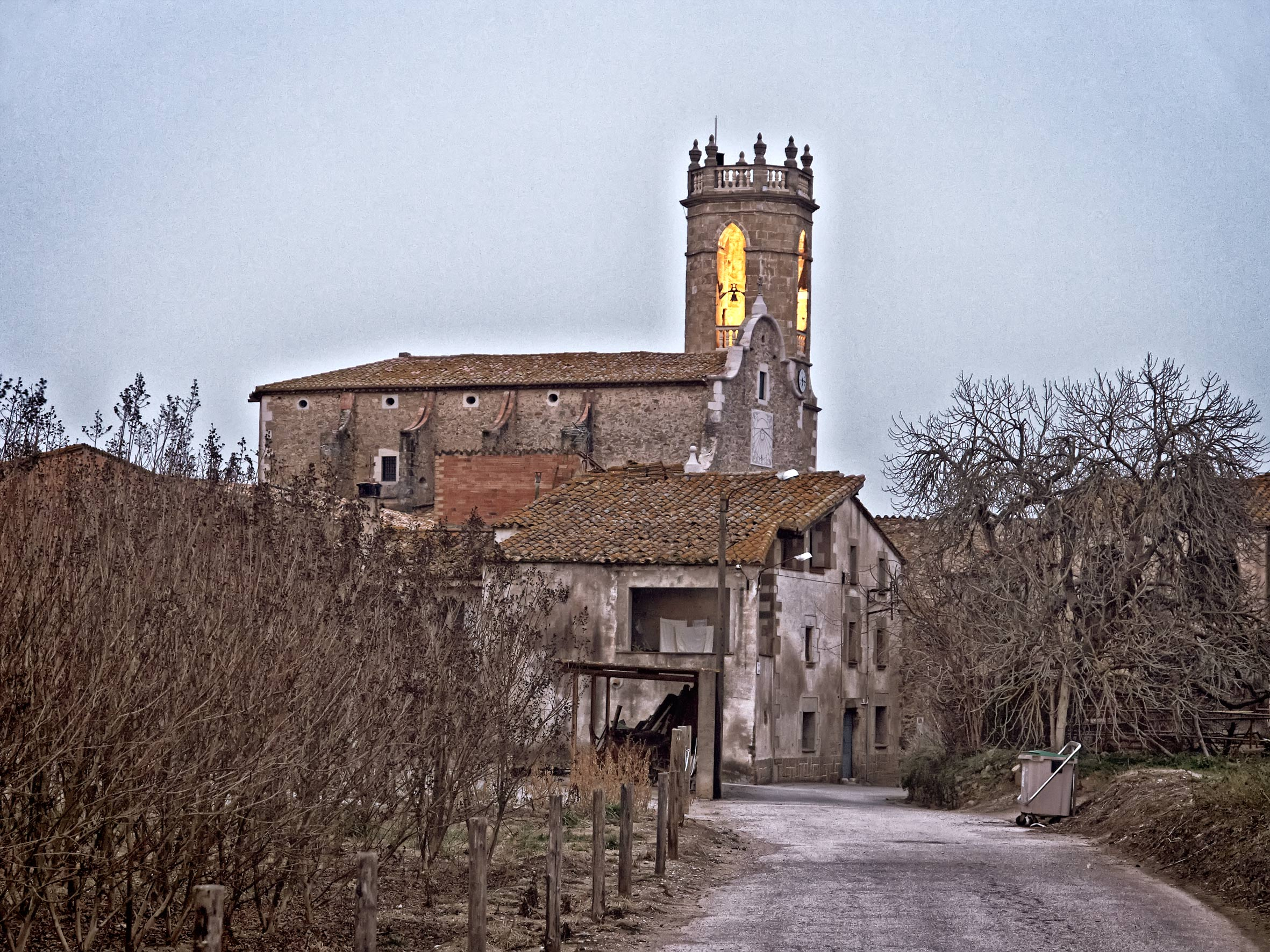
- Flaçà old town with St. Cebrià church

- Flag Coat of arms

- Location in Catalonia Flaçà (Spain)
- Coordinates: 42°3′2″N 2°57′20″E
- Country: Spain
- Community: Catalonia
- Province: Girona
- Comarca: Gironès

Government
  - Mayor: Jesús Font Galí (2015)

Area
  - Total: 6.5 km^{2} (2.5 sq mi)

Population (2025-01-01)
  - Total: 1,175
  - Density: 180/km^{2} (470/sq mi)
- Website: www.flaca.cat

Flaçà (Catalan pronunciation: [fləˈsa]) is a town in the Gironès county of Girona Province, Catalonia, Spain. It occupies an area of 6.67 square kilometers and extends the hills of the Lloreda Valley and alluvial plain of the Ter river. It borders the Ter River to the north and the municipality of Sant Jordi Desvalls to the west with the municipalities of Sant Joan de Mollet Sant Marti Vell to the south and to east, the towns of Foixà and la Pera. The current population is 1,070 people.

Flaçà is served by Flaçà railway station, on the Barcelona–Cerbère railway. It was formerly also on the 750 mm (2 ft 5 1/2 in) gauge Palamós–Girona–Banyoles railway, which opened to Palamós by 1887 and was extended to Girona by 1921. Service on the line continued until 1956.
