= Figueres railway station =

Building in Girona Province, Spain

Coordinates: 42°15′54″N 2°58′08″E

Figueres
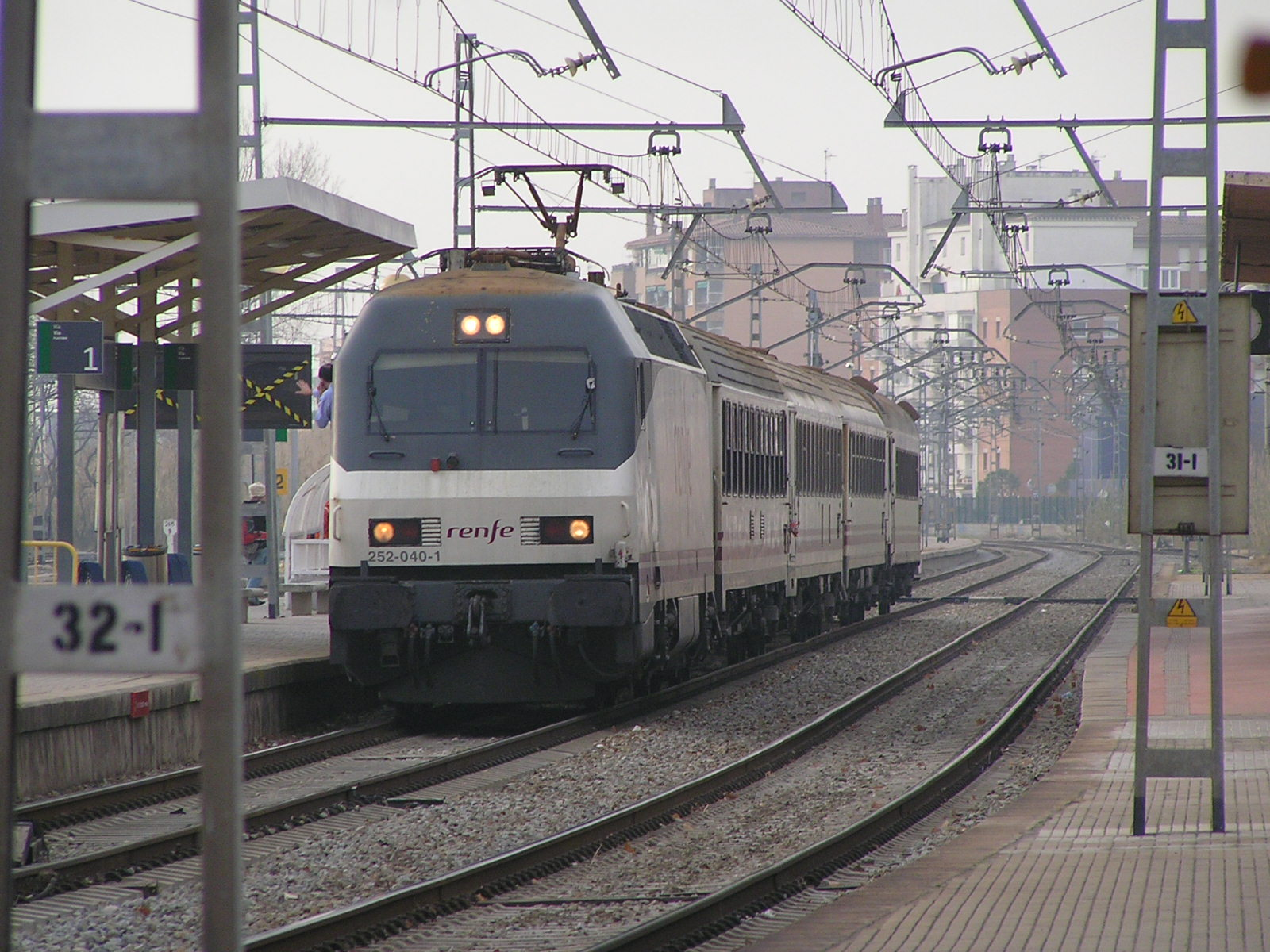
- Renfe Operadora's Estrella "Costa Brava" train hauled by a locomotive 252.040 at the station in 2011.

General information
- Location: Avinguda Puig Grau; 17740 Figueres; Spain
- Owner: Adif
- Operator: Renfe Operadora
- Line: Barcelona–Cerbère (PK 71.1)
- Platforms: 3 island platforms
- Tracks: 9
- Connections: Local and interurban buses

Construction
- Structure type: At-grade
- Accessible: Yes

History
- Opened: 1877

Passengers
- 2018: 920,859
Location
- Location within Catalonia Location within Spain

Figueres is a railway station serving the city of Figueres in Catalonia, Spain. It is on the Barcelona–Cerbère railway and is owned by Adif. The station is served by Rodalies de Catalunya regional line R11 and Girona commuter rail service line RG1.

The station has nine tracks and three platforms. Movement between platforms is via level crossings and an underground passage which consists of stairs that are not wheelchair accessible. The two main platforms have canopies that partly cover the passenger waiting areas. On the left side of the tracks, facing Portbou, is the main passenger building with two floors. The ground floor has the lobby with ticket offices (both staffed and electronic), customer lounge, kiosk, and a cafeteria.

Opened in 1877, Figueres station has an uncertain future due to the arrival of the high-speed line at a new station called Figueres-Vilafant. Officially called a "provisional station", it is far from the centers of either Figueres or Vilafant. The only car parking available is in an enclosed, paid lot. The current plan calls for moving all train service for Figueres to this new station and to close the old station, although this has been met with a great deal of opposition.

== Rail services ==
Preceding station	Rodalies de Catalunya	Following station
Vilamalla towards L'Hospitalet de Llobregat	RG1	Vilajuïga towards Portbou
Vilamalla Regional (R) services only towards Barcelona Sants	R11	Vilajuïga Regional (R) services only towards Cerbère
