= Nava =

Nava or NAVA may refer to:

== Organizations ==
- National Association for the Visual Arts in Australia
- North American Vexillological Association

== Places ==
- Nava, Jõgeva County, Estonia, a village
- Nava, Saare County, Estonia, a village
- Nava, Mazandaran, Iran, a village
- Nava, Coahuila, Mexico, a city
- Nava (municipality), Mexico
- Nava, Asturias, Spain, a municipality
- La Nava, Huelva, Spain, a town and municipality

== Other uses ==
- Nava (surname)
- Nava (given name)
- Neurally adjusted ventilatory assist, a mode of ventilation
- Navā, a dastgah in Persian traditional music
- Nava, a Milan-based music group consisting of Francesco Fugazza, Nava Golchini, Elia Pastori and Marco Fugazza.

== See also ==
- Navas (disambiguation)
