= Navas =

Navas may refer to:

- Navas (surname), a Spanish surname
- Navas, Sant Andreu, a neighborhood of Barcelona, Catalonia, Spain
- Navas (Barcelona Metro), a railway station in the Sant Andreu district, Catalonia, Spain
- Navàs, a town and municipality in the province of Barcelona, Catalonia, Spain

Las Navas may refer to:

- Las Navas, Northern Samar, a municipality in the Philippines
- Las Navas de Jadraque, municipality in the province of Guadalajara, Castile-La Mancha, Spain
- Las Navas del Marqués, municipality in the province of Ávila, Castile and León, Spain
- Las Navas de la Concepción, village in the province of Seville, Andalusia, Spain

== See also ==
- Nava (disambiguation)
