= Meridiana Tunnel =

Railway tunnel in Barcelona

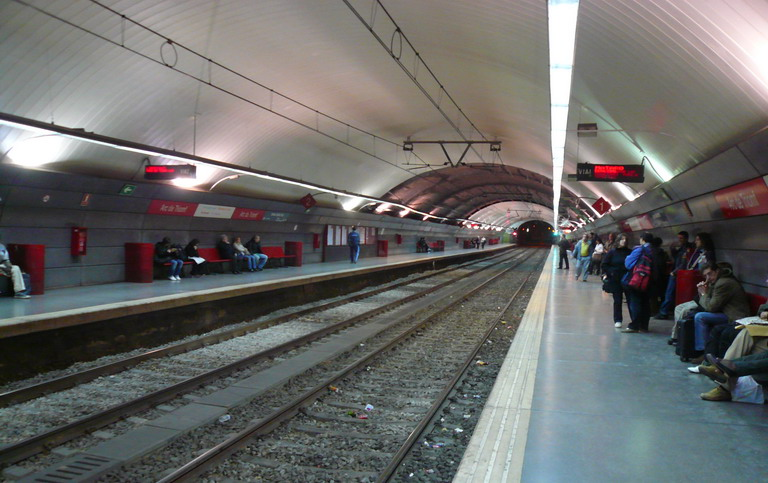
- Barcelona Arc de Triomf station, a stop in the Meridiana Tunnel

Overview
- Owner: Adif
- Locale: Barcelona, Spain
- Termini: Barcelona Sants; Sant Andreu Arenal
- Stations: 5

Service
- Type: Commuter rail
- System: Rodalies de Catalunya
- Operator(s): Renfe

History
- Opened: 1970s

Technical
- Track gauge: 1,668 mm (5 ft 5 21/32 in) Iberian gauge

The Meridiana Tunnel is a railway tunnel in the Spanish city of Barcelona. Built in the 1970s, it replaced the previously existing railway that ran in a cutting in the middle of Avinguda Meridiana through the city centre.

== Services ==
The tunnel is served by Rodalies de Catalunya services R1, R3, R4 and R7.

== Stations ==
- Barcelona Sants
- Plaça de Catalunya
- Arc de Triomf
- La Sagrera-Meridiana
- Sant Andreu Arenal

== See also ==
- Aragó Tunnel
