= Fabra i Puig station =

Fabra i Puig station may refer to:

- Fabra i Puig station (Barcelona Metro)
- Fabra i Puig railway station
