= Llefià station =

Metro station in Barcelona, Spain

Llefià
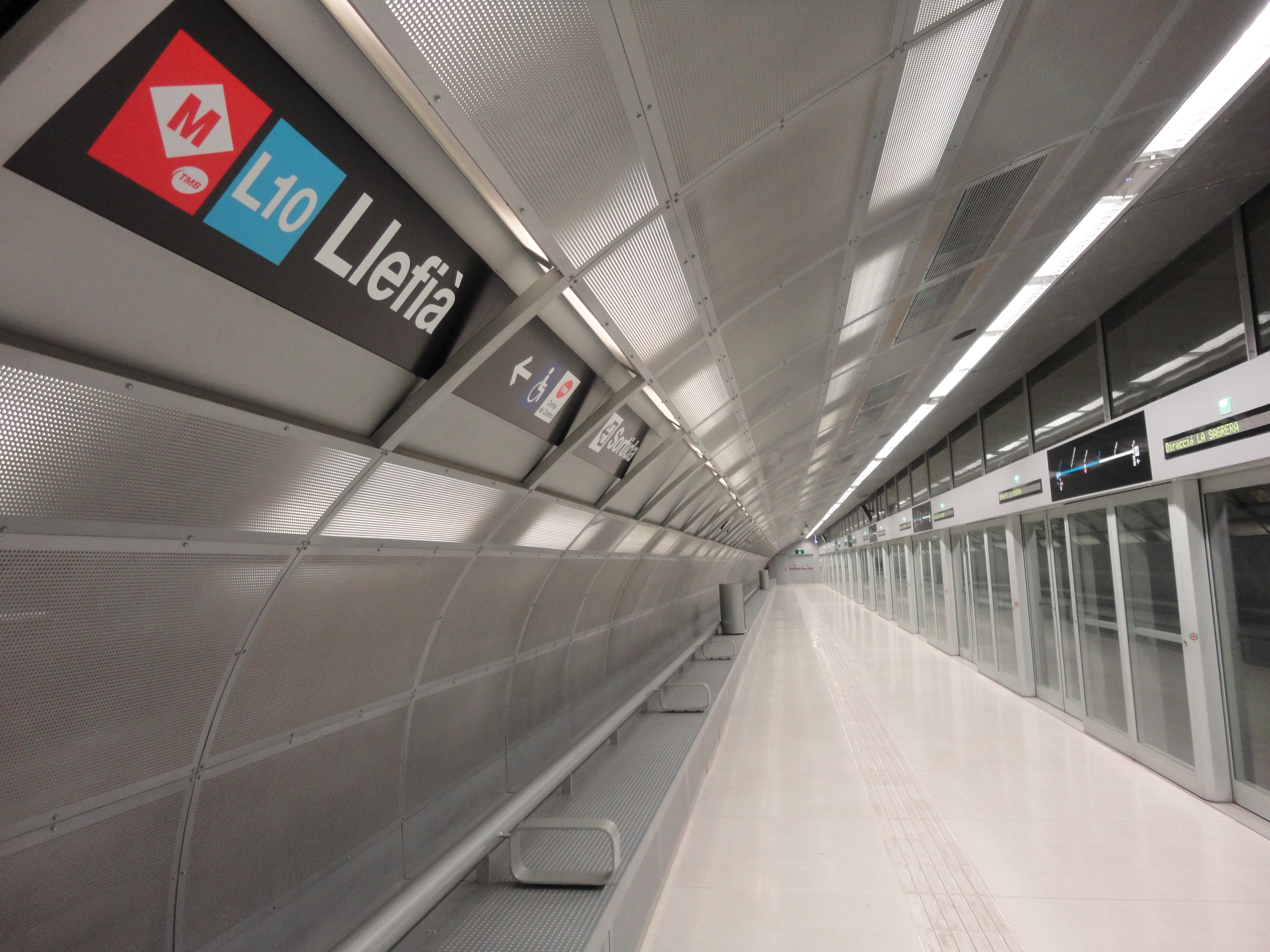
- A platform of the station

General information
- Location: Avinguda d'Amèrica, s/n 08913 Badalona
- Coordinates: 41°26′28.72″N 2°13′03.01″E
- System: TMB rapid transit station
- Operator: Transports Metropolitans de Barcelona
- Platforms: 2 split platforms
- Tracks: 2
- Connections: Local and interurban buses

Construction
- Structure type: Underground
- Depth: 32 metres (105 ft)
- Platform levels: 4
- Accessible: yes

Other information
- Fare zone: 1 (Autoritat del Transport Metropolità)

History
- Opened: 18 April 2010

Services
Preceding station	Metro	Following station
Bon Pastor towards La Sagrera	L10 Nord	La Salut towards Gorg
Projected
Bon Pastor towards Polígon Pratenc	L10	La Salut towards Gorg
Location

Llefià (Catalan pronunciation: [ʎəfiˈa]) is a Barcelona Metro station named after the neighbourhood of the same name where the station is situated, near Llefià Market, in Badalona municipality. This neighbourhood is one of Badalona's with highest population density and built in a very uneven piece of land. The station was opened on 18 April 2010 with the opening of the line from Gorg to Bon Pastor. It is served by TMB-operated Barcelona Metro line L10.

== Layout ==
The station is located under the intersection between Ronda Sant Antoni de Llefià and Avinguda d'Amèrica and it was built, like many other new L9/L10 metro stations, with a 32-meter depth and 26-meter diameter well. The station is divided into four levels: the upper hall, the pre-platform, the upper platform and the lower platform. The upper hall is located at the same level as the street, in a building built specifically for this purpose. It has three accesses from the street, all equipped with fixed stairs, escalators and elevators, and making the station accessible for disabled persons. The upper hall has also ticket vending machines and a TMB Control Center. The upper platform is where the trains run towards La Sagrera and the lower platform is where the trains run towards Gorg. The architectural design of the station was designed by architect Alfons Soldevila Barbosa.

== Gallery ==
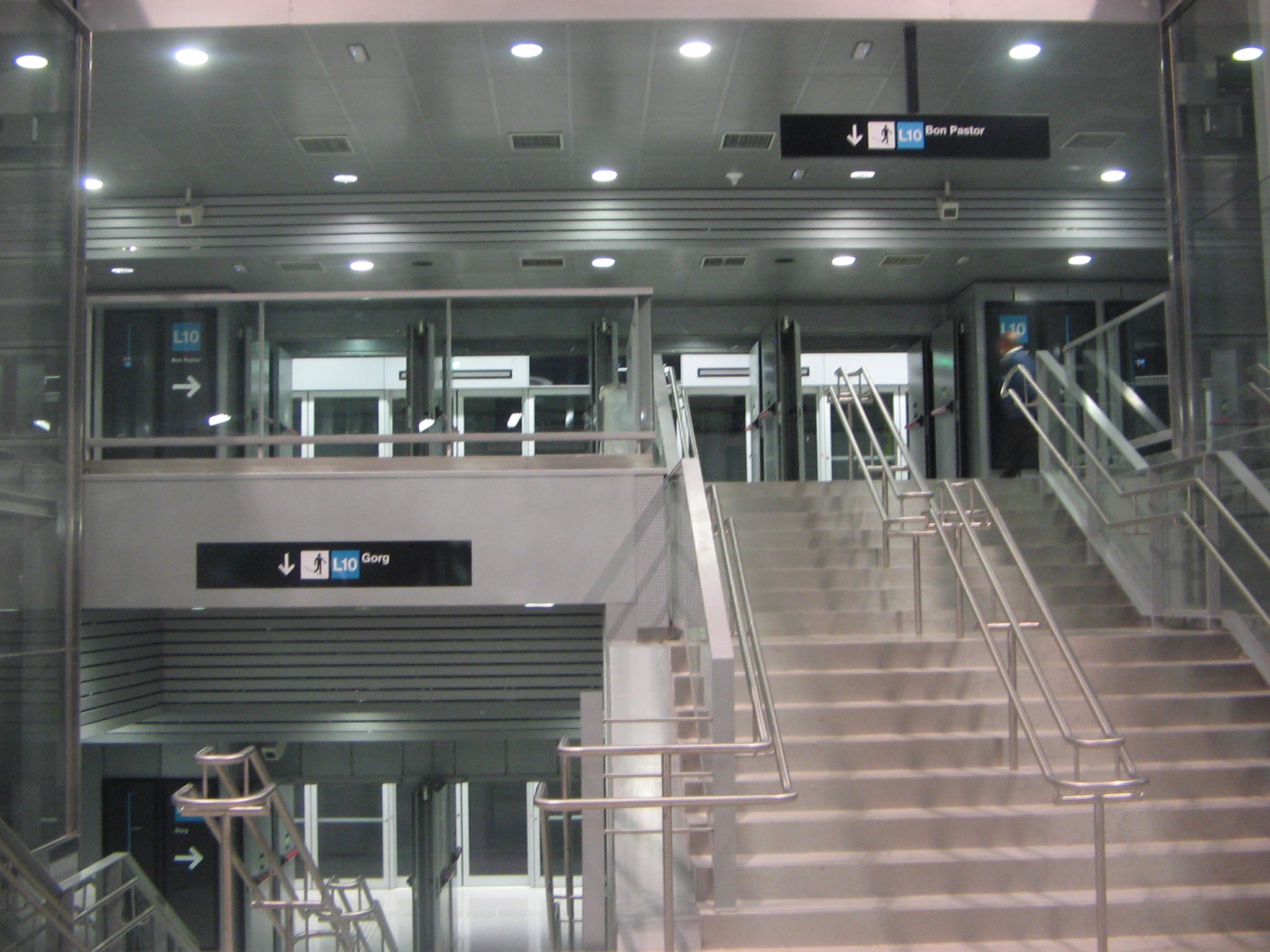
Stairs on the pre-platform level to the upper platform and the lower platform

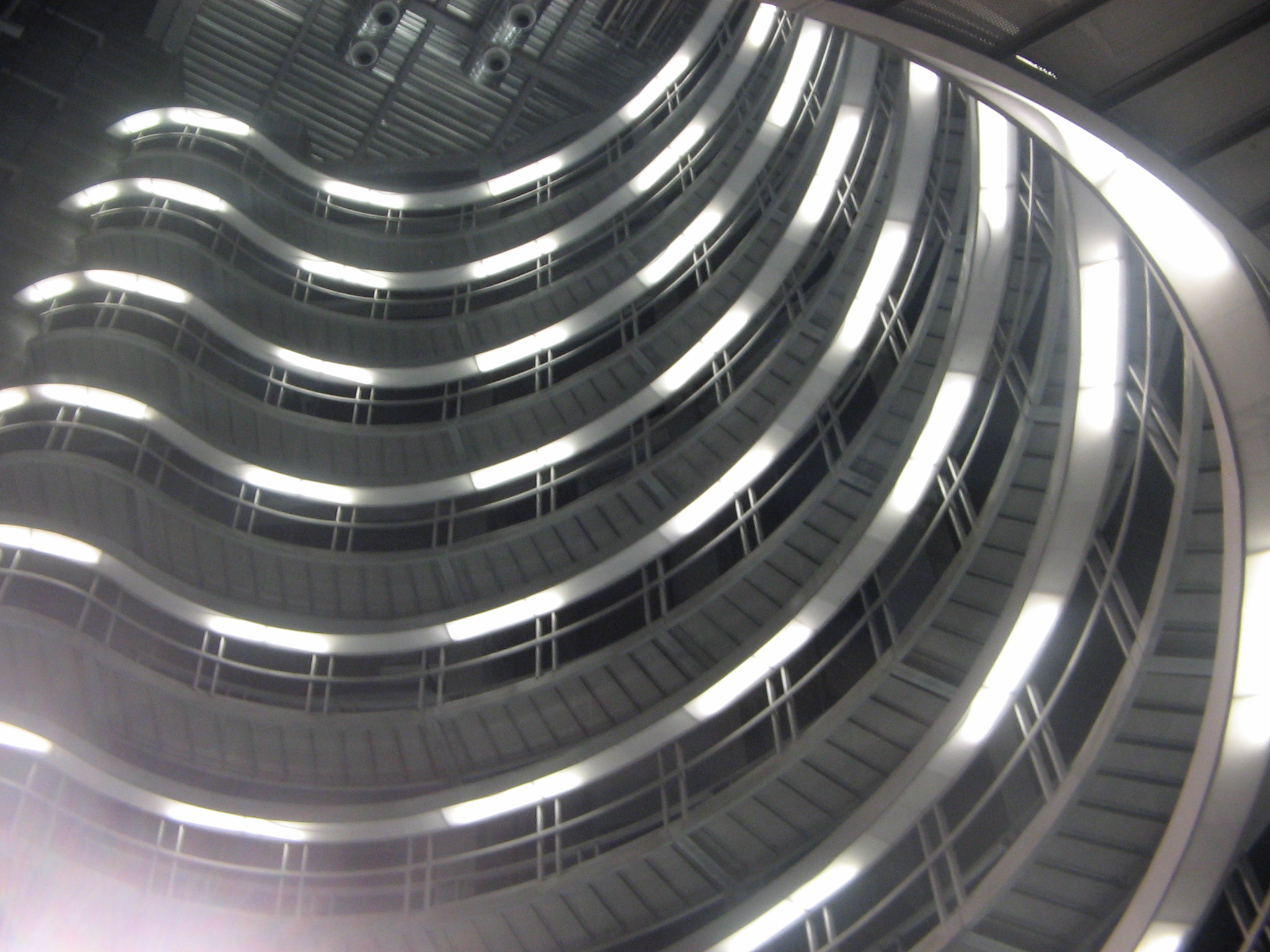
Side view of the well from the pre-platform level

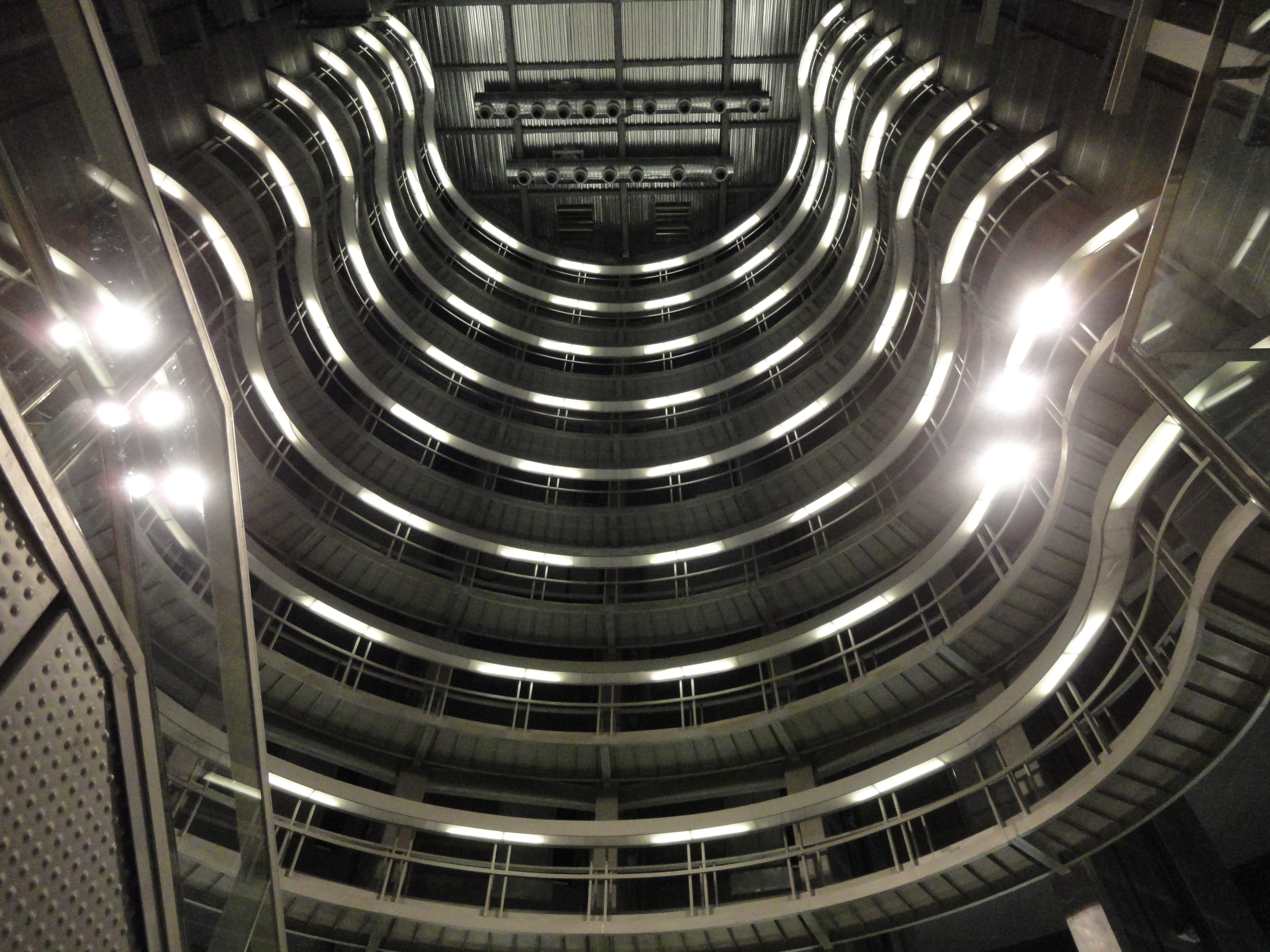
Full view of the well where the ventilation system of the station can be seen
