= R7 (Rodalies de Catalunya) =

Commuter rail line in Barcelona

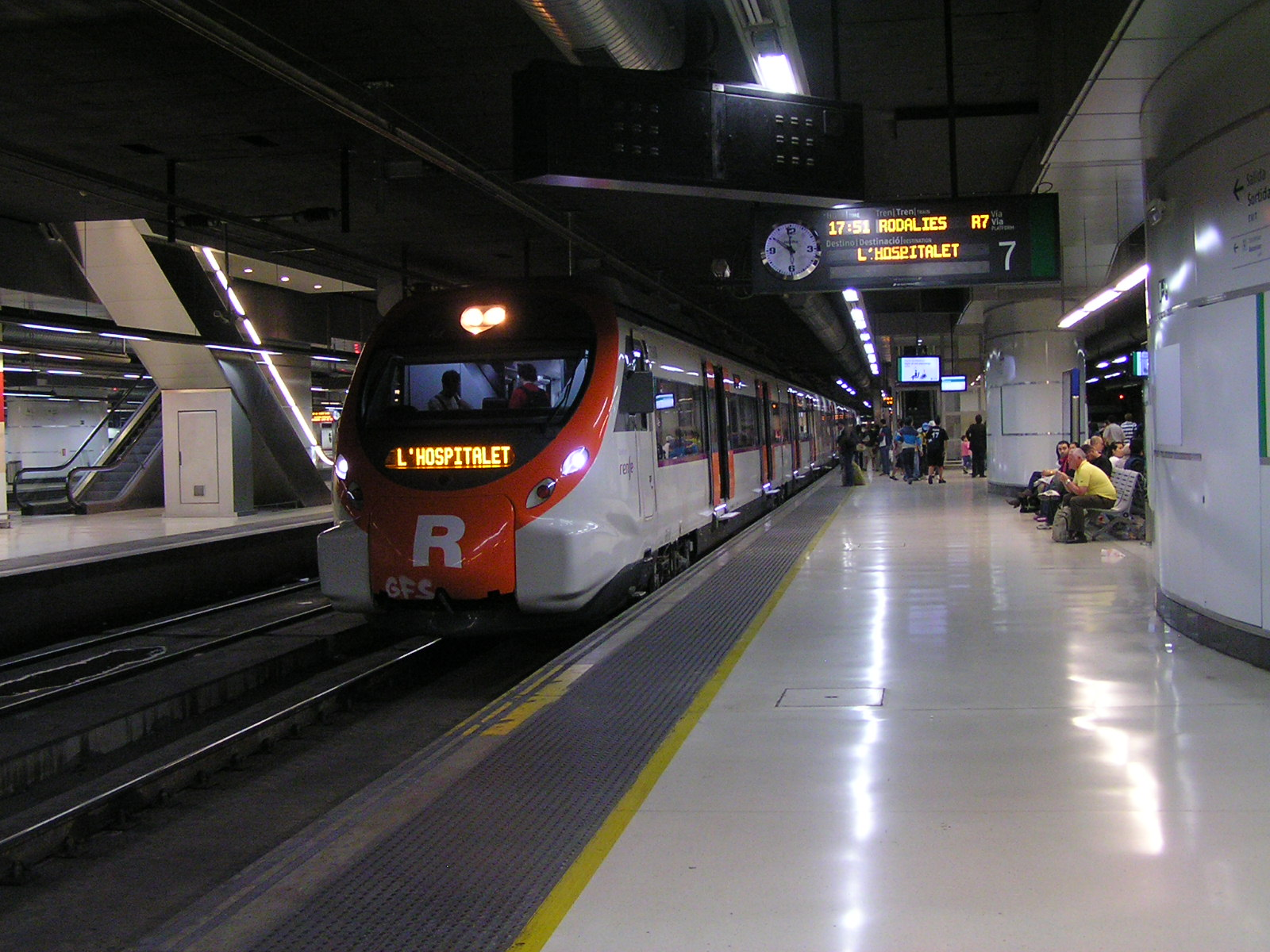
- A Civia train on a R7 service between Cerdanyola Universitat and L'Hospitalet de Llobregat stations at Barcelona Sants railway station in 2011.

Overview
- Service type: Commuter rail
- Status: Operational
- Locale: Barcelona metropolitan area
- First service: 23 May 2005
- Current operator: Renfe Operadora
- Ridership: 8,140 (2010)
- Annual ridership: 1,901,2014 (2010)

Route
- Termini: Barcelona Sant Andreu Arenal; Cerdanyola Universitat
- Stops: 7
- Distance travelled: 13.5 km (8.4 mi)
- Average journey time: 19 min
- Service frequency: Every 15 min–1 h
- Lines used: Lleida–Manresa–Barcelona; Castellbisbal–Mollet-Sant Fost

Technical
- Rolling stock: Civia EMUs
- Track gauge: 1,668 mm (5 ft 5 21/32 in) Iberian gauge
- Electrification: 3,000 V DC overhead lines
- Track owner: Adif

The R7 is a line of Rodalies de Catalunya's Barcelona commuter rail service, operated by Renfe Operadora. It links Sant Andreu Arenal railway station in northern Barcelona with Cerdanyola Universitat railway station, which serves the Bellaterra campus of the Autonomous University of Barcelona. The R7 shares tracks for most of its length with Barcelona commuter rail service lines R3 and R4, as well as regional rail line R12. According to 2010 data, the line's average weekday ridership is 8,140.

R7 services started operating in 2005, initially running between Martorell and L'Hospitalet de Llobregat stations, via the Vallès Occidental region. The line used most part of the Castellbisbal–Mollet-Sant Fost railway, and the entire Meridiana Tunnel through central Barcelona. It became the first passenger service to use the Castellbisbal–Mollet-Sant Fost railway, originally designed to serve as Barcelona's rail freight bypass. In 2011, the R7 was shortened, so that it began to operate in its current configuration between Sant Andreu Arenal and Cerdanyola Universitat stations. Most part of its original route was then taken over by the R8, which came into service the same year, running between Martorell and Granollers. In the long-term future, it is projected that the R7 will be extended southwards to Barcelona–El Prat Airport, using the Meridiana Tunnel.

== List of stations ==
The following table lists the name of each station served by line R7 in order from south to north; the station's service pattern offered by R7 trains; the transfers to other Rodalies de Catalunya lines, including both commuter and regional rail services; remarkable transfers to other transport systems; the municipality in which each station is located; and the fare zone each station belongs to according to the Autoritat del Transport Metropolità (ATM Àrea de Barcelona) fare-integrated public transport system and Rodalies de Catalunya's own fare zone system for Barcelona commuter rail service lines.

#	Terminal of a service
*	Transfer station to other transport systems
#*	Transfer station and terminal
●	Station served by all trains running through it
○	Limited service station

Station	Service	Rodalies de Catalunya transfers	Other transfers	Municipality	Fare zone	
Station	Service	Rodalies de Catalunya transfers	Other transfers	Municipality	ATM AdB	Rod
Barcelona Sant Andreu Arenal#*	●	R3, R4, R12	Barcelona Metro line 1 at Fabra i Puig station National coach services	Barcelona	1	1
Barcelona Torre del Baró*	●	R3, R4, R12	Barcelona Metro line 11 at Torre Baró – Vallbona station	Barcelona	1	1
Montcada Bifurcació	●	R3, R4, R12	—	Montcada i Reixac	1	1
Montcada i Reixac-Manresa	●	R4, R12	—	Montcada i Reixac	1	1
Montcada i Reixac-Santa Maria	●	R4, R12	—	Montcada i Reixac	1	1
Cerdanyola del Vallès	●	R4, R12	—	Cerdanyola del Vallès	2C	2
Cerdanyola Universitat#	●	R8	—	Cerdanyola del Vallès	2C	3
