= Nivas =

Nivas is a given name and a surname. Notable people with the name include:

Given name:

- Deepak Nivas Hudda (born 1994), Indian professional Kabaddi player, captain of India national kabaddi team
- Lakshmi Nivas Mittal (born 1950), Indian steel magnate based in the United Kingdom
- Nivas K. Prasanna, Indian music director and singer who works in Tamil film industry

Surname:

- Eeshwar Nivas, Indian film director, known for his works in Bollywood and Tollywood
- P. S. Nivas, Indian cinematographer, film director and producer in Malayalam, Tamil, Telugu, and Hindi cinema

== See also ==
- Jyoti Nivas College, Bangalore, college in Bangalore, India, situated in the heart of Koramangala
- Hypolimnas nivas or Hypolimnas anomala, the Malayan eggfly or crow eggfly
- Lakshmi Nivas Palace, a palace and heritage hotel in Bikaner in the Indian state of Rajasthan
- Raj Nivas, Puducherry (Raj Nivas, Pondicherry), official residence of the Lieutenant Governor of Puducherry
- Anievas
- Navas (disambiguation)
- Navis
- Navàs
- Neves (disambiguation)
- Nevis
- Nevus
- Nieves
- Nivash
- Nives
