= La Salut station =

Metro station in Barcelona, Spain

La Salut
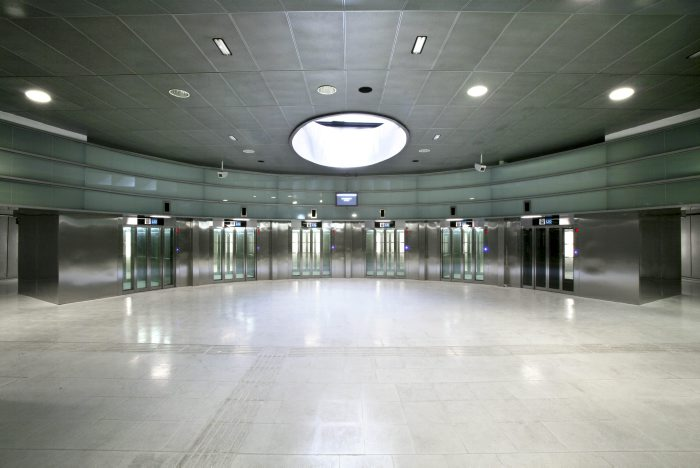
- Elevators at the station hall

General information
- Location: Marquès de Sant Mori, s/n 08914 Badalona
- Coordinates: 41°26′32.47″N 2°13′26.47″E
- System: TMB rapid transit station
- Operator: Transports Metropolitans de Barcelona
- Platforms: 2 split platforms
- Tracks: 2
- Connections: Local and interurban buses

Construction
- Structure type: Underground
- Depth: 22 metres (72 ft)
- Platform levels: 4
- Accessible: yes

Other information
- Fare zone: 1 (Autoritat del Transport Metropolità)

History
- Opened: 18 April 2010

Services
Preceding station	Metro	Following station
Llefià towards La Sagrera	L10 Nord	Gorg Terminus
Projected
Llefià towards Polígon Pratenc	L10	Gorg Terminus
Location

La Salut (Catalan pronunciation: [lə səˈlut]) is a Barcelona Metro station named after the neighbourhood of the same name where the station is situated, in Badalona municipality. It was opened on 18 April 2010 with the opening of the line from Gorg to Bon Pastor. It is served by TMB-operated Barcelona Metro line L10.

== Layout ==
The station is located under the intersection of Avinguda del Marquès de Sant Morí and Salvador Seguí, Quevedo and Pau Piferrer streets. The station was built like many other new L9/L10 metro stations with a 22-meter depth well, this time however the well is not circular but it is square. It is divided in four levels: the upper hall, the pre-platform, the upper platform and the lower platform. The upper hall has four accesses from the street, all equipped with escalators and elevators, and making the station accessible. One of the accesses goes directly to the upper hall and the other accesses join it through a corridor. The upper hall has also ticket vending machines and a TMB Control Center. The upper platform is where run the trains toward La Sagrera and the lower platform is where run the trains toward Gorg. The architectural design of the station was designed by architect Alfons Soldevila Barbosa.

== Gallery ==
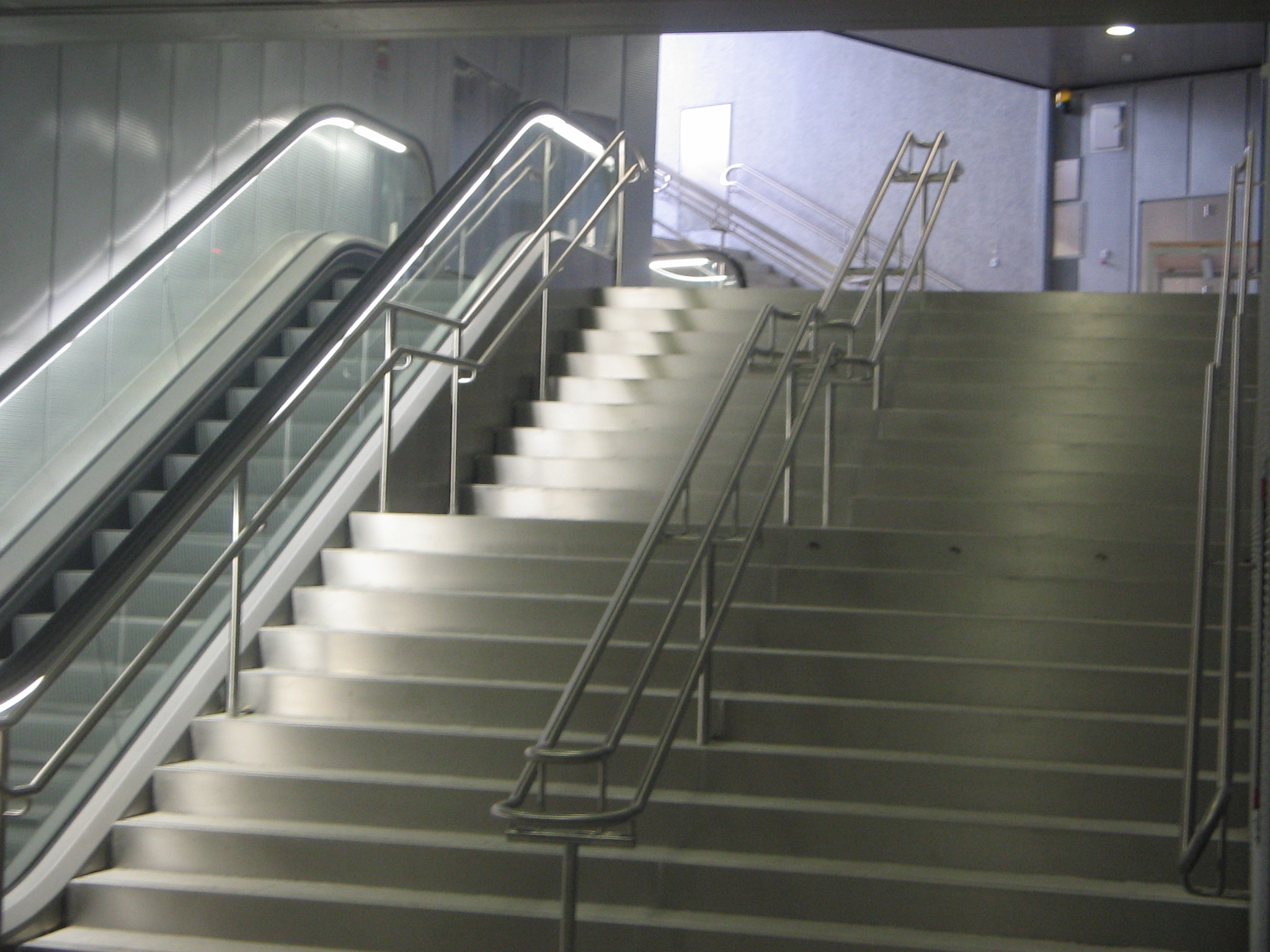
Escalators and fixed stairs at the access to the upper hall from the street

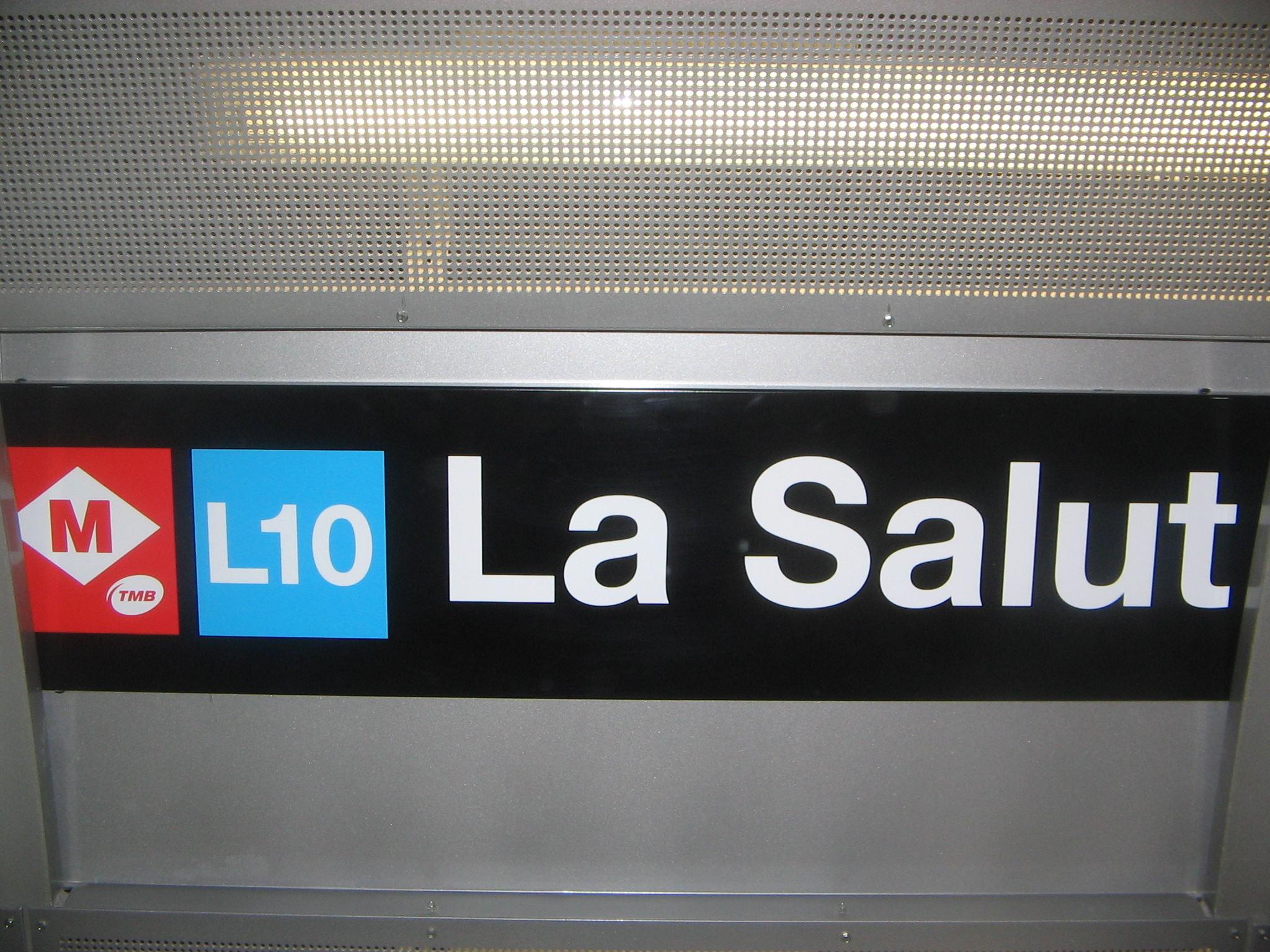
Closeup of the station at one of the entrances
