= Avinguda Meridiana =

Road in Barcelona, Spain

Coordinates: 41°25′18.99″N 2°11′12.65″E

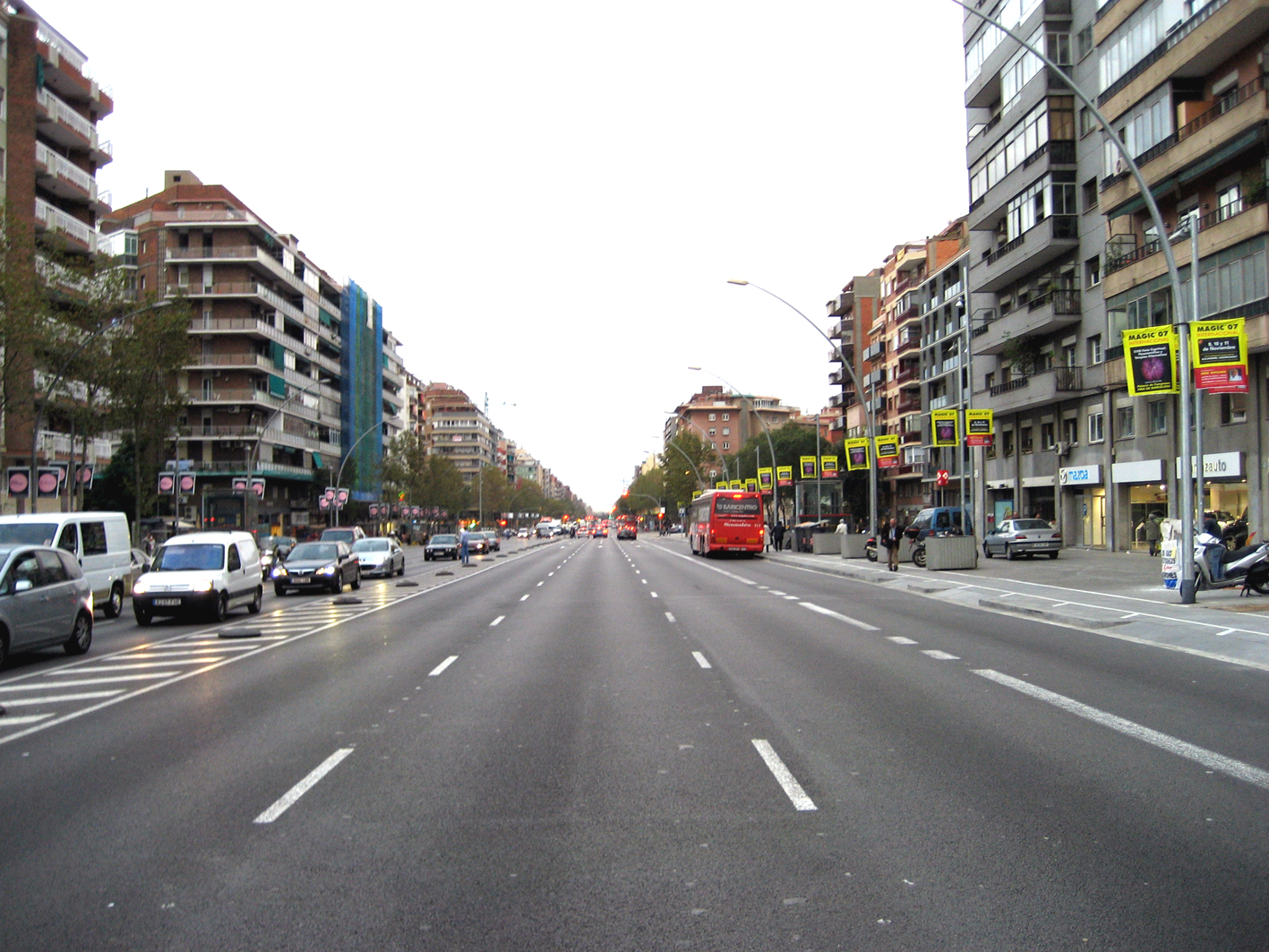
Avinguda Meridiana

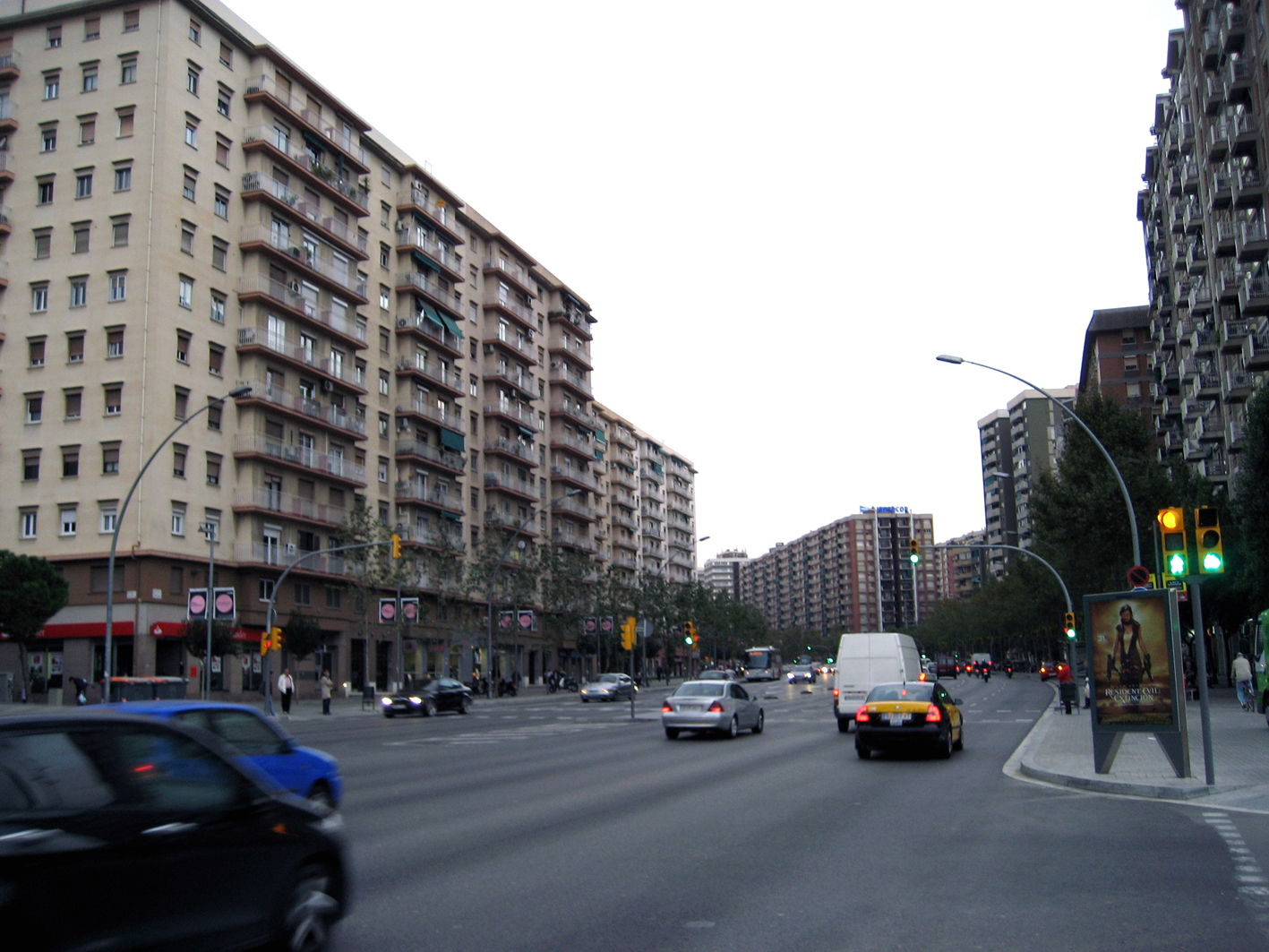
Avinguda Meridiana

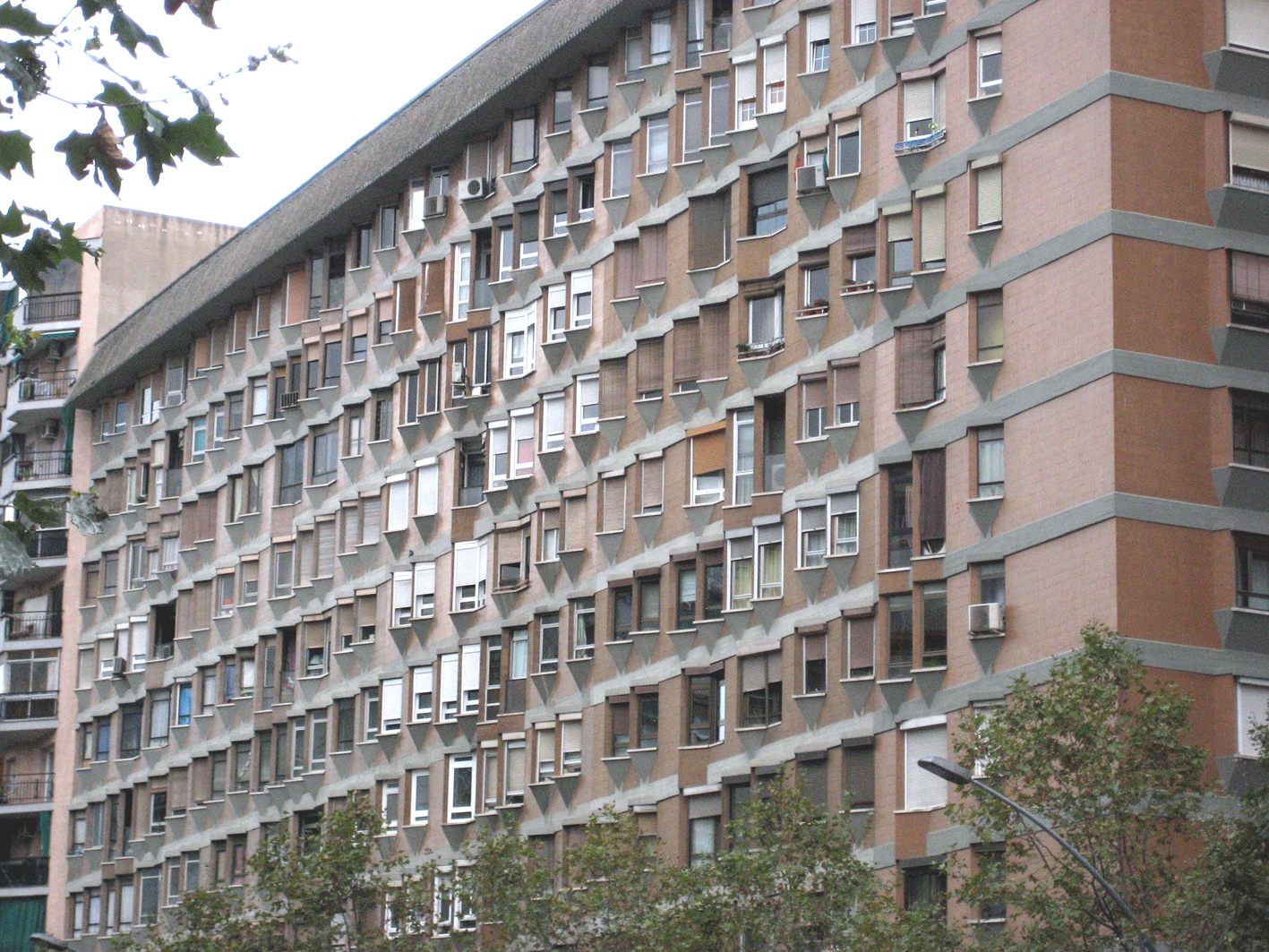
Edifici Meridiana, an apartment block designed by Oriol Bohigas.

Avinguda Meridiana (Catalan pronunciation: [əβiŋˈɡuðə məɾiðiˈanə]) is a major avenue in Barcelona, Catalonia, Spain, spanning parts of the Sant Andreu, Nou Barris and Sant Martí northern districts of the city. Originally planned by Ildefons Cerdà in 1859 to be one of the two most important thoroughfares in Barcelona, its actual role has not been exactly so but still has become a much transited route linking Parc de la Ciutadella with northern parts of Barcelona, crossing Plaça de les Glòries in its way, where it meets other two major avenues: Gran Via de les Corts Catalanes and Avinguda Diagonal. It absorbs the traffic coming from the AP-7 motorway, which makes it a densely transited area. The avenue goes through the following neighbourhoods of Barcelona: El Clot, Navas, La Sagrera, Sant Andreu de Palomar, El Congrés i els Indians, Vilapicina, Porta, La Prosperitat, La Trinitat Nova, Trinitat Vella and Vallbona, largely working-class areas of the city.

Architecturally, the area is blunt and lacking in aesthetic pretension, but includes a few significant apartment blocks such as the Meridiana tower blocks by Oriol Bohigas, Josep Maria Martorell and David Mackay. Avinguda Meridiana symbolizes instrumental urbanism, being little more than an urban motorway, and very different from Barcelona's main avenues and boulevards.

On 19 June 1987, the Basque separatist group ETA planted a bomb in the basement of a Hipercor hypermarket in this avenue that killed 21 people. 41 were injured.

== Transport ==
=== Metro stations ===
- Torras i Bages (L1)
- Fabra i Puig (L1)
- Sagrera-Meridiana (L1, L5, L9, L10)
- Navas (L1)
- Clot (L1, L2)
- Glòries (L1, T4, T5)
- Marina (L1)

=== Train stations ===
- Sant Andreu Arenal, interconnected with Fabra i Puig metro station. (R3, R4), Rodalies Barcelona line R7, Ca1, Ca2, Ca3, Ca4, Ca6, R42)
- Clot-Aragó, interconnected with Clot metro station, (R1, R2, Ca1, Ca2, Ca3, Ca4, Ca6, R42)

== See also ==
- Avinguda del Paral·lel
- 1987 Hipercor bombing
- Street names in Barcelona
- Urban planning of Barcelona
