= La Sagrera =

Coordinates: 41°25′20.49″N 2°11′10.75″E

- Neighborhood of Barcelona
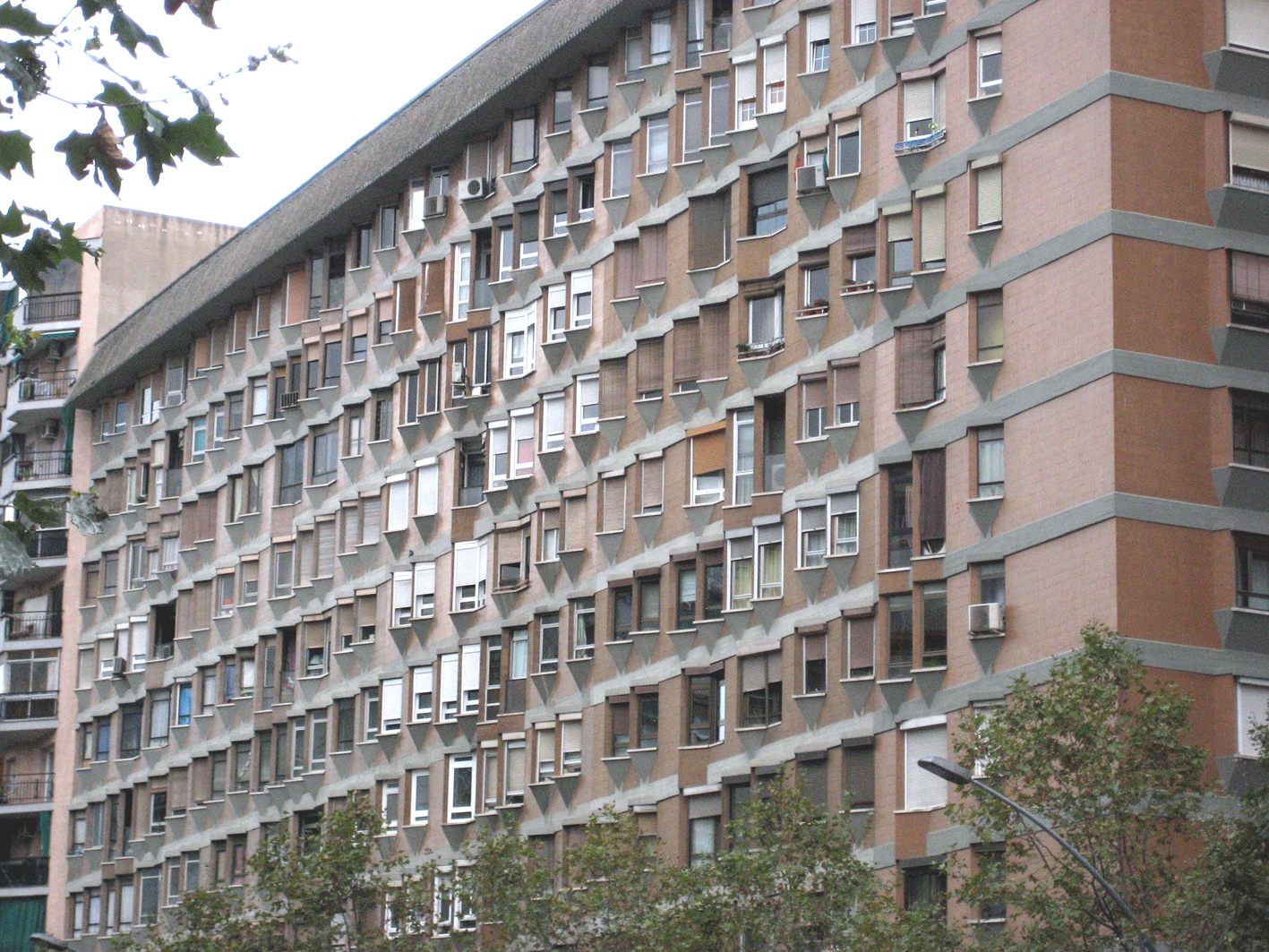
- Building in the neighbourhood of La Sagrera, work dated 1965 by the architect Oriol Bohigas
- Interactive map of La Sagrera
- Country: Spain
- Autonomous community: Catalonia
- Province: Barcelona
- Comarca: Barcelonès
- Municipality: Barcelona
- District: Sant Andreu

Area
  - Total: 0.972 km^{2} (0.375 sq mi)

Population
  - Total: 28,710
  - Density: 29,500/km^{2} (76,500/sq mi)
- Demonym(s): sagrerenc, -a

La Sagrera (Catalan pronunciation: [lə səˈɣɾeɾə], Spanish: [la saˈɣɾeɾa]) is a neighborhood of Barcelona.

== Geography ==
La Sagrera is bordered to the north by Sant Andreu del Palomar and to the east by the neighborhood of La Verneda; included by the south end is the zone named Navas, and to the west the Congress area.

The neighborhood of La Sagrera is integrated with the 9th district of the city of Barcelona, officially taking the name of Sant Andreu (Saint Andrew), although it was instead part of Sant Martí de Provençals. La Sagrera keeps closer links with Sant Andreu del Palomar than with other nearby neighborhoods.

== History ==
This name La Sagrera dates to the 11th century when the farmers of Catalonia lived under the feudal system. The Abbot Oliba, seeing the need to protect farmers, created a space of 30 acres around the churches in which people and goods would be secured from assault. In these spaces, the farmers built some small buildings called sagrers in Catalan, which they used to store their harvests.

The first documented mention of La Sagrera is dated 998 and references a group of houses, some with fortified towers, around the sagrera of the parish church of Sant Martí de Provençals. The population remained small for centuries, and by 1877 only some 48 houses could be found in the settlement's core. From the last third of the 19th century, the area became an industrial neighborhood, dominated by metallurgy and textile sectors. The name La Sagrera was retained only for the core zone of pre-existing housing.

In 1877, a steam tramway was built connecting the neighbourhood with Horta-Guinardó. By 1885 the connection linked La Sagrera with Barcelona, strengthened by the 1901 electrification of the line. The industrialisation of the district saw the opening of the factory Hispano-Suiza in 1911 (renamed ENASA in 1946). This factory moved south to the Zona Franca by 1971. Currently, a group of apartment buildings, schools and a park named Pegaso is there. In this (continuing) process, houses and workshops have been replaced by many blocks of apartments.

The transformation of the neighbourhood continues, particularly with Sagrera railway station, currently under constriction, which will link up the Barcelona Metro with local, regional and high-speed rail, with urban buses and with taxi services. The neighbourhood of La Sagrera is well-supported by underground transport, with rodalia R3 and R4, plus Metro lines L1, L5, L9 and L10, (the last two under construction).

== Popular culture ==
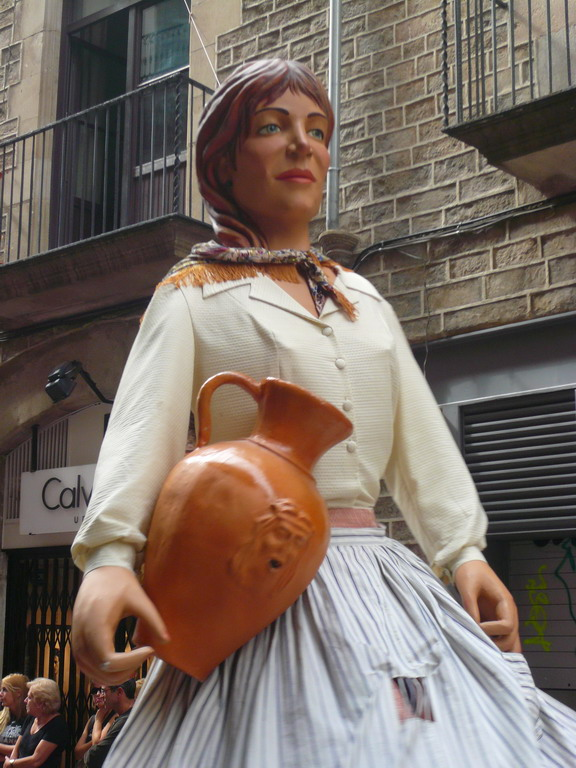
The giant Sagrerina

Since 2003, La Sagrera has had a "gegantera group". The so-called "gegants", which translates as "Giants", are a popular folk that amuse children throughout Catalonia. A gang of such giants is found in La Sagrera.

== Entities ==
- Drac i Diables de la Sagrera
- Colla Gegantera de la Sagrera
- Esbart L'Estel de la Sagrera
- Associació Esportiva Districte IX Sant Andreu
- Centre de Documentació de la Sagrera
- Esplai 'la Sagrera'

== See also ==
- Archaeologic zone of the Sagrera
- Tunnel of Provença
