= Camp de l'Arpa station =

Metro station in Barcelona, Spain

Coordinates: 41°24′54″N 2°10′52″E

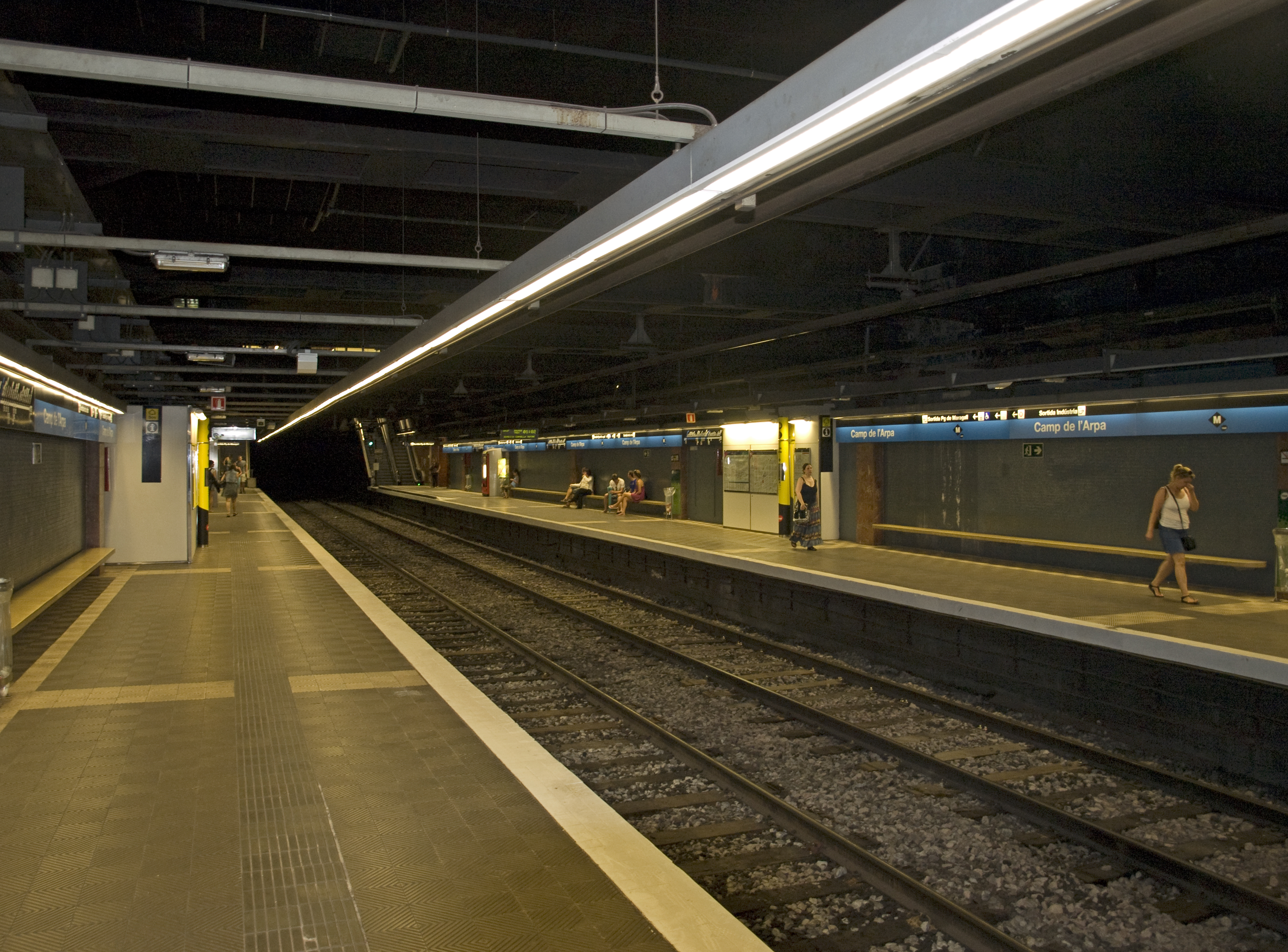
Station platforms

Camp de l'Arpa (Catalan pronunciation: [ˈkam də ˈlarpə]) is a station on line 5 of the Barcelona Metro. It is named after the neighbourhood of the same name in the Sant Martí district.

The station is located underneath Carrer Indústria, between Passeig Maragall and Carrer Guinardó. It was opened in 1970.

The side-platform station has a ticket hall on either end, each with one access, on Carrer Indústria and Passeig Maragall.

== Services ==
Preceding station	Metro	Following station
Sant Pau | Dos de Maig towards Cornellà Centre	L5	Sagrera towards Vall d'Hebron
