= Neva (name) =

Neva is a feminine given name and a surname. It may refer to:

== Given name ==
- Neva Abelson (1910–2000), American pediatrician and medical researcher
- Neva Boyd (1876–1963), American sociologist
- Neva Brasfield (1889–1980), half of the American comedy duo Uncle Cyp and Aunt Sap Brasfield
- Neva Carr Glyn (1908–1975), Australian actress
- Neva Dinova, namesake of the American band Neva Dinova, grandmother of one of the members
- Neva Edwards (born 1931), educator, lay preacher and former civil servant in Dominica
- Neva Gerber (1894–1974), American silent film actress
- Neva Goodwin (born 1944), American economist
- Neva Haites, Australian geneticist
- Neva Jane Langley (1933–2012), American beauty pageant queen, Miss America 1953
- Neva Leoni (born 1992), Italian actress
- Neva Morris (1895–2010), American supercentenarian
- Neva Patterson (1920–2010), American actress
- Neva Pilgrim (1938–2024), American soprano
- Neva Tölle (born 1956) Croatian feminist activist

== Surname ==
- Franklin A. Neva (1922–2011), American virologist and physician
- Samuel Néva (born 1981), French footballer

== See also ==
- Nava (given name), a feminine given name
- Alan Harris Nevas (1928–2025), American judge
