= Sant Pau/Dos de Maig station =

Metro station in Barcelona, Spain

Coordinates: 41.411°N 2.176°E

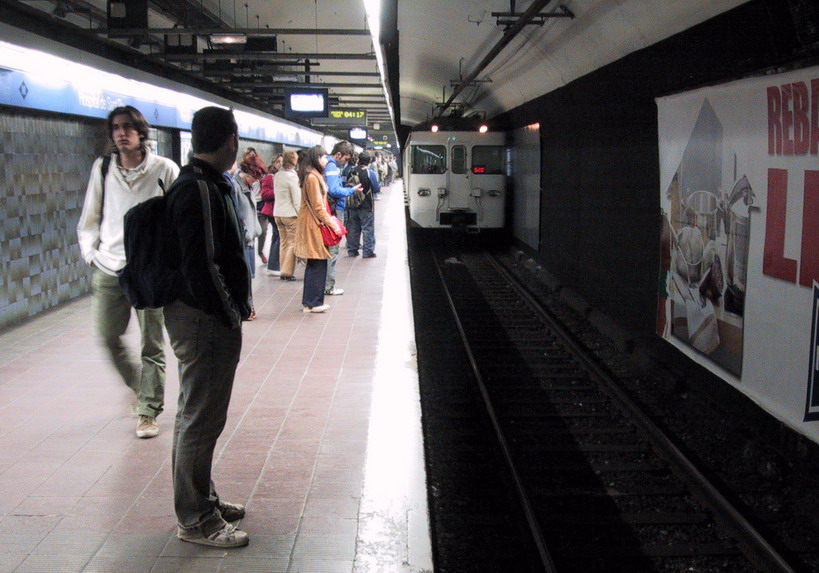
A view of the station's platforms.

Sant Pau | Dos de Maig (Catalan pronunciation: [ˌsam ˈpaw ˈðoz ðə ˈmatʃ]) is a station on L5 of the Barcelona Metro.

Named for the Hospital de Sant Pau World Heritage Site which it serves, the station is located underneath Carrer de la Indústria in the Eixample, between Carrer Cartagena and Carrer Dos de Maig. It was opened in 1970. Its previous name, before 2009, was Hospital de Sant Pau.

The separate-platform station has a ticket hall on either end, each with one access, on Carrer Cartagena and Carrer Dos de Maig/Indústria.

== Services ==
Preceding station	Metro	Following station
Sagrada Família towards Cornellà Centre	L5	Camp de l'Arpa towards Vall d'Hebron

== See also ==
- Hospital de Sant Pau
- Guinardó-Hospital de Sant Pau
