= Nava (given name) =

Nava is a female given name. In Persian (نوا) its meaning is "tune" or "melody." In Hebrew (נאוה) and Arabic its meaning is "pretty."

Notable people with the name include:

- Nava Arad (1938–2022), Israeli politician
- Nava Ashraf, Canadian economist and academic
- Nava Boker (born 1970), Israeli journalist and politician
- Nava Lubelski (born 1968), American artist
- Nava Macmel-Atir (born 1964), Israeli author, playwright and poet
- Nava Semel (1954–2017), Israeli author, playwright and screenwriter
- Nava Starr (born 1949), Canadian chess player

== See also ==
- Neva (name)
