= Neurally adjusted ventilatory assist =

Mode of mechanical ventilation

- Specialty: Pulmonary

Neurally adjusted ventilatory assist (NAVA) is a mode of mechanical ventilation. NAVA delivers assistance in proportion to and in synchrony with the patient's respiratory efforts, as reflected by an electrical signal. This signal represents the electrical activity of the diaphragm, the body's principal breathing muscle.

The act of taking a breath is controlled by the respiratory center of the brain, which decides the characteristics of each breath, timing and size. The respiratory center sends a signal along the phrenic nerve, which excites the diaphragm muscle cells, leading to muscle contraction and descent of the diaphragm dome. As a result, the pressure in the airway drops, causing an inflow of air into the lungs.

With NAVA, the electrical activity of the diaphragm (Edi) is captured, fed to the ventilator and used to assist the patient's breathing in synchrony with and in proportion to the patient's own efforts, regardless of patient category or size. As the work of the ventilator and the diaphragm is controlled by the same signal, coupling between the diaphragm and the SERVO-i ventilator is synchronized simultaneously.
