= Navas station =

Metro station in Barcelona, Spain

Coordinates: 41°24′56″N 2°11′13″E

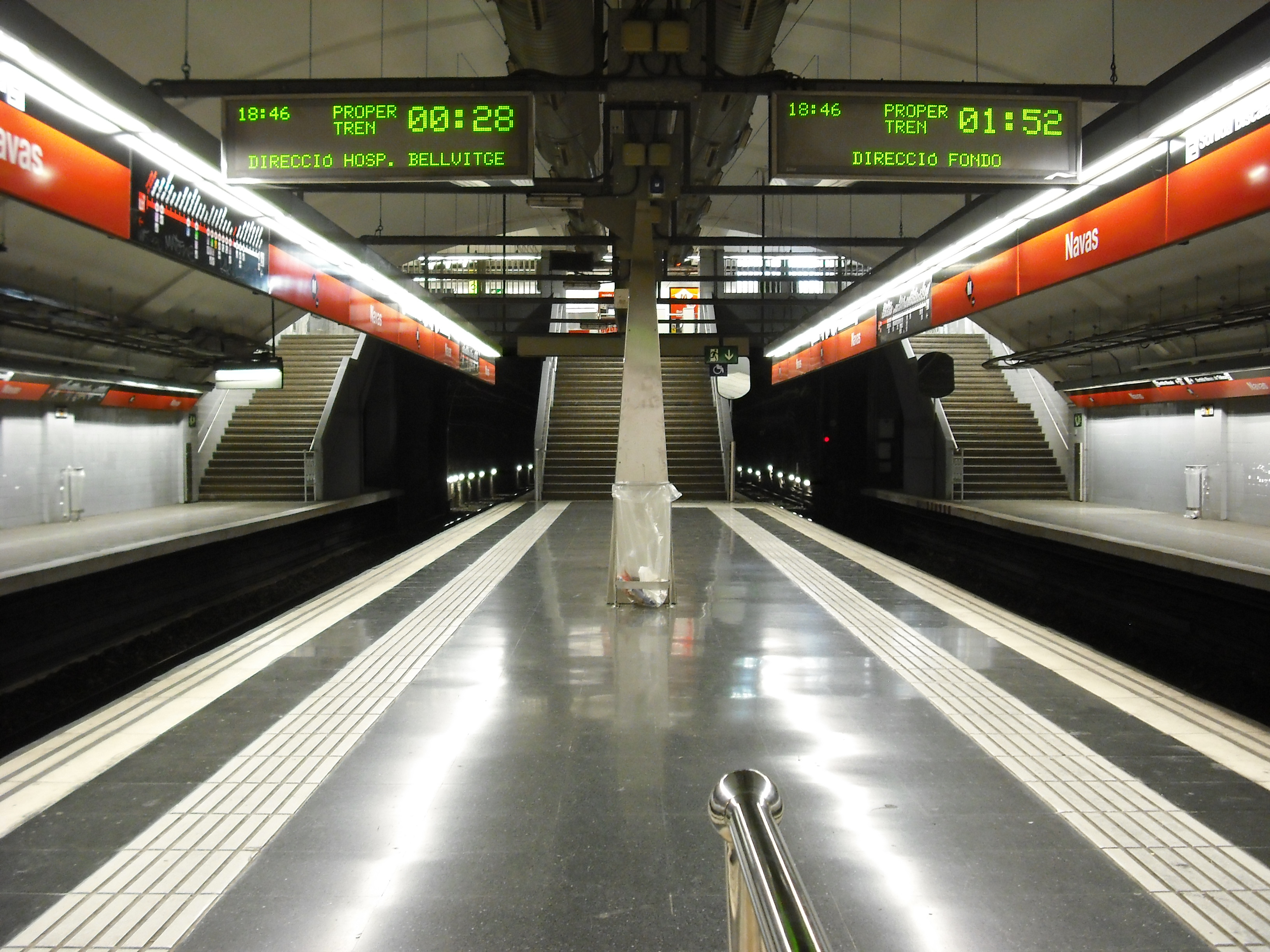
Platforms at Navas metro station.

Navas (Catalan pronunciation: [ˈnaβəs]) is a Barcelona Metro station located in the Navas neighborhood, Sant Andreu district of Barcelona. It is served by L1. It opened in 1953. The name refers to carrer Navas de Tolosa, and the station was originally called Navas de Tolosa until it adopted its current name in 1982.

Like the rest of stations in this section of L1, Navas is located under Avinguda Meridiana, and can be accessed from the street of the same name and from carrer de Biscaia.

== Services ==
Preceding station	Metro	Following station
Clot towards Hospital de Bellvitge	L1	Sagrera towards Fondo

== See also ==
- List of Barcelona Metro stations
- Battle of Las Navas de Tolosa
