= Navas (surname) =

Navas is a Spanish surname. Notable people with the surname include:

- Keylor Navas (born 1986), Famous Costa Rican football player
- Jesus Navas (born 1985), Famous Spanish football player
- George Ernest Navas (born 1956), Former U.S. Naval Officer and Pentagon (9-11) heroic Personality
- Pedro Joaquin Navas (born 1968), Spanish Democrat
- Jose Mario Ruiz Navas (born 1930-2020), Ecuadorian Bishop
- Luisa Euginia Navas (born 1918-2020), Chilean Pharmacist and Botanist
- Romulo Zaragoza de Navas (born 1894), Spanish painter
- Longinos Navas (born 1858-1938), Spanish Entomologist
- Juan de Navas (born 1650-1719),Spanish baroque composer and harpist
