= El Congrés i els Indians =

Neighborhood in Sant Andreu, Barcelona

Coordinates: 41°25′33.17″N 2°10′50.44″E

- Neighborhood of Barcelona
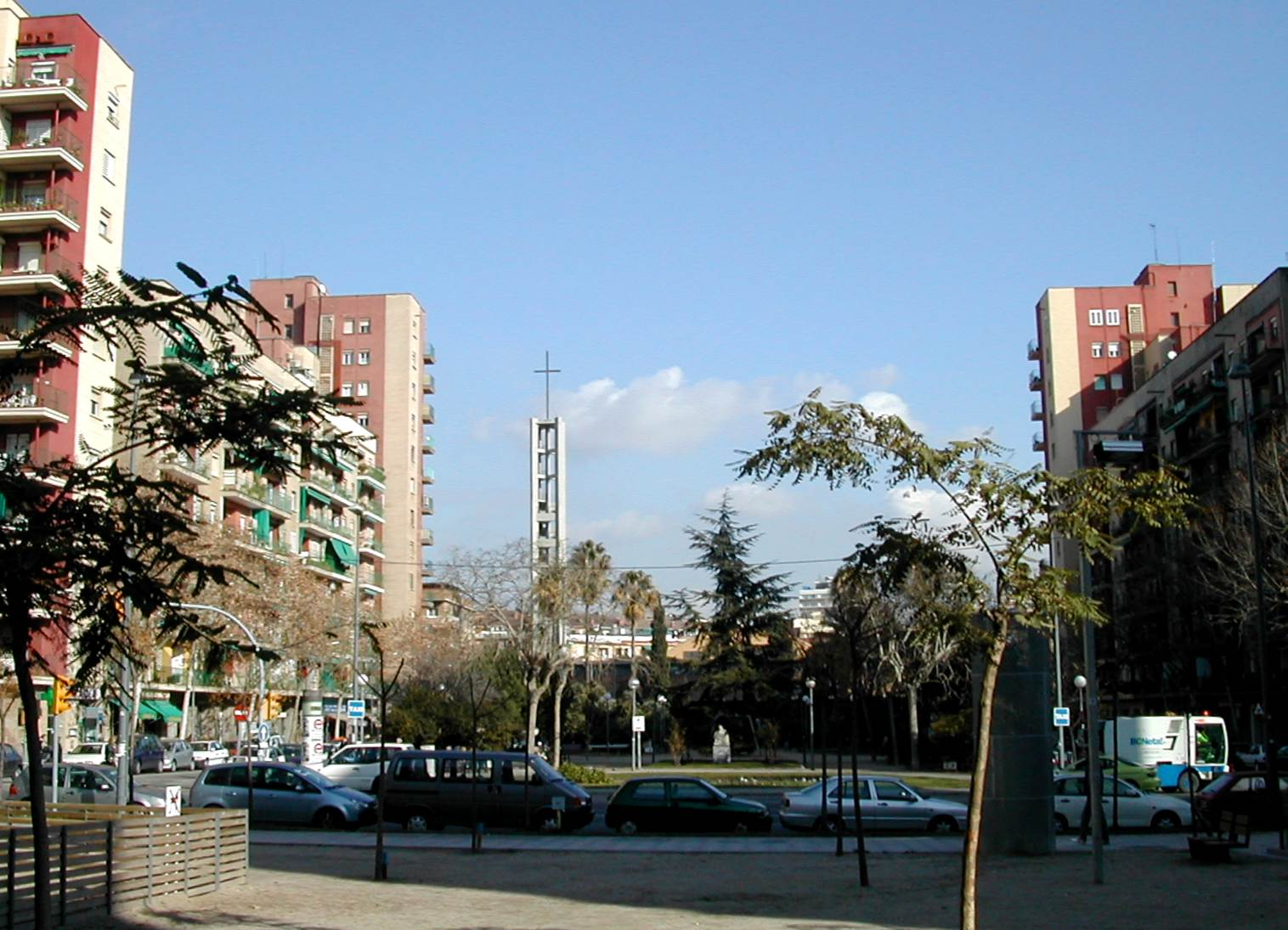
- Plaça del Congrés
- Interactive map of El Congrés i els Indians
- Country: Spain
- Autonomous community: Catalonia
- Province: Barcelona
- Comarca: Barcelonès
- Municipality: Barcelona
- District: Sant Andreu

Area
  - Total: 0.407 km^{2} (0.157 sq mi)

Population
  - Total: 14,051
  - Density: 34,500/km^{2} (89,400/sq mi)

El Congrés i els Indians (Catalan pronunciation: [əl kuŋˈɡɾez j əlz indiˈans]) is a neighborhood in the Sant Andreu district of Barcelona, Catalonia, Spain.
