= Fabra i Puig railway station =

Railway station in Barcelona, Spain

Coordinates: 41.4309°N 2.1831°E

Fabra i Puig
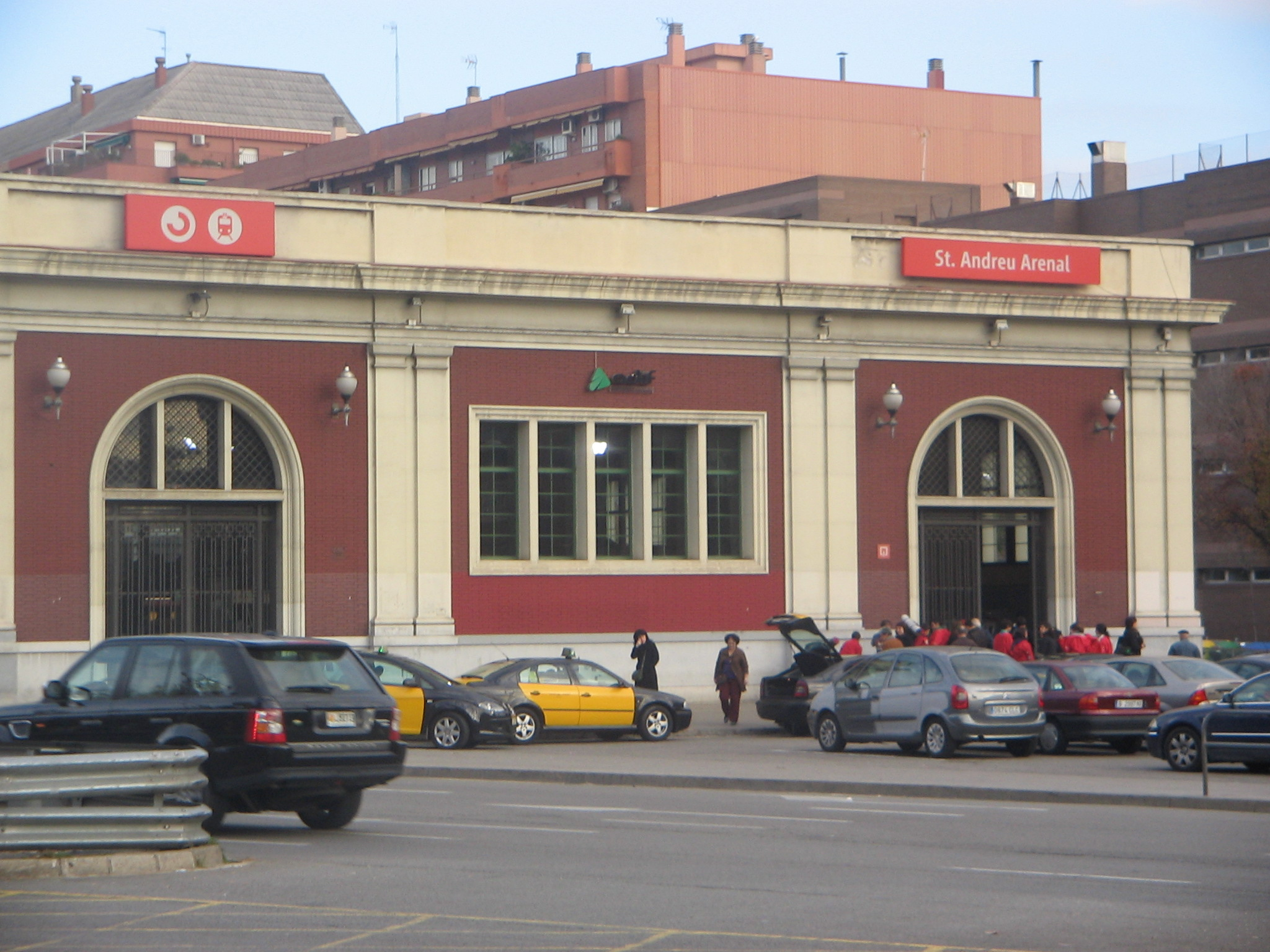
- View of the entrance of the station

General information
- Location: Avinguda Meridiana & Avinguda de Rio de Janeiro; 08907 Barcelona; Catalonia; Spain
- System: Rodalies de Catalunya commuter and regional rail station
- Owner: Adif
- Operator: Renfe Operadora
- Line: Lleida–Manresa–Barcelona (PK 178.1)
- Platforms: 2 island platforms
- Tracks: 4
- Connections: Barcelona Metro line 1 at Fabra i Puig station; Urban buses

Construction
- Structure type: Underground
- Parking: A parking lot is located at each side of the station.

Other information
- Fare zone: 1 (ATM Àrea de Barcelona and Rodalies de Catalunya's Barcelona commuter rail service)

Services
Preceding station	Rodalies de Catalunya	Following station
Barcelona La Sagrera-Meridiana towards L'Hospitalet de Llobregat	R3	Barcelona Torre del Baró towards Latour-de-Carol-Enveitg
Barcelona La Sagrera-Meridiana towards Sant Vicenç de Calders	R4	Barcelona Torre del Baró towards Manresa
Terminus	R7	Barcelona Torre del Baró towards Cerdanyola Universitat
Barcelona La Sagrera-Meridiana towards L'Hospitalet de Llobregat	R12	Barcelona Torre del Baró towards Lleida Pirineus
Location

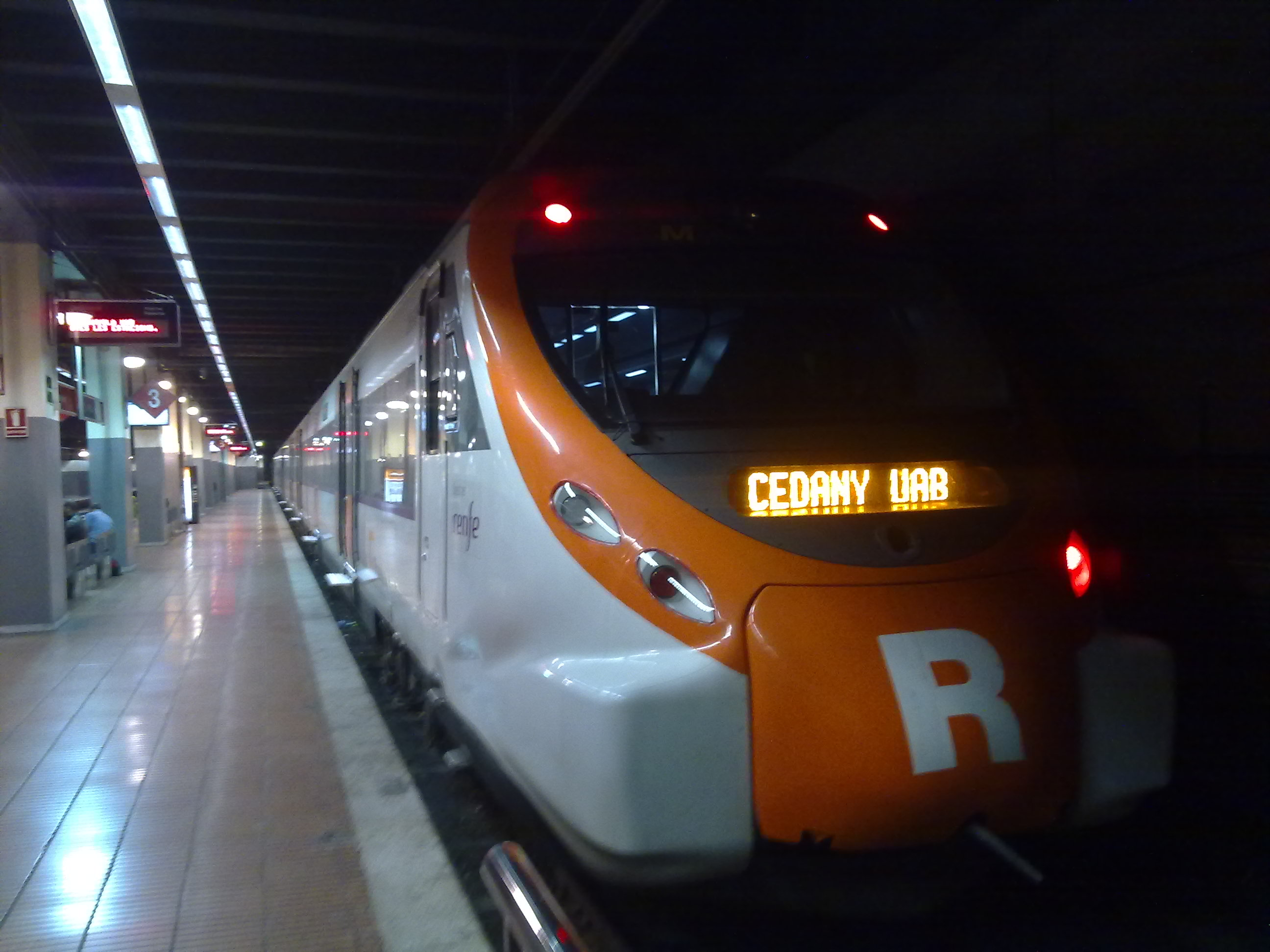
Sant Andreu Arenal station platforms

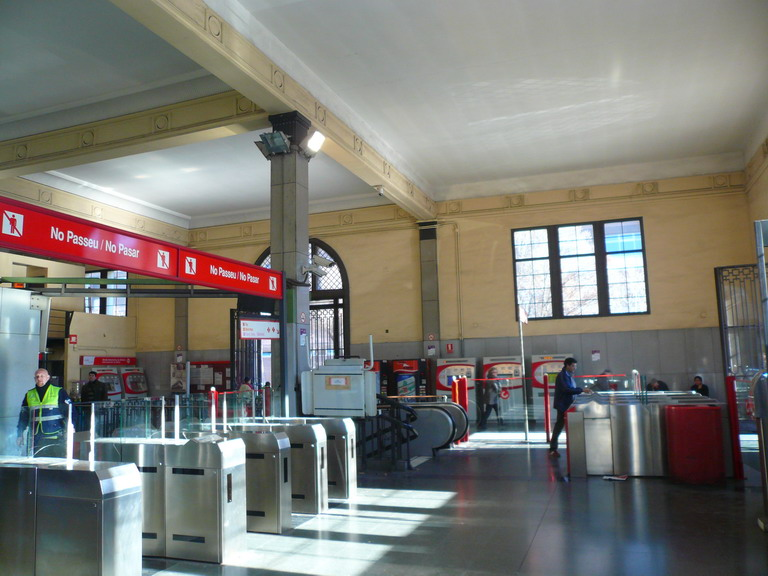
Sant Andreu Arenal

Fabra i Puig (Catalan pronunciation: [ˈfaβɾəj ˈputʃ]) is a Rodalies de Catalunya station in the Barcelona district of Sant Andreu. It is served by Barcelona commuter rail lines R3, R4 and R7 as well as regional line R12. Passengers can also change here with Barcelona's Metro Line L1 station of Fabra i Puig and the Sant Andreu bus terminal. It is located where Avinguda Meridiana and Avinguda de Rio de Janeiro meet, by Rambla de Fabra i Puig.

The station was previously known as Sant Andreu Arenal (and before that San Andrés Norte), changing to the current name in order to simplify the network and avoid cases where two stations with interchange had different names. The change was announced on 9 May 2022 and took effect from 17 July 2023.

== Metro ==
- Fabra i Puig (L1)

== See also ==
- List of Rodalies Barcelona railway stations
- Sant Andreu railway station
