= La Sagrera-Meridiana station =

Metro and commuter rail interchange complex in Barcelona, Spain

La Sagrera-Meridiana
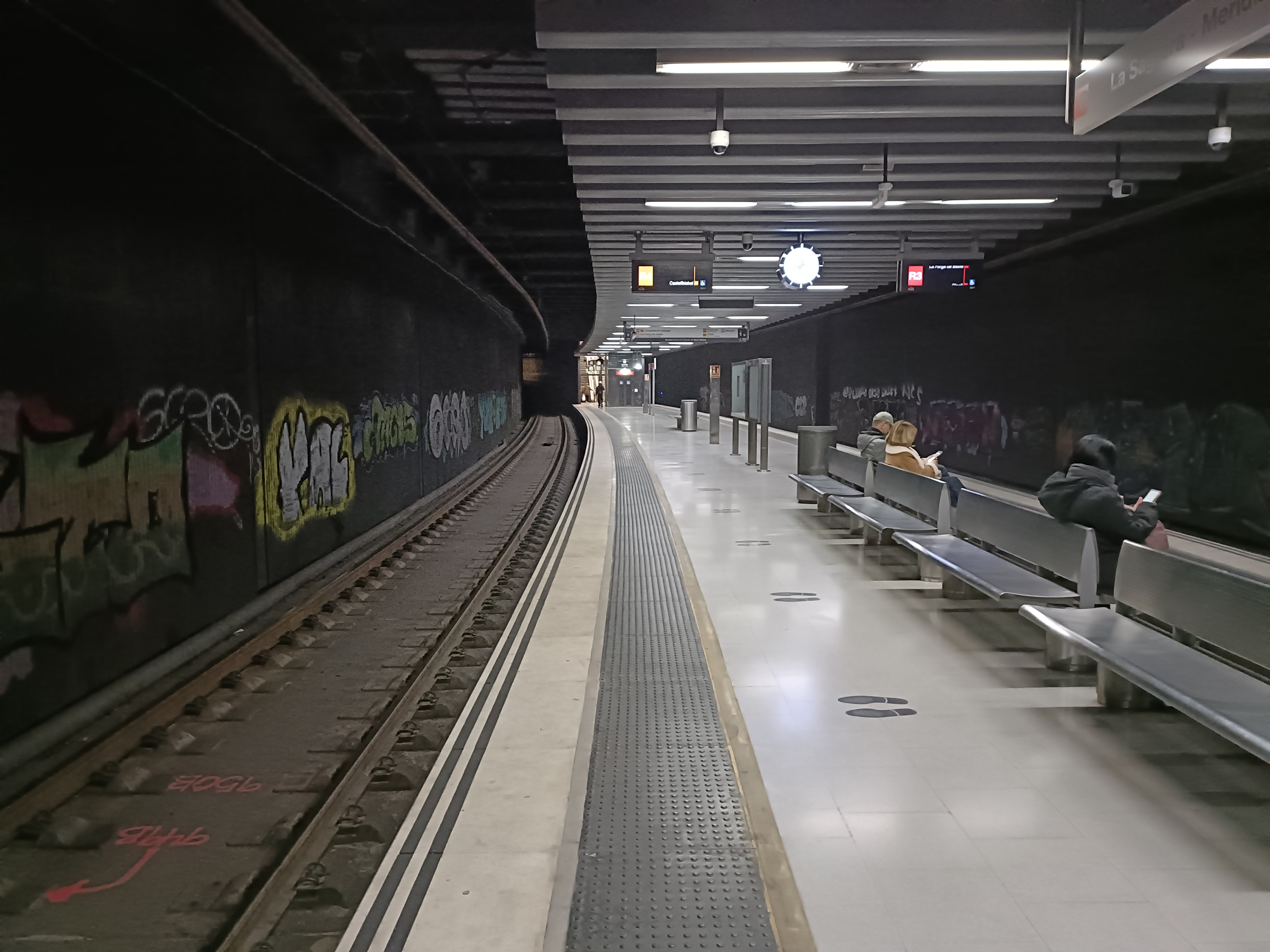
- The Rodalies de Catalunya platform

General information
- Location: Avinguda Meridiana; 08027 Barcelona; Catalonia; Spain
- Coordinates: 41°25′22.56″N 2°11′12.89″E
- System: Rodalies de Catalunya commuter and regional rail station Barcelona Metro rapid transit station complex
- Owner: Adif (Rodalies de Catalunya); Government of Catalonia (Barcelona Metro)
- Operator: Renfe Operadora (Rodalies de Catalunya); Transports Metropolitans de Barcelona (TMB; Barcelona Metro)
- Lines: Lleida–Manresa–Barcelona (PK 179.2); Barcelona Metro line 1; Barcelona Metro line 5; Barcelona Metro line 9 / 10
- Platforms: : 1 island platform; : 1 island platform; : 1 island platform; : 1 split platform
- Tracks: : 2; : 2; : 2; : 2
- Connections: Urban and interurban buses

Construction
- Structure type: Underground

Other information
- Station code: : 79004; : 133; : 526; : 930
- Fare zone: 1 (ATM Àrea de Barcelona and Rodalies de Catalunya's Barcelona commuter rail service)

History
- Opened: : 27 January 1954; : 27 July 1957; : 26 June 2010; : 20 February 2011

Services
| Preceding station | Rodalies de Catalunya | Following station |
|---|---|---|
| Barcelona Arc de Triomf towards L'Hospitalet de Llobregat | R3 | Fabra i Puig towards Latour-de-Carol-Enveitg |
| Barcelona Arc de Triomf towards Sant Vicenç de Calders | R4 | Fabra i Puig towards Manresa |
| Barcelona Arc de Triomf towards L'Hospitalet de Llobregat | R12 | Fabra i Puig towards Lleida Pirineus |
| Preceding station | Metro | Following station |
| Navas towards Hospital de Bellvitge | L1 | Fabra i Puig towards Fondo |
| Camp de l'Arpa towards Cornellà Centre | L5 | Congrés towards Vall d'Hebron |
| Terminus | L9 Nord | Onze de Setembre towards Can Zam |
| Terminus | L10 Nord | Onze de Setembre towards Gorg |
Projected
| Terminus | L4 | Sagrera | TAV towards Trinitat Nova |
| Plaça de Maragall towards Airport T1 | L9 | Sagrera | TAV towards Can Zam |
| Plaça de Maragall towards Pratenc | L10 | Sagrera | TAV towards Gorg |
Location
- Location within Barcelona

La Sagrera-Meridiana (Catalan pronunciation: [lə səˈɣɾeɾə]), simply known as La Sagrera, is an interchange complex underneath Avinguda Meridiana, in the Barcelona district of Sant Andreu, in Catalonia, Spain. It consists of a Rodalies de Catalunya station and three Barcelona Metro stations. The Rodalies de Catalunya station is located in the Meridiana Tunnel on the Lleida to Barcelona via Manresa railway, between Fabra i Puig (previously Sant Andreu Arenal) and Arc de Triomf, and is operated by Renfe Operadora. It is served by Barcelona's commuter rail service lines R3 and R4, as well as regional rail line R12. The Barcelona Metro stations are on lines 1 (L1) and 5 (L5), as well as the northern section of line 9/10 (L9 Nord/L10), and are operated by Transports Metropolitans de Barcelona (TMB). On the L1, the station is between Navas and Fabra i Puig, on the L5 between Camp de l'Arpa and Congrés, and on the L9/L10 between Plaça Maragall (future) and Sagrera - TAV (under construction). The station is also projected to become the terminus of the L4 once the extension from La Pau opens. A number of interurban bus services stop near the station.

== Station layout ==
=== Rodalies de Catalunya ===
The Rodalies de Catalunya railway station was opened on February 16, 2011 and entered in service in February 20, 2011. It is located under Avinguda Meridiana, between Hondures and Martí Molins streets. It has one access at each side of the station, one of them used by TMB too. The upper level has a hall equipped with ticket vending machines and a left-luggage office. On the lower level there are two platforms where the trains run.

=== Barcelona Metro ===
- Barcelona Metro line 1 station was opened in 1954 with the opening of the line between Navas and this station. The station is located under Avinguda Meridiana, between Hondures and Garcilaso streets. The upper level of the station has two halls, one of them connected to Barcelona Metro line 5 and Rodalies de Catalunya railway station. They are equipped with ticket vending machines and a TMB Information Center.
- Barcelona Metro line 5 station was opened in 1959 with the opening of the line between Vilapicina and this station. The station is located under Avinguda Meridiana, between Felip II and Garcilaso streets. It has two halls equipped with ticket vending machines and connected to L1 and L9/L10 metro station.
- Barcelona Metro line 9/10 station was opened in June 2010 with the opening of the line between Bon Pastor and this station. Temporarily L9 and L10 use what will be the future L4 tunnel, when this line will arrive at the station. The station is located under the intersection of Avinguda Meridiana and Felip II street. It is divided in three levels: the upper hall, the upper platform and lower platform. The upper hall is used together with line 5 and is equipped with ticket vending machines and a TMB Control Center. On the upper platform run all the trains that stop in the station because the lower platform is currently closed.

== Gallery ==
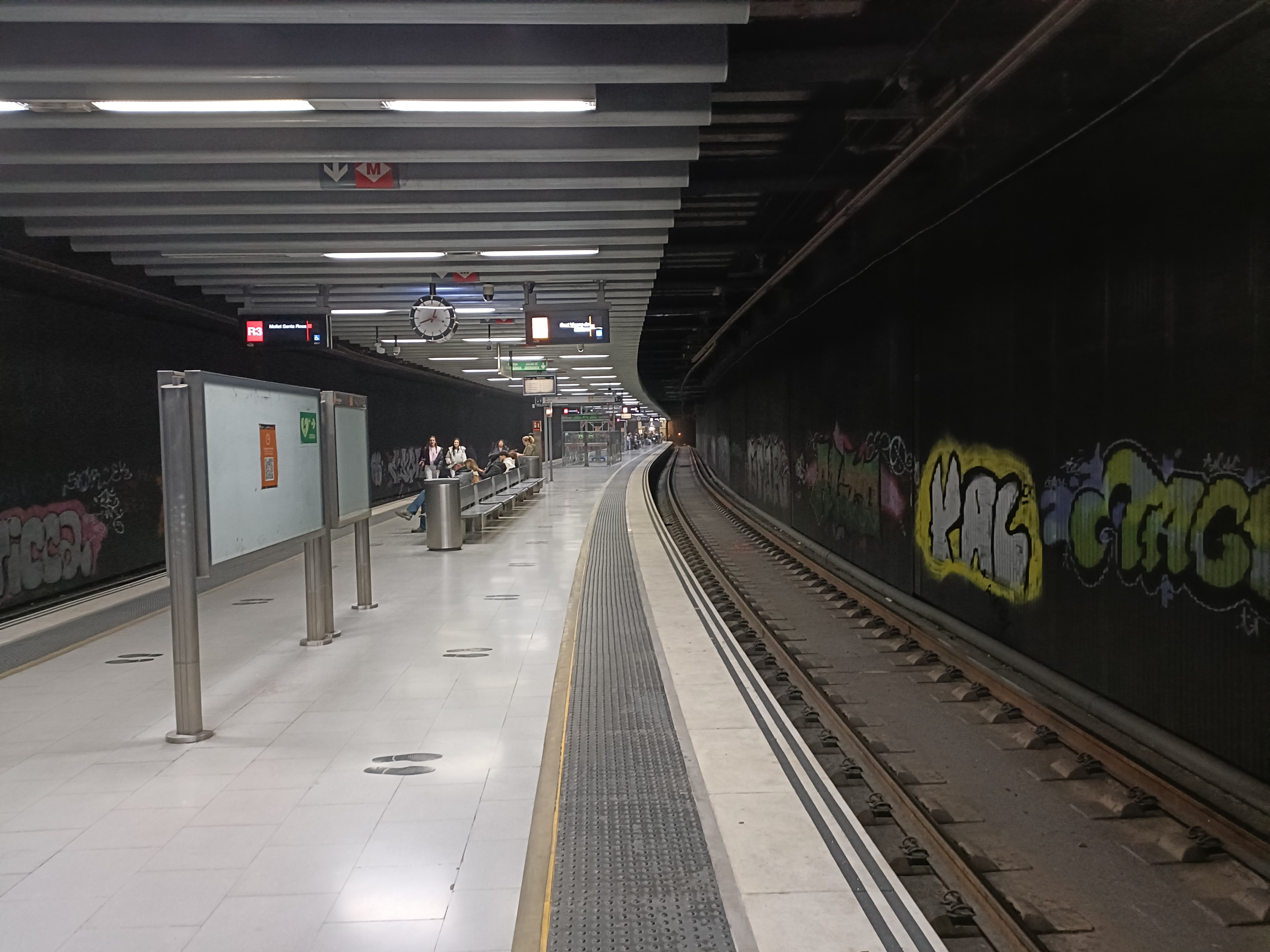
Another view of the Rodalies de Catalunya platform

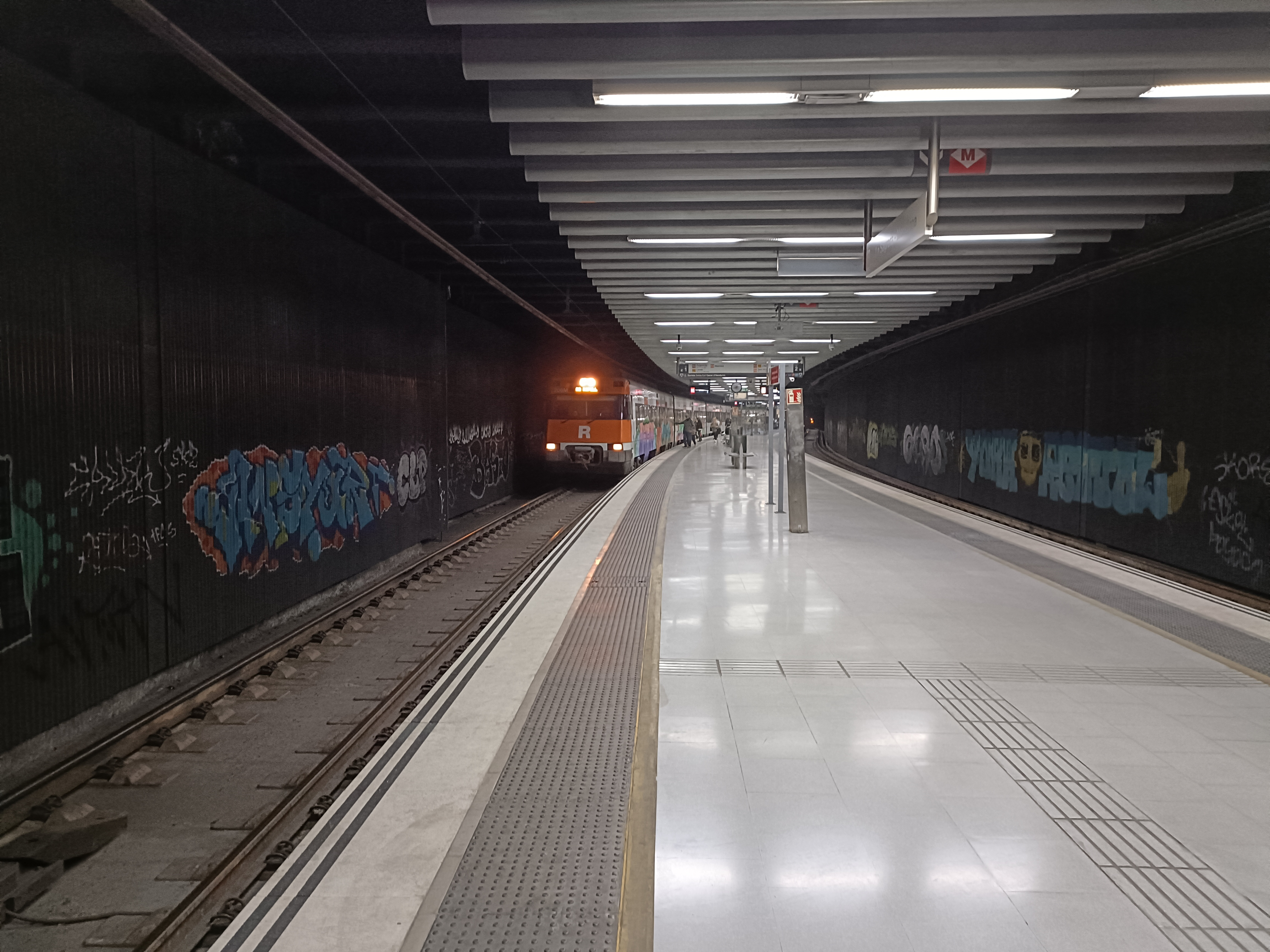
A Class 447 EMU at the Rodalies de Catalunya platform

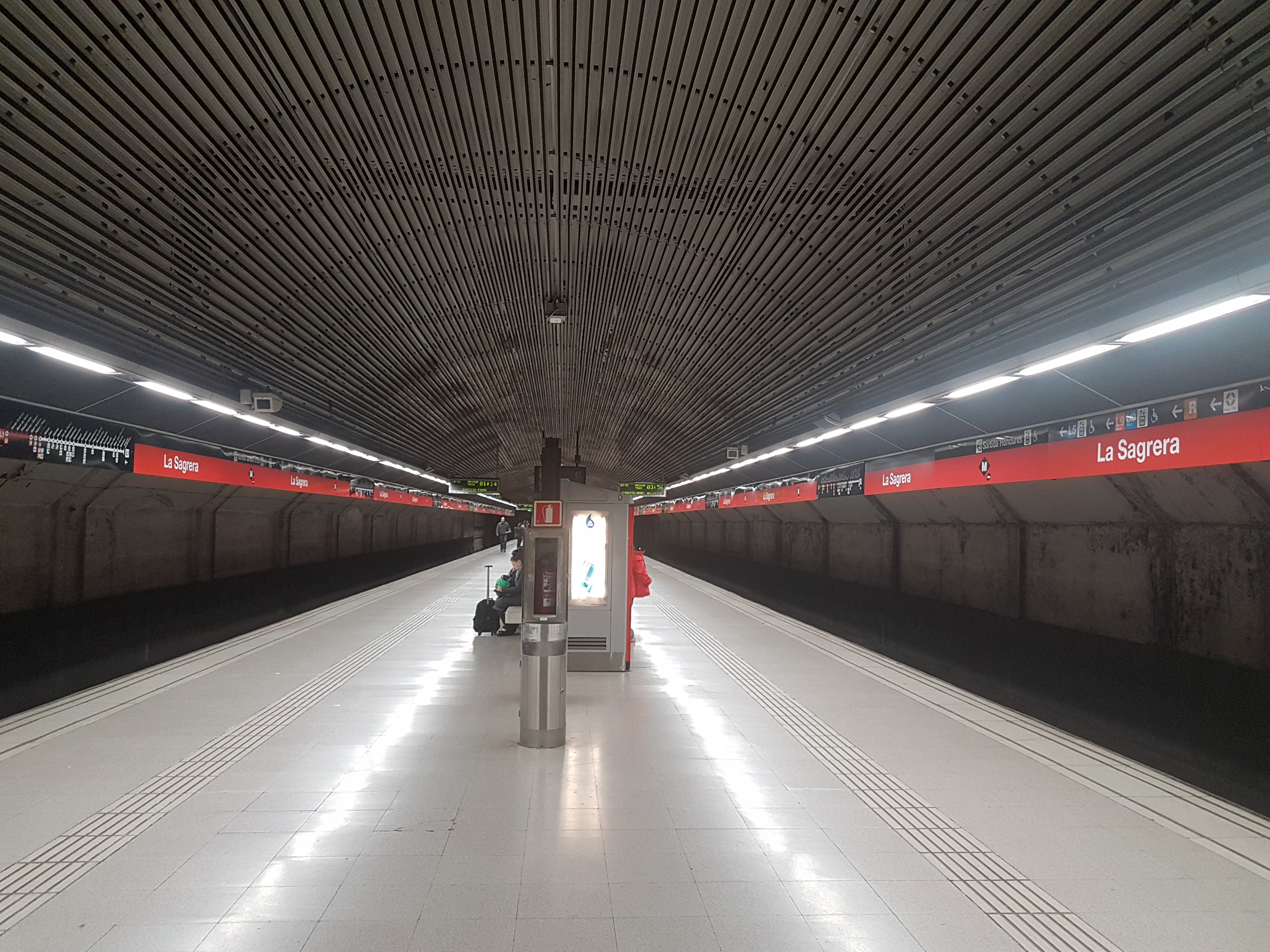
The platform of Line 1

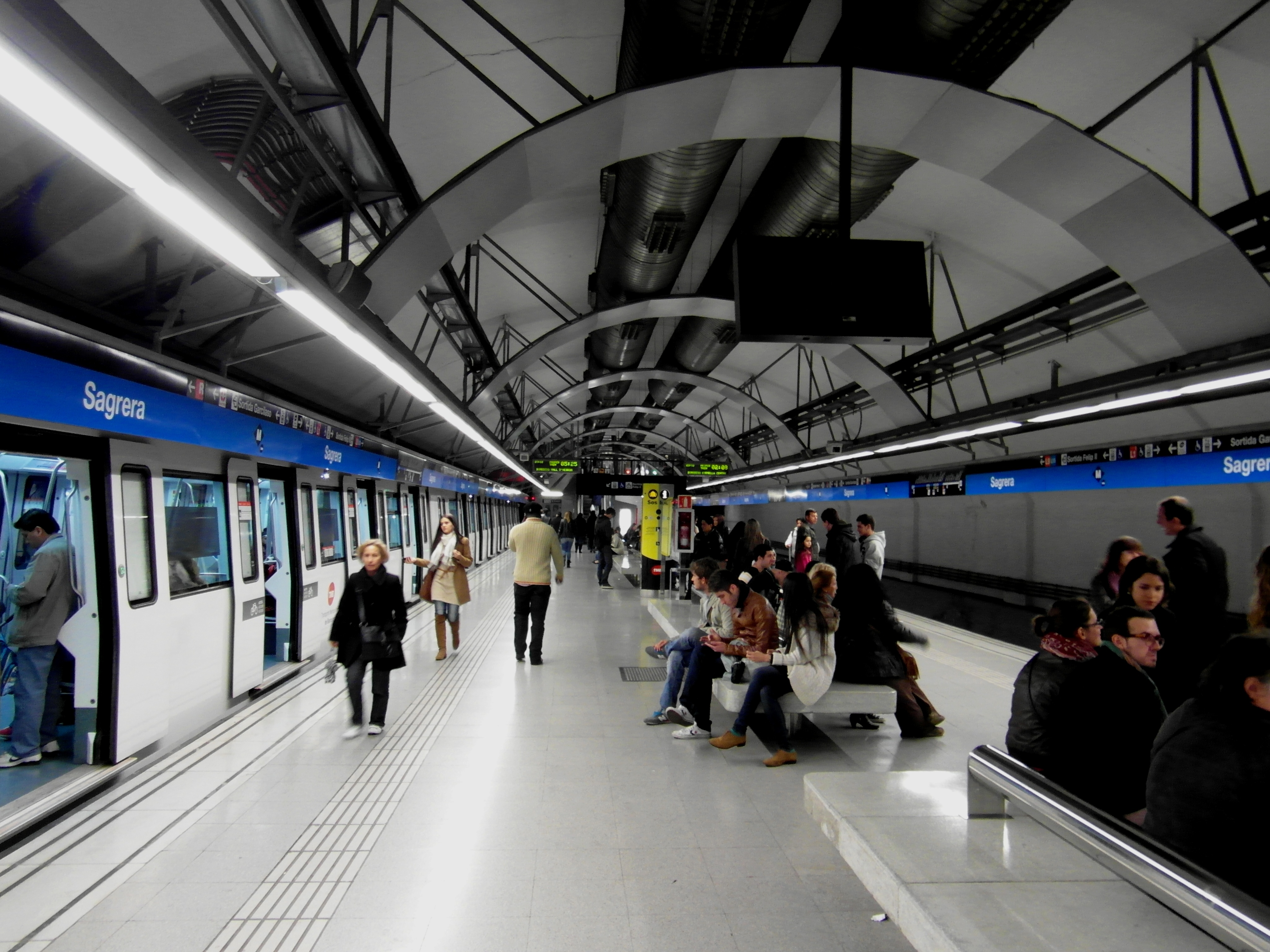
The platform of Line 5

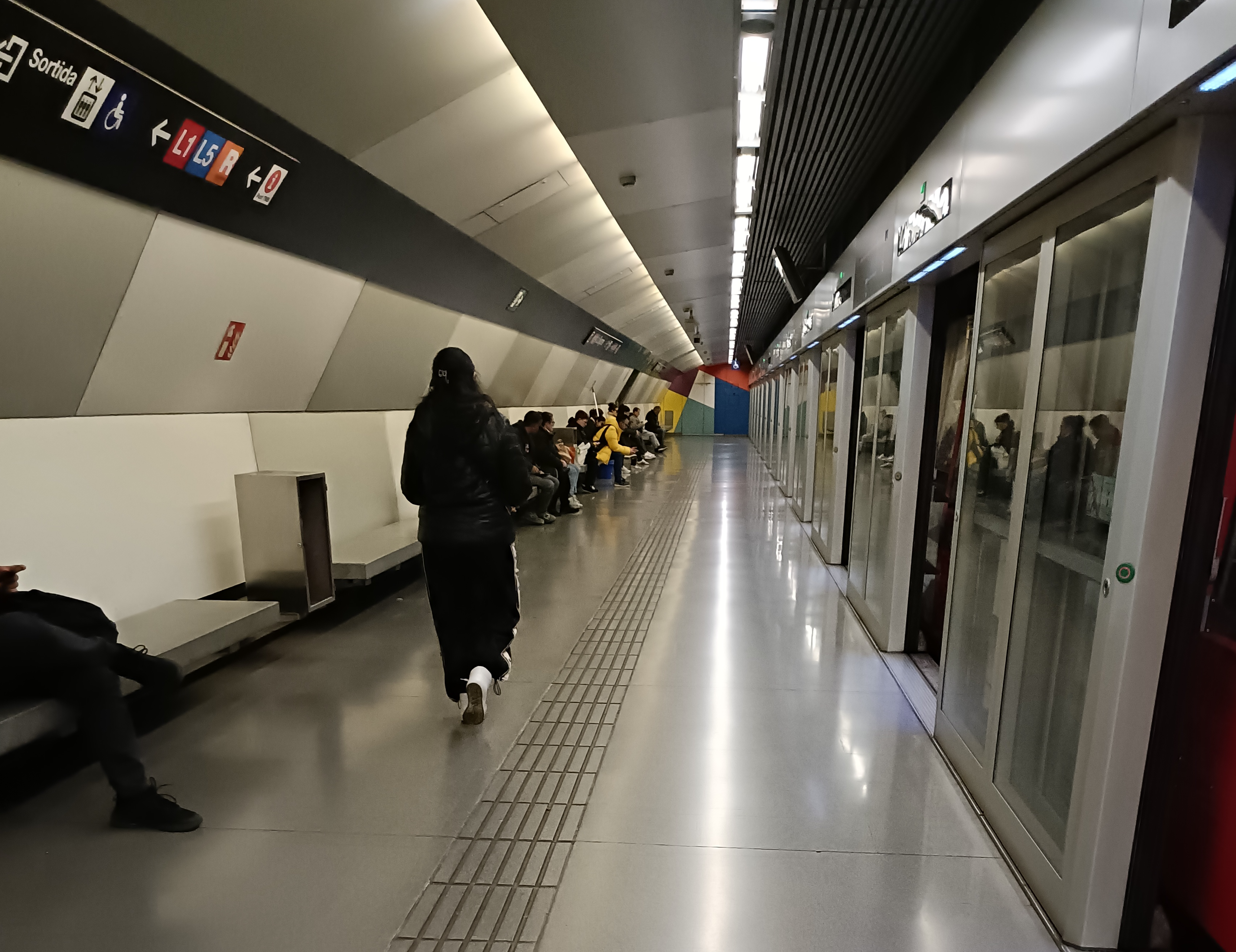
The platform shared by Line 9 and Line 10
