= Fabra i Puig station (Barcelona Metro) =

Metro station in Barcelona, Spain

Coordinates: 41.431°N 2.183°E

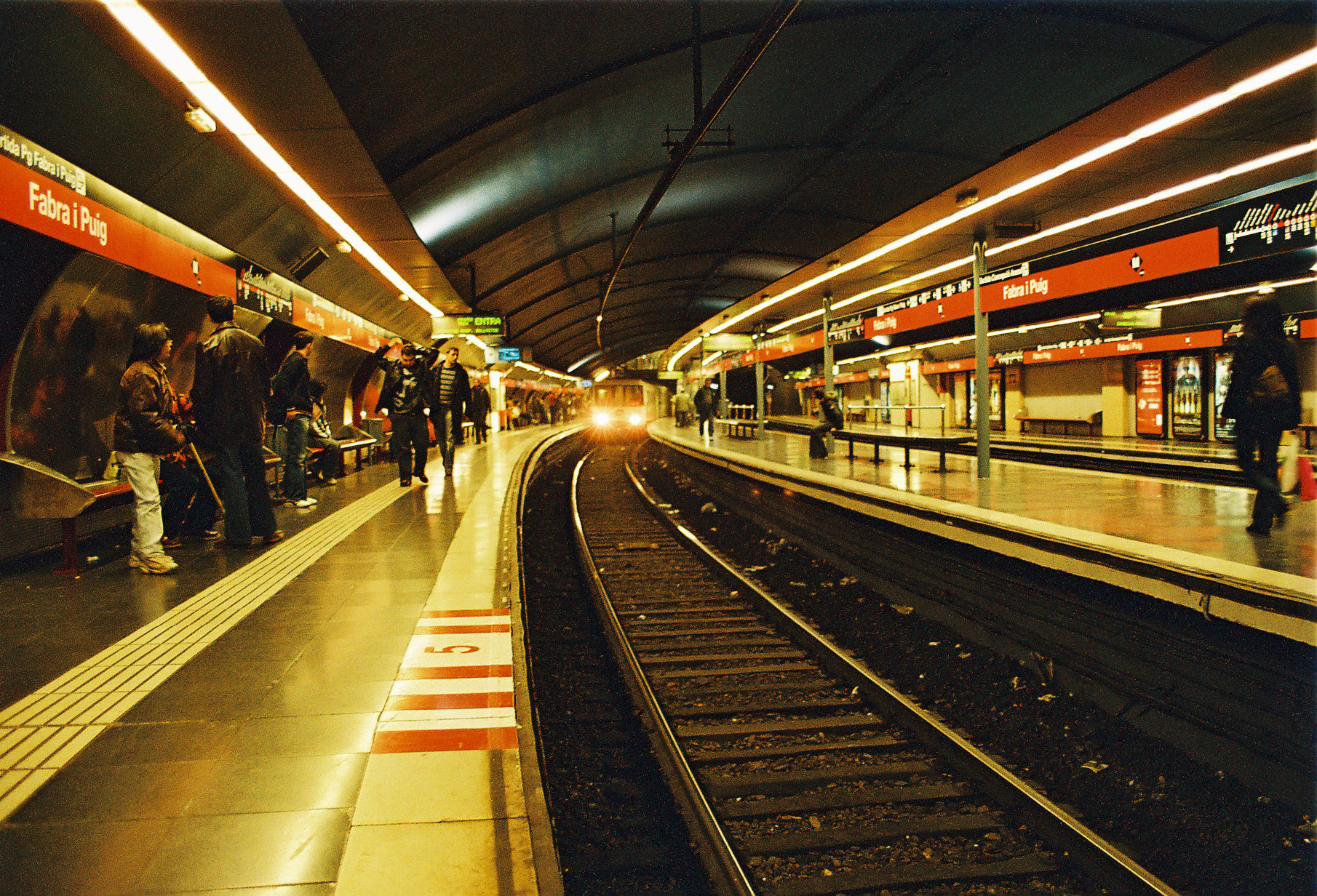
The platforms at Fabra i Puig

Fabra i Puig (Catalan pronunciation: [ˈfaβɾəj ˈputʃ]) is a Barcelona Metro station, on L1 (red line), located in the Sant Andreu district of Barcelona, below Avinguda Meridiana and between Carrer de Concepció Arenal and Passeig de Fabra i Puig. It opened in 1954, with the extension of the aforementioned line from Sagrera to this station. Passengers can commute here for the Renfe-operated Fabra i Puig railway station. It's named after Passeig de Fabra i Puig, one of the main thoroughfares of the area.

== Services ==
Preceding station	Metro	Following station
Sagrera towards Hospital de Bellvitge	L1	Sant Andreu towards Fondo

== See also ==
- Sant Andreu Arenal railway station
