= Navas, Sant Andreu =

Coordinates: 41°24′56.68″N 2°11′12.84″E

Navas Torrent de la Guineu (proposed)
- Neighborhood of Barcelona
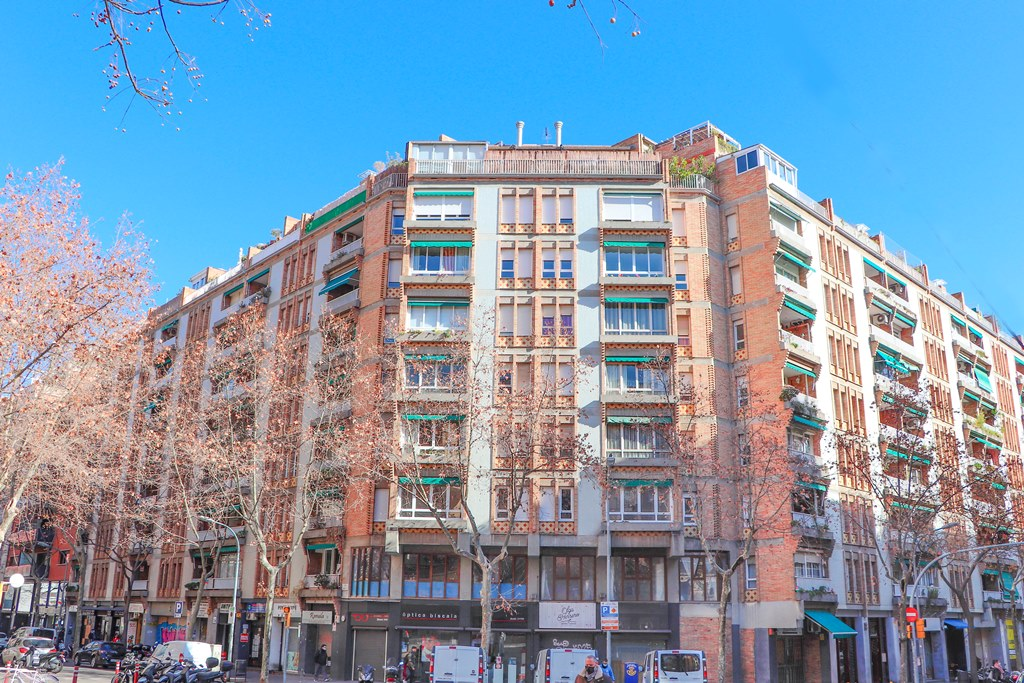
- Building in Torrent de la Guineu
- Interactive map of Navas; Torrent de la Guineu (proposed)
- Country: Spain
- Autonomous community: Catalonia
- Province: Barcelona
- Comarca: Barcelonès
- Municipality: Barcelona
- District: Sant Andreu

Area
  - Total: 0.423 km^{2} (0.163 sq mi)

Population
  - Total: 22,097
  - Density: 52,200/km^{2} (135,000/sq mi)

Navas (Catalan pronunciation: [ˈnaβəs], Spanish: [ˈnaβas]) is a neighborhood in the Sant Andreu district of Barcelona, Catalonia (Spain). The Avinguda Meridiana is spanning the neighborhood. Its population as of 1 January 2016 was 22,100 people on a land area of 0.42 km^{2} (0.16 sq mi). It is served by the Barcelona Metro station Navas (from which the neighborhood take its official name) and by local buses.

The neighborhood is divided internally (unofficially, that is, it is not registered by the city council, but is known among neighbors) by barriers.

1) Ferran Reyes barrier: It is around the Ferran Reyes square. It is the area with the Eixample grid

2) Neighborhood del Fang: This is located near the Torre del Fang (Old farmhouse, currently abandoned), below Meridian Avenue

3) Neighborhood of les Cases del Governador: It is the smallest, since it consists only of the buildings that circumcise the governor's houses (urbanization of cheap houses from the 50s)

In 5 March 2025, the Council of Sant Andreu district approved the proposal to change its name to Torrent de la Guineu (Catalan pronunciation: [tuˈren də lə ɣiˈnɛw]). The decision must be yet ratified by the Barcelona City Council.
