= Art Institute of Chicago =

Art museum in Illinois, United States

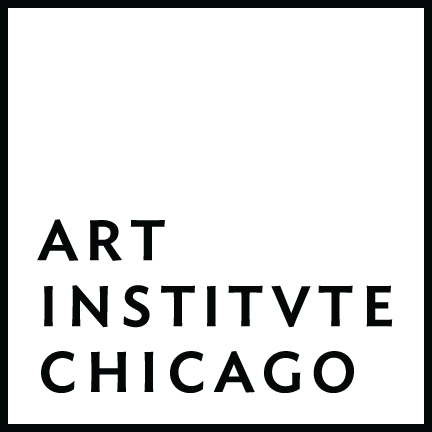

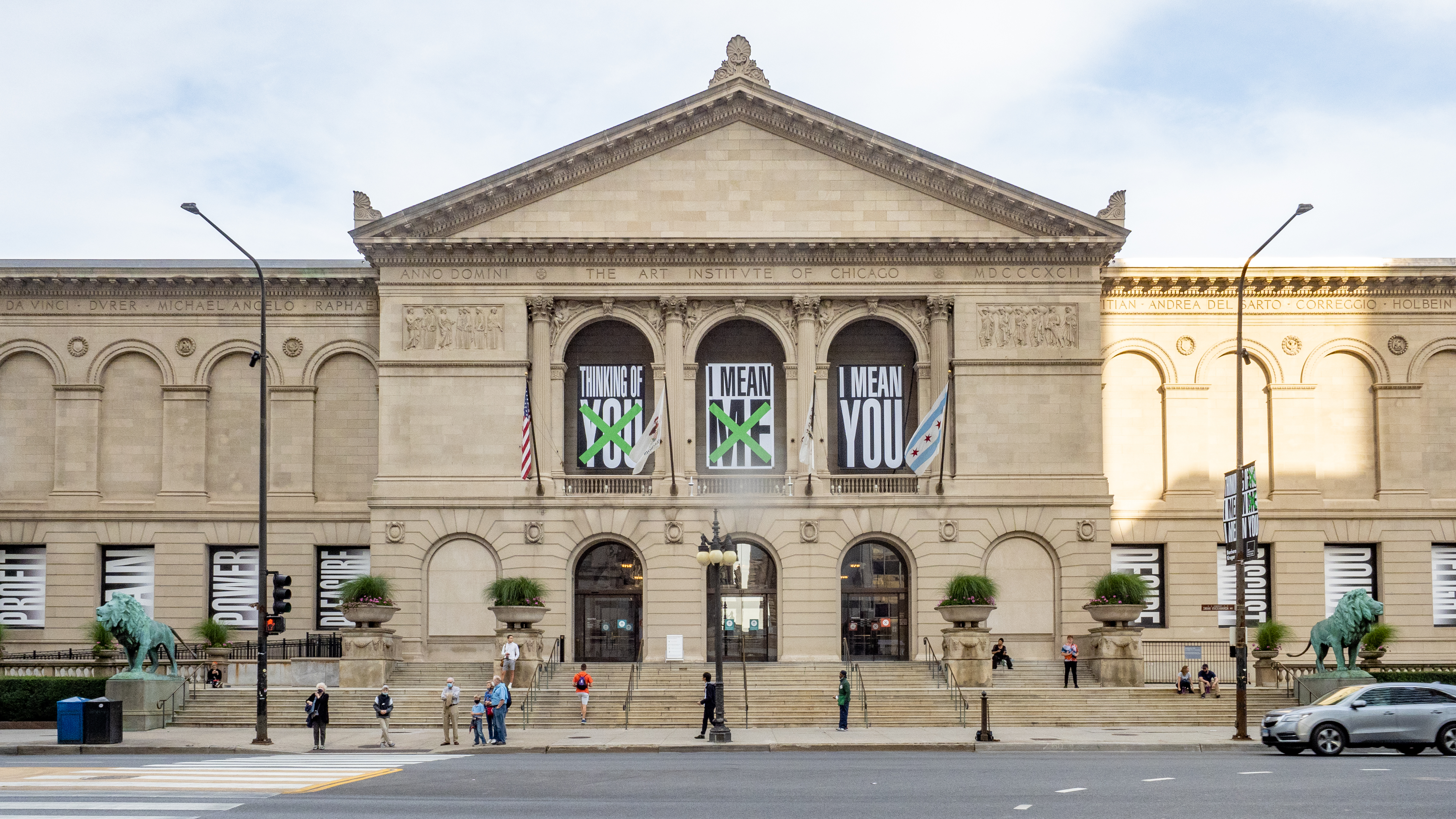
- The Art Institute of Chicago seen from Michigan Avenue
- Interactive fullscreen map
- Established: 1879; in present location since 1893
- Location: 111 South Michigan Avenue; Chicago, Illinois 60603, U.S.
- Coordinates: 41°52′46″N 87°37′26″W
- Collection size: 300,000 works
- Visitors: 1,322,195 (2023)
- Director: James Rondeau
- Public transit access: CTA Bus routes: (6 and 28 line) 'L' and Subway stations: Green Brown Orange Pink Purple at Adams/Wabash; Red at Monroe/State; Blue at Monroe/Dearborn; Metra and South Shore Line: ME at Van Buren Street
- Website: artic.edu

The Art Institute of Chicago is a private, nonprofit art museum in Grant Park, Chicago, Illinois, United States.

Founded in 1879, it is one of the oldest and largest art museums in the United States. The museum is based in the Art Institute of Chicago Building in Chicago's Grant Park. Its collection, stewarded by 11 curatorial departments, includes works such as Georges Seurat's A Sunday on La Grande Jatte, Pablo Picasso's The Old Guitarist, Edward Hopper's Nighthawks, and Grant Wood's American Gothic. Its permanent collection of nearly 300,000 works of art is augmented by more than 30 special exhibitions mounted yearly that present curatorial and scientific research. The land of the institute is publicly owned by the city of Chicago and administered by the Chicago Park District.

As a research institution, the Art Institute also has a conservation and conservation science department, five conservation laboratories, and Ryerson and Burnham Libraries, one of the nation's largest art history and architecture libraries.

The museum's building was constructed for the 1893 World's Columbian Exposition and, due to the growth of the collection, several additions have occurred since. The Modern Wing, designed by Renzo Piano, is the most recent expansion, and when it opened in 2009 it increased the museum's footprint to nearly one million square feet. This made it the second largest art museum in the United States, after the Metropolitan Museum of Art in New York City.

The School of the Art Institute of Chicago is legally part of the Art Institute of Chicago, making it one of the few remaining unified arts institutions in the United States.

== History ==
=== 19th century ===
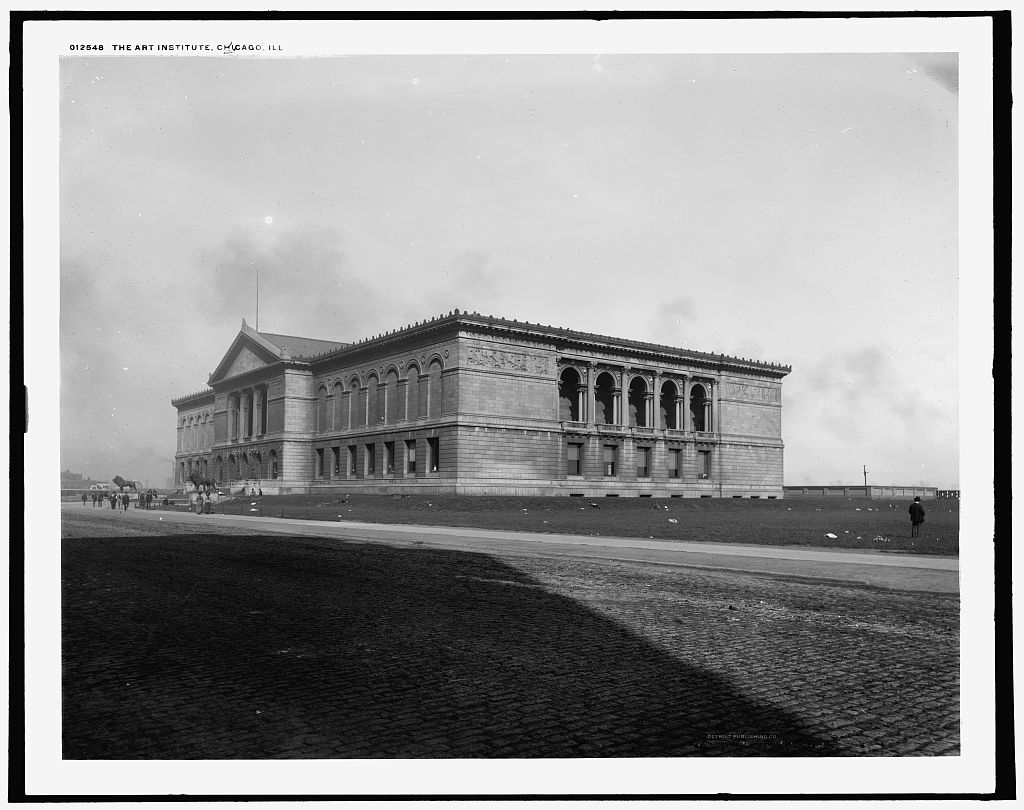
What is believed to be the oldest image of the Art Institute, taken in 1890, and published in the Detroit Catalogue J. in 1901

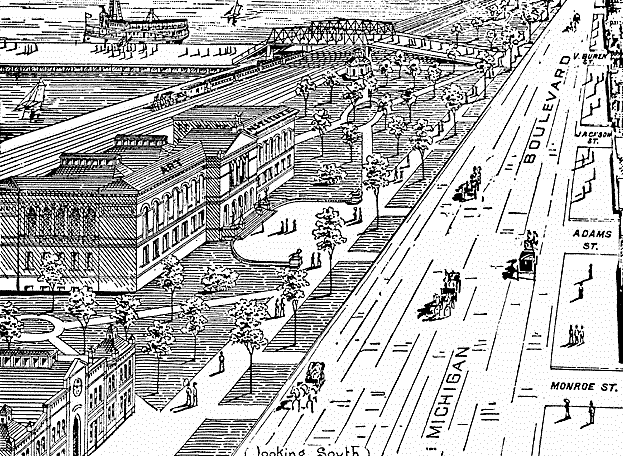
An 1893 sketch of the new Art Institute of Chicago showing most of today's Grant Park still submerged under Lake Michigan with the railroad tracks running along the shoreline behind the museum

In 1866, a group of 35 artists founded the Chicago Academy of Design in a studio on Dearborn Street, with the intent to run a free school with its own art gallery. The organization was modeled after European art academies, such as the Royal Academy, with Academicians and Associate Academicians. The academy's charter was granted in March 1867.

Classes started in 1868, meeting every day at a cost of $10 per month. The academy's success enabled it to build a new home for the school, a five-story stone building on 66 West Adams Street, which opened on November 22, 1870.

When the Great Chicago Fire destroyed the building in 1871, the academy was thrown into debt. Attempts to continue despite the loss by using rented facilities failed. By 1878, the academy was $10,000 in debt. Members tried to rescue the ailing institution by making deals with local businessmen, before some finally abandoned it in 1879 to found a new organization, named the Chicago Academy of Fine Arts. When the Chicago Academy of Design went bankrupt the same year, the new Chicago Academy of Fine Arts bought its assets at auction.

In 1882, the Chicago Academy of Fine Arts changed its name to the current Art Institute of Chicago and elected as its first president the banker and philanthropist Charles L. Hutchinson, who "is arguably the single most important individual to have shaped the direction and fortunes of the Art Institute of Chicago". Hutchinson was a director of many prominent Chicago organizations, including the University of Chicago, and would transform the Art Institute into a world-class museum during his presidency, which he held until his death in 1924. Also in 1882, the organization purchased a lot on the southwest corner of Michigan Avenue and Van Buren Street for $45,000. The existing commercial building on that property was used for the organization's headquarters, and a new addition was constructed behind it to provide gallery space and to house the school's facilities. By January 1885 the trustees recognized the need to provide additional space for the organization's growing collection, and to this end purchased the vacant lot directly south on Michigan Avenue. The commercial building was demolished, and the noted architect John Wellborn Root was hired by Hutchinson to design a building that would create an "impressive presence" on Michigan Avenue, and these facilities opened to great fanfare in 1887.

With the announcement of the World's Columbian Exposition to be held in 1892–93, the Art Institute pressed for a building on the lakefront to be constructed for the fair, but to be used by the institute afterwards. The city agreed, and the building was completed in time for the second year of the fair. Construction costs were met by selling the Michigan/Van Buren property. On October 31, 1893, the institute moved into the new building. For the opening reception on December 8, 1893, Theodore Thomas and the Chicago Symphony Orchestra performed.

=== 20th century ===
From the early 1900s to the 1960s the school offered, with the Logan Family (members of the board), the Logan Medal of the Arts, an award which became one of the most distinguished awards presented to artists in the U.S. Between 1959 and 1970, the institute was a key site in the movement to gain mainstream gallery acceptance for art photography and documentary photography, under curator Hugh Edwards and his assistants.

As director of the museum starting in the early 1980s, James N. Wood conducted a major expansion of its collection and oversaw a major renovation and expansion project for its facilities. As "one of the most respected museum leaders in the country", as described by The New York Times, Wood created major exhibitions of works by Paul Gauguin, Claude Monet, and Vincent van Gogh that set records for attendance at the museum. He retired from the museum in 2004.

=== 21st century ===
The institute began construction of "The Modern Wing", an addition situated on the southwest corner of Columbus and Monroe in the early 21st century. The project, designed by Pritzker Prize–winning architect Renzo Piano, was completed and officially opened to the public on May 16, 2009. The 264,000-square-foot (24,500 m^{2}) building addition made the Art Institute the second-largest art museum in the United States. The building houses the museum's world-renowned collections of 20th and 21st century art, specifically modern European painting and sculpture, contemporary art, architecture and design, and photography. In its inaugural survey in 2014, travel review website and forum, Tripadvisor, reviewed millions of travelers' surveys and named the Art Institute the world's best museum.

The museum received perhaps the largest gift of art in its history in 2015. Collectors Stefan Edlis and Gael Neeson donated a "collection [that] is among the world's greatest groups of postwar Pop art ever assembled". The donation includes works by Andy Warhol, Jasper Johns, Cy Twombly, Jeff Koons, Charles Ray, Richard Prince, Cindy Sherman, Roy Lichtenstein and Gerhard Richter. The museum agreed to keep the donated work on display for at least 50 years. In June 2018, the museum received a $50 million donation, the largest single announced unrestricted monetary donation in its history.

In September 2024, the Art Institute of Chicago announced a $75 million donation from collectors Aaron I. Fleischman and Lin Lougheed, marking the largest naming gift in the museum's history. This contribution is designated for the development of The Aaron I. Fleischman and Lin Lougheed Building, intended to showcase the museum's extensive collection of late 19th-century, modern, and contemporary art.

In February 2025, the Art Institute of Chicago received a significant donation from collectors Jeffrey and Carol Horvitz, comprising nearly 2,000 drawings, 200 paintings, and 50 sculptures by renowned French artists such as Jacques-Louis David and François Boucher. This collection, amassed over four decades, spans the 16th to 19th centuries, with a focus on Neoclassicism.

== Collection ==
The collection of the Art Institute of Chicago encompasses more than 5,000 years of human expression from cultures around the world and contains more than 300,000 works of art in 11 curatorial departments, ranging from early Japanese prints to the art of the Byzantine Empire to contemporary American art. It is principally known for one of the United States' finest collections of paintings produced in Western culture.

=== African Art and Indian Art of the Americas ===
The Art Institute's African Art and Indian Art of the Americas collections are on display across two galleries in the south end of the Michigan Avenue building. The African collection includes more than 400 works that span the continent, highlighting ceramics, garments, masks, and jewelry.

The Amerindian collection includes Native North American art and Mesoamerican and Andean works. From pottery to textiles, the collection brings together a wide array of objects that seek to illustrate the thematic and aesthetic focuses of art spanning the Americas.

=== American art ===
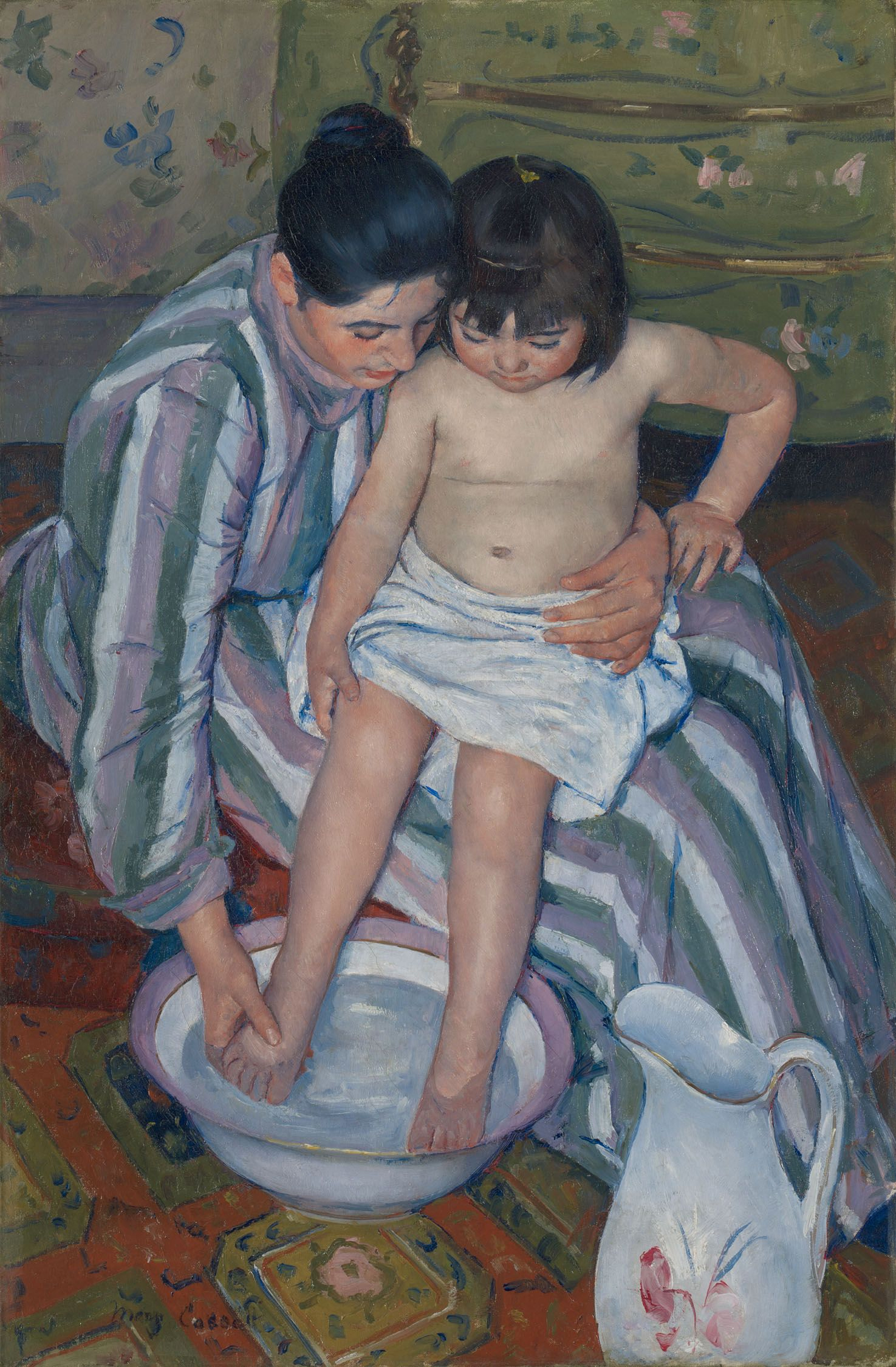
Mary Cassatt's The Child's Bath, 1891–92

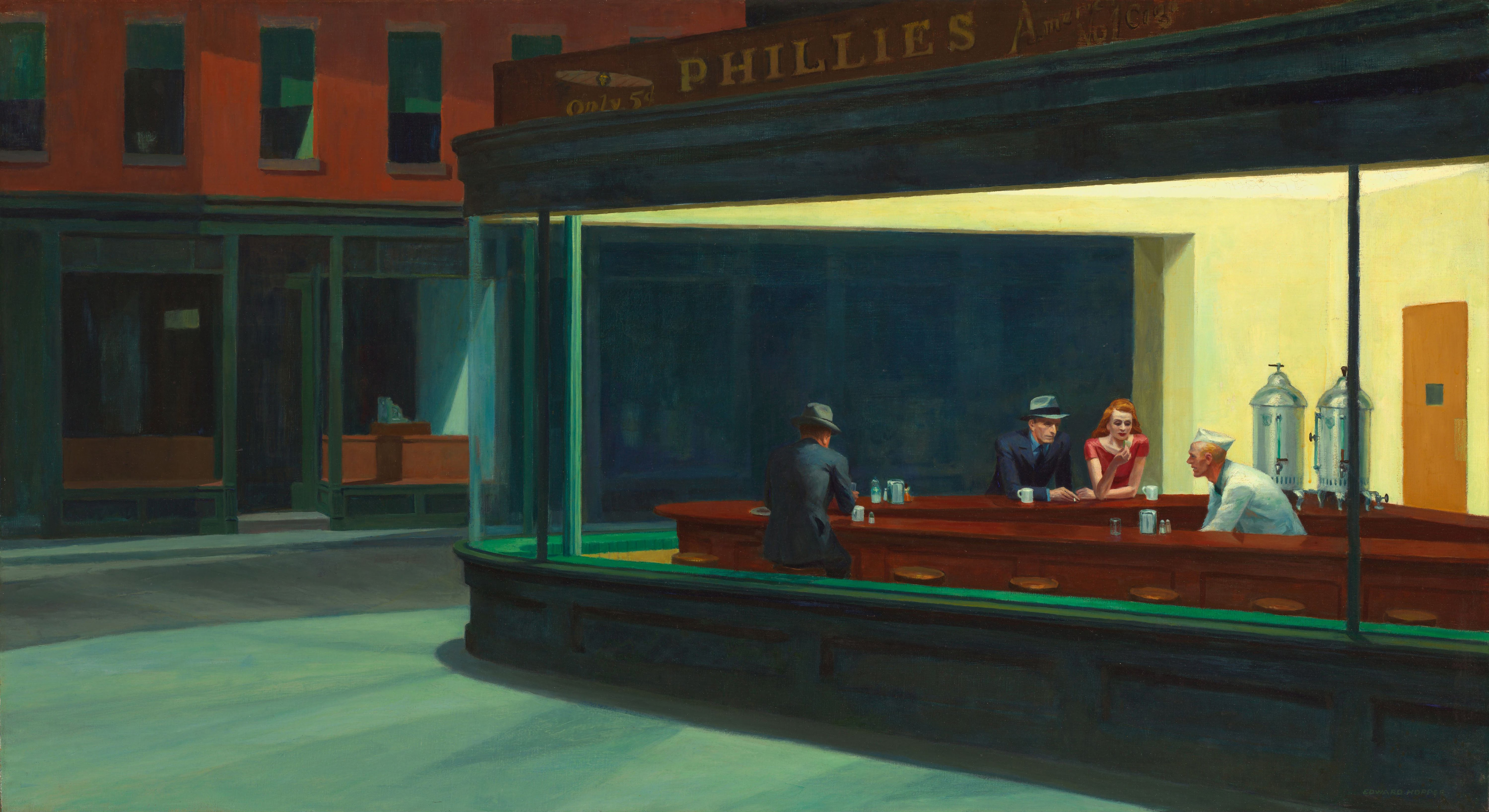
Edward Hopper's Nighthawks, 1942

The Art Institute's American Art collection contains some of the best-known works in the American canon, including Edward Hopper's Nighthawks, Grant Wood's American Gothic, and Mary Cassatt's The Child's Bath. The collection ranges from colonial silver to modern and contemporary paintings.

The museum purchased Nighthawks in 1942 for $3,000; its acquisition "launched" the painting into "immense popular recognition". Considered an "icon of American culture", Nighthawks is perhaps Hopper's most famous painting, and one of the most recognizable images in American art. Also well known, American Gothic has been in the museum's collection since 1930 and was only loaned outside of North America for the first time in 2016. Wood's painting depicts what has been called "the most famous couple in the world", a dour, rural-American, father and daughter. It was entered into a contest at the Art Institute in 1930, and although not a favorite of some, it won a medal and was acquired by the museum.

=== Ancient and Byzantine ===
The Art Institute's ancient collection spans nearly 4,000 years of art and history, showcasing Greek, Etruscan, Roman, and Egyptian sculpture, mosaics, pottery, jewelry, glass, and bronze and a robust and well-maintained collection of ancient coins. There are around 5,000 works in the collection, offering a comprehensive survey of the ancient and medieval Mediterranean world, beginning with the third millennium BC and extending to the Byzantine Empire. The collection also holds the mummy and mummy case of Paankhenamun.

=== Architecture and Design ===
The Department of Architecture and Design holds more than 140,000 works, from models to drawings from the 1870s to the present day. The collection covers landscape architecture, structural engineering, and industrial design, including the works of Frank Lloyd Wright, Ludwig Mies van der Rohe, and Le Corbusier.

=== Asian art ===
The Art Institute's Asian collection spans nearly 5,000 years, including significant works and objects from China, Korea, Japan, India, Southeast Asia, and the Near and Middle East. There are 35,000 objects in the collection, showcasing bronzes, ceramics, jades, textiles, screens, woodcuts, and sculptures. One gallery in particular attempts to mimic the quiet and meditative way in which Japanese screens are traditionally viewed.

=== European Decorative Arts ===
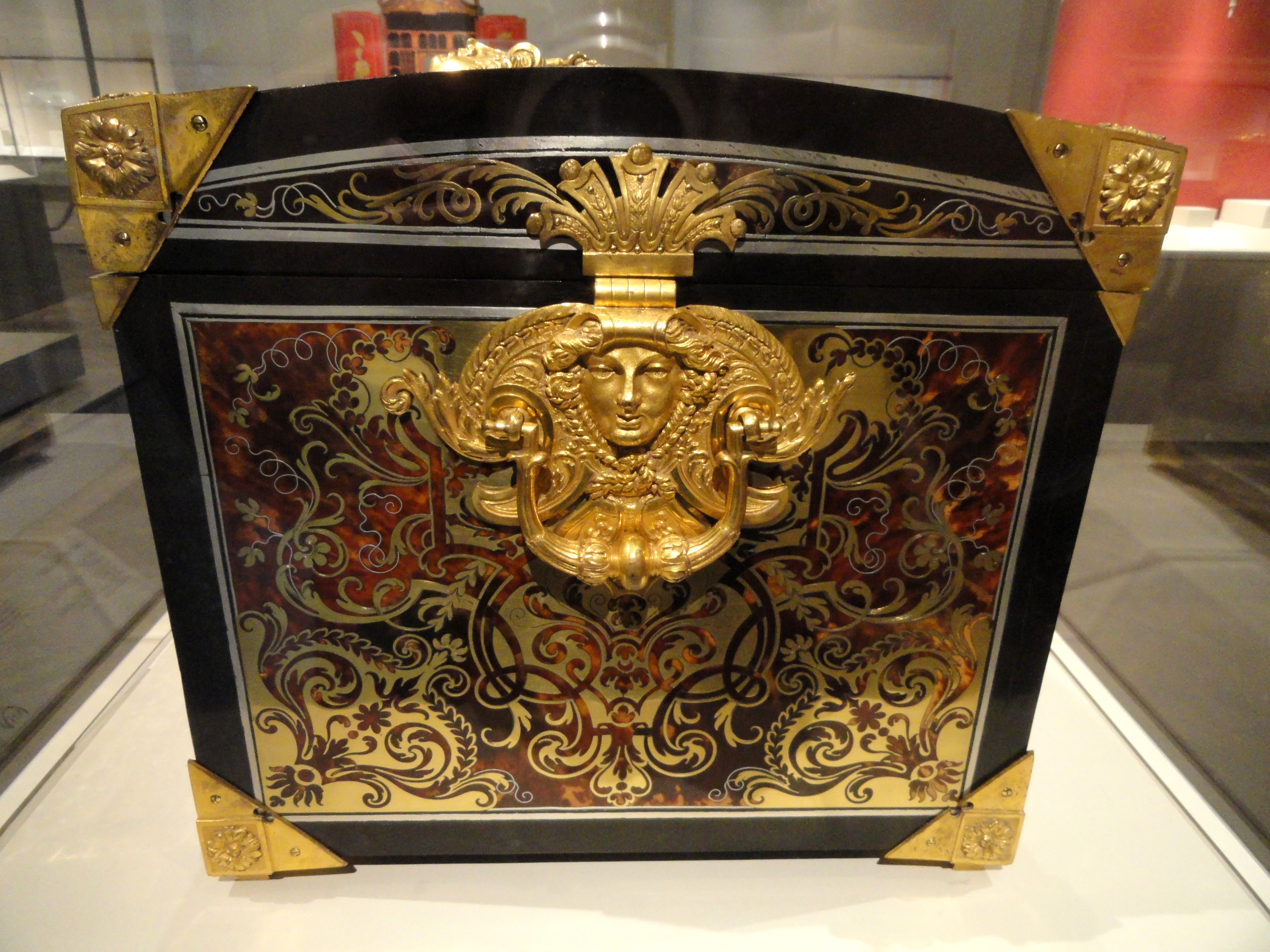
Boulle work from the 18th century

The Art Institute's collection of European decorative arts includes some 25,000 objects of furniture, ceramics, metalwork, glass, enamel, and ivory from 1100 AD to the present day. The department contains the 1,544 objects in the Arthur Rubloff Paperweight Collection and the 68 Thorne Miniature Rooms—a collection of miniaturized interiors of a 1:12 scale showcasing American, European, and Asian architectural and furniture styles from the Middle Ages to the 1930s (when the rooms were constructed). Both the paperweights and the Thorne Rooms are located on the ground floor of the museum.

=== European painting and sculptures ===
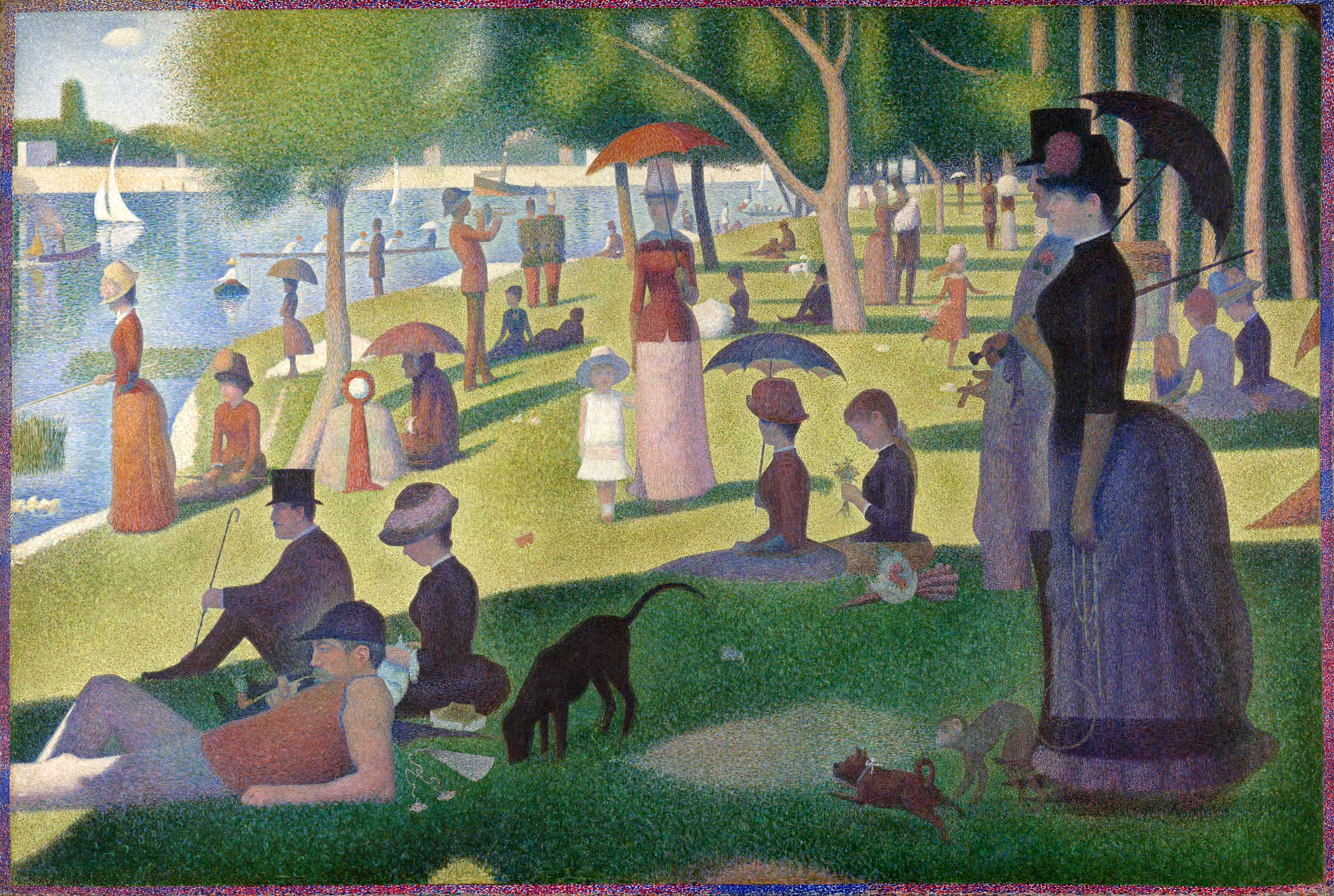
Georges Seurat's A Sunday Afternoon on the Island of La Grande Jatte, 1884–1886

The museum is most famous for its collections of Impressionist and Post-Impressionist paintings, widely regarded as one of the finest collections outside of France. Highlights include more than 30 paintings by Claude Monet, including six of his Haystacks and a number of Water Lilies. Also in the collection are important works by Pierre-Auguste Renoir such as Two Sisters (On the Terrace), and Gustave Caillebotte's Paris Street; Rainy Day. Post-Impressionist works include Paul Cézanne's The Basket of Apples, and Madame Cézanne in a Yellow Chair. At the Moulin Rouge by Henri de Toulouse-Lautrec is another highlight. The pointillist masterpiece, which also inspired a musical and was featured in the 1986 film Ferris Bueller's Day Off, Georges Seurat's Sunday Afternoon on La Grande Jatte—1884, is prominently displayed. Additionally, Henri Matisse's Bathers by a River, is an important example of his work. Highlights of non-French paintings of the Impressionist and Post-Impressionist collection include Vincent van Gogh's Bedroom in Arles and Self-portrait, 1887.

In the mid-1930s, the Art Institute received a gift of over one hundred works of art from Annie Swan Coburn ("Mr. and Mrs. Lewis Larned Coburn Memorial Collection"). The "Coburn Renoirs" became the core of the Art Institute's Impressionist painting collection.

The collection also includes the Medieval and Renaissance Art, Arms, and Armor holdings, including the George F. Harding Collection of arms and armor, and three centuries of Old Masters works.

=== Modern and Contemporary Art ===
Picasso's The Old Guitarist, 1903

The museum's collection of modern and contemporary art was significantly augmented when collectors Stefan Edlis and Gael Neeson gifted 40 plus master works to the department in 2015. Pablo Picasso's Old Guitarist, Henri Matisse's Bathers by a River, Constantin Brâncuși's Golden Bird, and René Magritte's Time Transfixed are highlights of the modern galleries, located on the third floor of the Modern Wing. The contemporary installation, located on the second floor, contains works by Andy Warhol, Cindy Sherman, Cy Twombly, Jackson Pollock, Jasper Johns, and other significant modern and contemporary artists.

=== Photography ===
The Art Institute did not officially establish a photography collection until 1949, when Georgia O'Keeffe donated a significant portion of the Alfred Stieglitz collection to the museum. Since then, the museum's collection has grown to approximately 20,000 works spanning the history of the artform from its inception in 1839 to the present.

=== Prints and Drawings ===
The print and drawings collection began with a donation by Elizabeth S. Stickney of 460 works in 1887, and was organized into its own department of the museum in 1911. Their holdings have subsequently grown to 11,500 drawings and 60,000 prints, ranging from 15th-century works to contemporary. The collection contains a strong group of the works of Albrecht Dürer, Rembrandt van Rijn, Francisco Goya, and James McNeill Whistler. Because works on paper are sensitive to light and degrade quickly, the works are on display infrequently in order to keep them in good condition for as long as possible.

=== Textiles ===
The Department of Textiles has more than 13,000 textiles and 66,000 sample swatches in total, covering an array of cultures from 300 BC to the present. From English needlework to Japanese garments to American quilts, the collection presents a diverse group of objects, including contemporary works and fiber art.

== Selections from the permanent collection ==
Other notable works are in the collection but the following examples are ones in the public domain and for which pictures are available. In 2018, as it redesigned its website, the Art Institute released images of 52,438 of its public domain works, under the Creative Commons Zero (CC0) licence.

=== Paintings ===
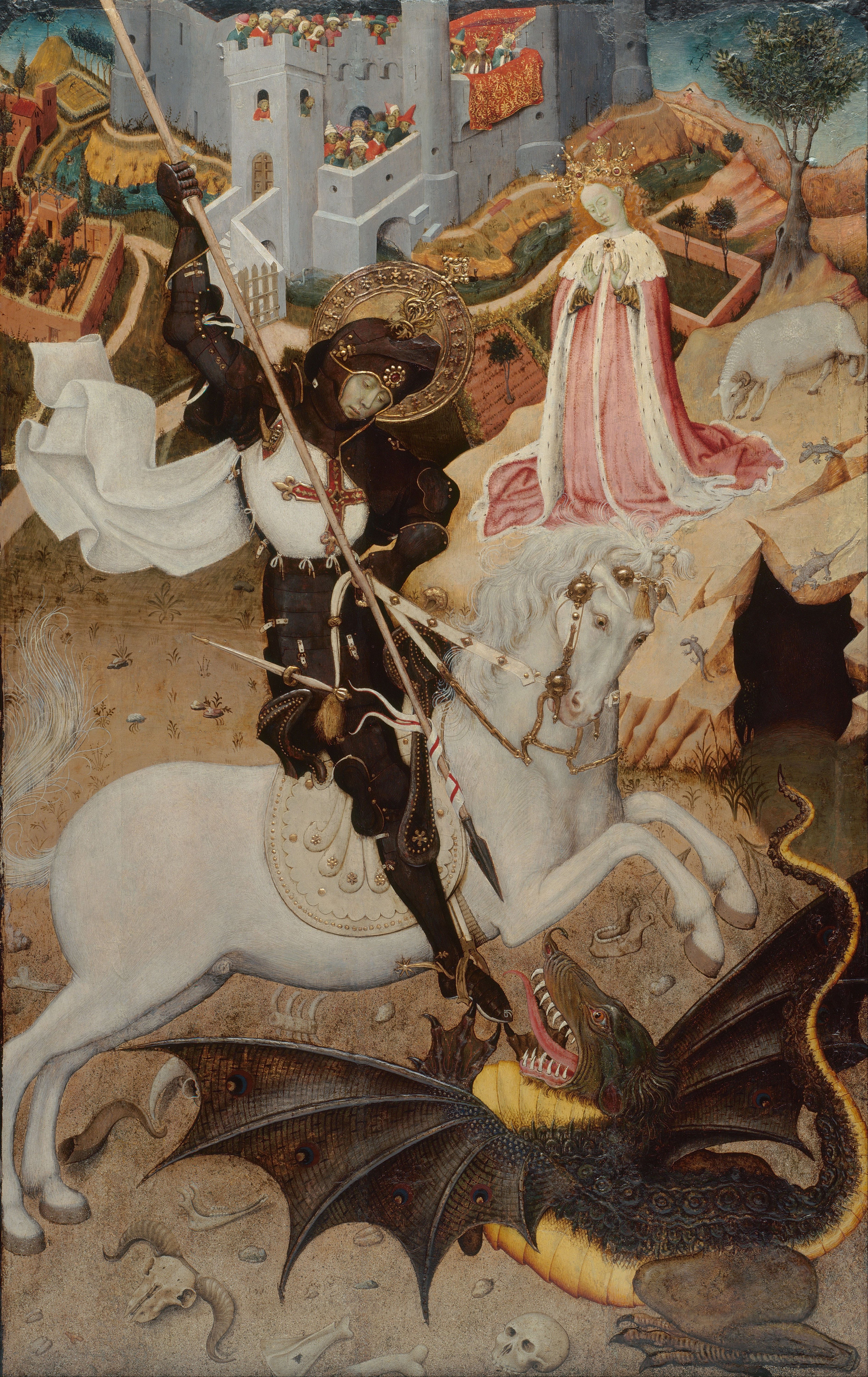
Martorell, Saint George and the Dragon, c. 1434/35

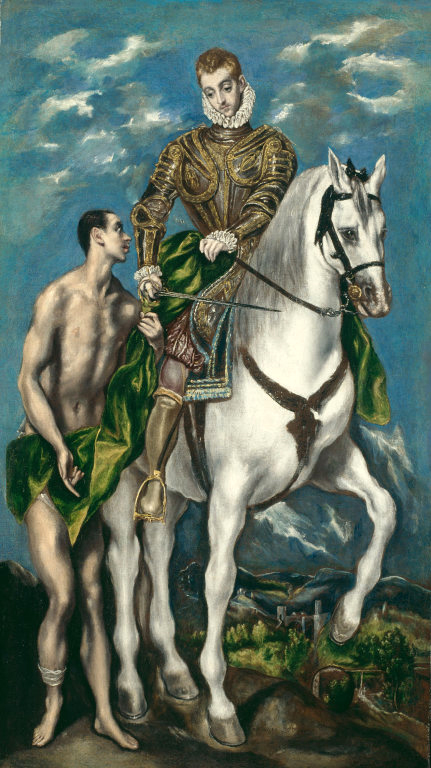
El Greco, Saint Martin and the Beggar, c. 1597–1600

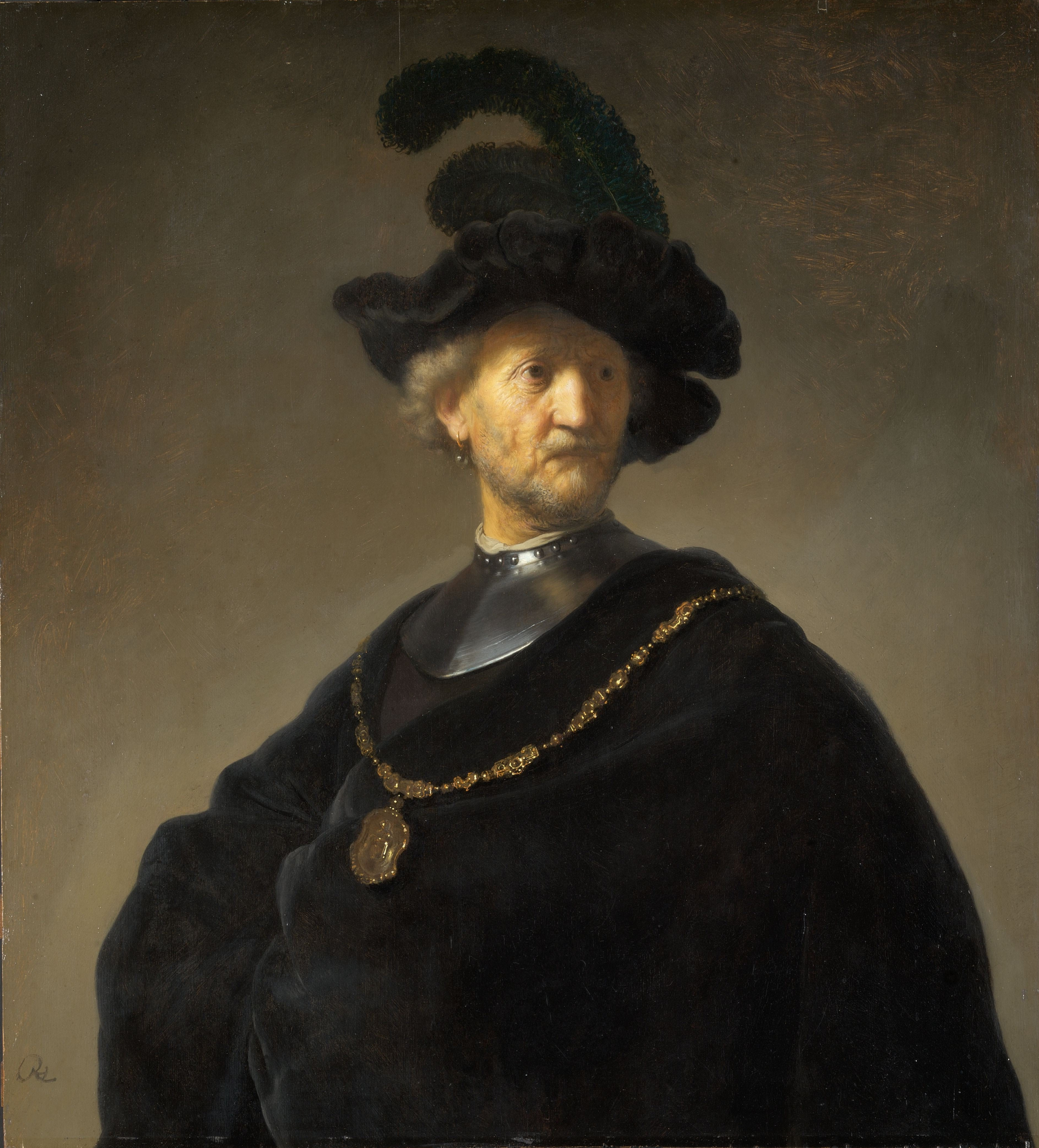
Rembrandt, Old Man with a Gold Chain, c. 1631

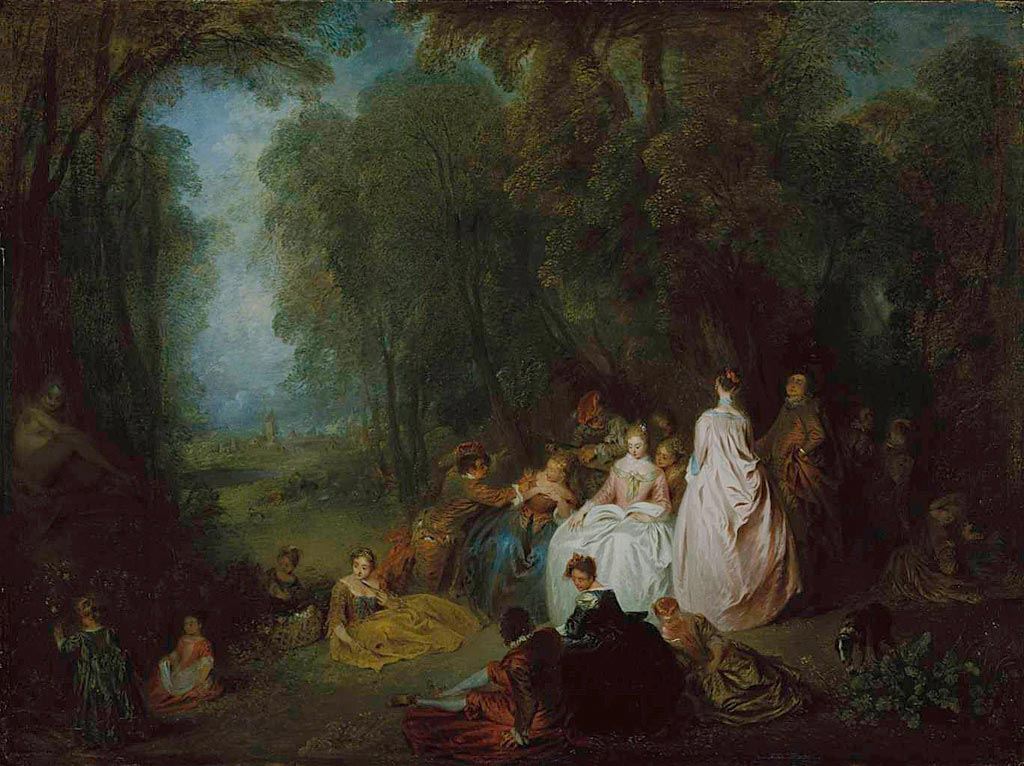
Antoine Watteau, Fête champêtre (Pastoral Gathering), 1718–1721

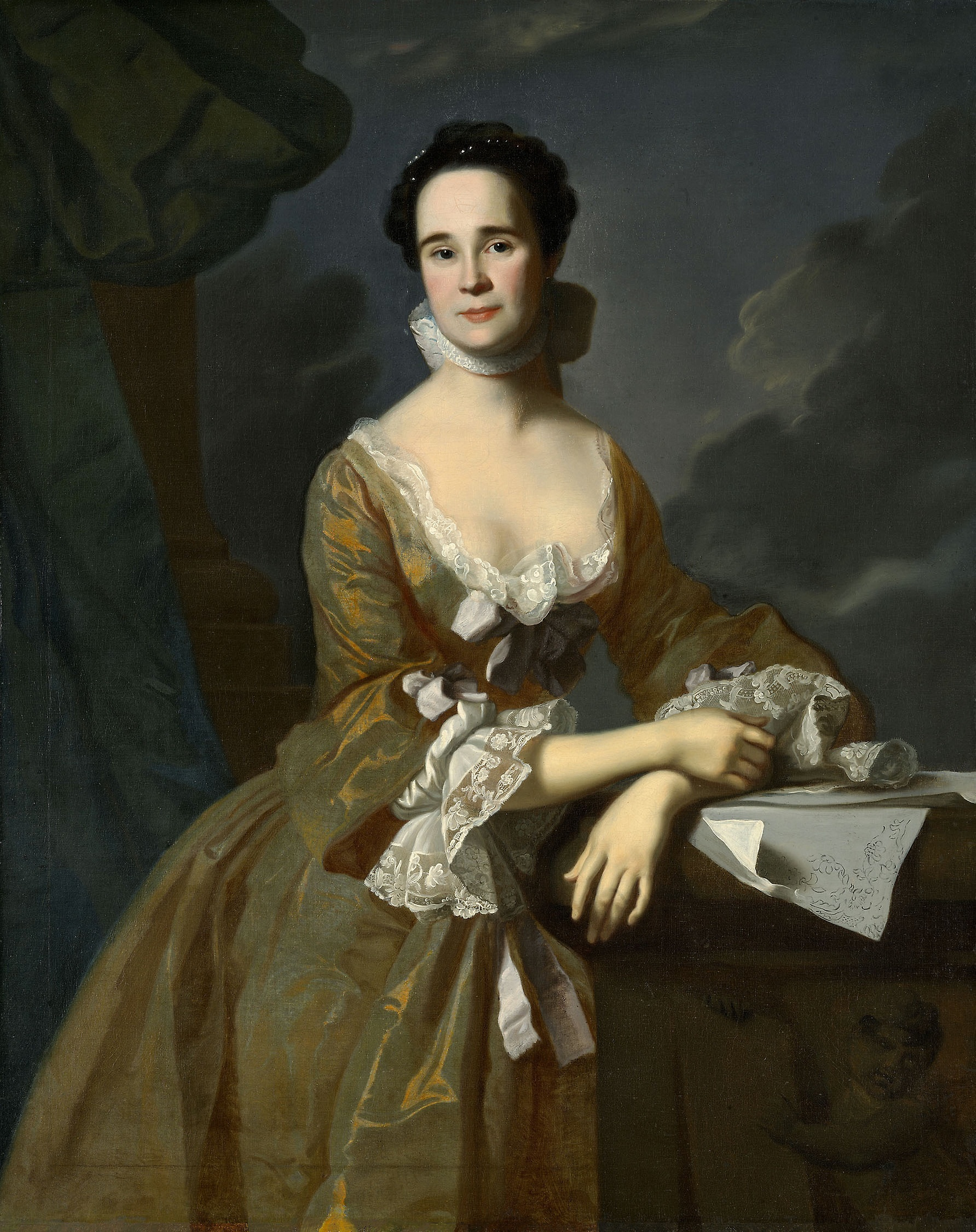
John Singleton Copley, "Mrs. Daniel Hubbard (Mary Greene), 1764

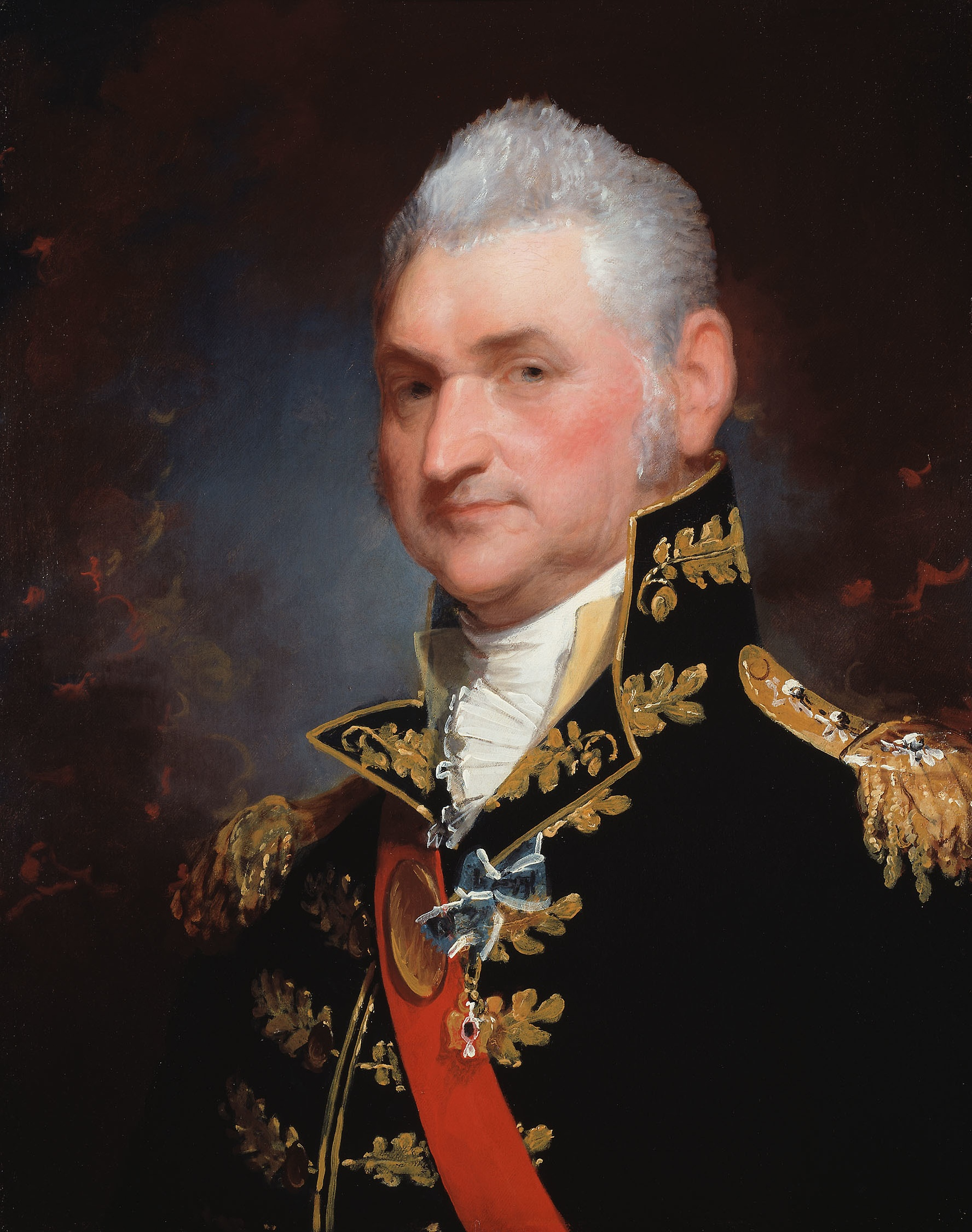
Gilbert Stuart, Portrait of Henry Dearborn, 1812

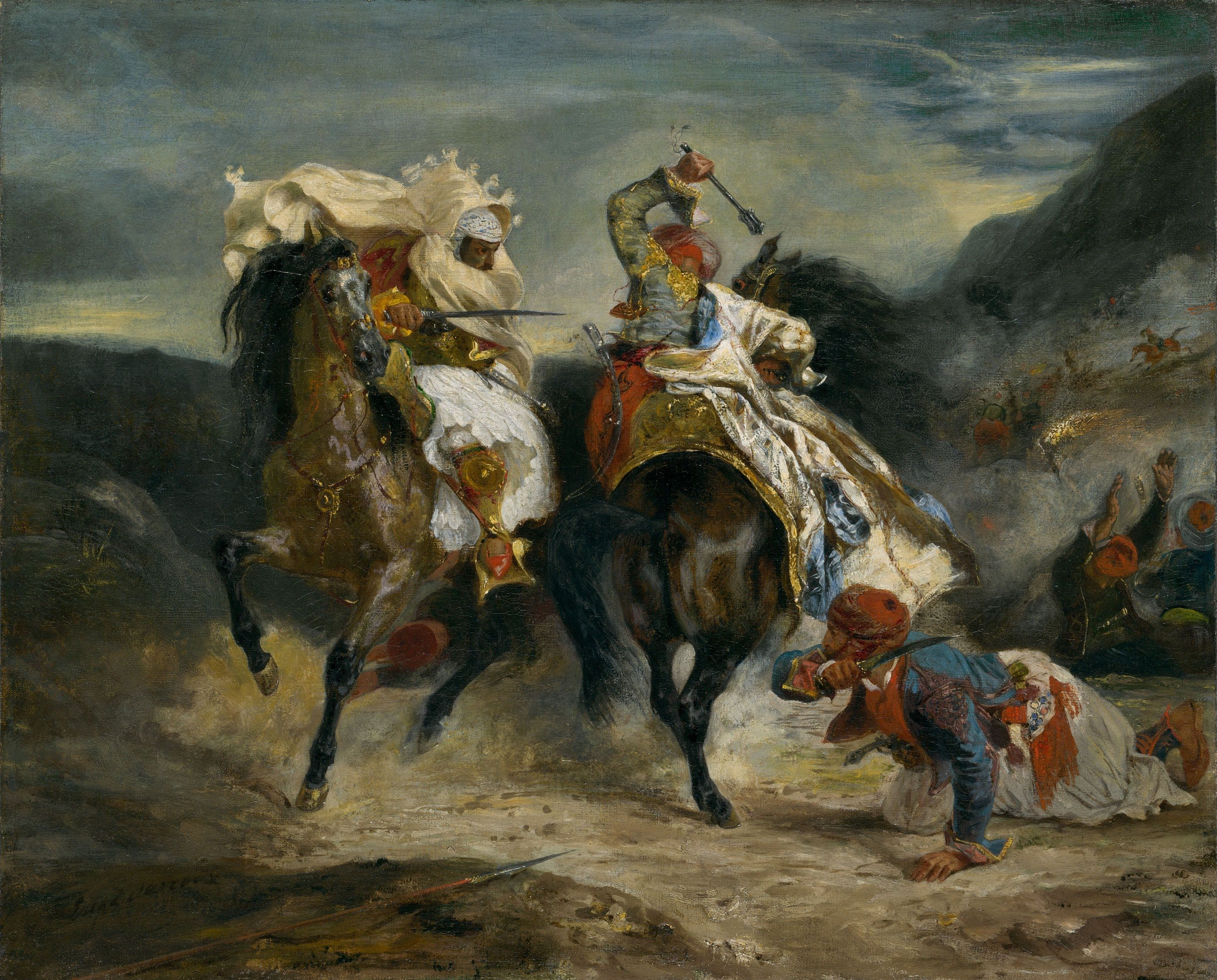
Eugène Delacroix, The Combat of the Giaour and Hassan, 1826

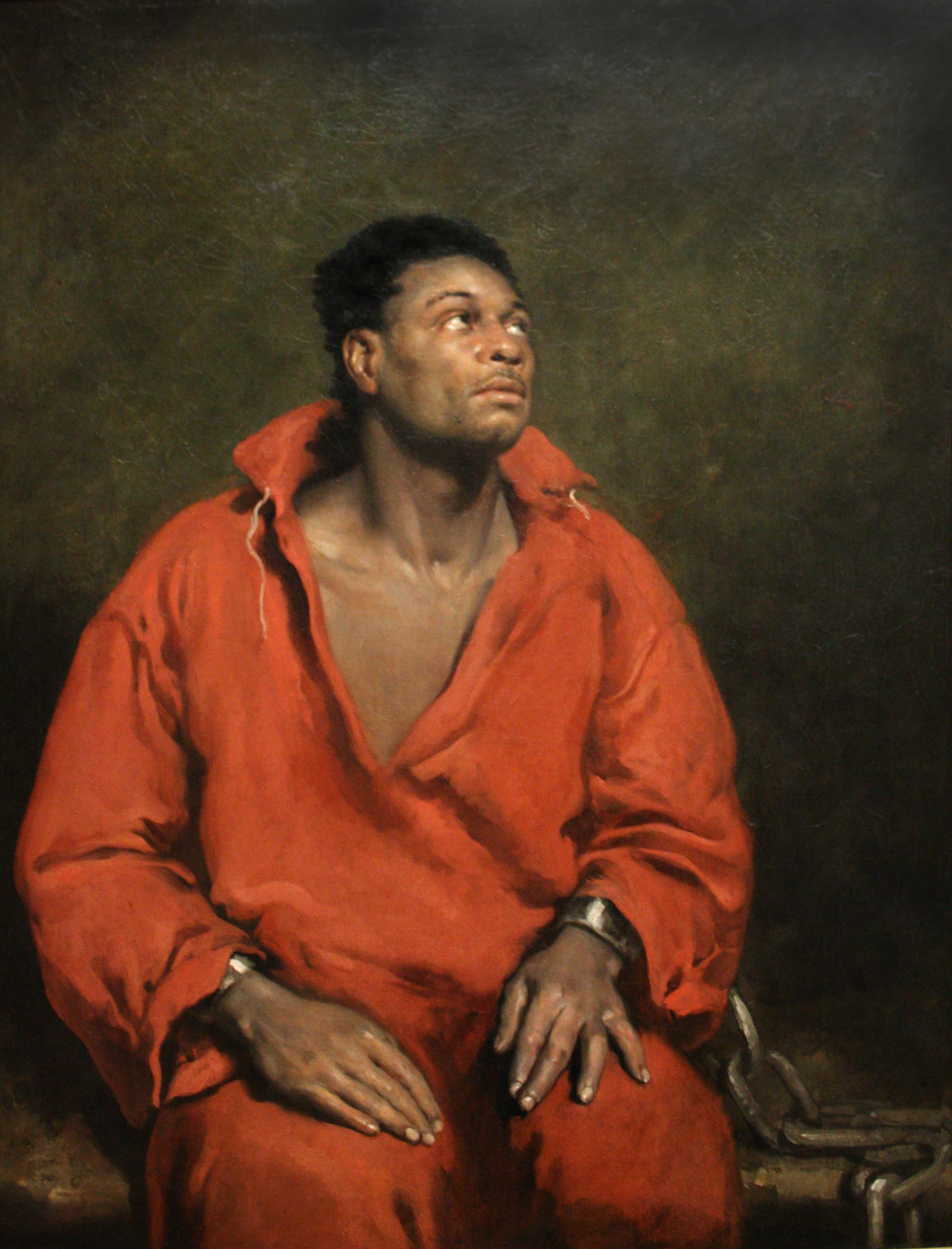
John Simpson, The Captive Slave, 1827

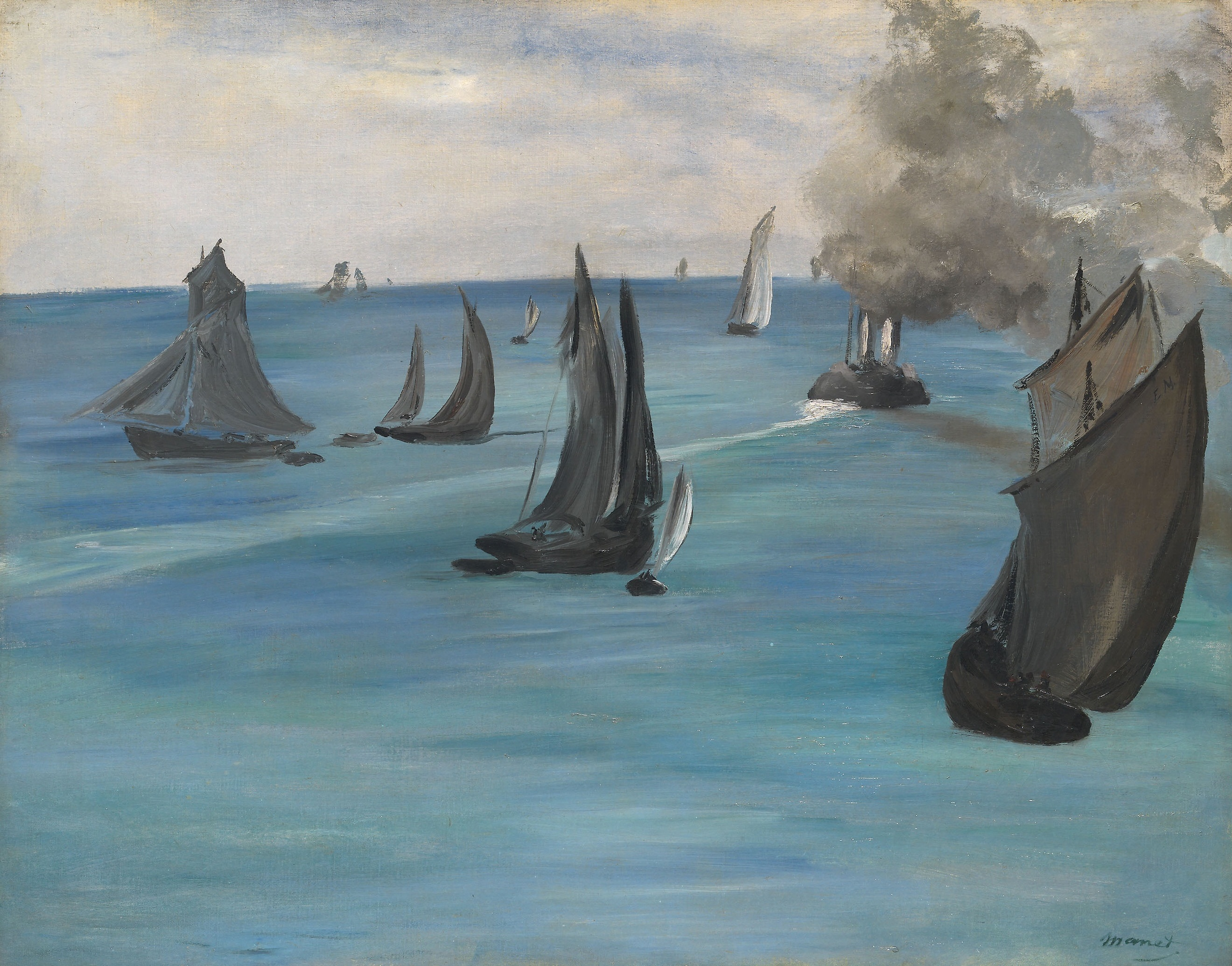
Édouard Manet, Seascape Calm Weather, 1864–1865

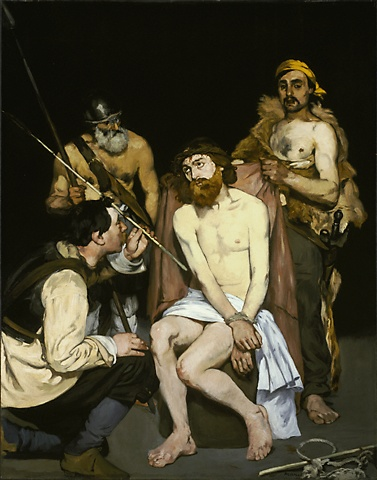
Édouard Manet, Jesus Mocked by the Soldiers, 1864–1865

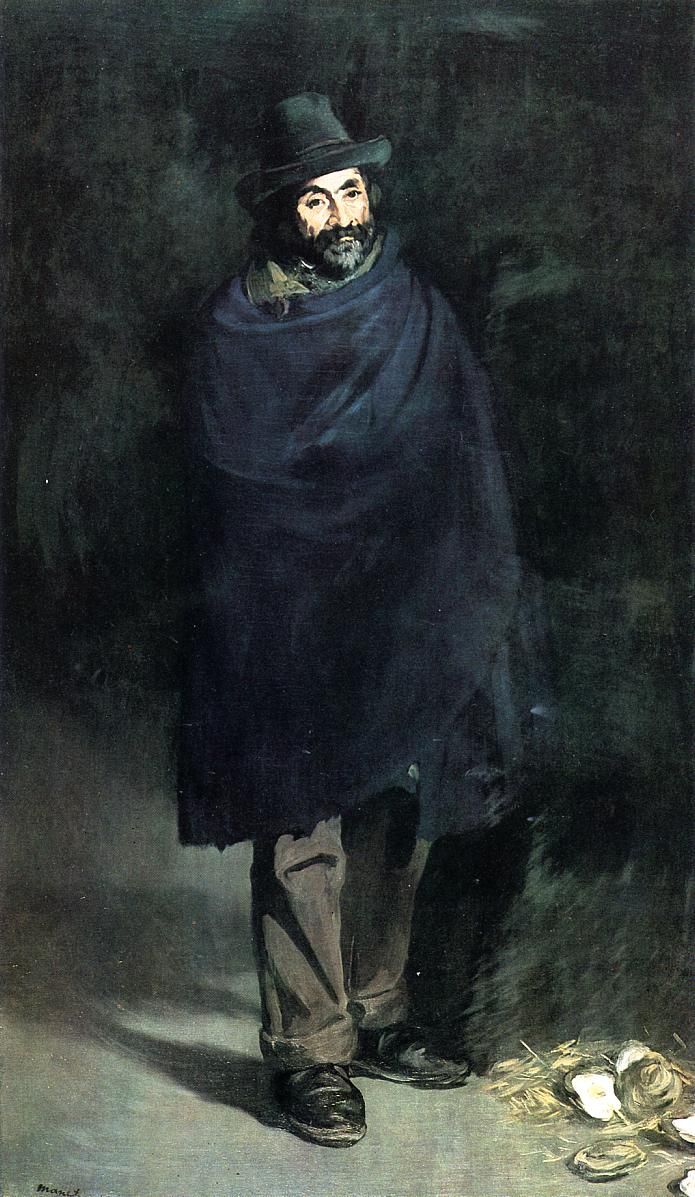
Édouard Manet, The Philosopher, (Beggar with Oysters), 1864–1867

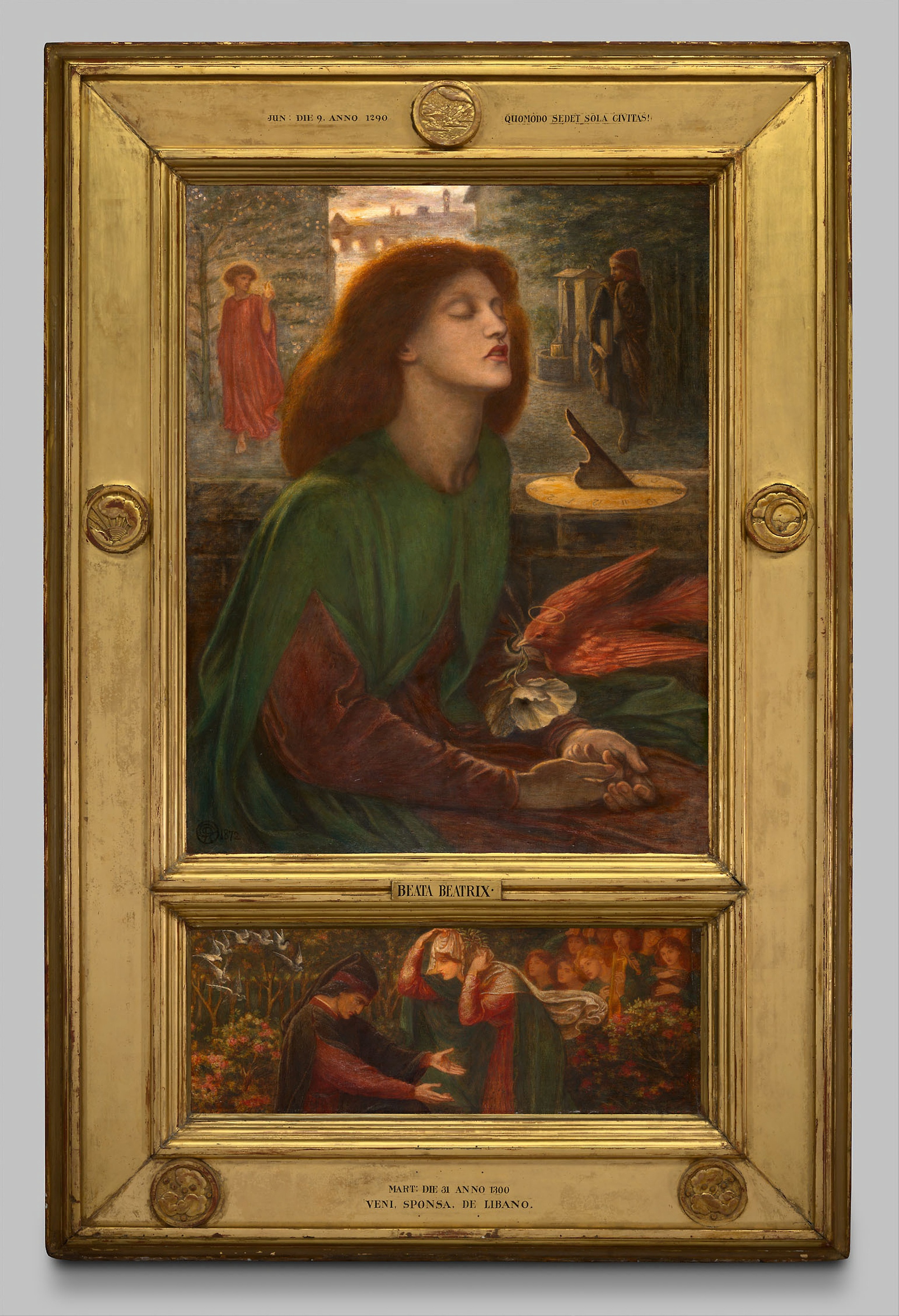
Dante Gabriel Rossetti, Beata Beatrix, c. 1871–1872

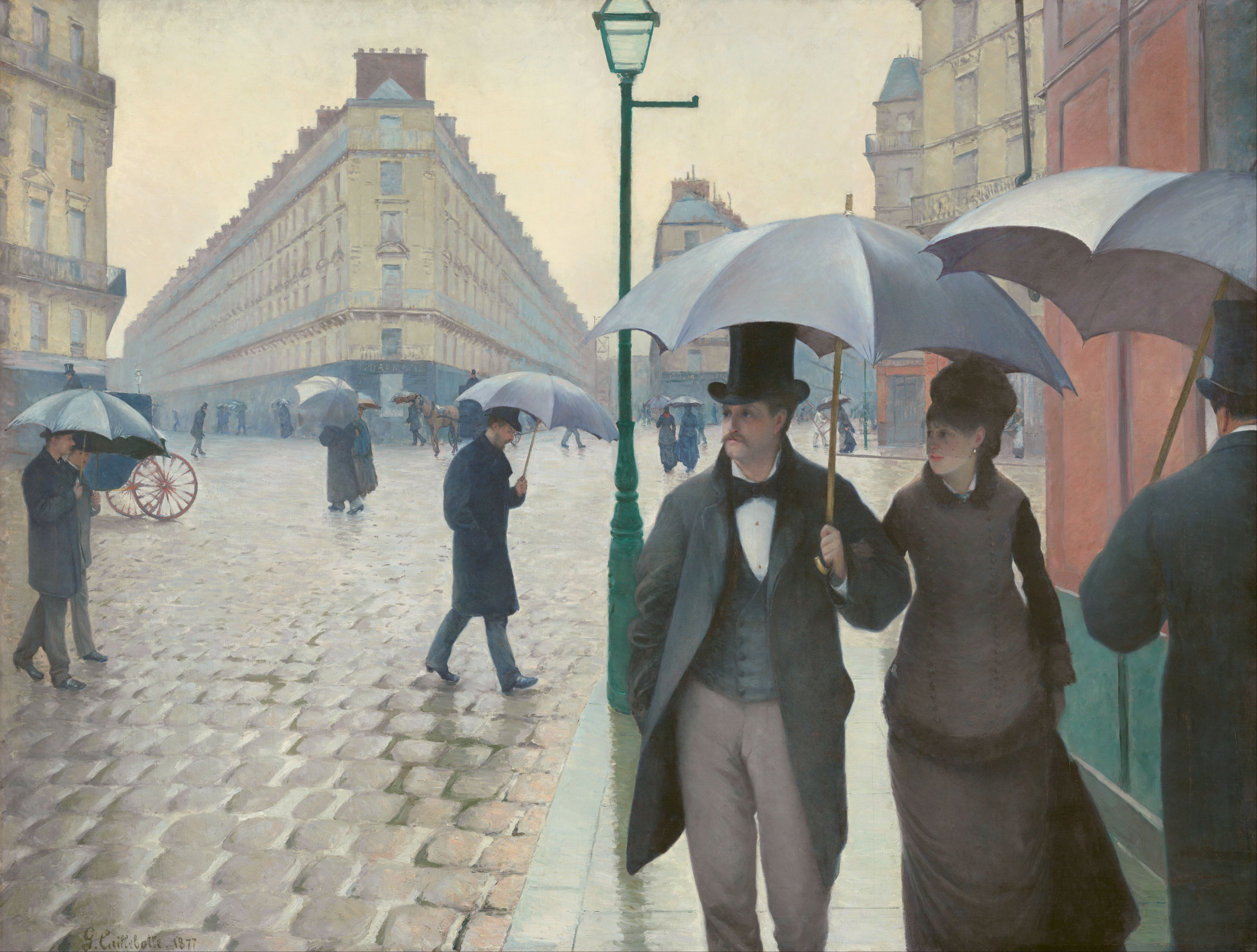
Gustave Caillebotte, Paris Street; Rainy Day, 1876–1877

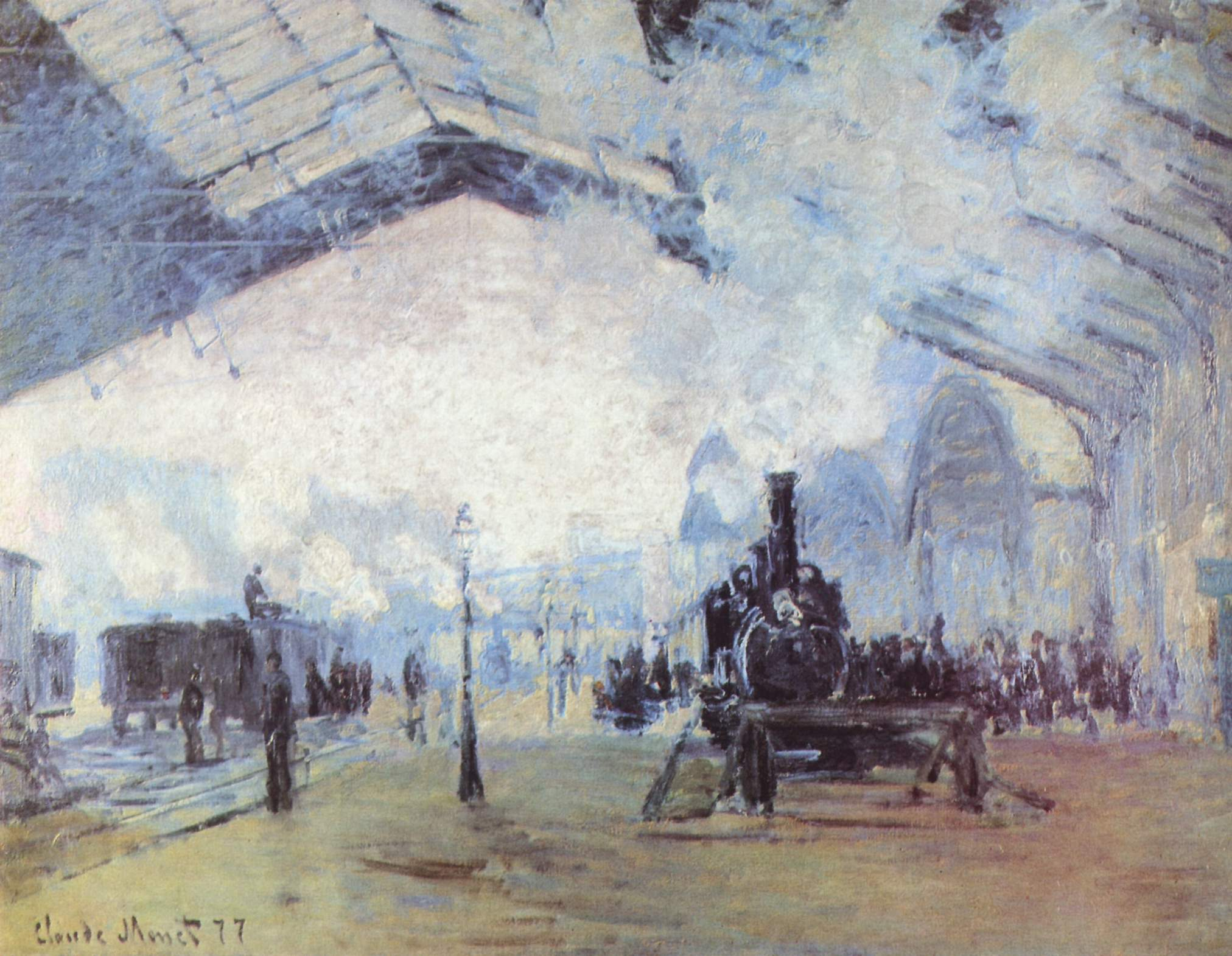
Claude Monet, Arrival of the Normandy Train, Gare Saint-Lazare, 1877

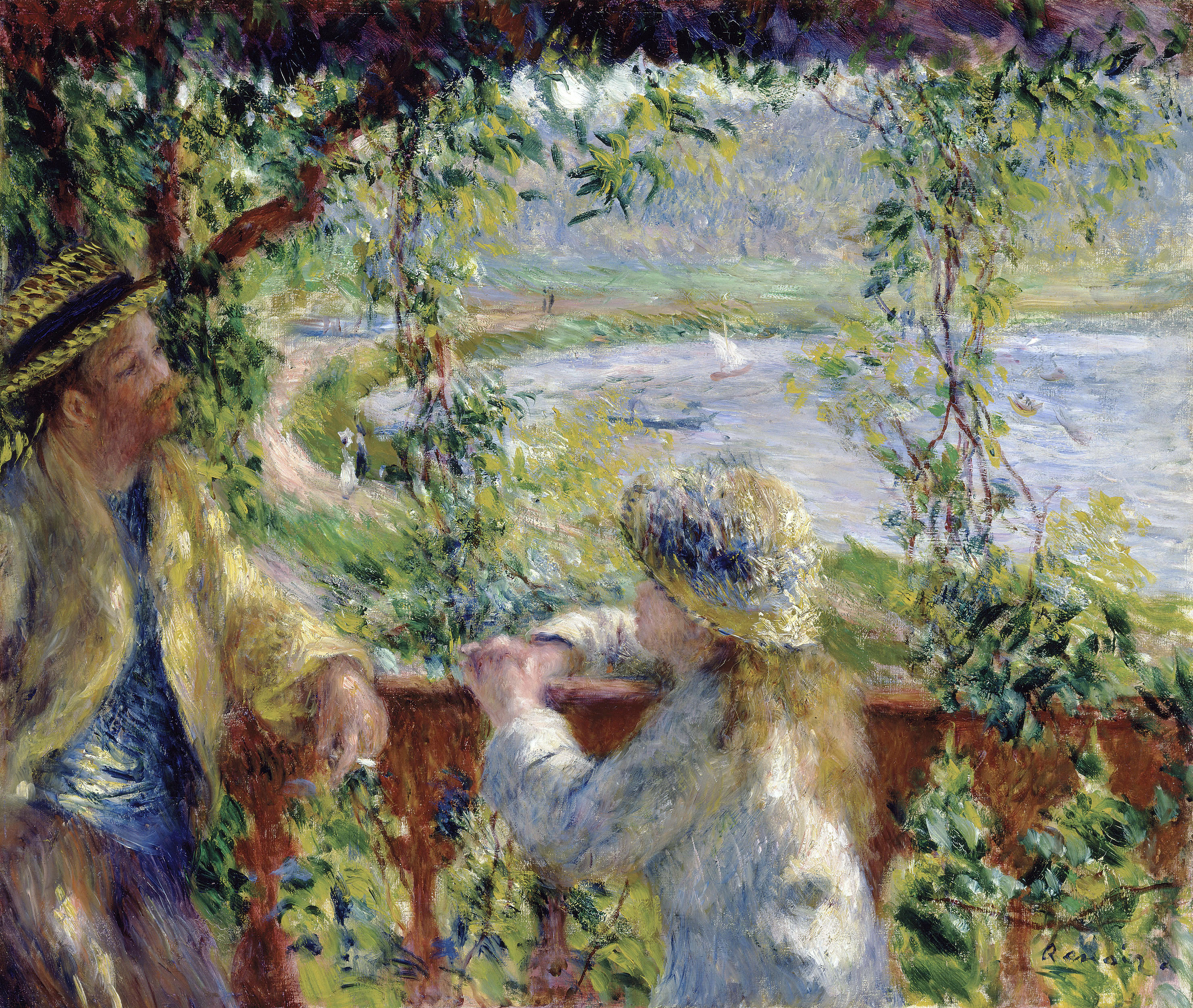
Pierre-Auguste Renoir, By the Water, 1880

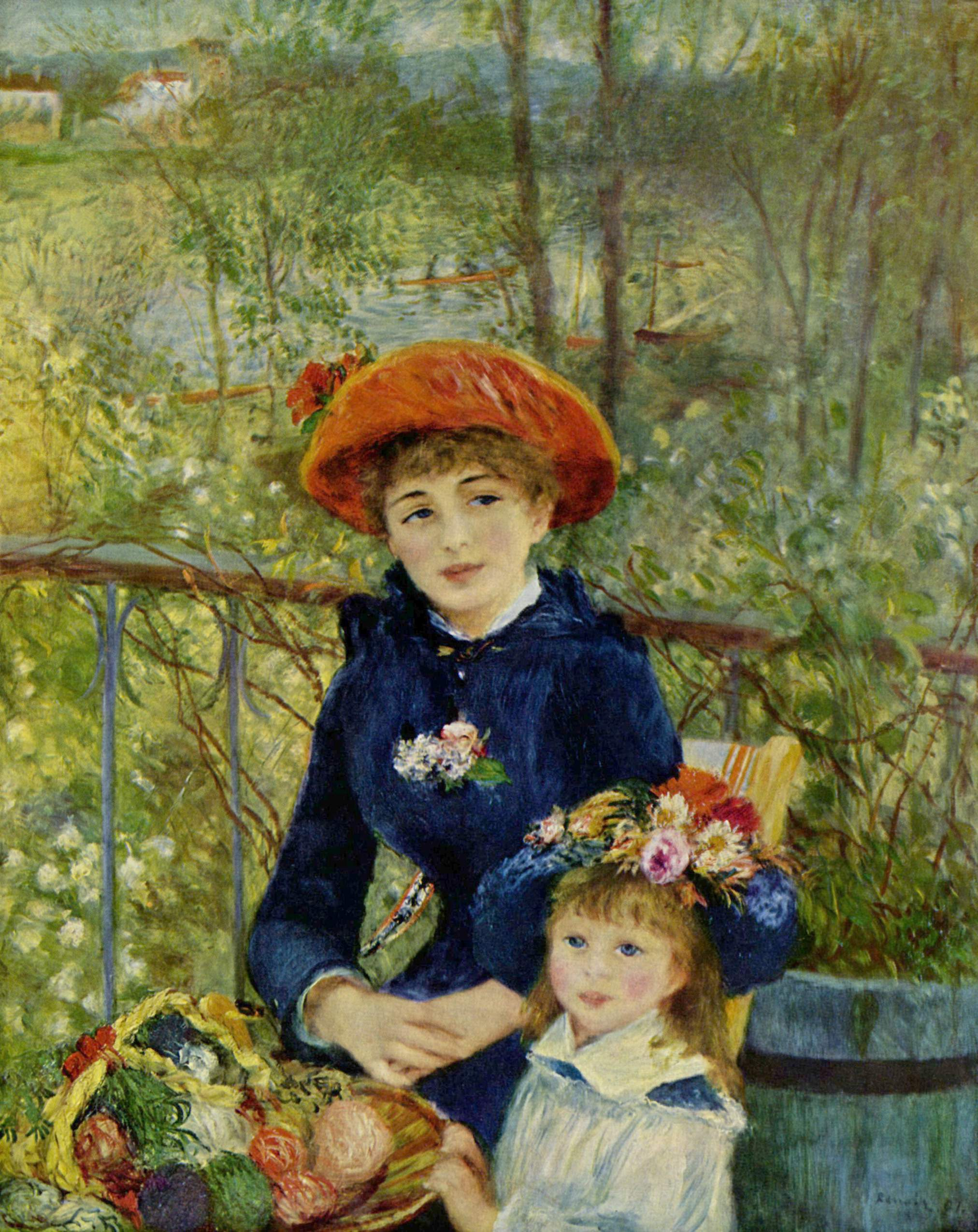
Pierre-Auguste Renoir, Two Sisters (On the Terrace), 1881

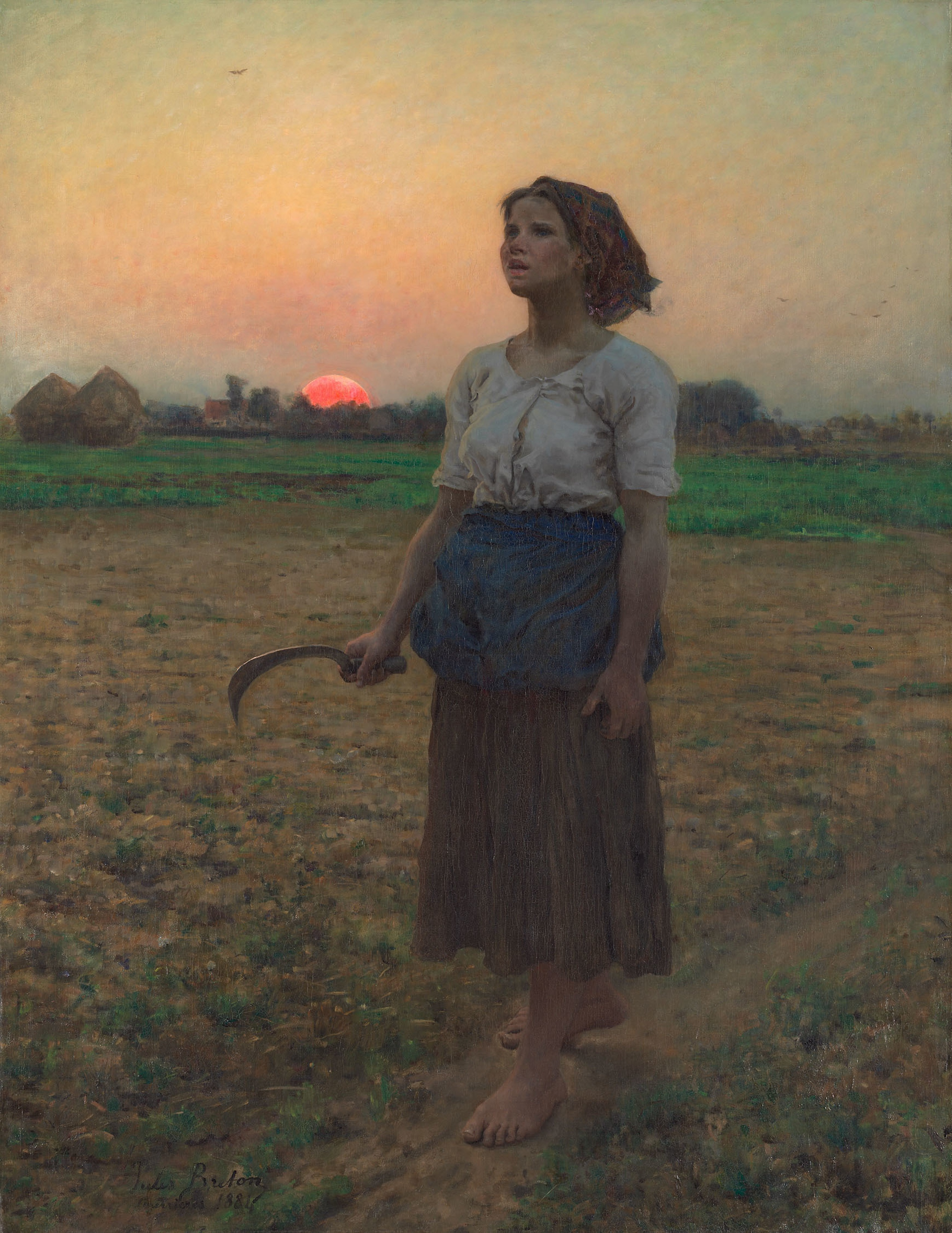
Jules Breton, The Song of the Lark, 1884

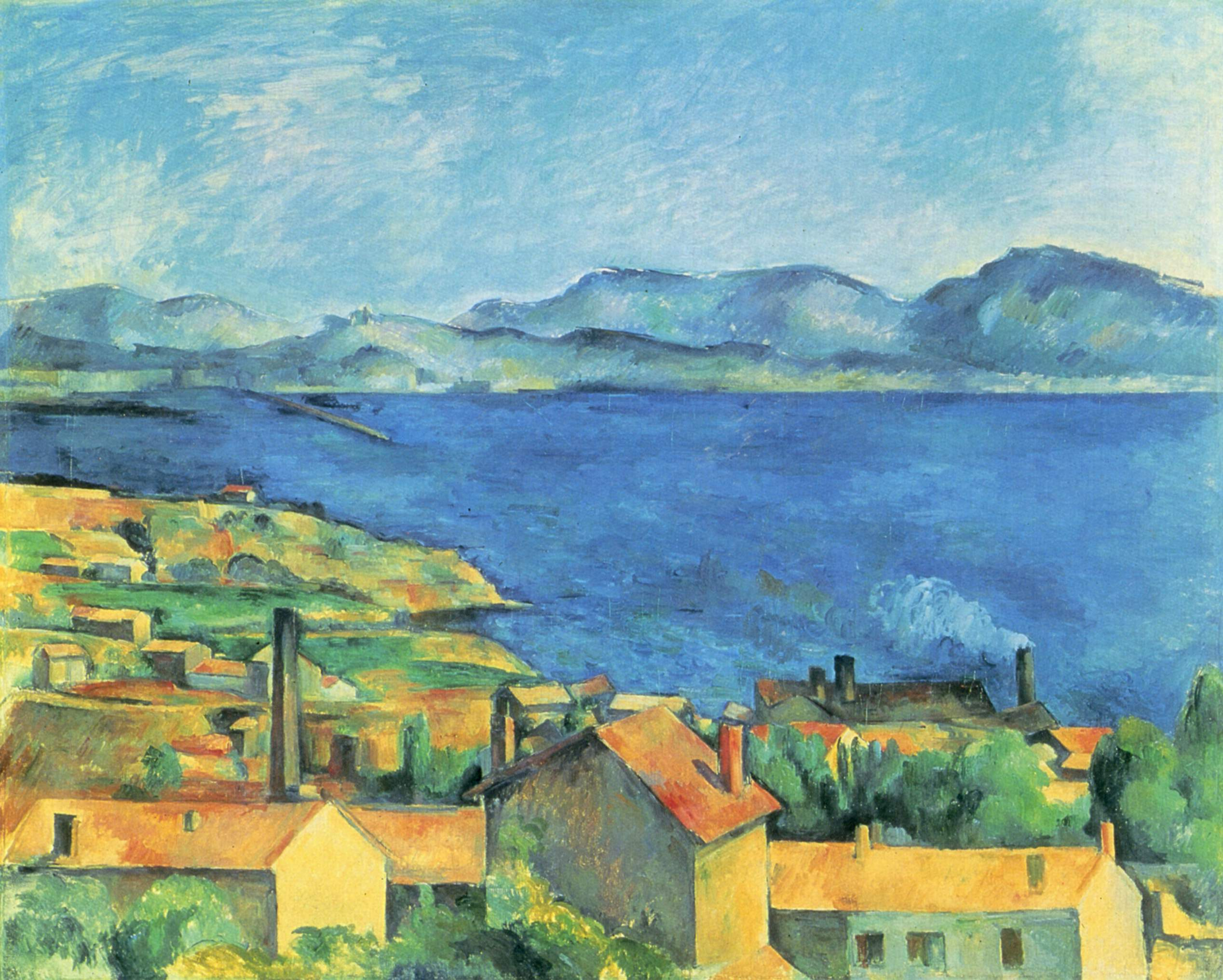
Paul Cézanne, The Bay of Marseilles, view from L'Estaque, 1885

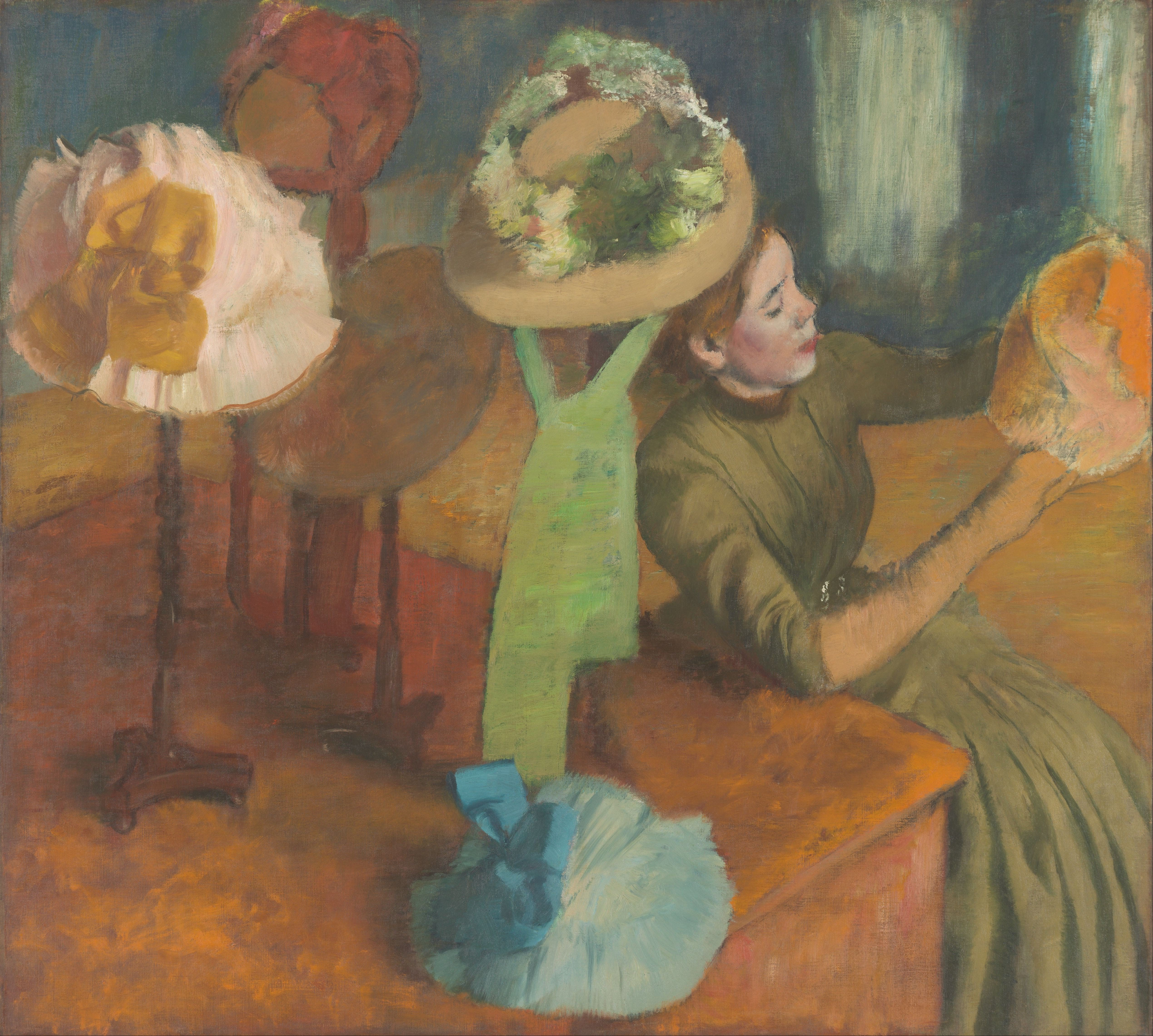
Edgar Degas, The Millinery Shop, 1885

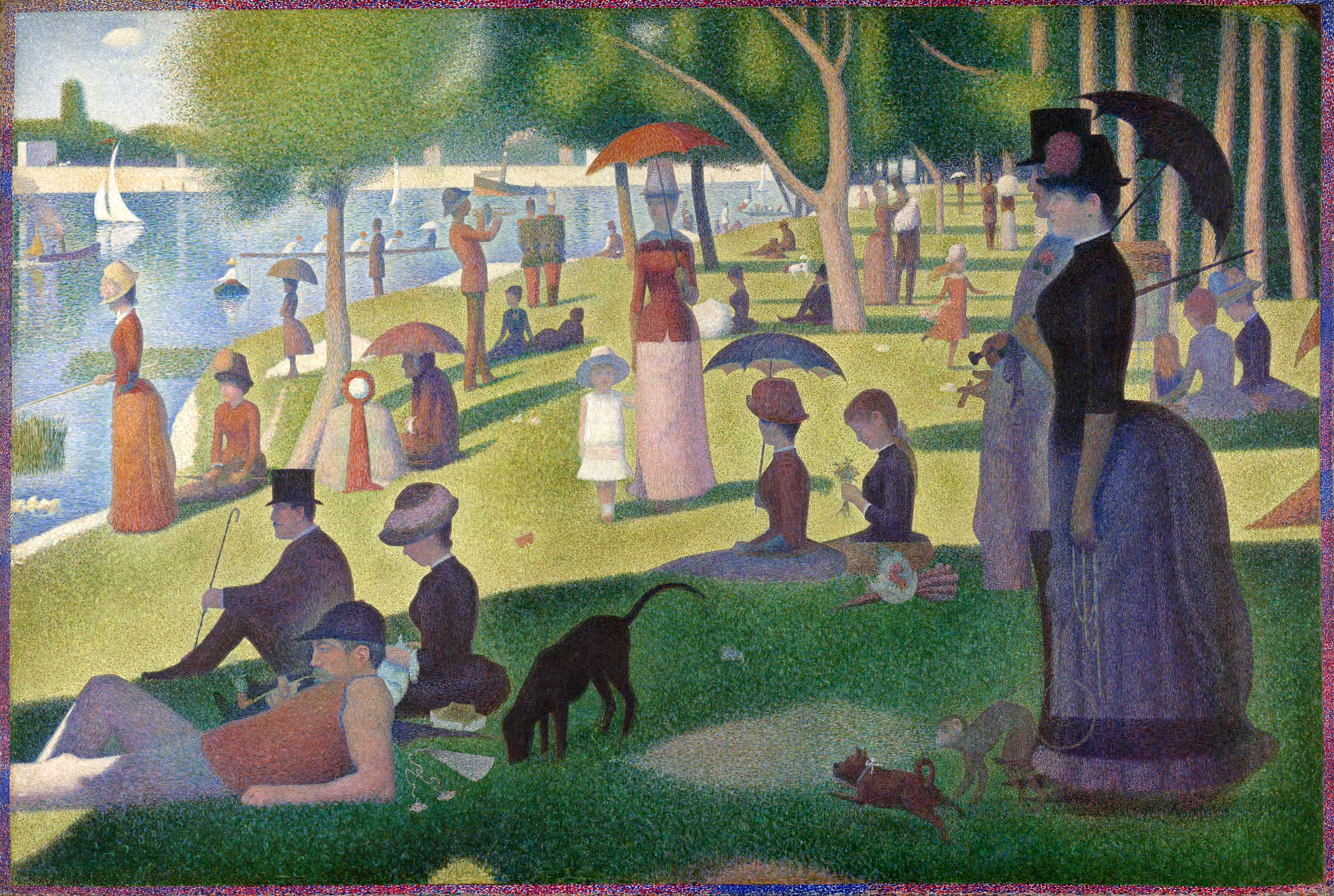
Georges-Pierre Seurat, Sunday Afternoon on the Island of La Grande Jatte 1884–1886

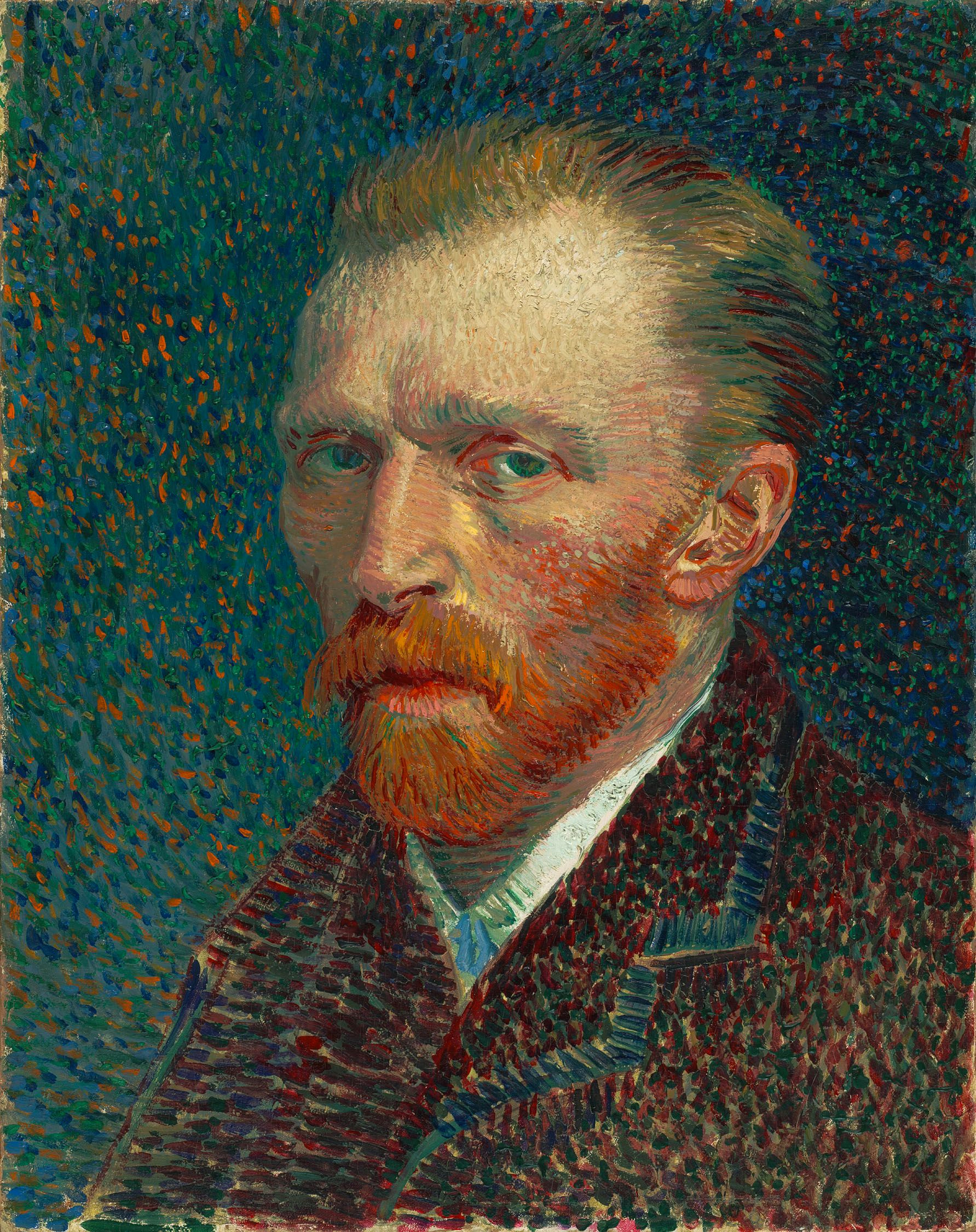
Vincent van Gogh, Self-portrait, 1887

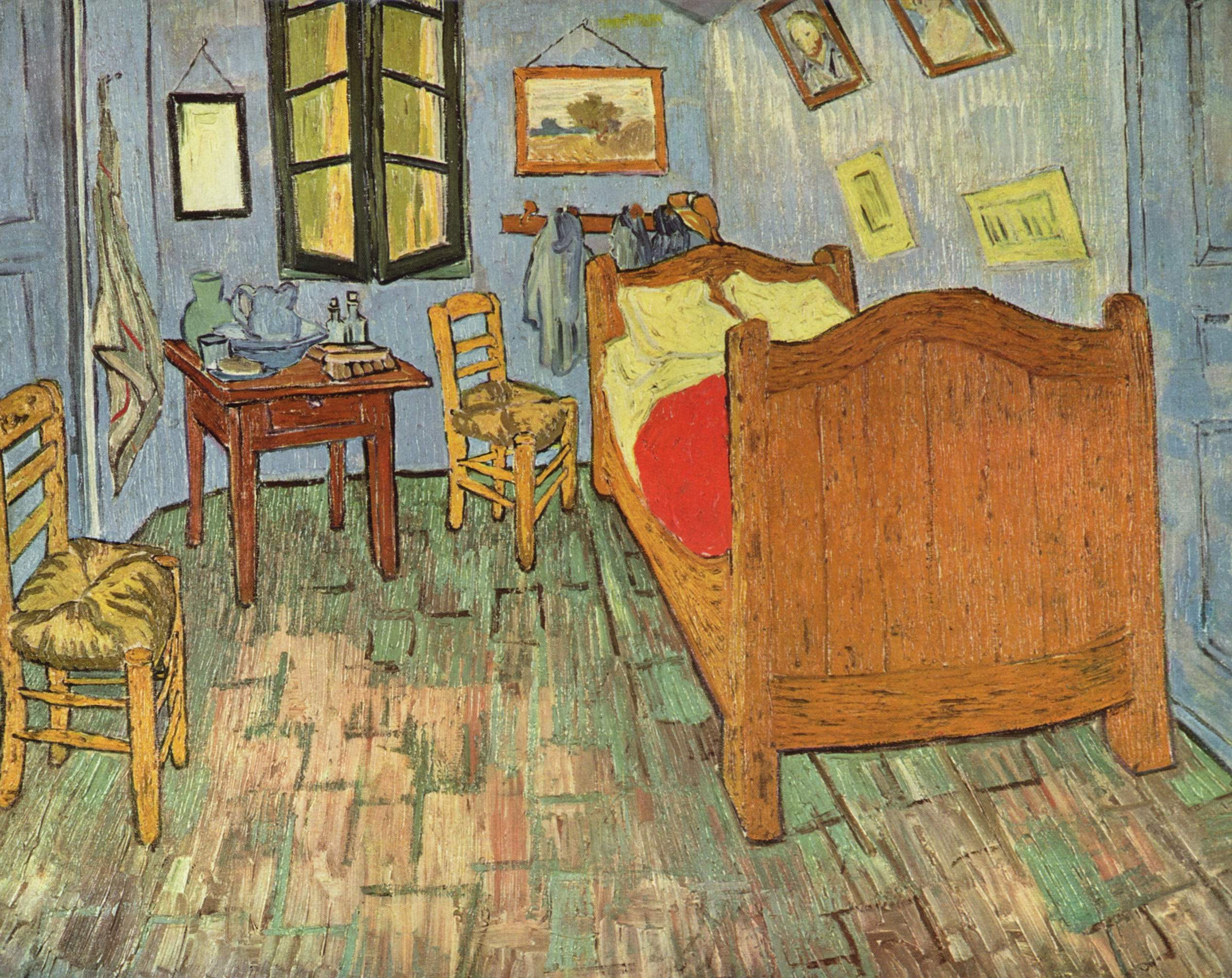
Vincent van Gogh, Bedroom in Arles, 1888

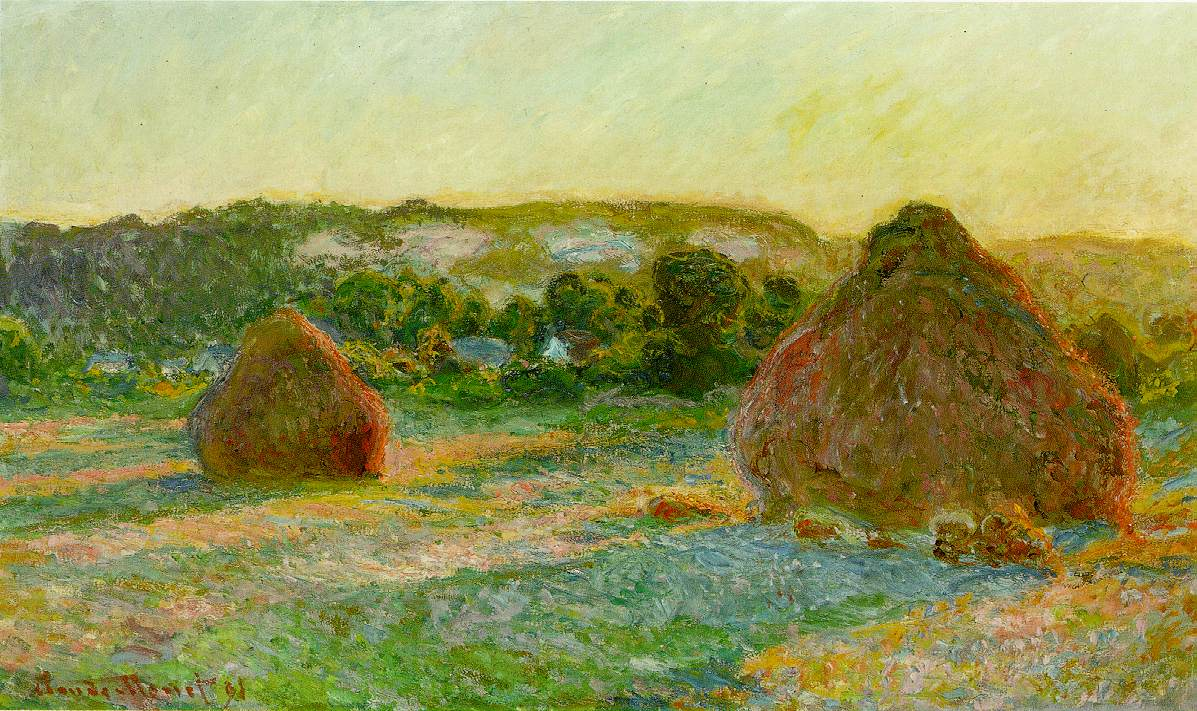
Claude Monet, Wheatstacks (End of Summer), 1890–1891

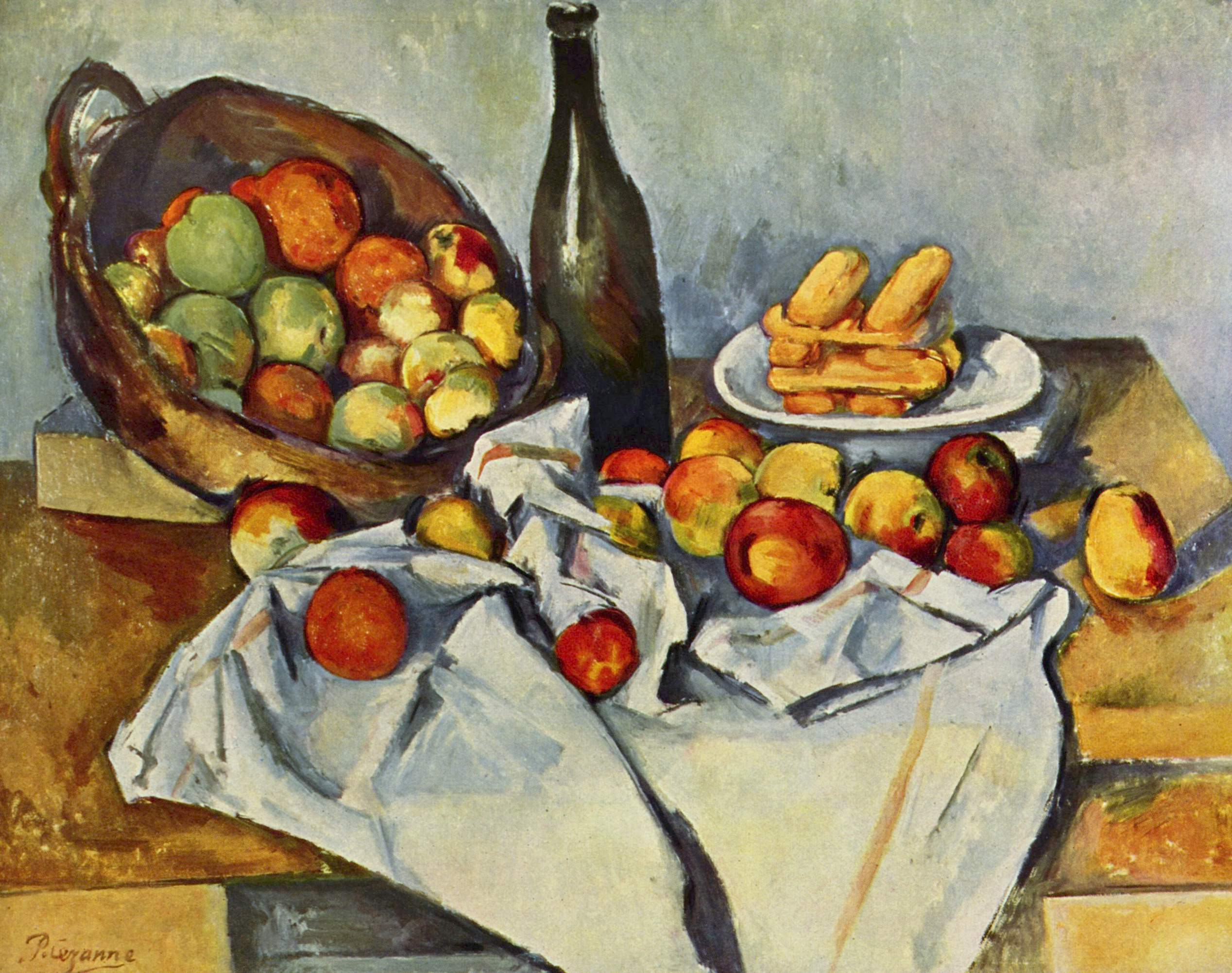
Paul Cézanne, The Basket of Apples, c. 1890s

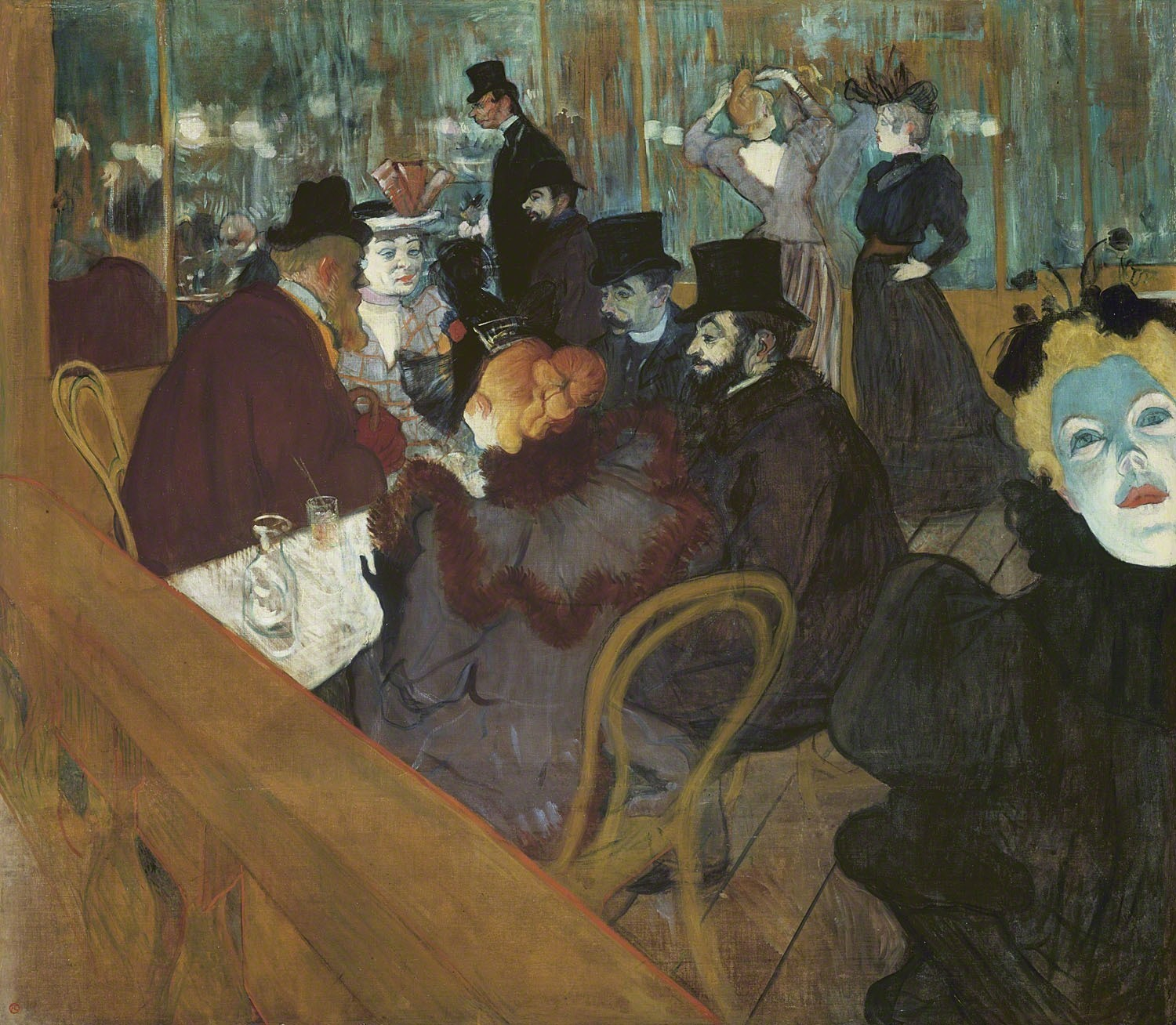
Henri de Toulouse-Lautrec, At the Moulin Rouge, 1892

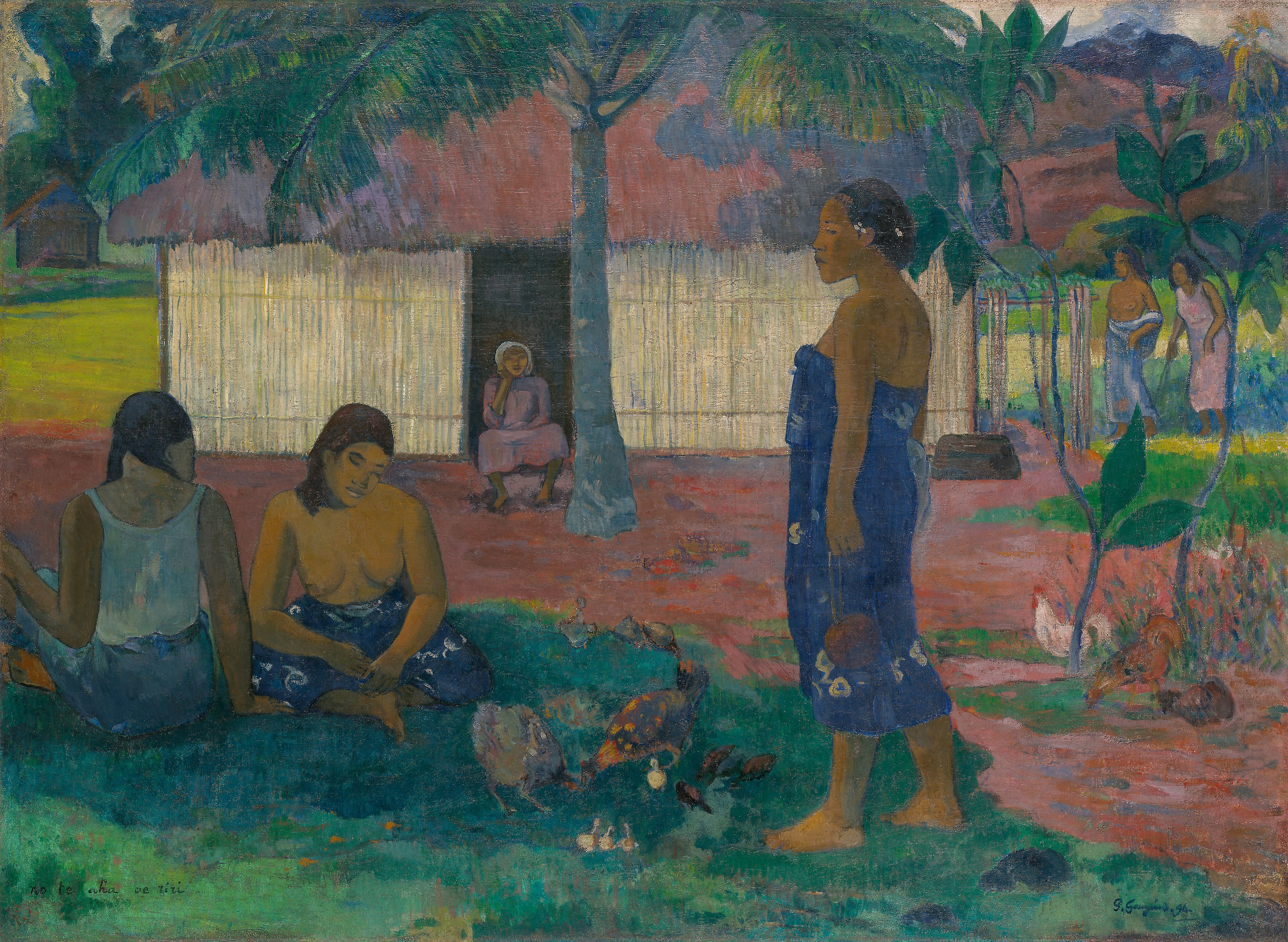
Paul Gauguin, Why are you angry? (No te aha oe Riri), 1896

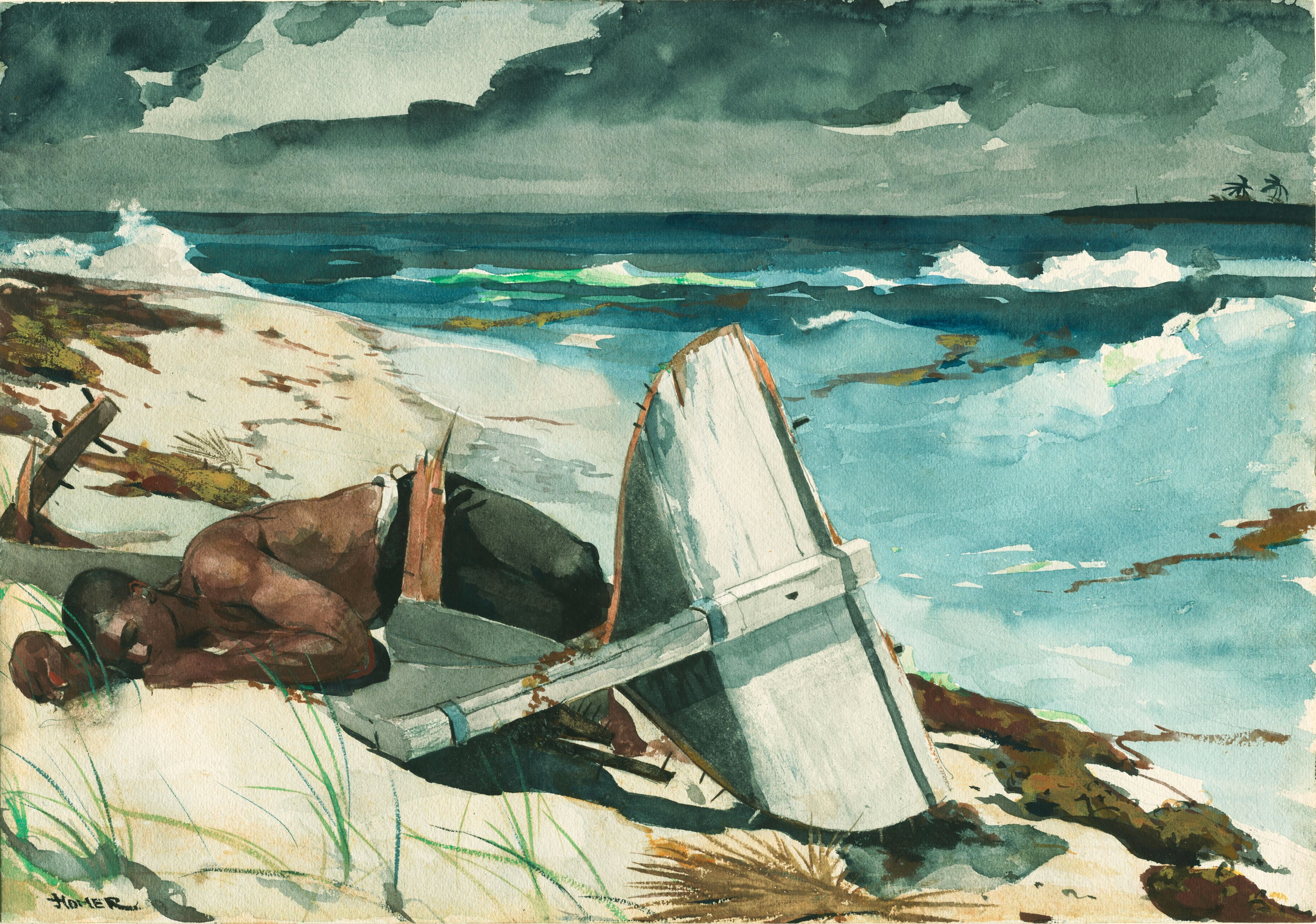
Winslow Homer, After the Hurricane, 1899

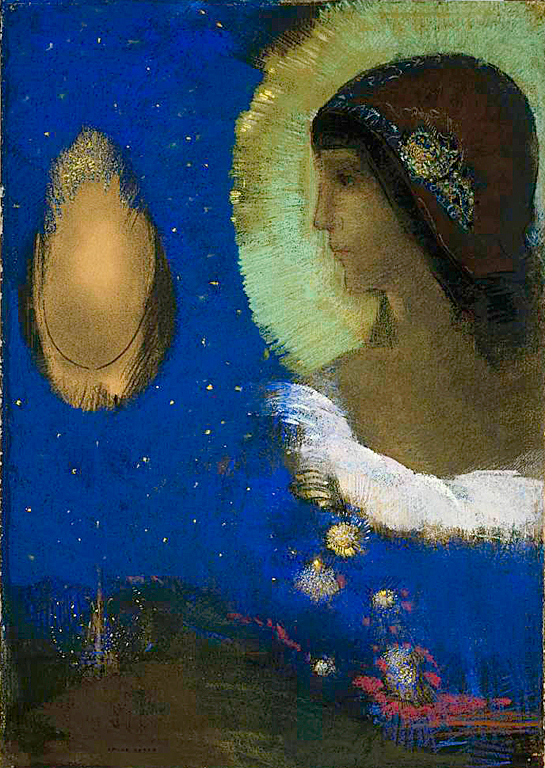
Odilon Redon, Sita, 1903

Pablo Picasso, 1904, Woman with a Helmet of Hair, gouache on tan wood pulp board

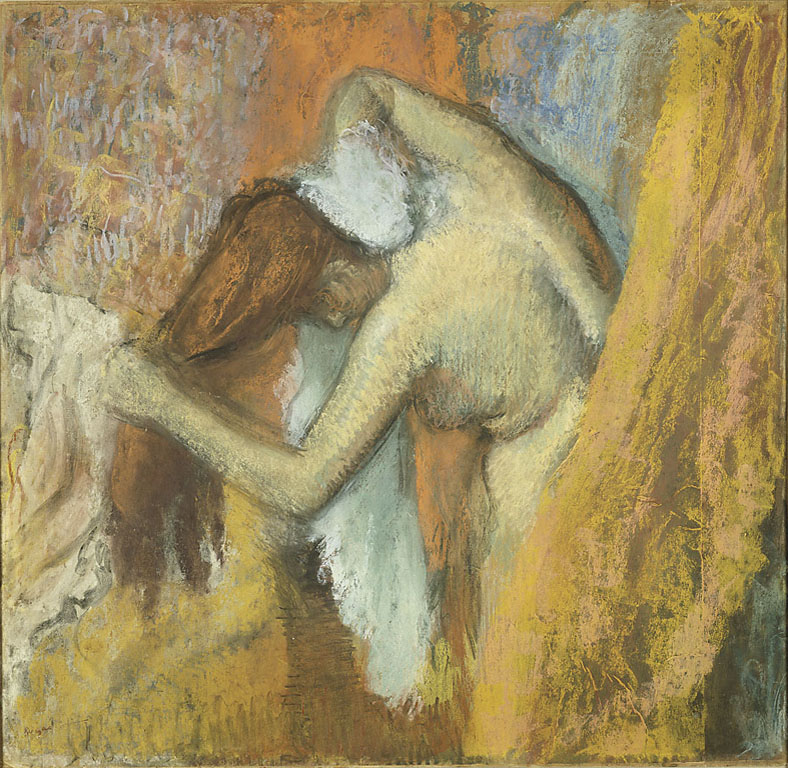
Edgar Degas, Woman at Her Toilette, c. 1900–1905

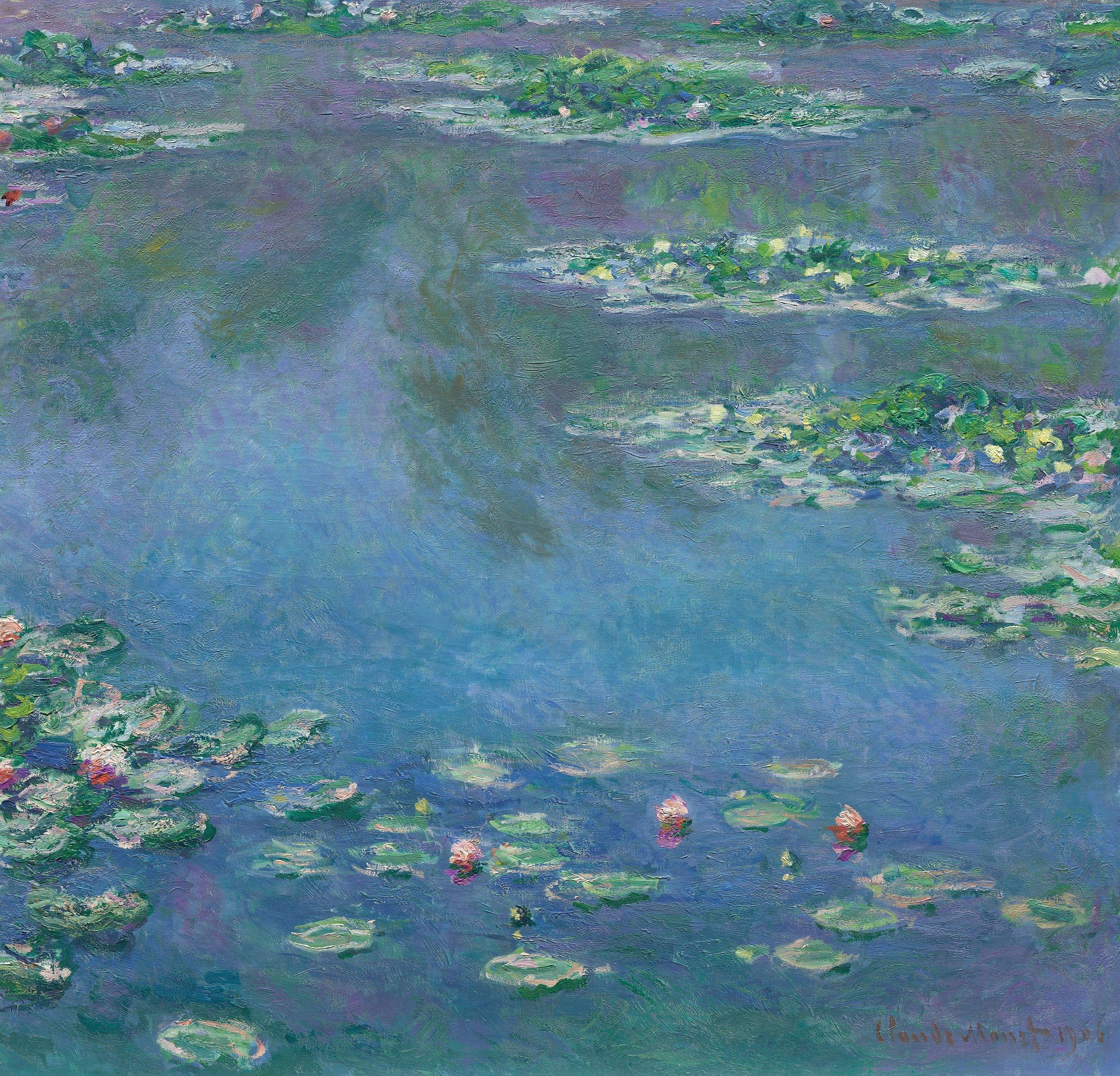
Claude Monet, Water Lilies, 1906

Pablo Picasso, 1909, Head of a Woman (Tête de femme)

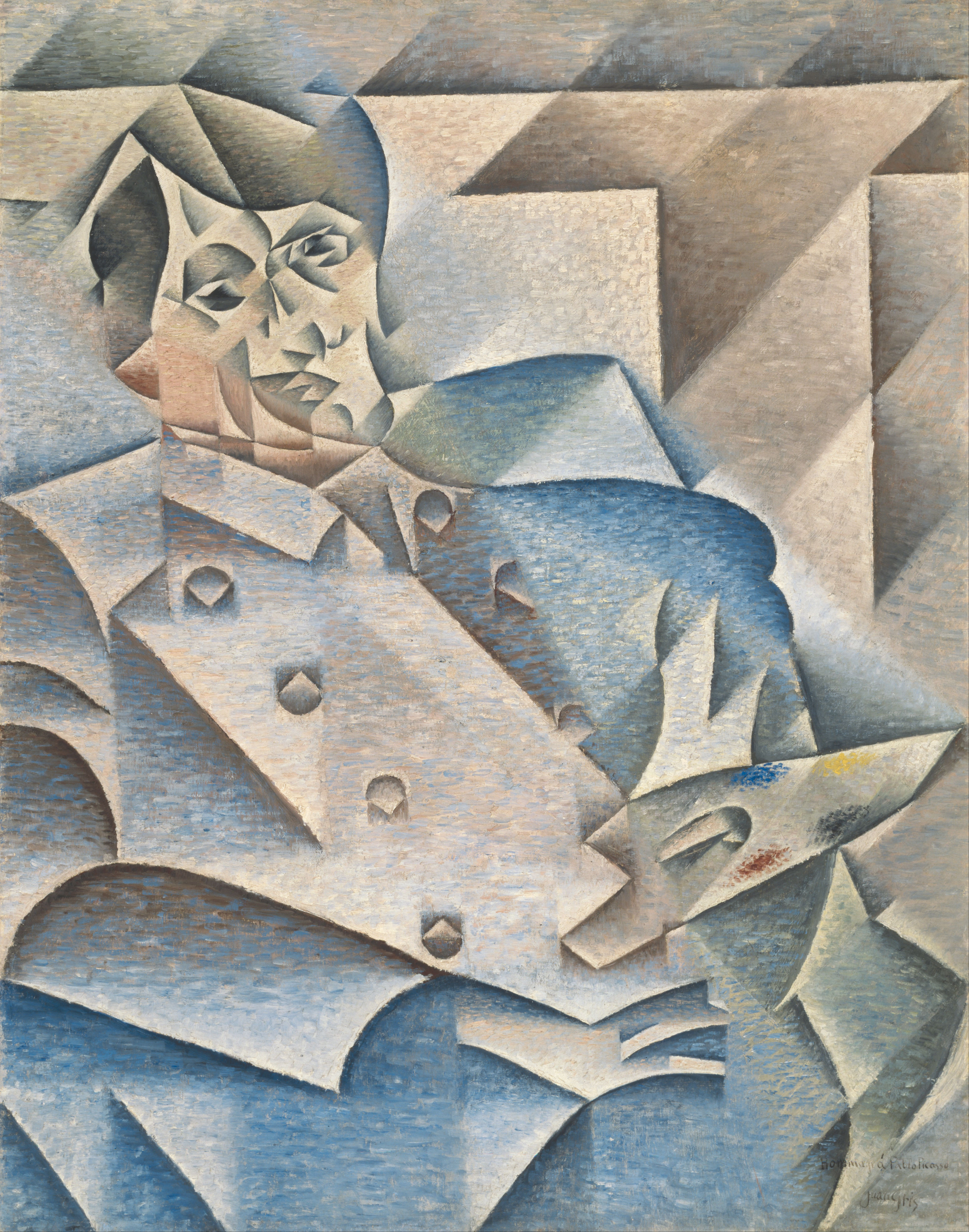
Juan Gris, Portrait of Picasso, 1912

Jean Metzinger, 1913, La Femme à l'Éventail (Woman with a Fan)

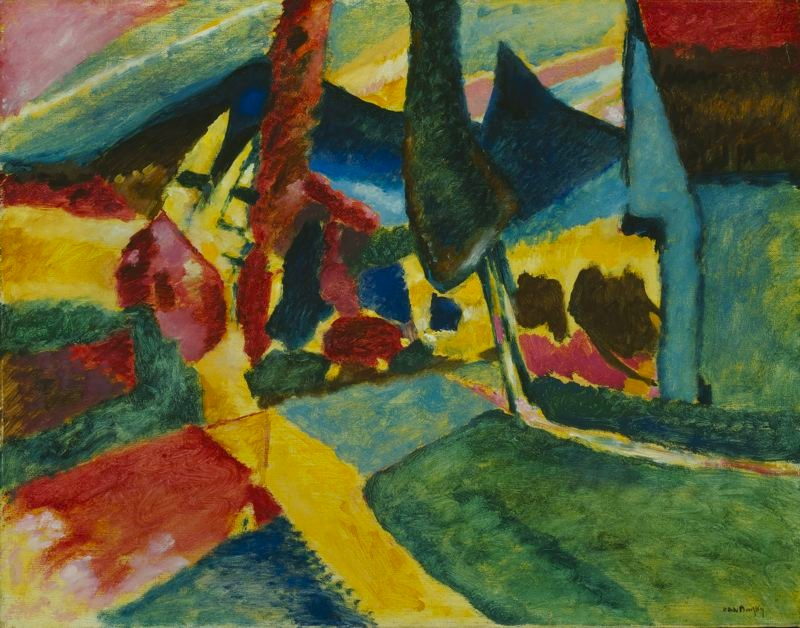
Wassily Kandinsky, 1912, Landscape With Two Poplars

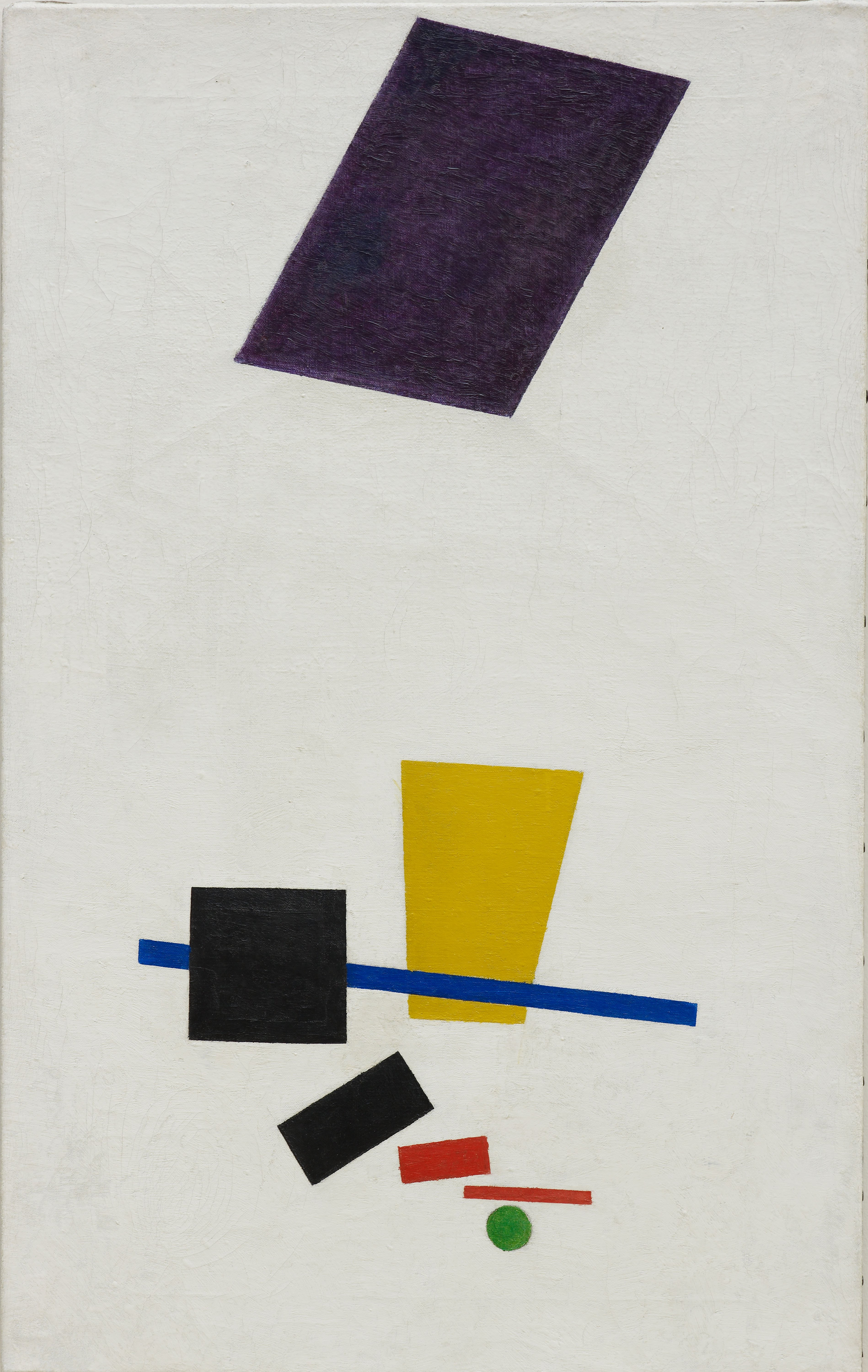
Kazimir Malevich, Painterly Realism of a Football Player—Color Masses in the 4th Dimension, 1915

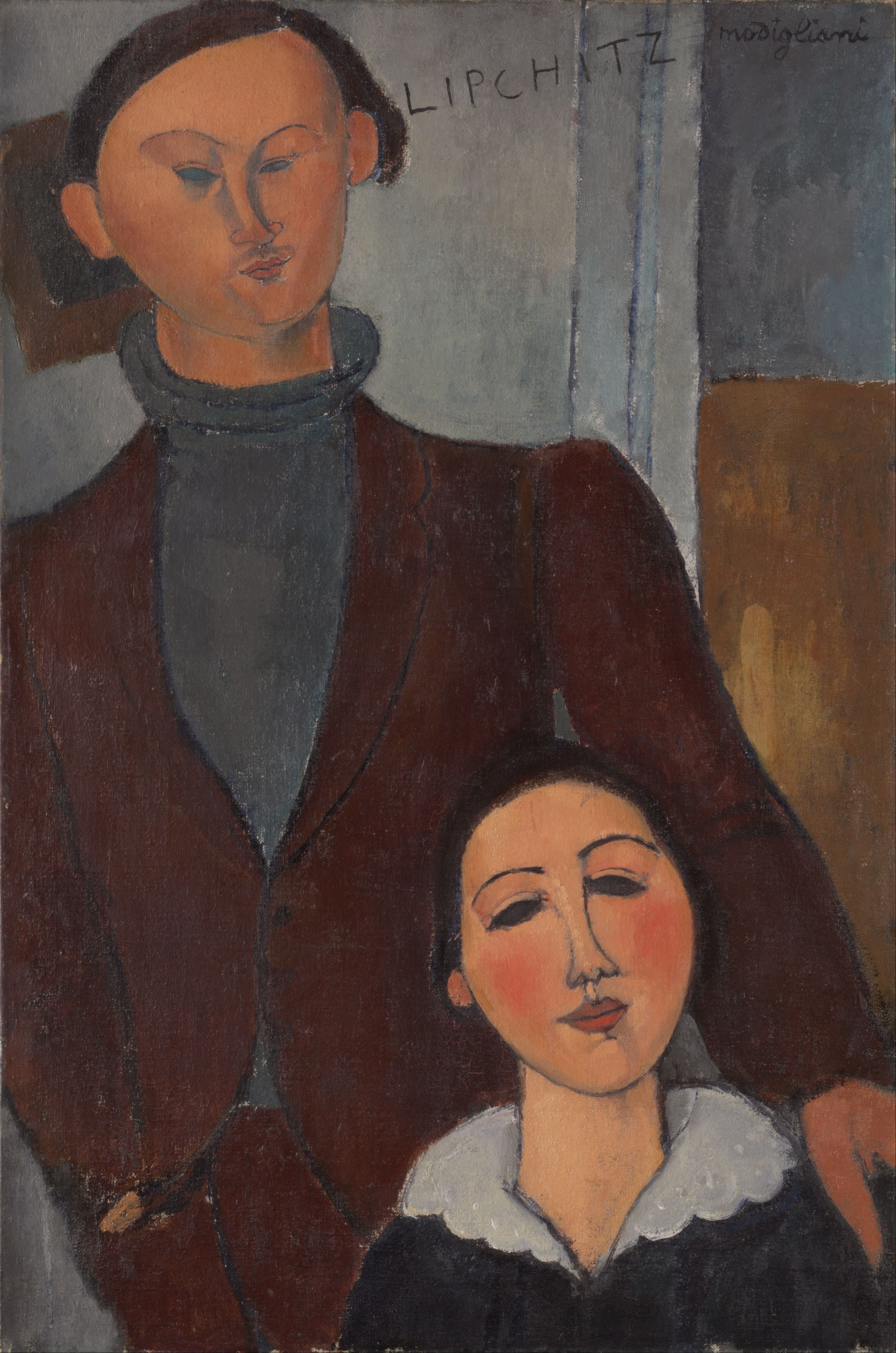
Amedeo Modigliani, Jacques and Berthe Lipchitz, 1916

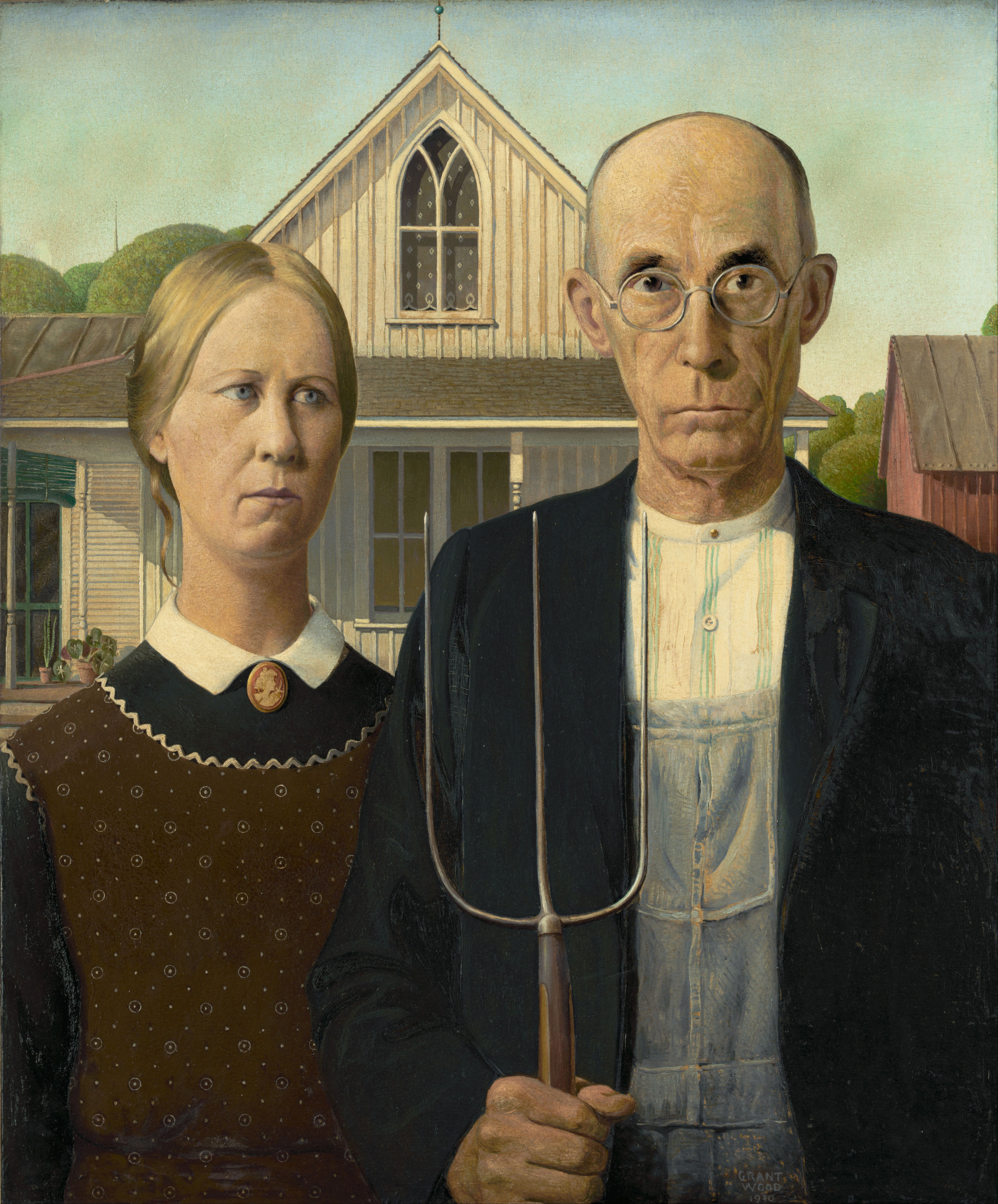
Grant Wood, American Gothic, 1930

=== Sculptures ===
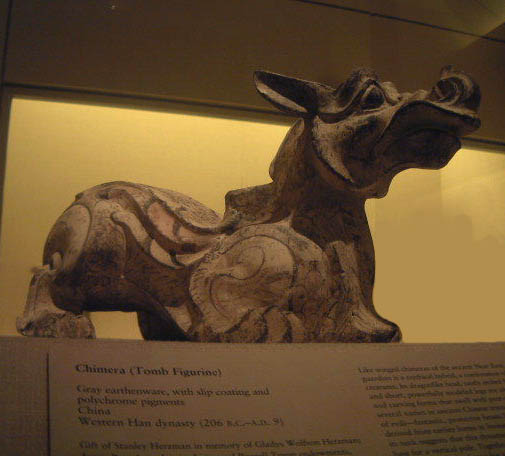
A Han dynasty (206 BC – 220 AD), tomb sculpture of a pixiu (or chimera) creature

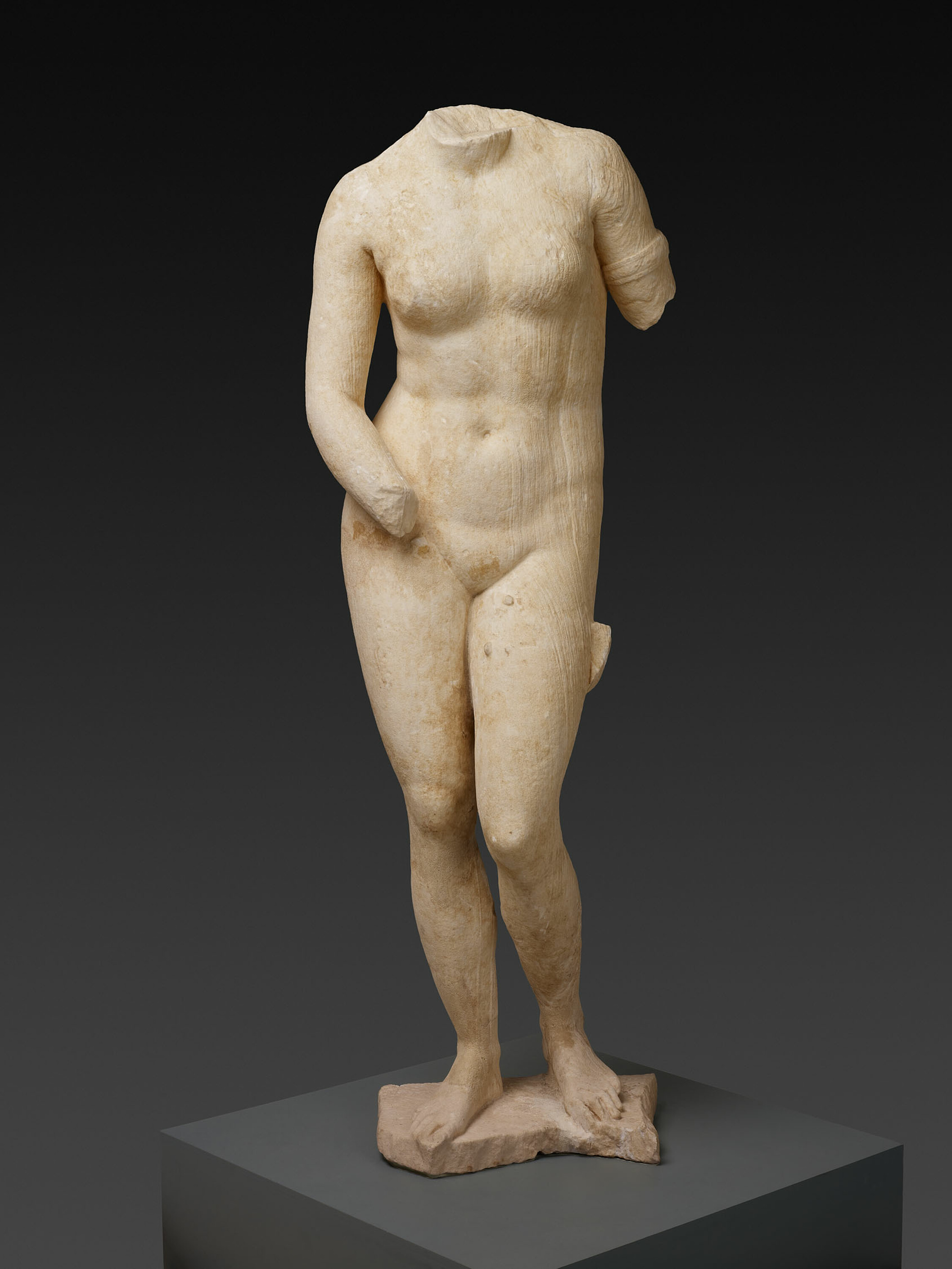
Aphrodite of Knidos, 2nd Century Roman, inspired by Praxiteles

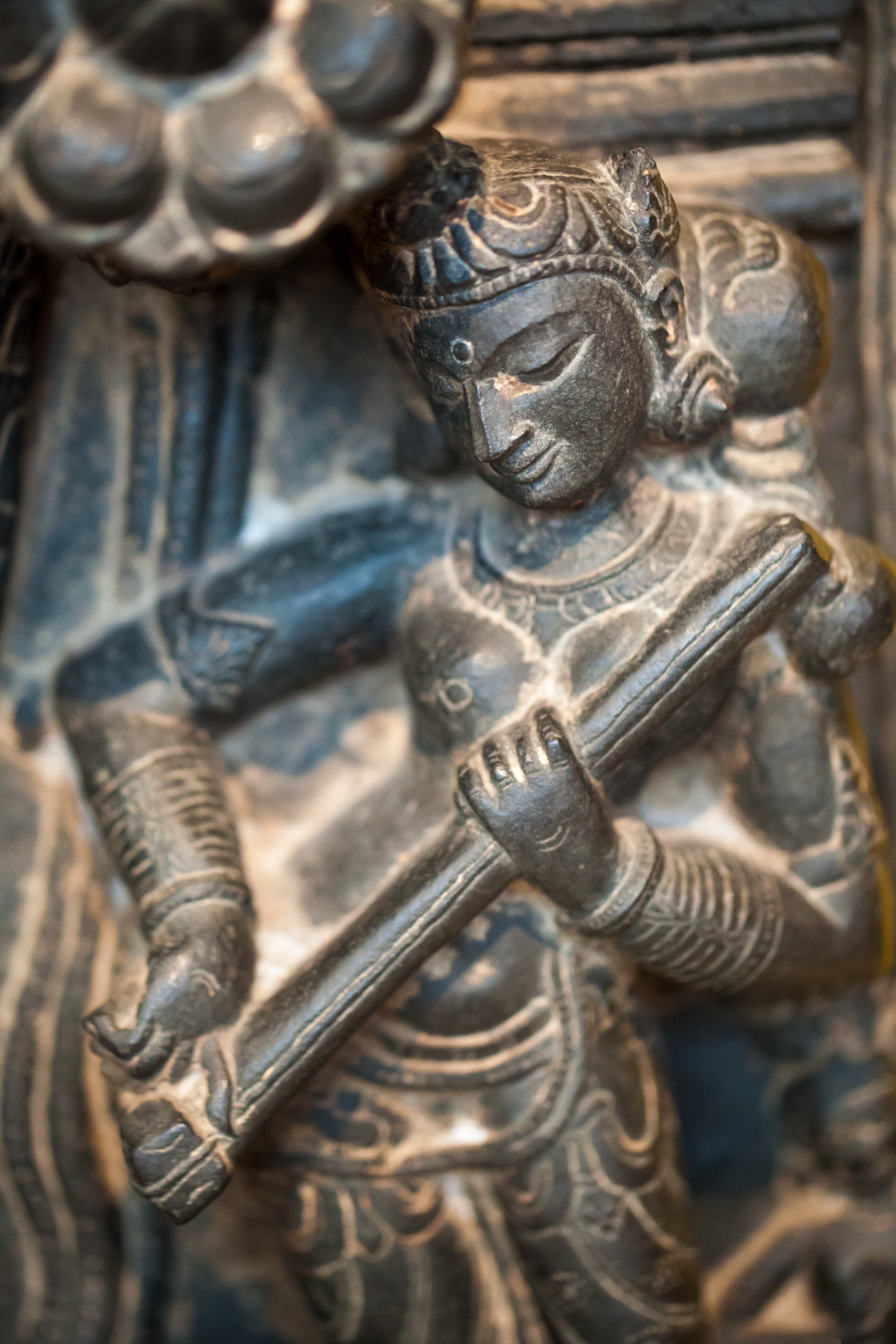
Saraswati playing an alapini vina, Bangladesh, Pala period 10th–12th century AD

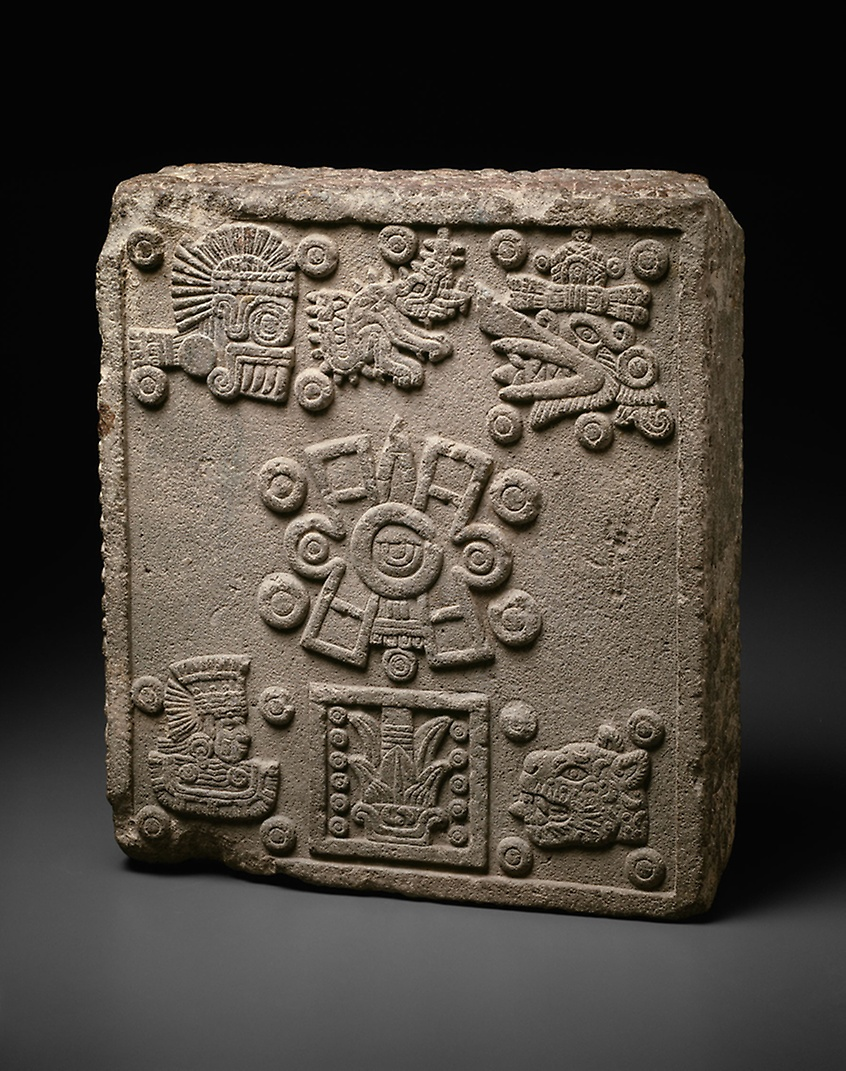
Aztec, Coronation Stone of Motecuhzoma II (Stone of the Five Suns) 1503

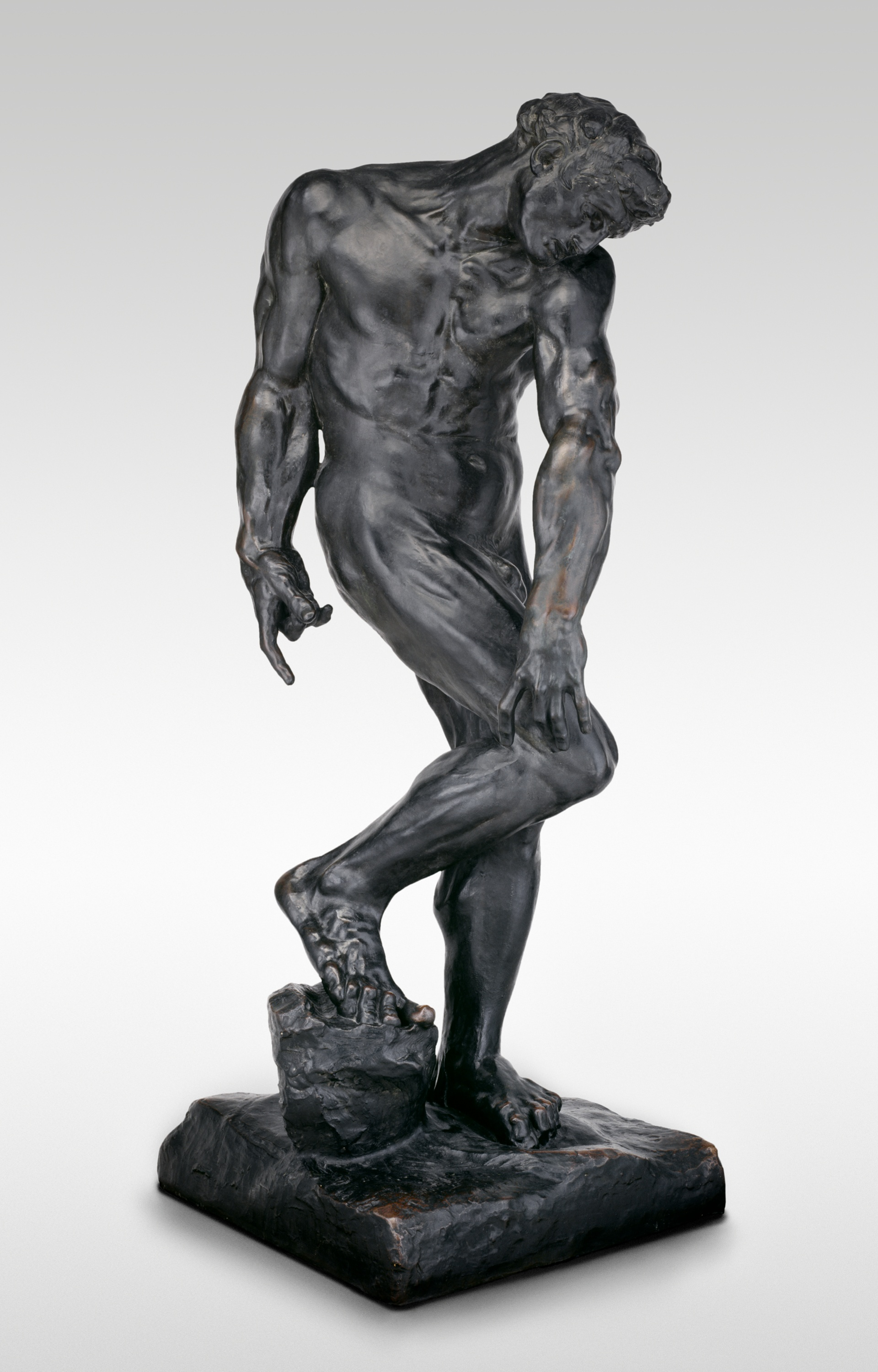
Auguste Rodin, Adam (1881) cast in bronze 1924

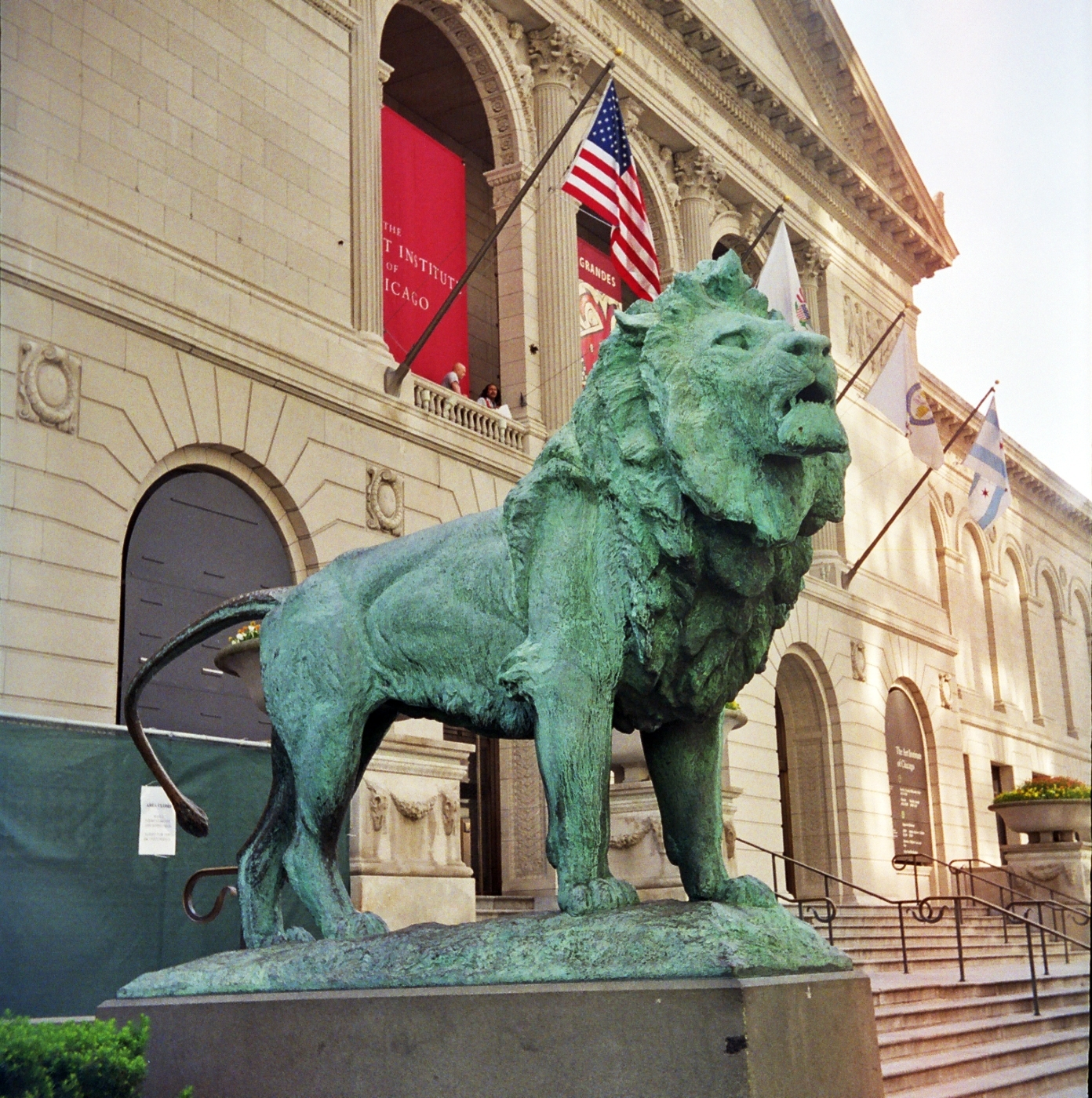
Edward Kemeys, Lions, 1893

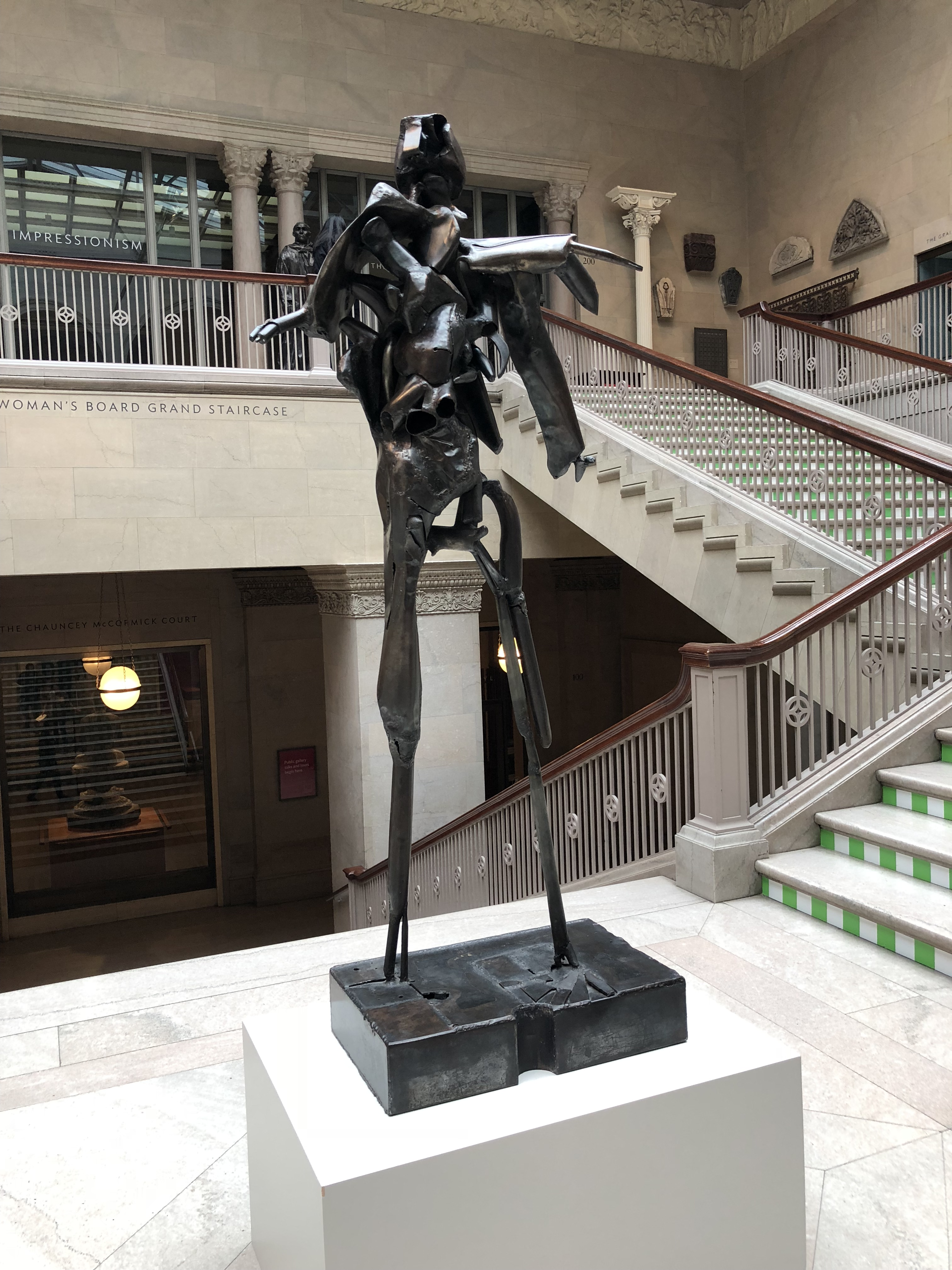
Richard Hunt, Hero Construction, 1958

Alexander Calder, Flying Dragon, 1975

=== More highlights from the collection ===
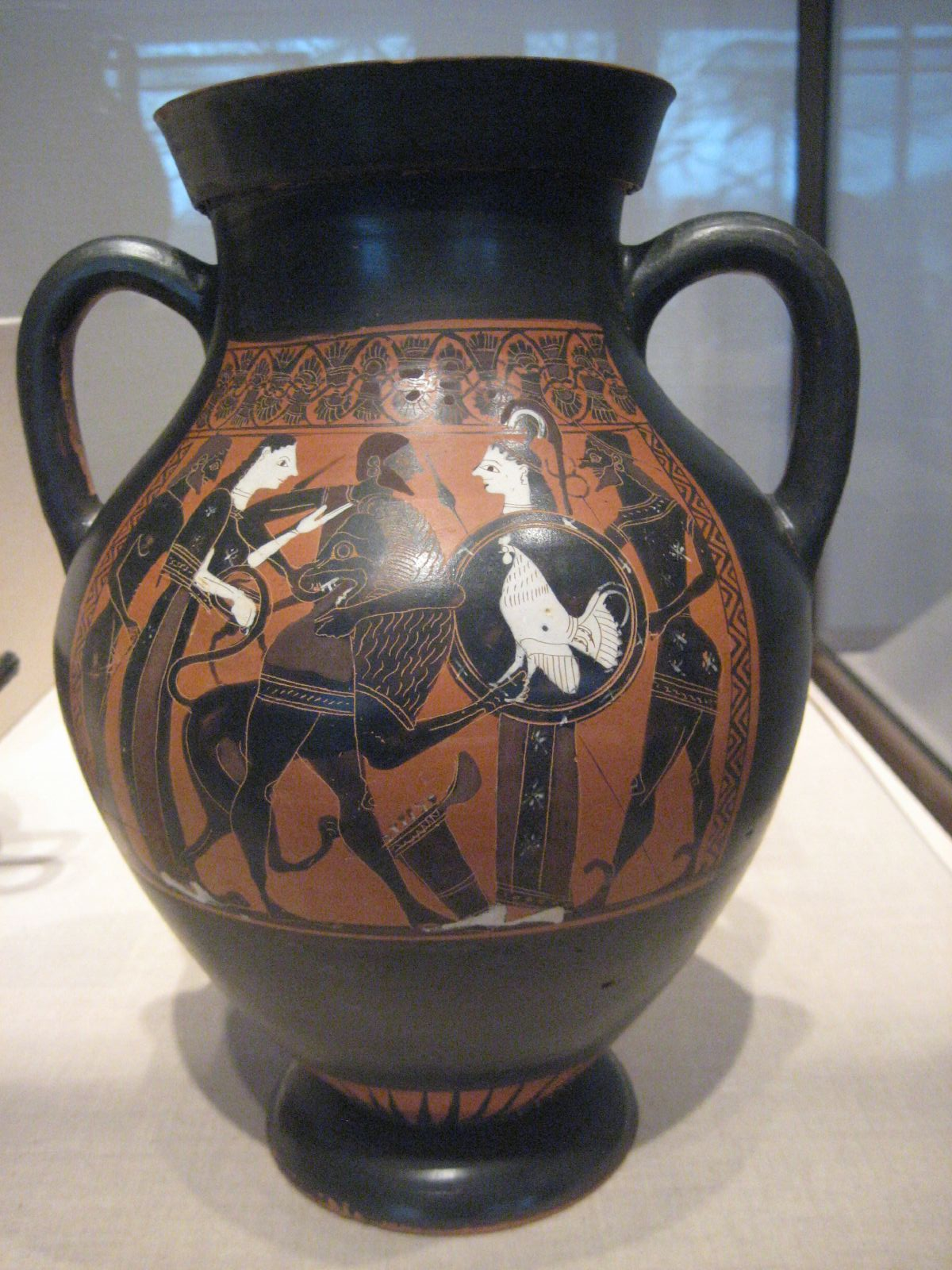
Ancient Greek Amphora depicts Herakles killing the Nemean Lion, with Iolaus and Nemea on the left and Athena and Hermes on the right. 550–525 BC.

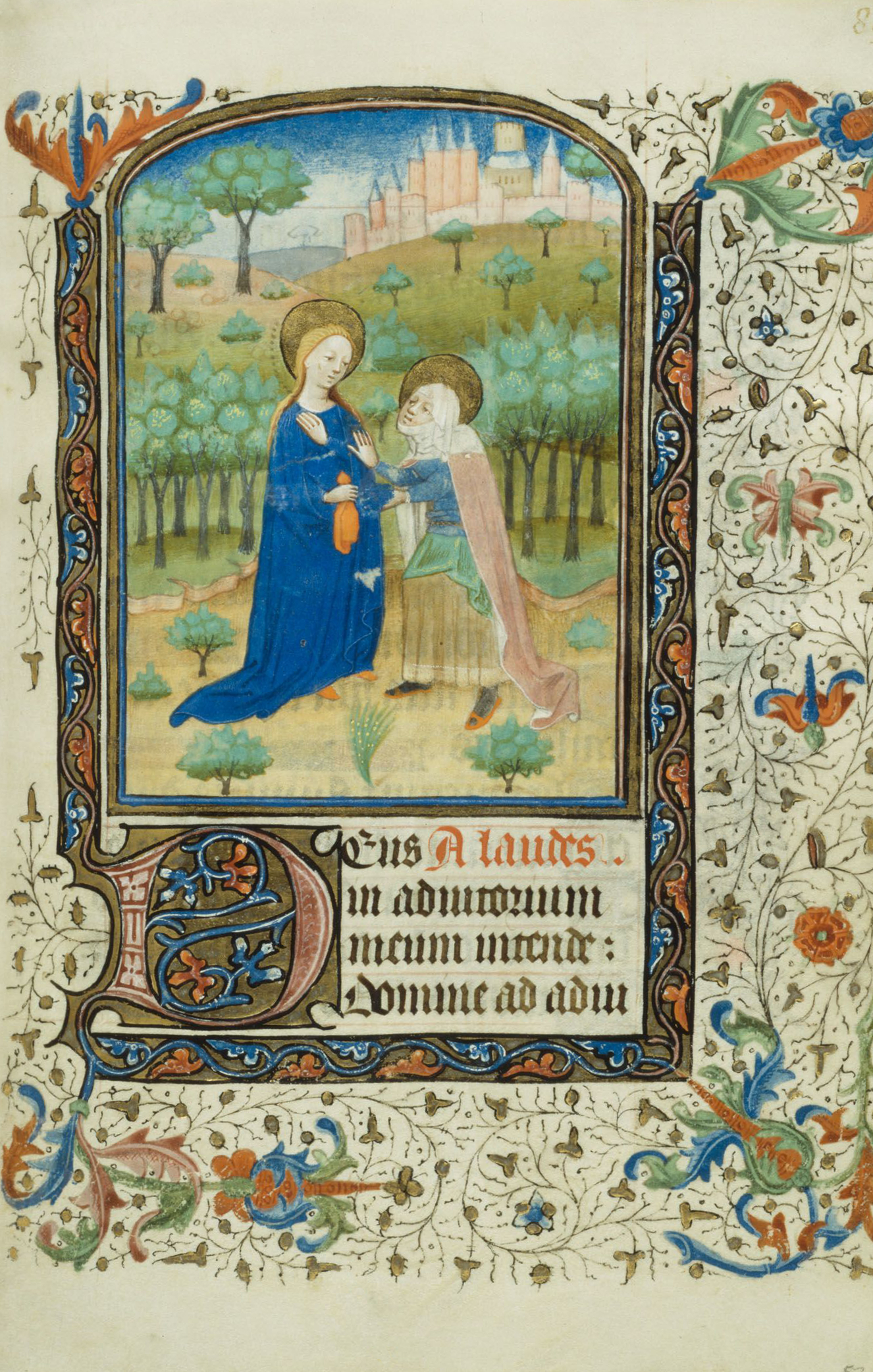
Illuminated Manuscript page from a Book of Hours, c. 1440/45

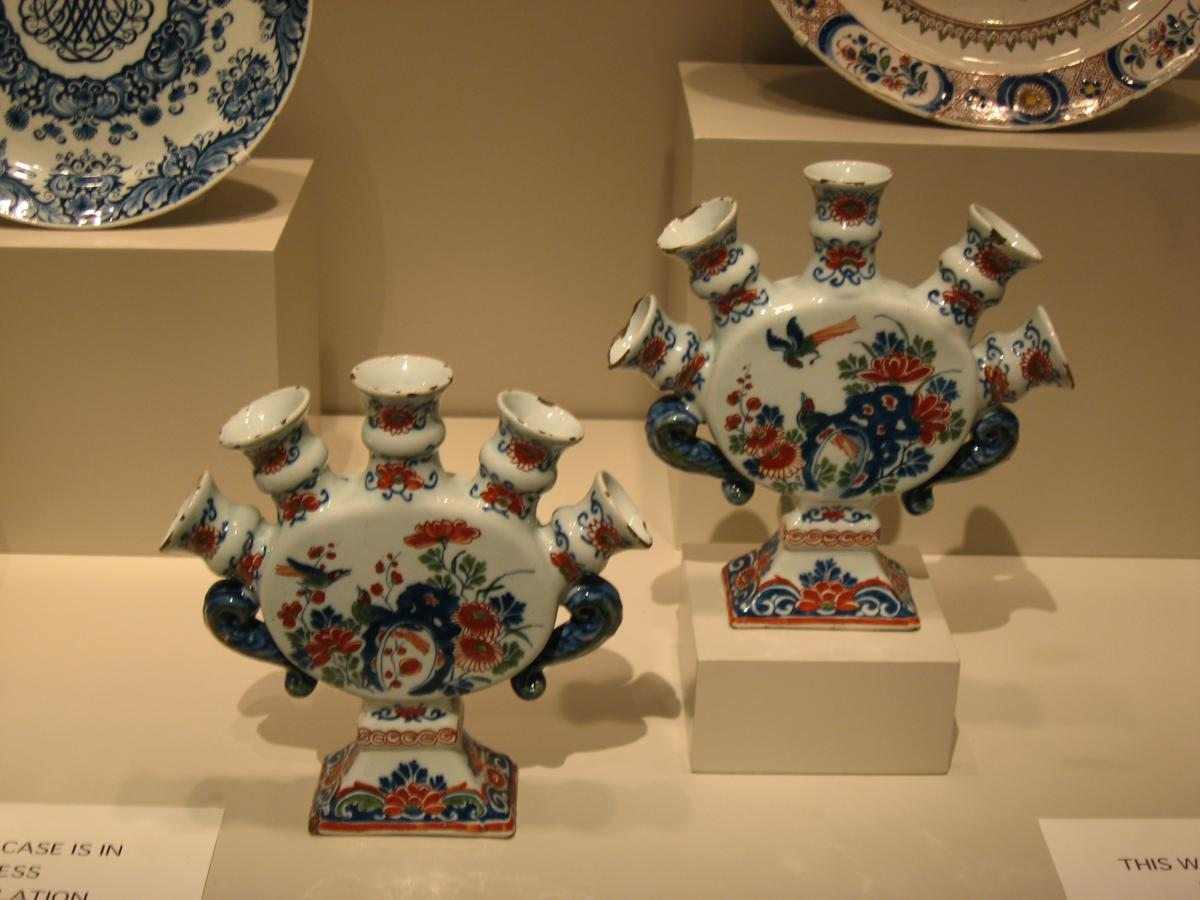
Pieces from the porcelain collection in the Art Institute of Chicago

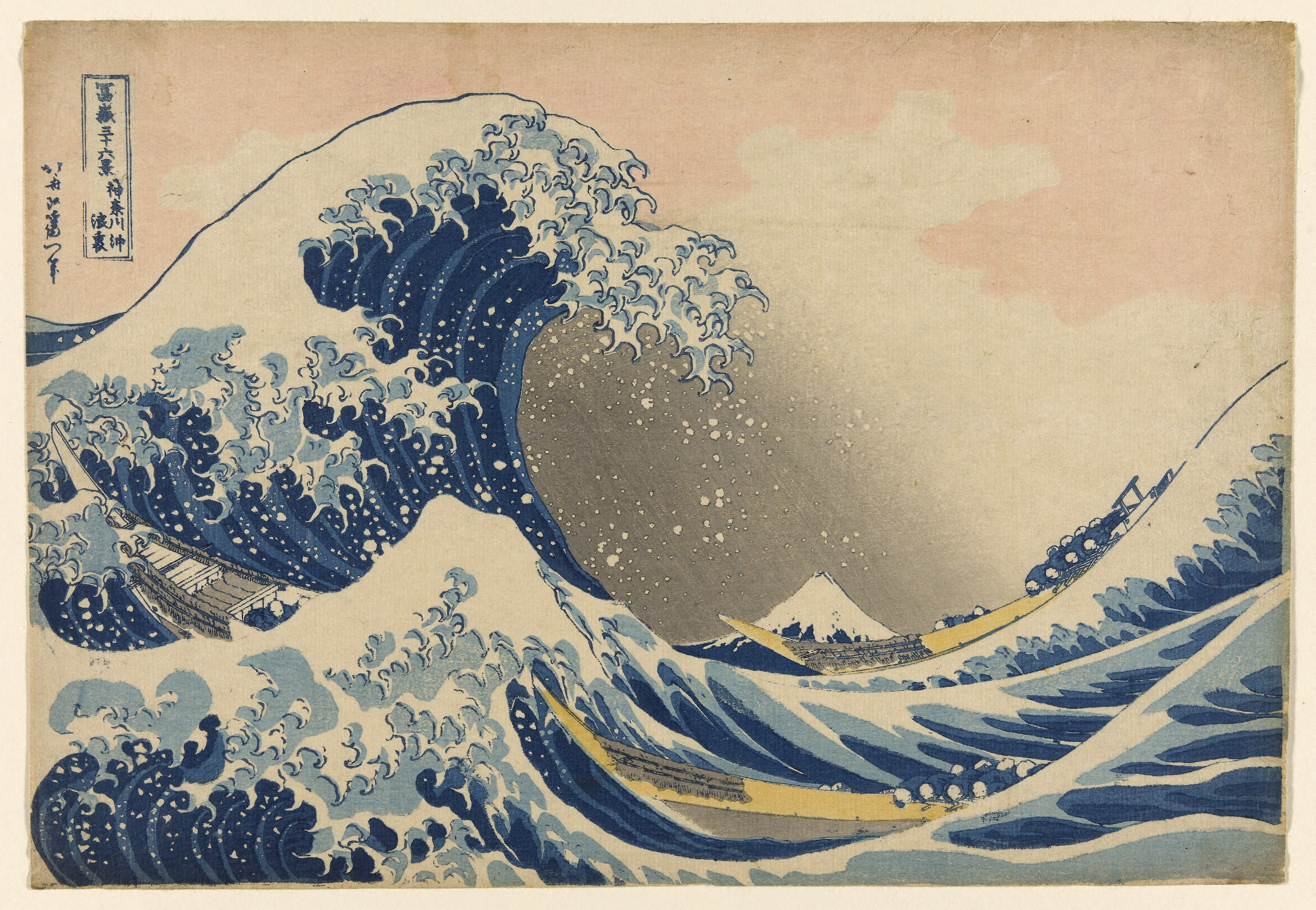
The Great Wave off Kanagawa (Under the Wave off Kanagawa) Japanese woodblock print by Hokusai, c. 1830 (this is one of three held by the museum)

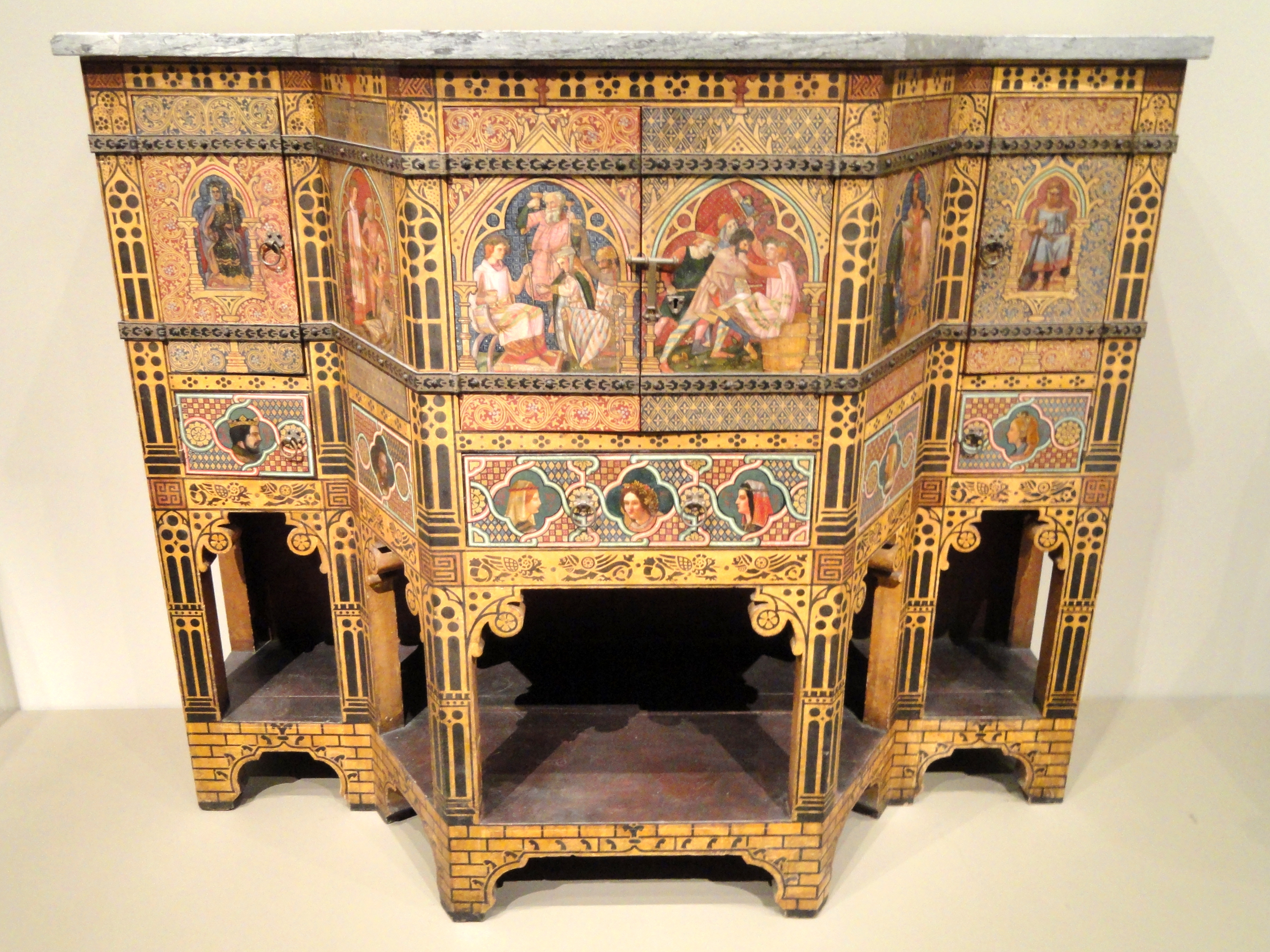
Sideboard and Wine Cabinet, 1859, designed by William Burges

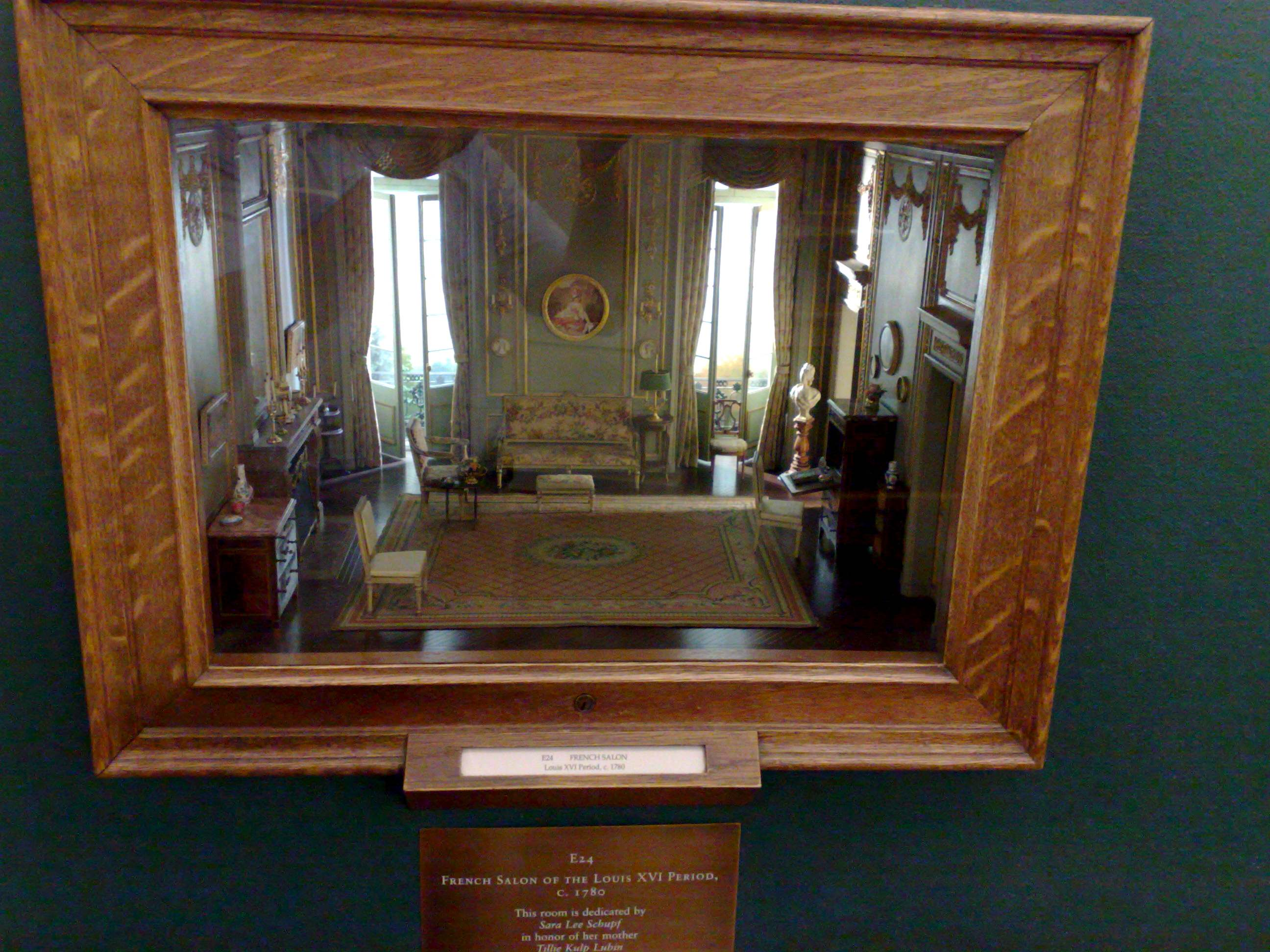
One of the Thorne Miniature Rooms, 'Salon Louis XVI' c. 1930s

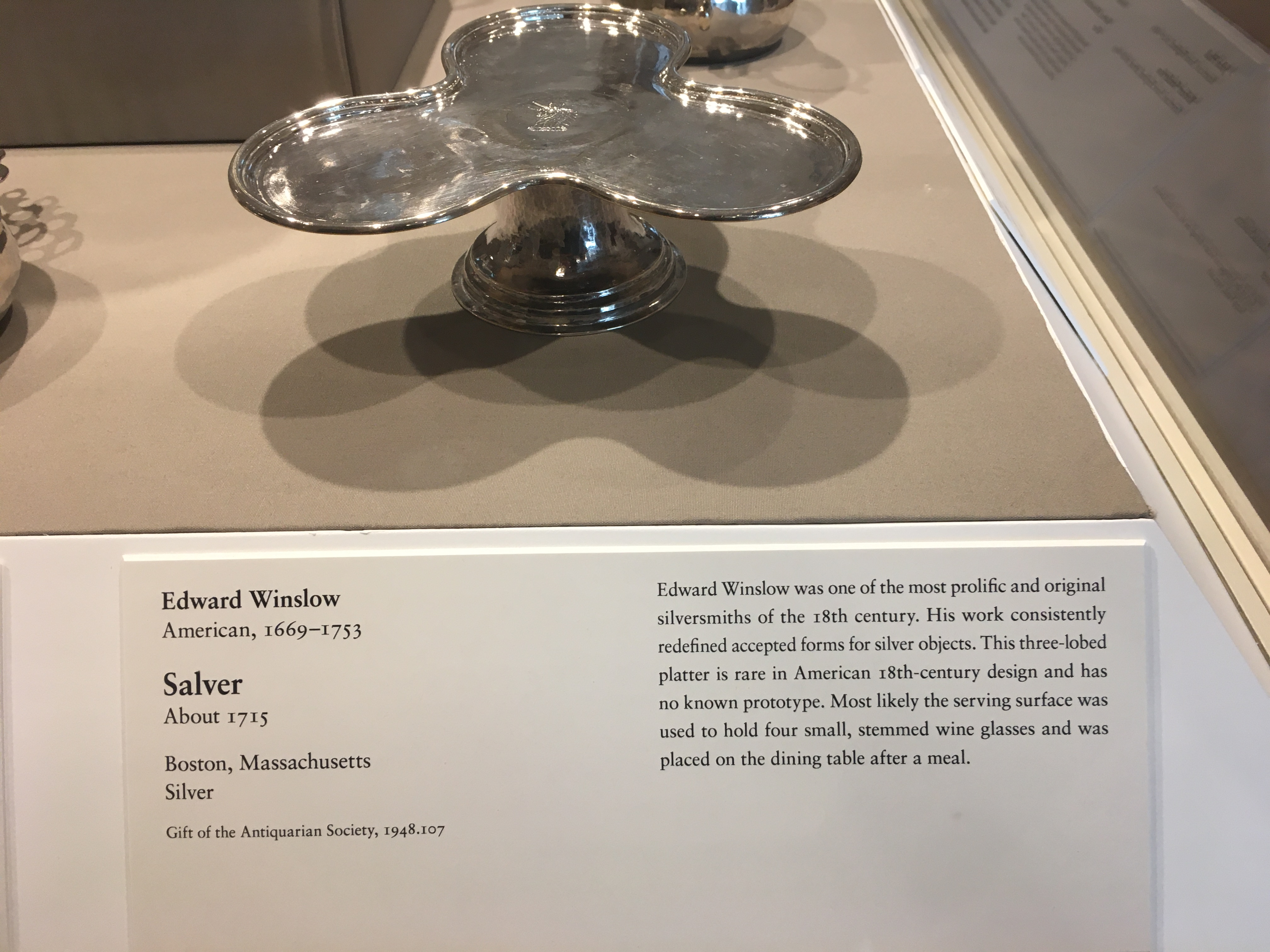
Silver Salver, Made by Edward Winslow, c. 1715

== Architecture ==
The Art Institute of Chicago, 1893

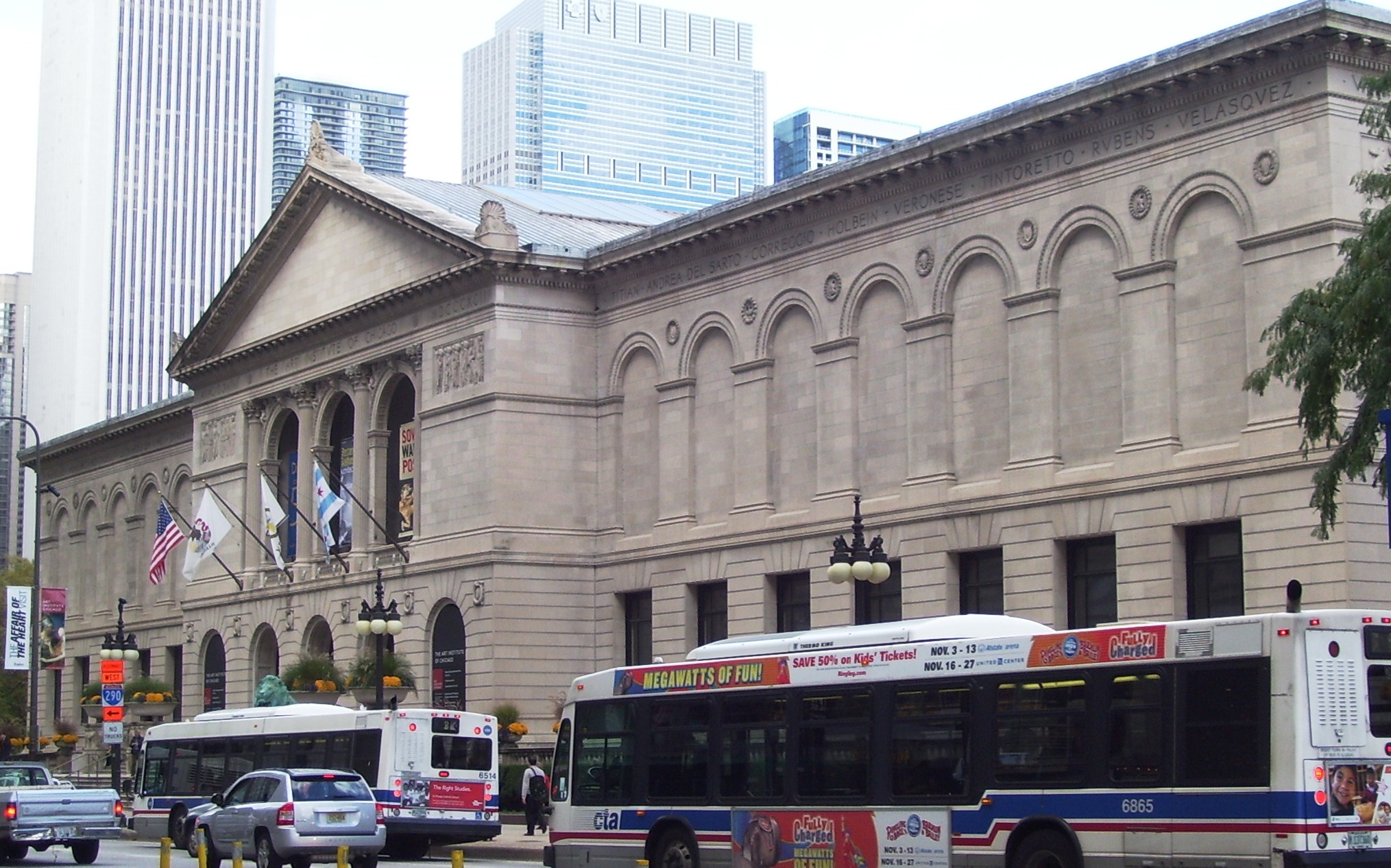
The Michigan Avenue facade in 2011

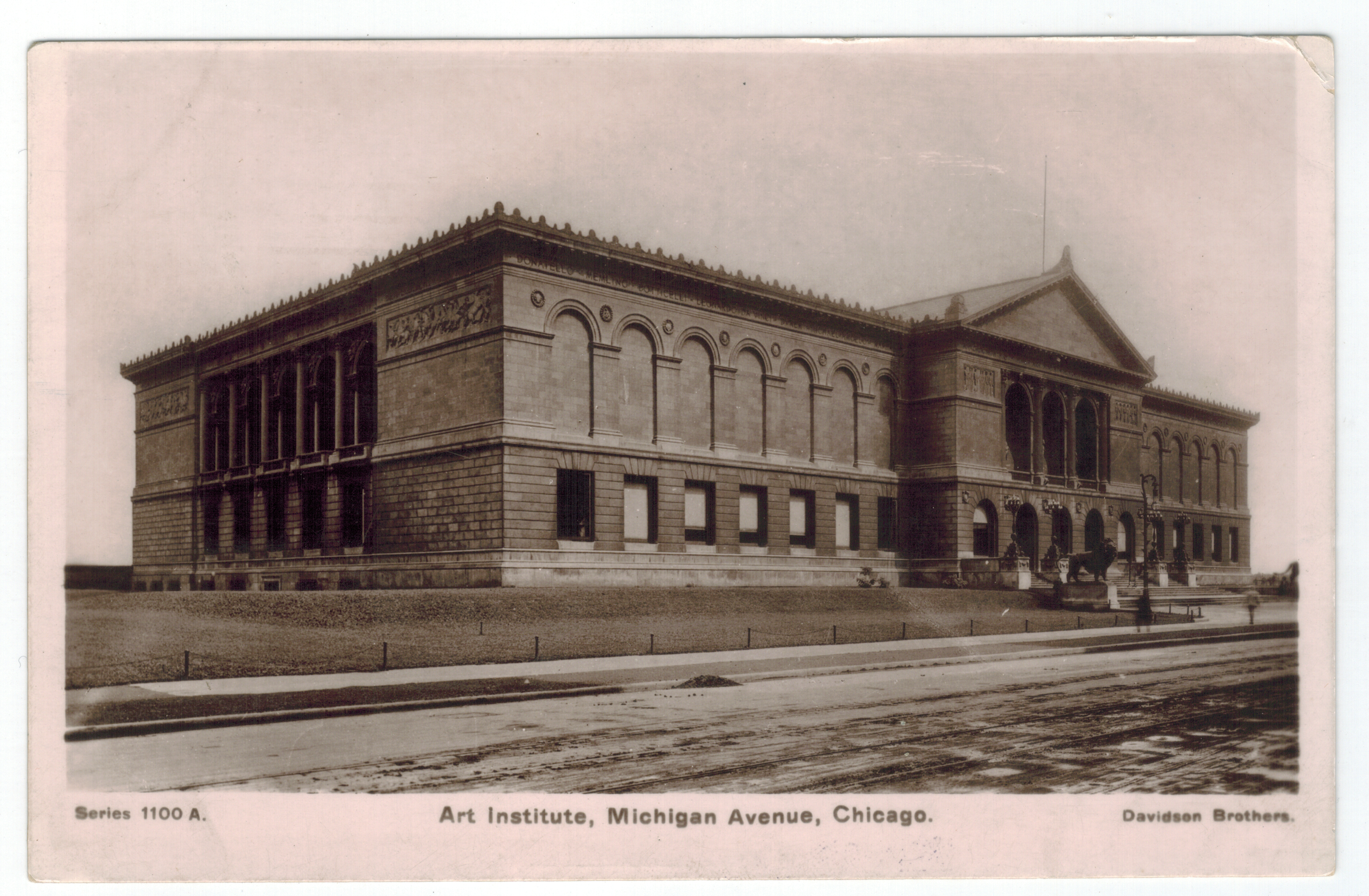
A 1907 postcard of the Art Institute

The current building complex at 111 South Michigan Avenue is the third address for the Art Institute. Situated in Grant Park, it was designed in the Beaux-Arts style by Shepley, Rutan and Coolidge of Boston to host national and international meetings held in conjunction with the 1893 World's Columbian Exposition, as the World's Congress Auxiliary Building, with the intent that the Art Institute occupy the space after the close of the fair.

The Art Institute's entrance on Michigan Avenue is guarded by two bronze lion statues created by Edward Kemeys. The lions were unveiled on May 10, 1894, each weighing more than two tons. The sculptor gave them unofficial names: the south lion "stands in an attitude of defiance", and the north lion is "on the prowl". When a Chicago sports team plays in the championships of their respective league (i.e. the Super Bowl or Stanley Cup Finals, not the entire playoffs), the lions are frequently dressed in that team's uniform. Evergreen wreaths are placed around their necks during the Christmas season.

The east entrance of the museum is marked by the stone arch entrance to the old Chicago Stock Exchange. Designed by Louis Sullivan in 1894, the Exchange was demolished in 1972, but salvaged portions of the original trading room were brought to the Art Institute and reconstructed.

The Art Institute building has the unusual property of straddling open-air railroad tracks. Two stories of gallery space connect the east and west buildings while the Metra Electric and South Shore lines operate below. The lower level of gallery space was formerly the windowless Gunsaulus hall, but is now home to the Alsdorf Galleries showcasing Indian, Southeast Asian and Himalayan Art. During renovation, windows facing north toward Millennium Park were added. The gallery space was designed by Renzo Piano in conjunction with his design of the Modern Wing and features the same window screening used there to protect the art from direct sunlight. The upper level formerly held the modern European galleries, but was renovated in 2008 and now features the Impressionist and Post-Impressionist galleries.

In September 2024, the museum announced a gift of $75 million for a new gallery building or wing named for benefactors Aaron I. Fleischman and Lin Lougheed. The gallery is intended to increase space for 19th century, modern, and contemporary art. The design and placement of the new gallery or gallery building are yet to be decided.

=== Libraries ===
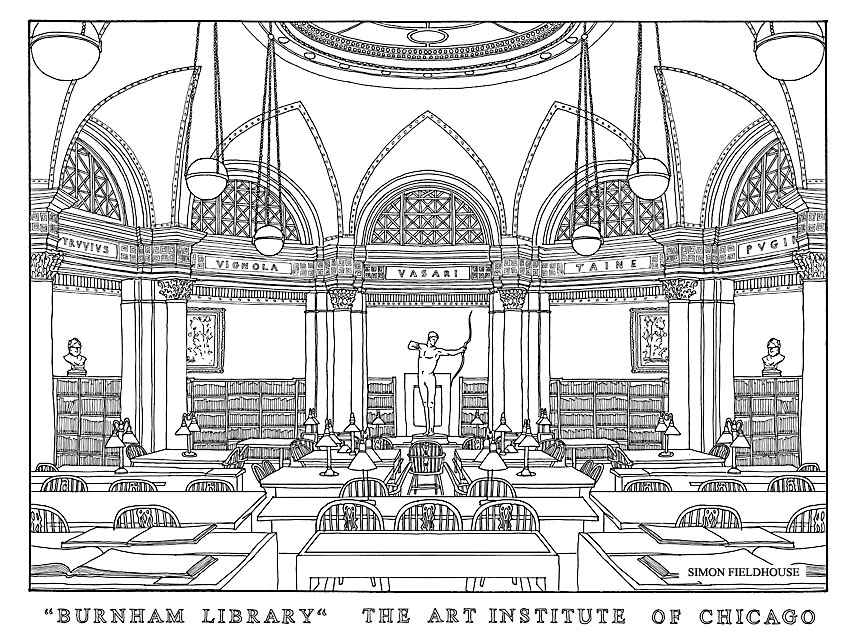
The Burnham Library, founded in 1912

Located on the ground floor of the museum is the Ryerson and Burnham Libraries. The Libraries' collections cover all periods of art, but is most known for its extensive collection of 18th to 20th century architecture. It serves the museum staff, college and university students, and is also open to the general public. The Friends of the Libraries, a support group for the Libraries, offers events and special tours for its members.

=== Modern Wing ===
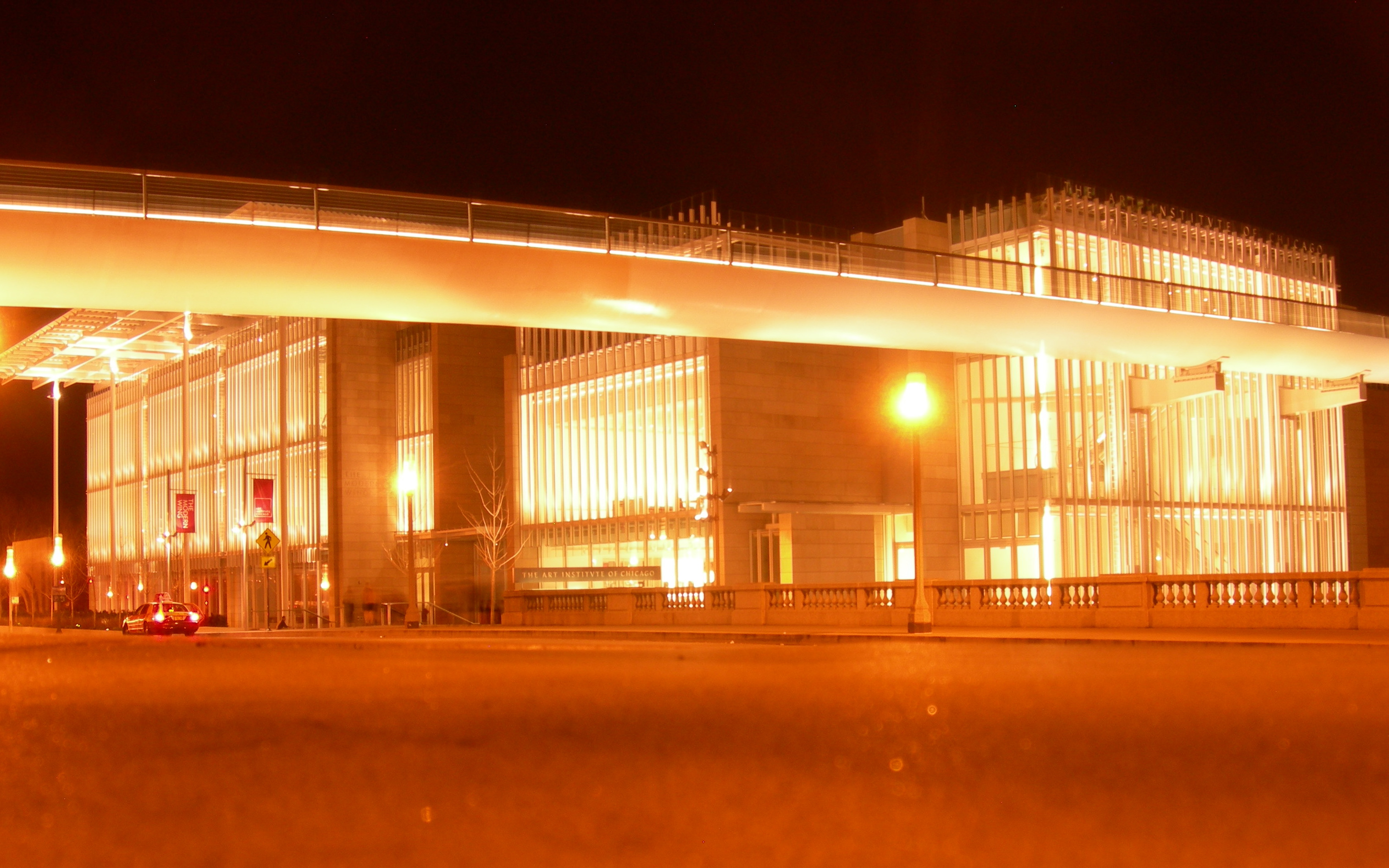
Art Institute of Chicago Modern Wing

On May 16, 2009, the Art Institute opened the Modern Wing, the largest expansion in the museum's history. The 264,000-square-foot (24,500 m^{2}) addition, designed by Renzo Piano, makes the Art Institute the second-largest museum in the US. The architect of record in the City of Chicago for this building was Interactive Design. The Modern Wing is home to the museum's collection of early 20th-century European art, including Pablo Picasso's The Old Guitarist, Henri Matisse's Bathers by a River, and René Magritte's Time Transfixed. The Lindy and Edwin Bergman Collection of Surrealist art includes the largest public display of Joseph Cornell's works (37 boxes and collages). The Wing also houses contemporary art from after 1960; new photography, video media, architecture and design galleries including original renderings by Frank Lloyd Wright, Ludwig Mies van der Rohe and Bruce Goff; temporary exhibition space; shops and classrooms; and a cafe. In addition, the Nichols Bridgeway connects a sculpture garden on the roof of the new wing with the adjacent Millennium Park to the north and a courtyard designed by Gustafson Guthrie Nichol.

In 2009, the Modern Wing won at the Chicago Innovation Awards.

== Governance ==
=== Directors ===
- William M. R. French (1885–1914)
- Newton Carpenter (1914–1916)
- George Eggers (1918–1921)
- Robert B. Harshe (1921–1938)
- Daniel Catton Rich (1938–1958)
- Allan McNab (1956–1965)
- Charles Cunningham (1965–1972)
- E. Laurence Chalmers (1972–1986)
- James N. Wood (1980–2004)
- James Cuno (2004–2011)
- Douglas Druick (2011–2016)
- James Rondeau (2016–present)

=== Attendance ===
During 2009, attendance was around 2 million—up 33 percent from 2008—in addition to a total of approximately 100,000 museum memberships. Despite a 25 percent boost in museum admission fees, the Modern Wing was a major catalyst for a rise in visitor traffic. In 2022, the museum welcomed 1.04 million visitors, an increase of 20 percent from 2021, but still well below 2018 attendance (before the COVID-19 pandemic). It was ranked tenth among the most-visited museums in the United States, and was the sixth most-visited U.S. art museum.

=== Finances ===
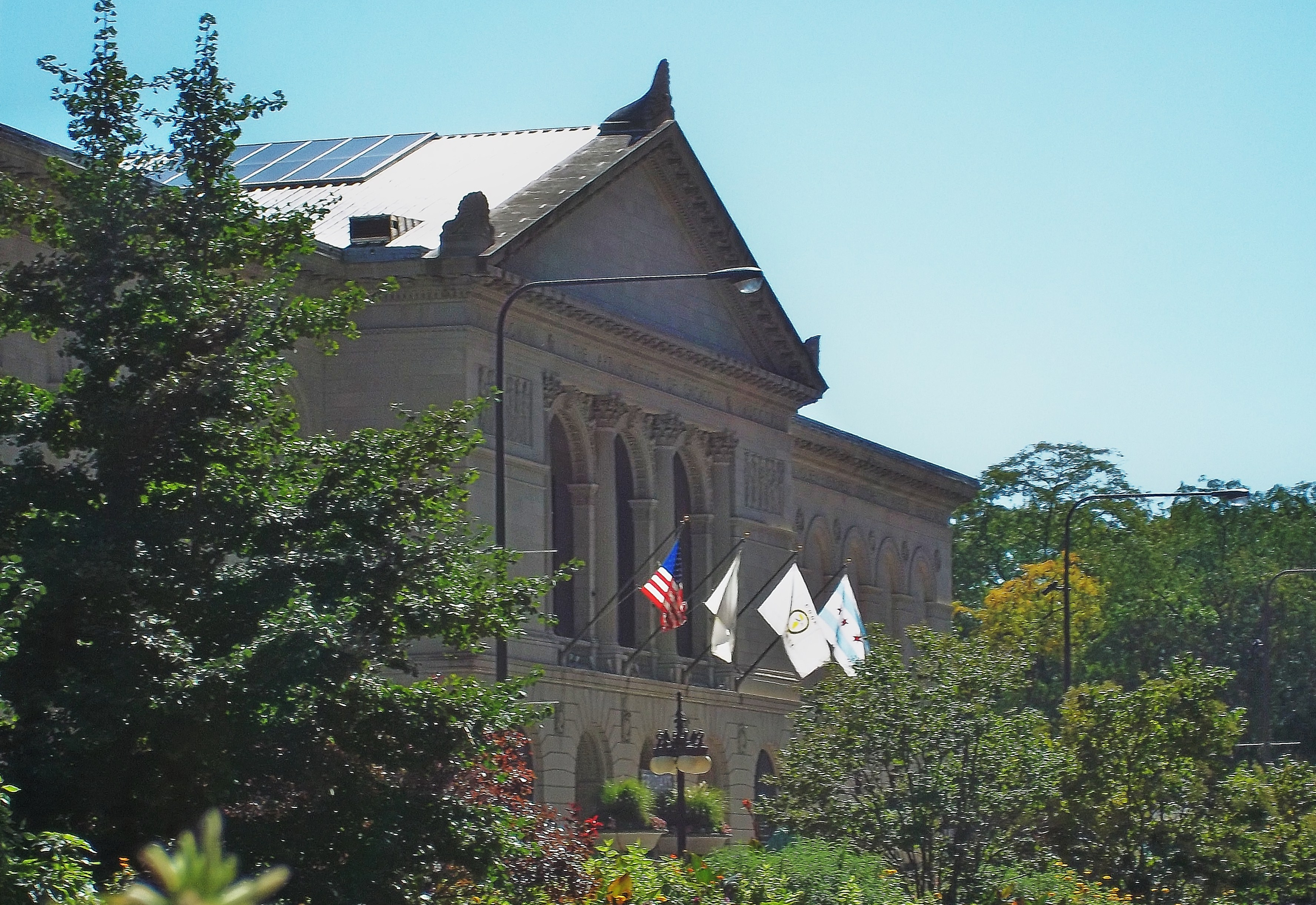
Art Institute of Chicago on Michigan Avenue

As of 2011, the Art Institute continues to rebuild its $783 million endowment since the recession. In June 2008, its endowment was $827 million. As of 2012, the museum is rated A1 by Moody's, its fifth-highest grade, in part reflecting the museum's pension and retirement liabilities; Standard & Poor's rates the museum A+, fifth-best. In October 2012, the Art Institute sold about $100 million of taxable and tax-exempt bonds partly to shore-up unfunded pension obligations.

The $294 million extension in 2009 was the culmination of a $385 million fundraising campaign—roughly $300 million for design and construction and $85 million for the endowment. Around $370 million were raised primarily from private patrons in Chicago. In 2011, the Art Institute received a $10 million gift from the Jaharis Family Foundation to renovate and expand galleries devoted to Greek, Roman and Byzantine art, and to support acquisitions and special exhibitions of that art. In 2016 the Art Institute received a $35 million gift from Dorothy Braude Edinburg, a longtime supporter.

=== Acquisitions and deaccessioning ===
In 1990, the Art Institute of Chicago sold 11 works at auction, including paintings by Claude Monet, Pablo Picasso, Amedeo Modigliani, Maurice Utrillo and Edgar Degas, to raise the $12 million purchase price of a bronze sculpture, Golden Bird, by Constantin Brâncuși. At the time, the sculpture was owned by the Arts Club of Chicago, which was selling it to buy a new gallery for its other works. In 2005, the museum sold two paintings by Marc Chagall and Pierre-Auguste Renoir at Sotheby's. In 2011, it auctioned two Picassos (Sur l'impériale traversant la Seine (1901) and Verre et pipe (1919)), Henri Matisse's Femme au fauteuil (1919), and Georges Braque's Nature morte à la guitare (rideaux rouge) (1938) at Christie's in London.

=== Controversies ===
==== Management of investments dispute ====
In 2002, the Art Institute of Chicago filed suit alleging fraud by a small Dallas firm called Integral Investment Management, along with related parties. The museum, which put $43 million of its endowment into funds run by the defendants, claimed that it faced losses of up to 90% on the investments after they soured.

==== Construction disputes ====
In 2010, the year after the opening of its massive Modern Wing, the Art Institute of Chicago sued the engineering firm Ove Arup for $10 million over what it said were flaws in the concrete floors and air-circulation systems. The suit was settled out of court.

==== Docent program diversity dispute ====
In 2021, the Art Institute ended its unpaid volunteer docents program to move to a paid model. The Chicago Tribune editorial page criticized the Institute's letter announcing the change and the move to a new model, arguing that "[o]nce you cut through the blather, the letter basically said the museum had looked critically at its corps of docents, a group dominated by mostly (but not entirely) white, retired women with some time to spare, and found them wanting as a demographic." The Chair of the Institute's Board of Trustees, Robert M. Levy, responded in a Tribune op-ed supporting the change, and described the Tribune's editorial as having "numerous inaccuracies and mischaracterizations", noted that the docent program had already been largely on pause for the past 15 months due to the COVID pandemic, and argued that the decision was not about anyone's identity, it was in keeping with changing modern museum practices around the world.

Following a volunteerism surge in the late 1940s, the program had been created in 1961 to revitalize and expand "programming for children." Among other matters, since 2014 the program had been trying to attract a more diverse socioeconomic perspective set of art-tour guides, given the unpaid time commitment needed.

==== Claims for Nazi-looted art and looted antiquities ====
In 1996, heirs to Jewish art collectors Louise and Friedrich Gutmann, who died in Nazi concentration camps, sued museum trustee Daniel Searle for the return of the Edgar Degas painting, Landscape with Smokestacks, which had been on loan to the Art Institute of Chicago. After years of litigation a settlement was concluded which involved the acquisition of the painting by the Art Institute. A collection of approximately 500 objects from Nepal, India, and elsewhere in Asia was donated to the Art Institute by trustee Marilynn Alsdorf in 1989; certain objects from this collection have been contested.

In 2000, the Art Institute reached a settlement agreement with the heirs of Federico Gentili Di Giuseppe concerning a restitution claim for a 17th century sculpture by Francesco Mochi. In 2001, the heirs of Holocaust victim Max Silberberg reached a settlement agreement concerning Gustave Courbet's The Rock in Hautepierre. The Art Institute had acquired the Courbet from the dealer Paul Rosenberg in 1967. In 2023, the Manhattan District Attorney's Office moved to seize several Egon Schiele paintings from several museums on the grounds that they had been looted by the Nazis from Fritz Grünbaum, who was killed in the Holocaust. The paintings included Russian War Prisoner, a watercolor in the Art Institute. The Art Institute continues to hold the work, as it is contesting the seizure in court. According to its investigation, it acquired the watercolor drawing in 1966 from an American art dealer through a proper provenance from Grünbaum's legal heir, and it also argues that the claim is time-barred because Grünbaum's heirs were aware. In February 2024, the Manhattan District Attorney filed a motion accusing the Art Institute of "ignoring evidence of an elaborate fraud undertaken to conceal that the artwork had been looted". According to The New York Times, the court filing provided detailed evidence that provenance documents provided by the Swiss art dealer Eberhard W. Kornfeld contained forged signatures or were altered long after he came into possession of the paintings and sold them to other art dealers in the mid-1950s; however, the Art Institute disputed this claim. Court hearings on the matter took place in 2024. In 2026, The New York appellate court vacated the seizure order, holding that the matter of disputed ownership needed to addressed in a civil court.

== Provenance research and returns ==
The Art Institute of Chicago created a dedicated Provenance Research Department in 2020 to conduct provenance research across the entire collection, as well as for acquisitions and loans. In 2024, Jacques Schumacher was recruited to lead the provenance team.

=== Thai pilaster ===
In June 2024, the Art Institute of Chicago returned a 12th-century sandstone pilaster to Thailand. The artifact, depicting the Hindu deity Krishna lifting Mount Govardhana, was originally acquired by the museum in 1967 and believed to be from Angkor, Cambodia. However, provenance research determined that it originated from the Phanom Rung temple in northeastern Thailand. This discovery led to discussions with Thai authorities and the subsequent repatriation of the piece.

=== Buddha Sheltered by the Serpent King Muchalinda ===
On March 3, 2025, the Art Institute of Chicago announced that it had returned a 12th-century Nepali sculpture, Buddha Sheltered by the Serpent King Muchalinda, to the government of Nepal after provenance research confirmed it had been stolen from Guita Bahi in the Kathmandu Valley. The sculpture, carved from schist, had been on display at the museum since 1997.

== In popular culture ==
=== Ferris Bueller's Day Off ===
In Ferris Bueller's Day Off (1986), the Art Institute of Chicago scene is a quiet, contemplative moment in an otherwise fast-paced film. Ferris Bueller (Matthew Broderick), his girlfriend Sloane Peterson (Mia Sara), and his best friend Cameron Frye (Alan Ruck) visit the museum during their day of adventure in Chicago.

Set to The Dream Academy's instrumental cover of Please Please Please Let Me Get What I Want, the sequence showcases some of the museum's most famous artworks. The trio walks hand in hand through the museum's grand halls before pausing to admire iconic pieces. Ferris and Sloane share a tender moment in front of Marc Chagall's America Windows, while Cameron becomes mesmerized by Georges Seurat's A Sunday on La Grande Jette. As the camera zooms in on the small painted dots, Cameron's gaze intensifies, reflecting his growing existential crisis.

The scene, devoid of dialogue, serves as a moment of reflection. Ferris and Sloane embrace, reinforcing their carefree love, while Cameron, often plagued by self-doubt, appears lost in thought. His fixation on the Seurat painting subtly foreshadows his later emotional breakdown.

Director John Hughes, a Chicago native, has said this sequence was a love letter to the museum, emphasizing art's ability to move and transform individuals. The scene stands out in the film for its quiet beauty, offering a moment of introspection amid the comedic chaos of Ferris's day off.

Hughes's commentary on the sequence was used as a reference point by journalist Hadley Freeman in a discussion of the Republican presidential primary candidates in 2011.

=== Masterpiece ===
The 1970 Parker Brothers board game Masterpiece features paintings from the Art Institute of Chicago's collection. The game, designed for players to bid on and trade famous artworks while attempting to avoid forgeries, includes reproductions of several iconic works housed in the museum. Notable paintings featured in the game include Georges Seurat's A Sunday on La Grande Jatte, Vincent van Gogh's The Bedroom, and Grant Wood's American Gothic.

The game was one of the first major board games to introduce fine art to a mainstream audience in an interactive format. By using real paintings from the Art Institute's collection, Masterpiece played a role in exposing a broader public to well-known artworks. The game remains a nostalgic classic and has been reissued multiple times with different artwork selections, but the original 1970 edition is closely associated with the Art Institute of Chicago's holdings.

== See also ==
- American Academy of Art College
- Bessie Bennett, early 20th century Curator of Decorative Art
- Forest Idyl
- List of largest art museums
- List of most-visited museums in the United States
- List of museums and cultural institutions in Chicago
- Aimé Leon Meyvis
- Visual arts of Chicago
- Lions (Kemeys)
