= Metzler Orgelbau =

Metzler Orgelbau, a firm of organ builders founded in 1890 and based since 1933 in Dietikon, near Zurich in Switzerland, is one of the most important makers of the European classical organ revival and has built many important and respected instruments throughout Europe. Its instruments include:

- Belgium
  - The east-end organ at Antwerp Cathedral
- Spain
  - The main organ of the Abbey of Poblet

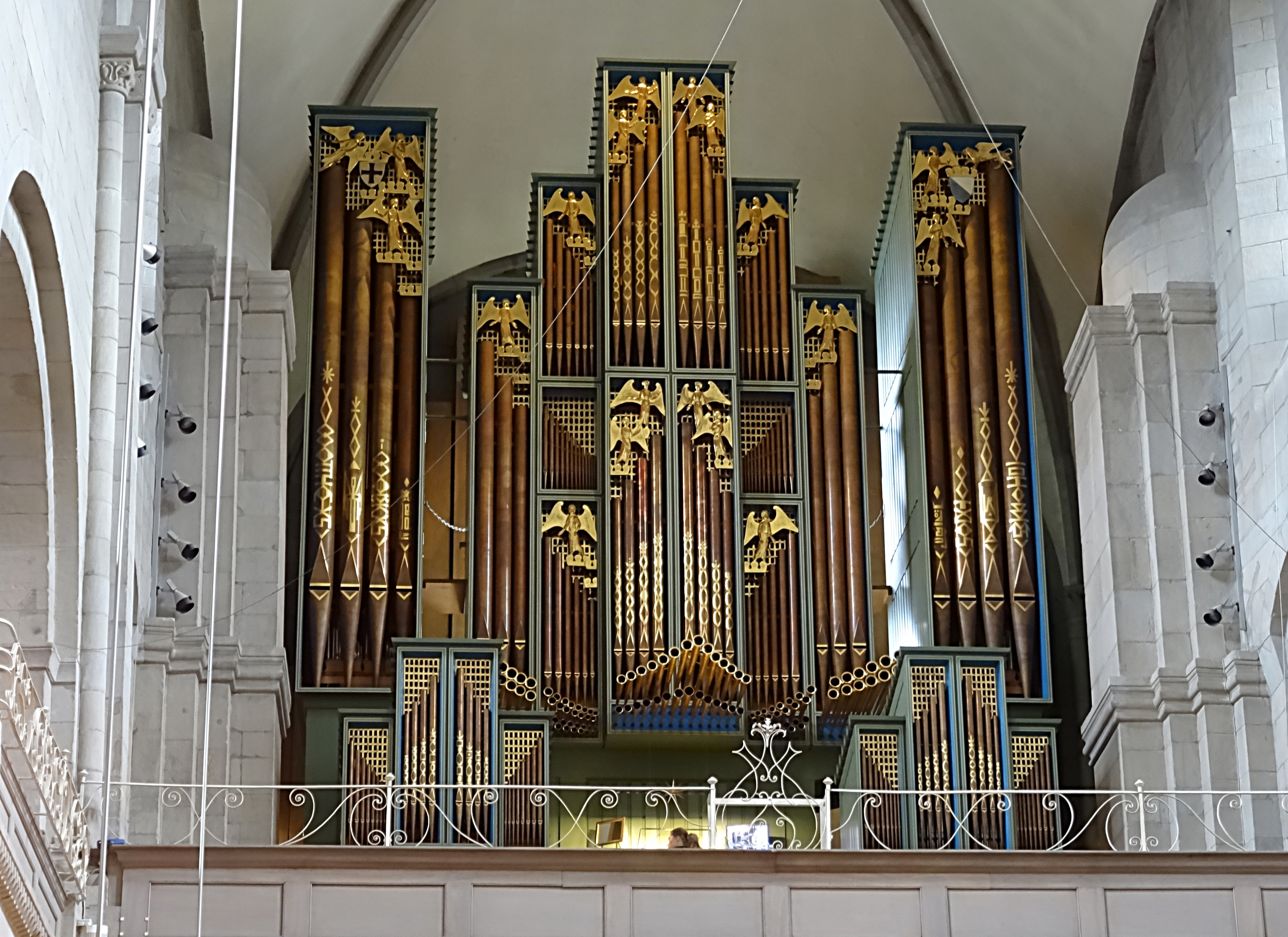
Organ of the Zürich Grossmünster, built in 1960

- Switzerland
  - The organ of the Grossmünster, Zurich
  - The organ of the Jesuit Church in Lucerne
  - The church of St Nikolaus, Bremgarten
  - The organ of St. Peter and St. Paul Church, Villmergen (on which Elena Barshai recorded Bach's Goldberg Variations (audio: ) for Brilliant Classics in autumn 2007).
- United Kingdom
  - The chapel of Trinity College, Cambridge (1975)
  - University Church of St Mary the Virgin, Oxford (1986).
