= Seguer =

Seguer is a surname. Notable people with the surname include:

- Guillem Seguer, 14th-century Catalan sculptor and architect
- Josep Seguer (1923–2014), Spanish footballer and manager
- Mohamed Seguer (born 1985), Algerian footballer

== See also ==
- Seger
