= Matilde de Fassi =

Italian-born Spanish circus performer

Matilde de Fassi (1845–1918), also known as Matilde Price and Matilde Parish, was an Italian-born Spanish circus performer. She was foremost famed as an acrobat equestrian.

She was the adoptive daughter and heir of the circus performer and manager Thomas Price, and married William Parish. She and her spouse founded the Circo Price in 1880, and she served as its director and manager in 1917–18.
