= El ciudadano Simón =

3-act zarzuela by Manuel Manrique de Lara

El ciudadano Simón is a 3-act zarzuela by Spanish composer Manuel Manrique de Lara. Its libretto was reworked from a play by Eduardo Lustonó and Antonio Palomero (1894). The zarzuela was first staged at Circo Price (Madrid) on 6 December 1900. Its story follows that of La tempestad (1882) by Ruperto Chapí, the composer's teacher.

== Roles ==
Role	Voice type	Premiere cast
Magdalena		
Enriqueta	soprano	
Luciano	soprano	
Virginia		
Simón		
Pedro		
The Count		
Lubersac		
Diógenes		
A Sergeant		
Mixed chorus

== Musical Numbers ==
- Prelude
- Act I:
  - No. 1a. Chorus of female villagers (aldeanas). Cuídame el cantarito (female chorus)
  - No. 1b. ¡Yo borrico! (Pedro, female chorus)
  - No. 1c. Vámonos todos a preparar (Pedro, mixed chorus of villagers)
  - No. 2. Duo. Llorad. Sois desgraciada (Magdalena, Lubersac)
  - No. 3. Romanza. ¡Ay de mi! ¿De mi inocencia...? (Simón)
  - No. 4. Finale. ¡Alto! ¡Descansen en su lugar! (Magdalena, Simón, Pedro, the Count, Lubersac, a Sergeant, mixed chorus)
- Act II:
  - No. 5a. Prelude and Chorus of villagers. Terminadas las faenas (mixed chorus)
  - No. 5b. ¡Felices! — ¡Hola Pedro! (Pedro, mixed chorus)
  - No. 6. Quartet. Ciudadanos. — Ciudadanos. — Ellos son aquí estan (Enriqueta, Virginia, the Count, Diógenes)
  - No. 7. Duo. ¡Mi Enriqueta! — ¡Mi Luciano! (Enriqueta, Luciano)
  - No. 8. La cosa me disgusta y estoy por escapar (Luciano, Pedro)
  - No. 8bis. (instrumental)
  - No. 9. Finale. ¡Ciudadano Simón, te buscaba! (Magdalena, Virginia, Simón, Pedro, Lubersac, Diógenes, mixed chorus)
- Act III:
  - Preludio (instrumental)
  - No. 10. ¡No me han visto! ¡Se alejan! (Magdalena, Luciano, Simón)
  - No. 11a. ¡Ya se fuerme! ¡Si me encuentran...! (Lubersac, later Magdalena, Luciano)
  - No. 11b. Señor, señor, mi súplica escuchad (Magdalena)
  - No. 11c. Esplendidos lucen los rayos del sol (mixed chorus of fishermen, behind the scenes) — Dios de las alturas (Enriqueta, mixed chorus)
  - Finale (instrumental)
