= Ramon Martí (disambiguation) =

Raymond Martini (fl. 1250–1284) was a Dominican theologian.

Ramon Martí may also refer to:

- Ramon Martí Alsina (1826–1894), Catalan painter
- Ramon Martí i Martí (1917–2011), Catalan metalsmith
