= Vallbona Abbey =

Cistercian abbey in Catalonia

Coordinates: 41°31′28.58″N 1°5′17.84″E

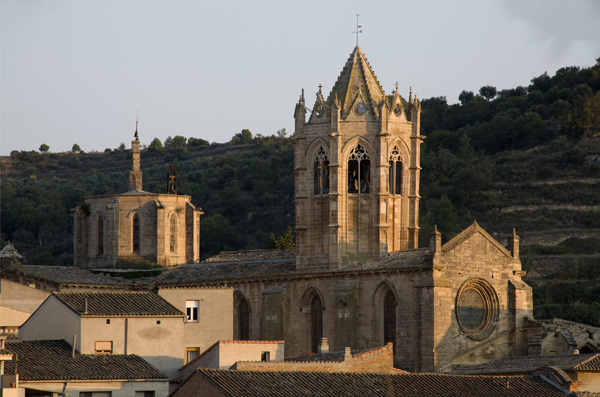
View of the abbey

Vallbona Abbey, otherwise the Monastery of Santa Maria de Vallbona (Catalan: Santa Maria de Vallbona de les Monges; Spanish: El Real Monasterio de Santa María de Vallbona), is a Cistercian nunnery in Vallbona de les Monges, in the comarca of Urgell, Catalonia, Spain. Founded in the early 12th century, and built between then and the 14th century, it is one of the most important monastic sites in Catalonia. Its church represents an example of transition between Romanesque and Gothic architecture. The abbey was declared a national monument on 3 June 1931.

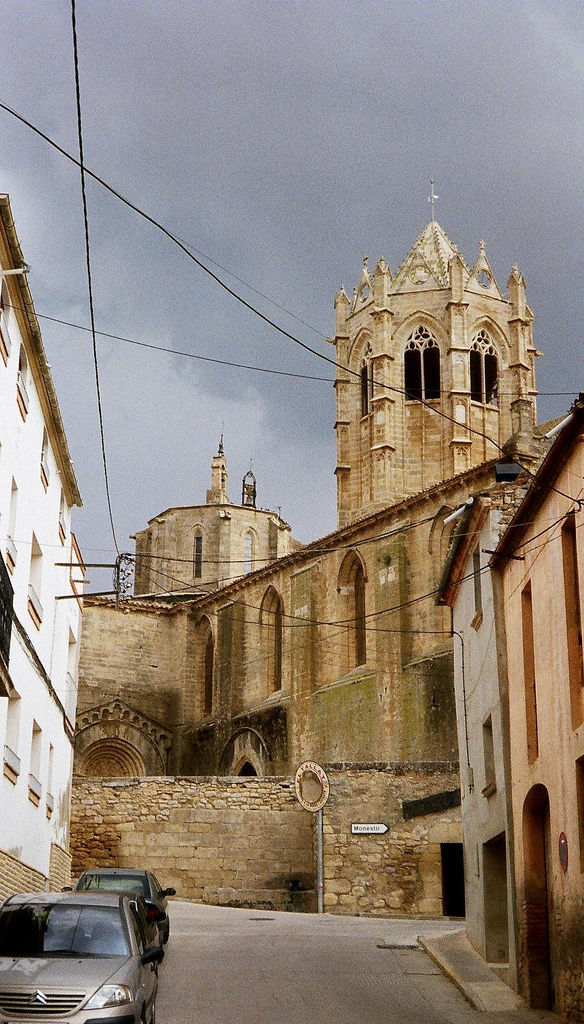
Vallbona de les Monges

Together with the monasteries of Poblet and of Santes Creus it forms part of the Cistercian Route.

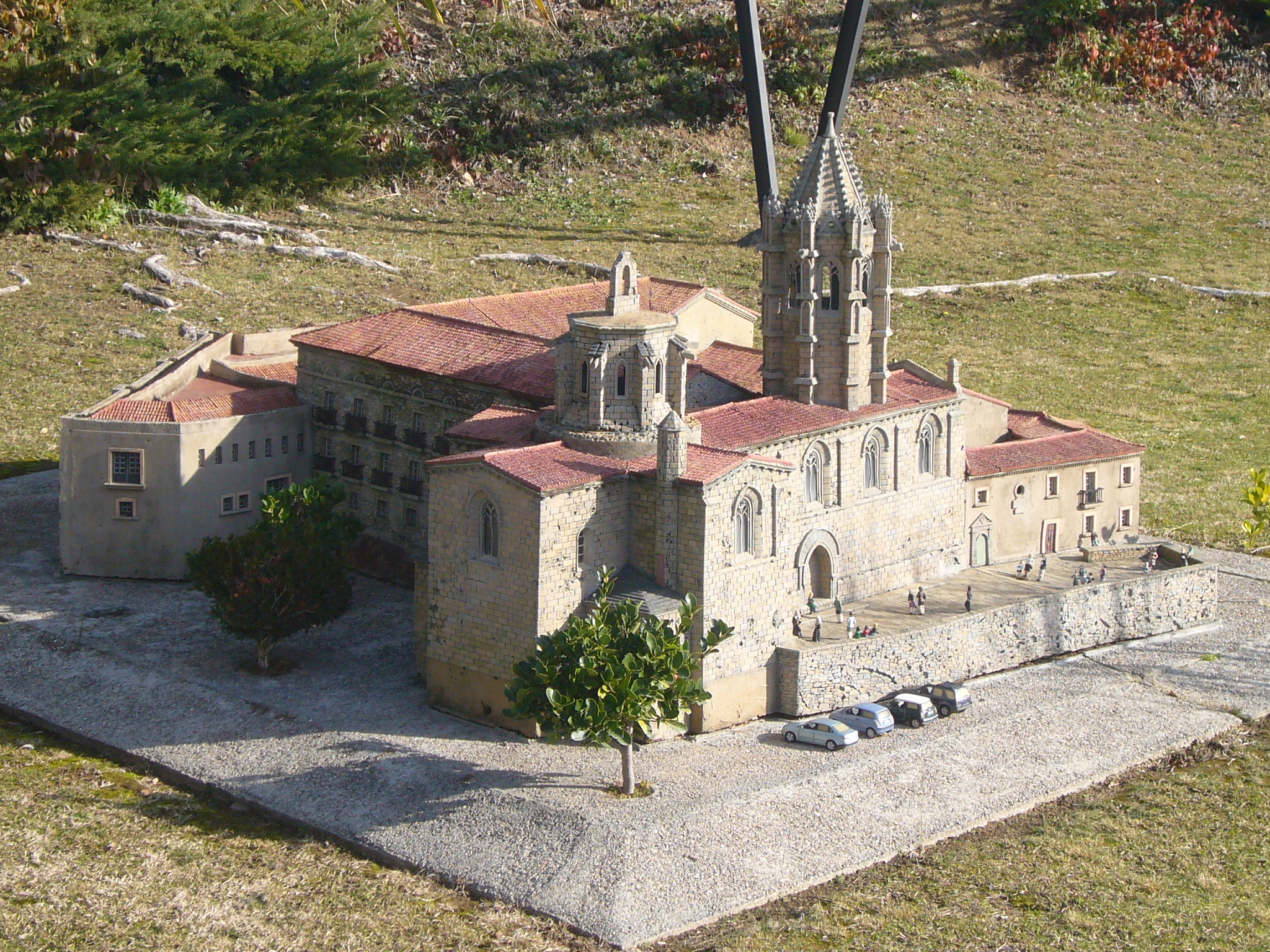
Model of Vallbona Abbey, at Catalunya en Miniatura

== History ==
=== Foundation and origins ===
Initially the monastery consisted of a community of hermits or anchorites of both sexes, founded by Ramon de Vallbona and documented from 1157, which followed the Rule of St. Benedict. In 1163 the community received a gift of land from Ramon Berenguer IV, count of Barcelona. By 1175 only a small group of nuns remained, who decided to affiliate themselves to the Cistercian Order. The first abbess, Oria Ramirez, was appointed in the following year from Tulebras Abbey (Monastery of Santa Maria de la Caridad) in Tulebras, Navarre.

The abbey received several privileges from King Alfonso II of Aragon and his wife Sancha of Castile, and was subsequently able to expand thanks to the numerous gifts from noble families. From Pope Innocent III the abbey received in 1198 and 1200 the grant of Papal immunity and protection of goods, and a bull in 1201 regulated the enclosure and ensured its independence from the episcopate. King James I of Aragon not only stayed in the abbey on repeated occasions but also sponsored its construction.

Thanks to the numerous properties received through donations and wills, among them that of Count Ermengol VII himself, the sizeable lordship of the abbey was formed between the 12th and 14th centuries, especially in the County of Urgel. Legal confirmation was achieved under the mandate of Abbess Saurena de Anglesola (1379-1392), who bought from King Peter III of Aragon the civil and criminal jurisdiction of all the monastery's possessions for 22,000 Barcelona salaries. These acquisitions allowed the establishment of the barony of Vallbona and made the monastery the centre of political and legal life for all the towns and districts that made it up. At this time, the community was made up of about 150 nuns, most of whom belonged to the Catalan nobility, from families such as the Cardonas, Cerveras, Queralts, Boixadors and Anglesolas.

The abbey's library together with the scriptorium achieved great fame. Fourteen codices from the 13th century were copied and illustrated by the old nuns and are kept in the archive with numerous old documents of great interest for regional and national historiography. The pharmacy, which supplied all the villages of the barony, has surviving documentation from the 15th century.

=== Decline and resurgence ===
The abbey was deeply impacted by the Catalan civil war of 1462-1472 and later the Council of Trent (1545-1563), which had a notable repercussion on the abbey: one of its agreements prohibited the existence of female religious communities in unpopulated places, which forced the nuns in 1573 to cede part of their lands to people from other places, mainly Montesquieu, in order to create a centre of population around the abbey so that it could stay where it was. This was the origin of the present town of Vallbona de las Monjas.

For this purpose, all the monastery's external buildings were converted (similar to those that still remain in Poblet Abbey and Santes Creus), and only the strictly conventual premises were retained, apart from the church and the cloister. The following times were difficult. In the 17th century there were disputes with the Cistercian order, mainly with Poblet Abbey over the dues Vallbona had to pay them. These weakened the abbey's economy, and the financial situation was made still worse by the ravages caused by the Reapers' War (1640-1652), followed by the War of the Spanish Succession (1705-1717) and the Roussillon War (1788-1795). The nuns also had numerous disputes with the towns belonging to their barony. The Ecclesiastical confiscations of Mendizábal in the 1830s caused them to be exclaustrated for six months, but they were able to continue monastic life and did not suffer as much damage as the monasteries of Poblet or Santes Creus.

=== Present day ===
Since then the abbey has housed a community of Cistercian nuns uninterruptedly, with the sole exception of the period of the Spanish Civil War, and remains a functioning monastery, although it is open to visitors daily.

In 1986, the Department of Culture of the Generalitat de Catalunya commissioned the architect Llorens i Perelló to restore the buildings and to construct a new building for the nuns' cells and work rooms. These works were resumed in 1997. Some rooms have been fitted out for accommodation which, together with ceramic works, word processing and computer music scores, and tourist visits to the monastery, represent a good source of income for the community.

== Buildings ==
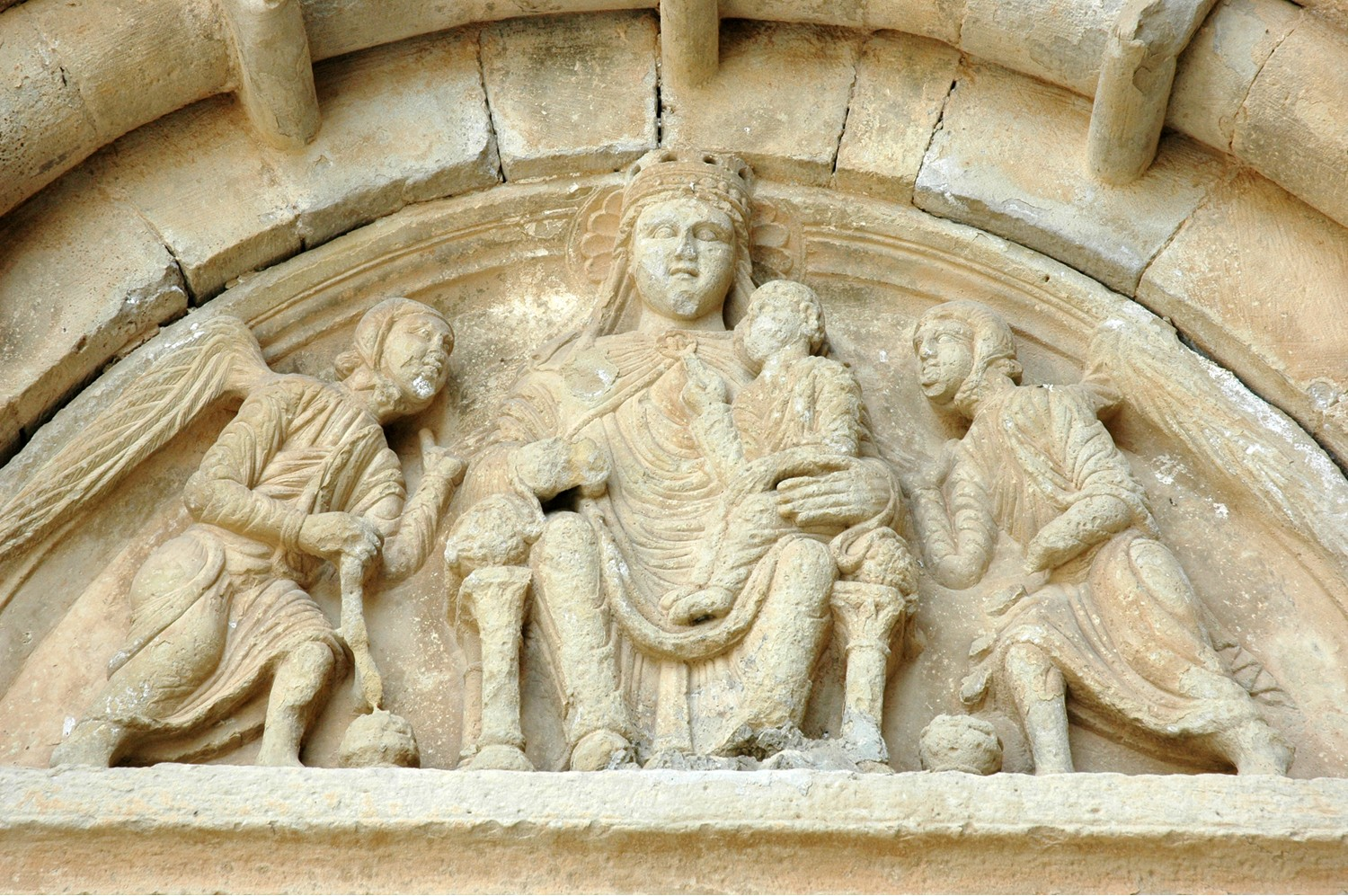
Tympanum with Virgin and Child

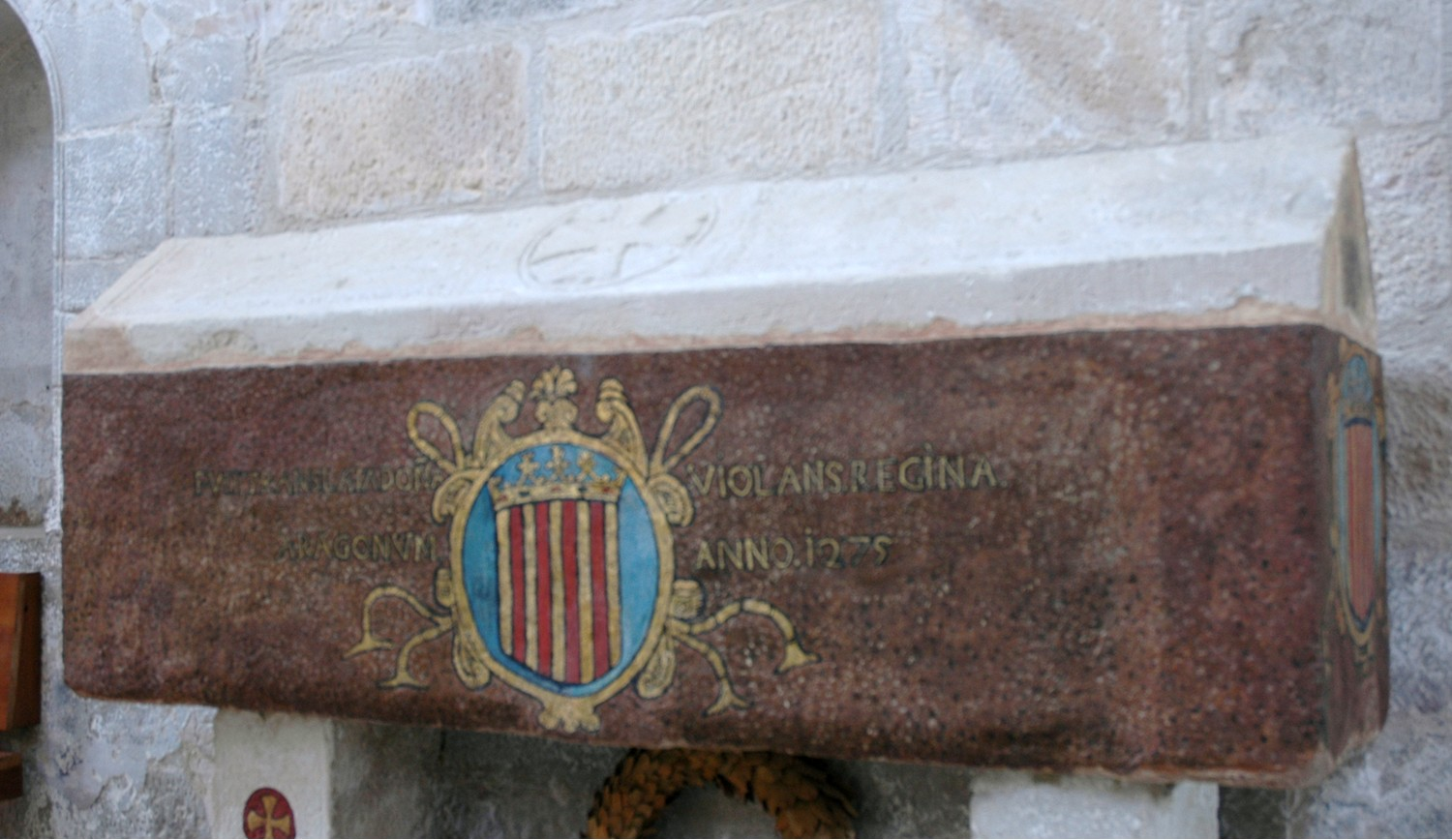
Tomb of Violant of Hungary

=== Church ===
The church, built in the 12th-14th centuries in a transitional style between the Romanesque and the Gothic, has a Latin cross plan with a single nave including four aisles, and a transept. The latter is longer but narrower than the nave, to which it is connected by a rectangular crossing surmounted by an octagonal dome, supported by 13th century squinches. The transept's arms end with square apse chapels. The nave is covered by cross vaults, while the transept has barrel vaults.

The bell tower, built over the second section of the nave between 1340 and 1348 under the Abbess Elisenda de Copons, has an octagonal plan. It is in Gothic style. The presbytery houses the tomb of Violant of Hungary, wife of King James I of Aragon, who died in 1251 and whose remains were brought here in 1275. To the right of the choir is the Corpus Christi Chapel, which has a polychrome stone image of the Virgin Mary, work of Guillem Seguer.

In the presbytery, on the right side of the altar, there is the tomb of Violant of Hungary, wife of King James I of Aragon. She died in 1251 in the monastery of Salas de Huesca, but her body was moved to the abbey in 1275, which is the date of the inscription of her sarcophagus. Her daughter, Sancha of Aragon, a nun who died in the Holy Land, was also buried here after her body was transferred to the monastery; her sarcophagus is on three inverted columns "to the funeral" as a sign of mourning.

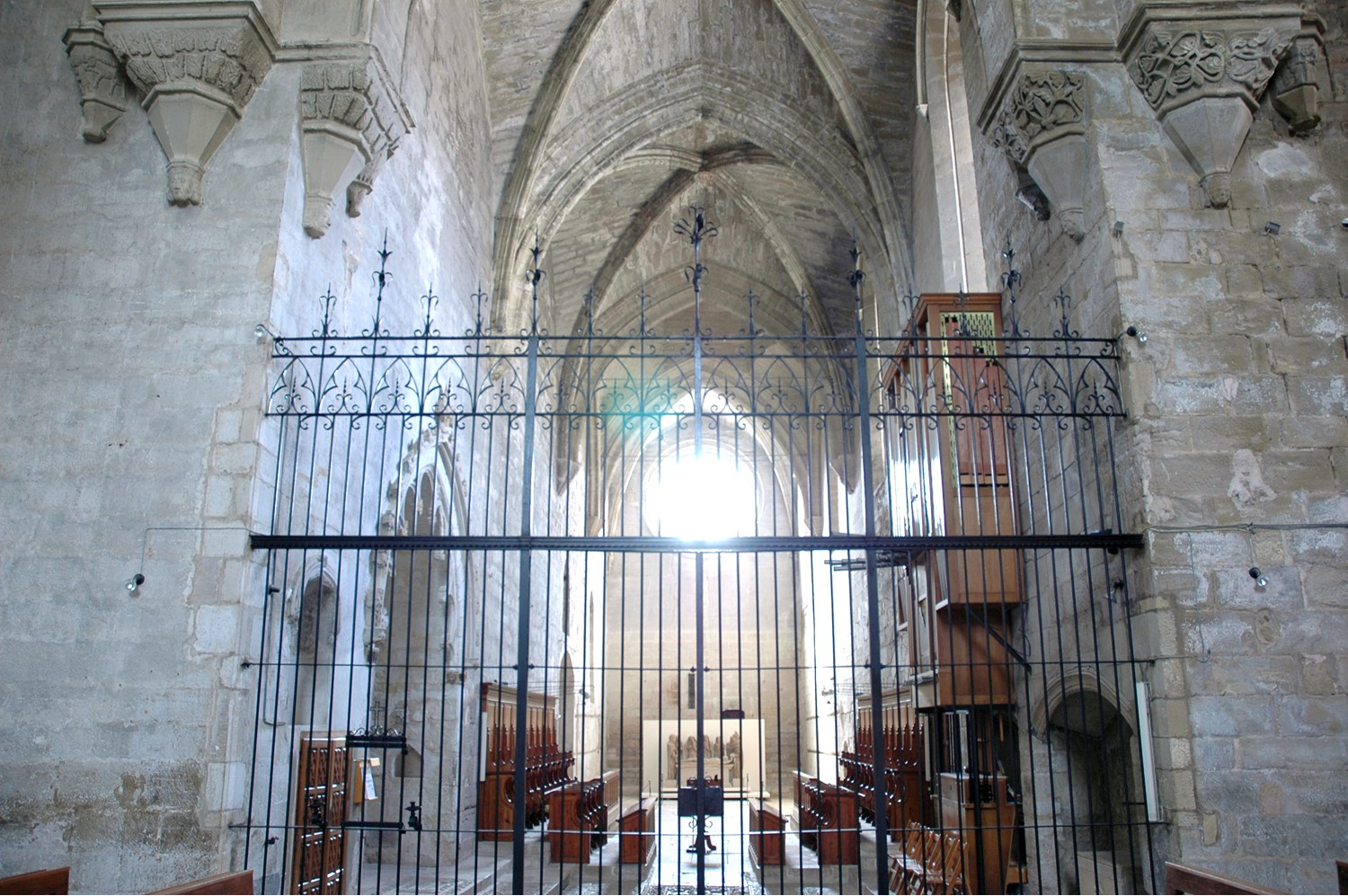
Nave and choir

In the southern aisle is the tomb of Ferrer Alamany de Toralla, who died in 1360, and his wife Beatriz de Guimerà, featuring the figures of the husband on the lid dressed as a gentleman with heraldry and of the wife on one side dressed in the Cistercian habit. At the bottom of the wall there is a representation of two angels carrying the souls of the dead to heaven.

To the right of the choir is the chapel of Corpus Christi, where there is an image of the Virgin Mary in polychrome stone, the work of Guillem Seguer. From the altar of this chapel, two antependia from the 14th century are preserved in the National Art Museum of Catalonia. A gate separates the nave from the transept.

=== Portals ===
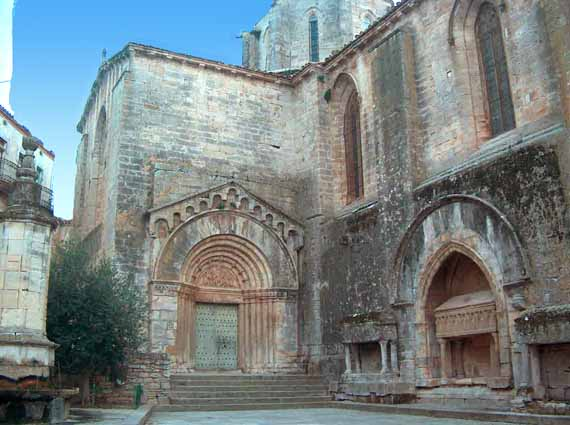
Church portals

The main portal is located in the northern transept arm and faces the abbey square or Plaza Mayor. It features a semicircular arch and five archivolts supported by columns and capitals with foliate reliefs similar to the east gallery of the cloister and a tympanum sculpted with the Virgin and Child, surrounded by angels. Above it there is a cornice with a frieze of blind arcades with corbels sculpted with various motifs.

Another doorway is located on the church's northern wall, but is now obstructed by a sarcophagus enclosed in an ogival arch as an arcosolium, on which there is a Trinitarian chrismon from the end of the 12th century. This wall has a total of five sarcophagi, four in Romanesque style (13th century) and one in Gothic style. All of them bear heraldic symbols and in two of them the names can be read: Sibil-la de Guimerà, wife of Guerau Alamany, and Miquela Sasala, from 1244.

=== Cloister ===
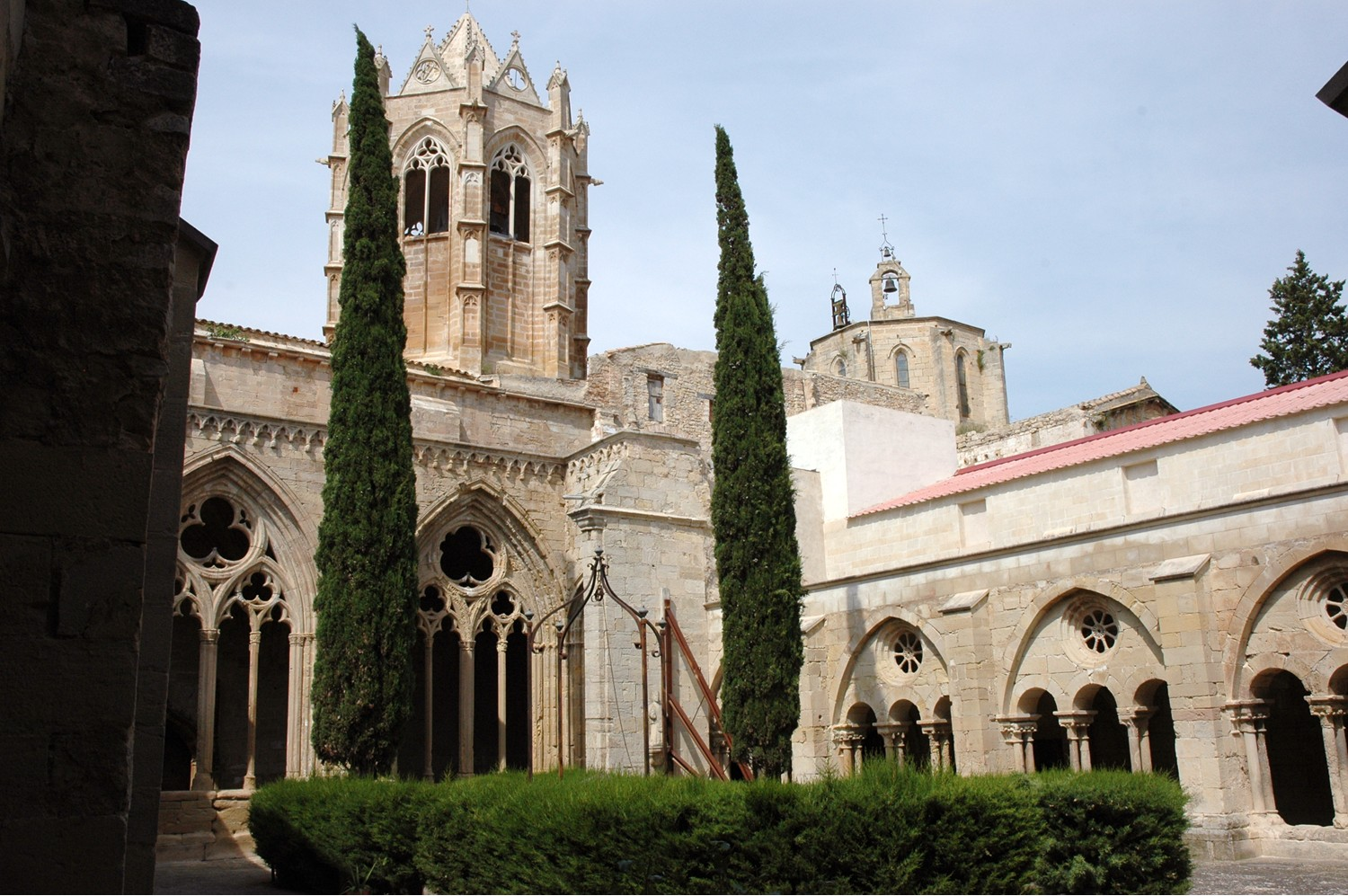
Cloister, with the northern Gothic wing (left) and eastern Romanesque (right) wing.

The cloister is on a quadrangular plan, whose sides, of different lengths, correspond to different successive ages and construction styles (12th-15th centuries). The oldest section, on the south, shows the original sober Romanesque-Cistercian canons: it has three spans formed by three piers, with three rounded arcades supported by columns with undecorated capitals.

The eastern wing is also in Romanesque style (early 13th century), and has five spans divided by four pilasters, The arcades form triple mullioned windows with, in the mullions, small rose windows with decoration in Arabic style. The capitals of the columns have vegetable motifs.

The northern wing is the shortest one; it has wide hollows with ogival traceries in Gothic style, dating to the 14th century. The western side, the most recent one, was built in the 15th century in proto-Renaissance style. The capitals of the columns show the heraldic symbols of the Caldés family, who produced the monastery's abbesses during that period.

The chapter hall is accessed from the cloister through a Gothic gate built under abbess Anglesola in the 14th century, and has a cross-vault cover. The pavement features several tomb slabs of abbesses, and there is an alabaster image of the Virgin of Mercy, attributed to the sculptor Pere Johan.
