= Poblet Abbey =

Monastery in Catalonia, Spain

Royal Abbey of Santa Maria de Poblet
- Reial Monestir de Santa Maria de Poblet
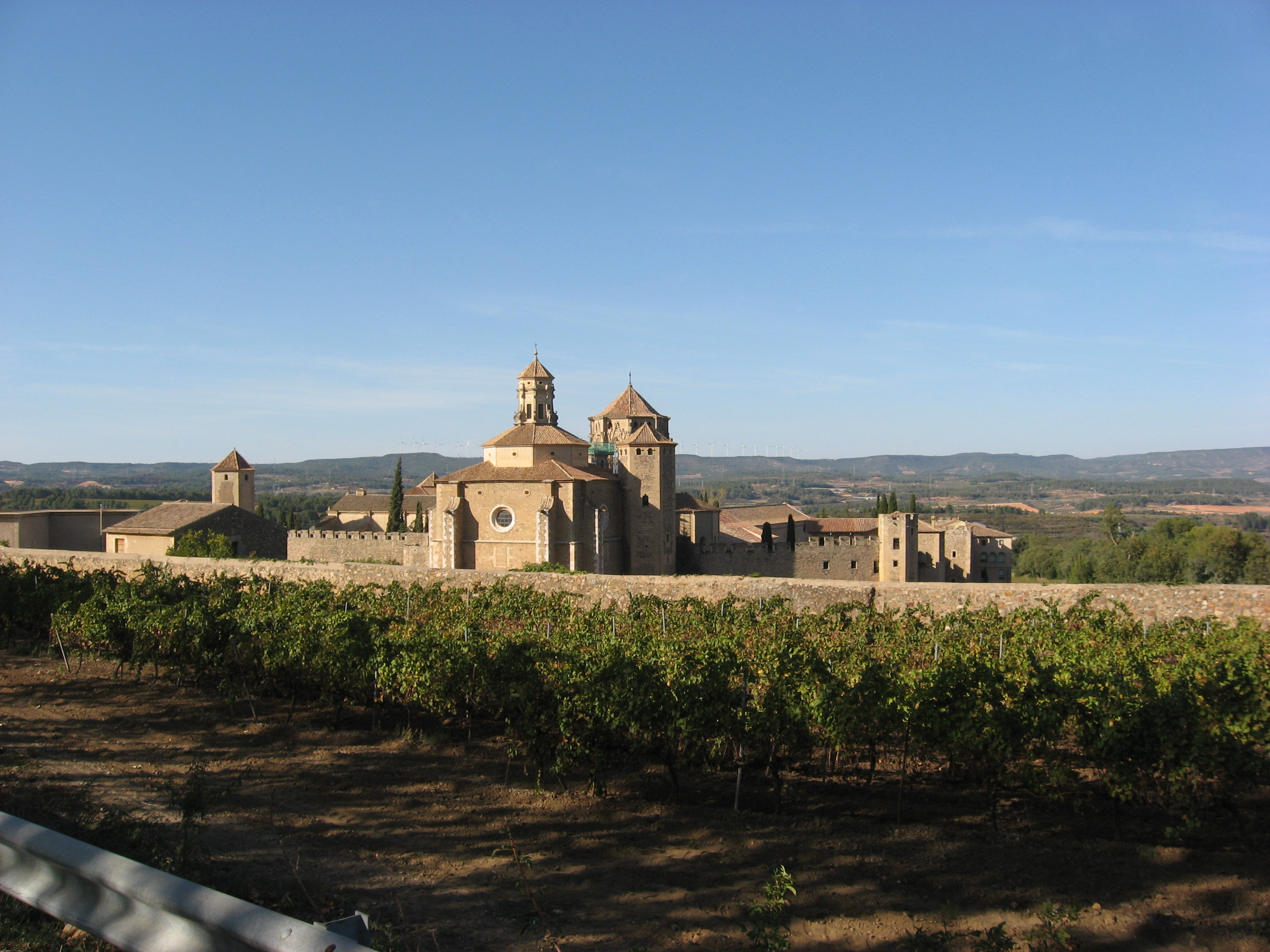

- Location within Catalonia

Religion
- Affiliation: Catholic Church
- Leadership: Abott Octavi Vilà i Mayo

Location
- Location: Vimbodí i Poblet (Tarragona), Catalonia, Spain
- Coordinates: 41°22′51″N 1°04′57″E

Architecture
- Architect: Arnau Bargués
- Type: Monastery
- Style: Catalan Gothic

Website
- www.poblet.cat

UNESCO World Heritage Site
- Criteria: Cultural: (i), (iv)
- Reference: 518
- Inscription: 1991 (15th Session)

Spanish Cultural Heritage
- Type: Non-movable
- Criteria: Monument
- Designated: 13 July 1921
- Reference no.: RI-51-0000197

Poblet Abbey, otherwise the Royal Abbey of Santa Maria de Poblet (Catalan: Reial Monestir de Santa Maria de Poblet), is a Cistercian monastery, founded in 1151 by Cistercian monks from France, located at the foot of the Prades Mountains, in the comarca of Conca de Barberà, in Catalonia (Spain). The main architect was Arnau Bargués.

This monastery was the first of three sister monasteries, known as the Cistercian triangle, that helped consolidate power in Catalonia in the 12th century. (The other two are Vallbona de les Monges and Santes Creus.)

== Significance ==
Poblet was one of the two royal pantheons of the kings of the Crown of Aragon since James I of Aragon (along with Monastery of San Juan de la Peña). Some of the most important royal sepulchres have alabaster statues that lie over the tomb. The kings have lion sculptures at their feet, while the queens have dogs.

Peter IV of Aragon (1319 – 1387) made it a condition, under solemn oath at the moment of crowning, that all the Aragonese kings be buried there. Only Ferdinand II of Aragon broke the oath, after his kingdoms had been merged with the Crown of Castile, and was buried in Granada.

At the height of its splendor, the monastery was home to more than 300 monks and had numerous "Cistercian farms" run by lay brothers who exploited its agricultural land and forests. The monastery buildings occupy about 12,000 square metres (129,000 sq ft).

== Burials ==
The following kings and queens of Aragon are buried at Poblet Monastery:

- Alfonso II (1196)
- James I (1276)
- Peter IV (1387), and his first three wives Maria of Navarre, Eleanor of Portugal, and Eleanor of Sicily
- John I (1396), and his wives, Martha of Armagnac and Violant of Bar
- Martin (1410), and his first wife, Maria de Luna
- Ferdinand I (1416), and his wife, Eleanor of Alburquerque
- Alfonso V (1458)
- John II (1479), and his second wife, Joana Enríquez

Additional notable figures interred here include the Hungarian queen Beatrice of Naples (1508), Philip Wharton, 1st Duke of Wharton (1731) and Archduke Karl Pius of Austria, Prince of Tuscany, Carlist-Carloctavismo pretender as "Carlos VIII" (1953).

The tombs of the royals were restored by the Catalan sculptor Frederic Marés in 1948.

== Ruin and rebuilding ==
The monastery, which had already suffered damage during the First Carlist War, was closed down due to the Ecclesiastical Confiscations of Mendizábal in 1835 during Isabella II of Spain's rule. The Desamortización or secularization of the place brought monastic life to an end. On 24 July of the same year the monastery was plundered by representatives of the Mendizábal's government and unruly mobs. During the events all valuable paintings and furniture were removed and dispersed. Also parts of the monastery were destroyed by fire.

Monestir de Poblet a vista de drone 2.7K 50fps

In the years that followed, the Monastery fell into disrepair and ruin; some of the main roofs caved in. The tombs of the rulers of the Crown of Aragon were desecrated and the remains were transferred and kept for a while in the Cathedral of Tarragona, thanks to the intervention of Rev. Antoni Serret from the neighboring town of L'Espluga.

Finally the monastery was refounded in 1940 by Italian monks of the same order and repair and reconstruction began. Close to the entrance of the church one building has been kept in a ruined state as a reminder. Remains of the deceased of the ancient Royal House of Aragon were put back in sepulchres, but are now co-mingled.

Poblet belongs to the Cistercian Congregation of the Crown of Aragon, along with Santa Maria de Solius and convents such as Santa Maria de Vallbona and Santa Maria de Valldonzella. The Abbot of Poblet is the ex officio chairman of the Congregation. Today the monastic community of Poblet is composed of 29 professed monks, 1 regular oblate, 1 novice and 2 familiars.

Poblet Monastery has been a UNESCO World Heritage Site since 1991. The altar (1527) was sculpted by Damián Forment.

In 2010, Spanish architect Mariano Bayón designed the Poblet Monastery Guesthouse.

== Abbots ==
The following abbots have led the Abbey since the return of the monks in 1940 (between 1940 and 1953, this place was a priory rather than an abbey):

- 1954–1966: Edmon Maria Garreta i Olivella
- 1966–1970: Robert Saladrigues
- 1970–1998: Maurus Esteva Alsina
- 1998–2015: Josep Alegre i Vilas
- 2015–2024: Octavi Vilà Mayo, Appointed Bishop of Girona
- 2024–present: Rafel Barruè i Broch

== Gallery ==
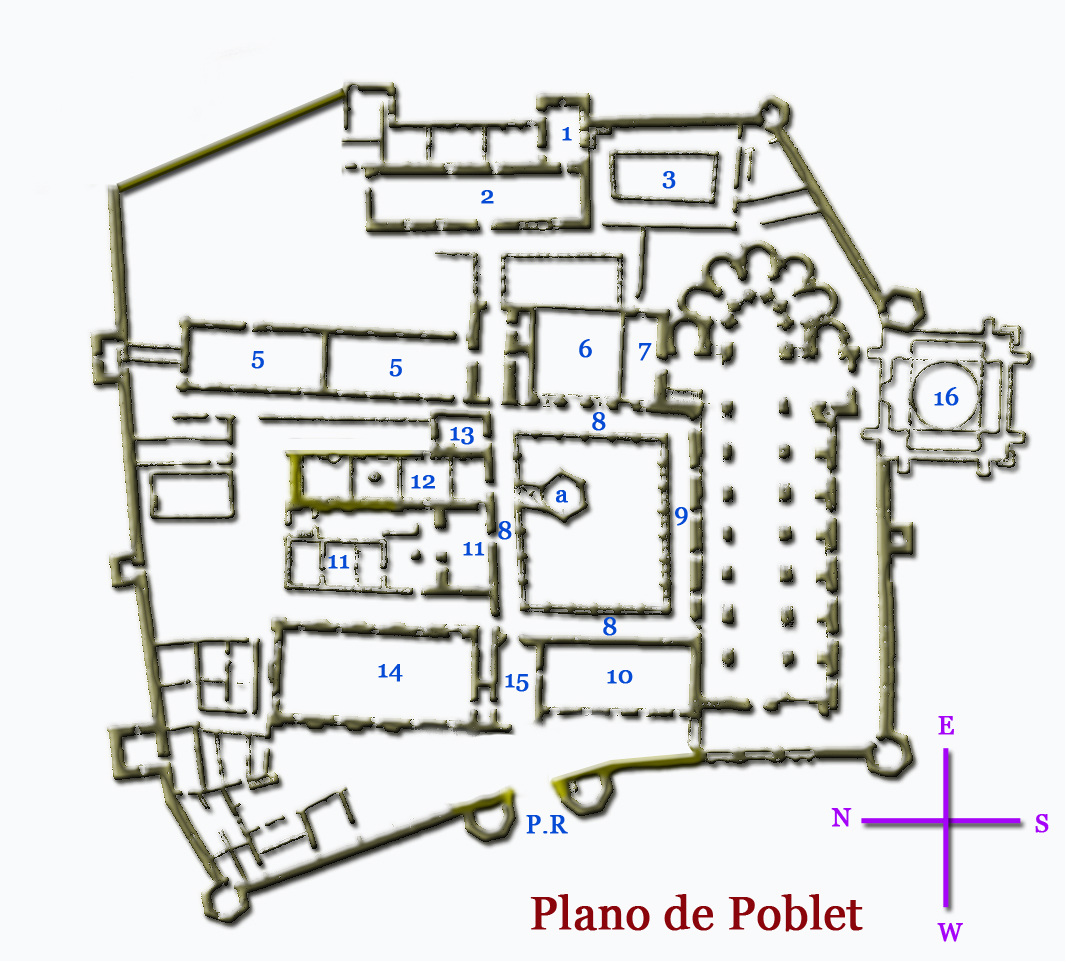
Poblet ground plan

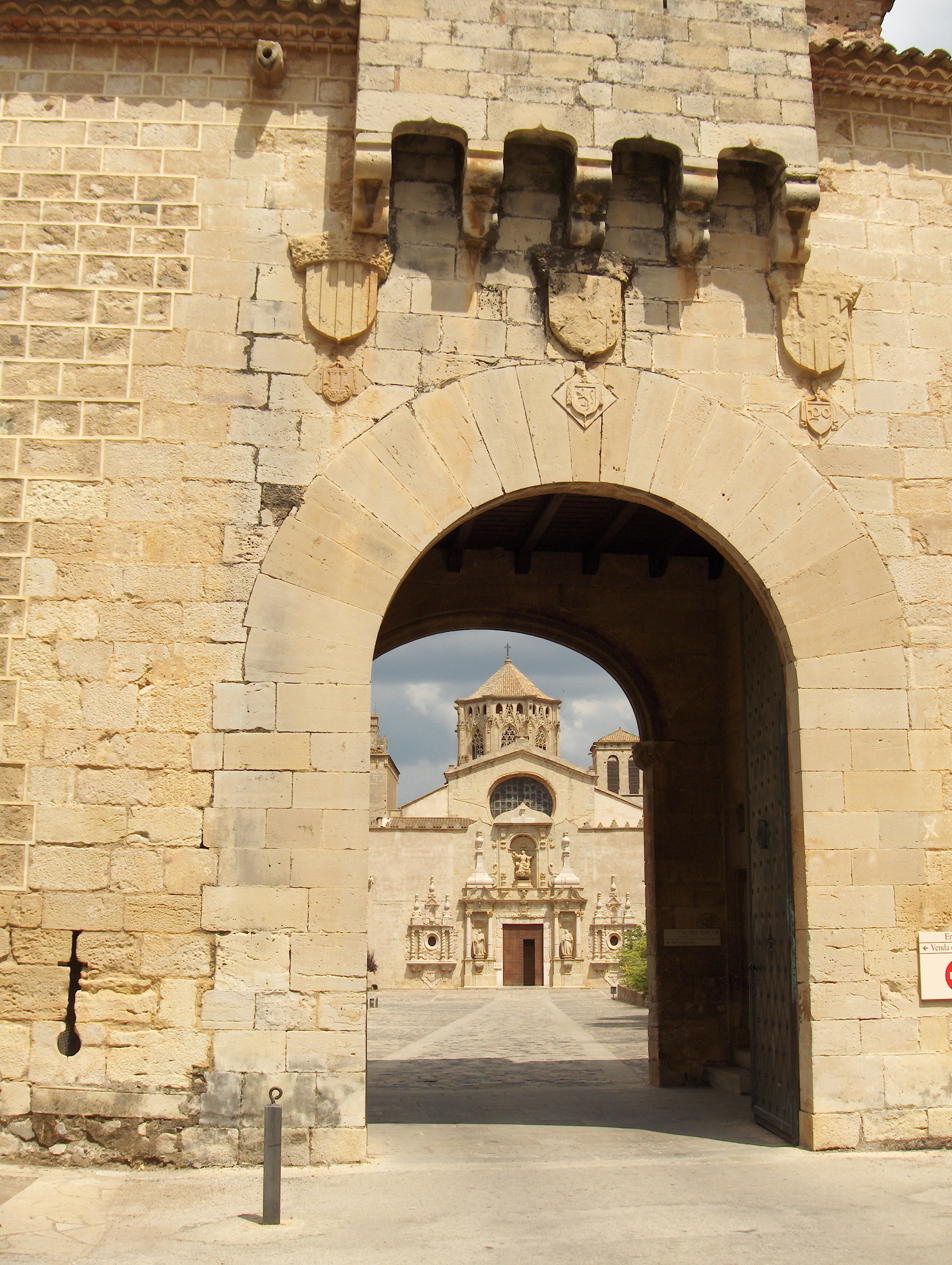
Gate

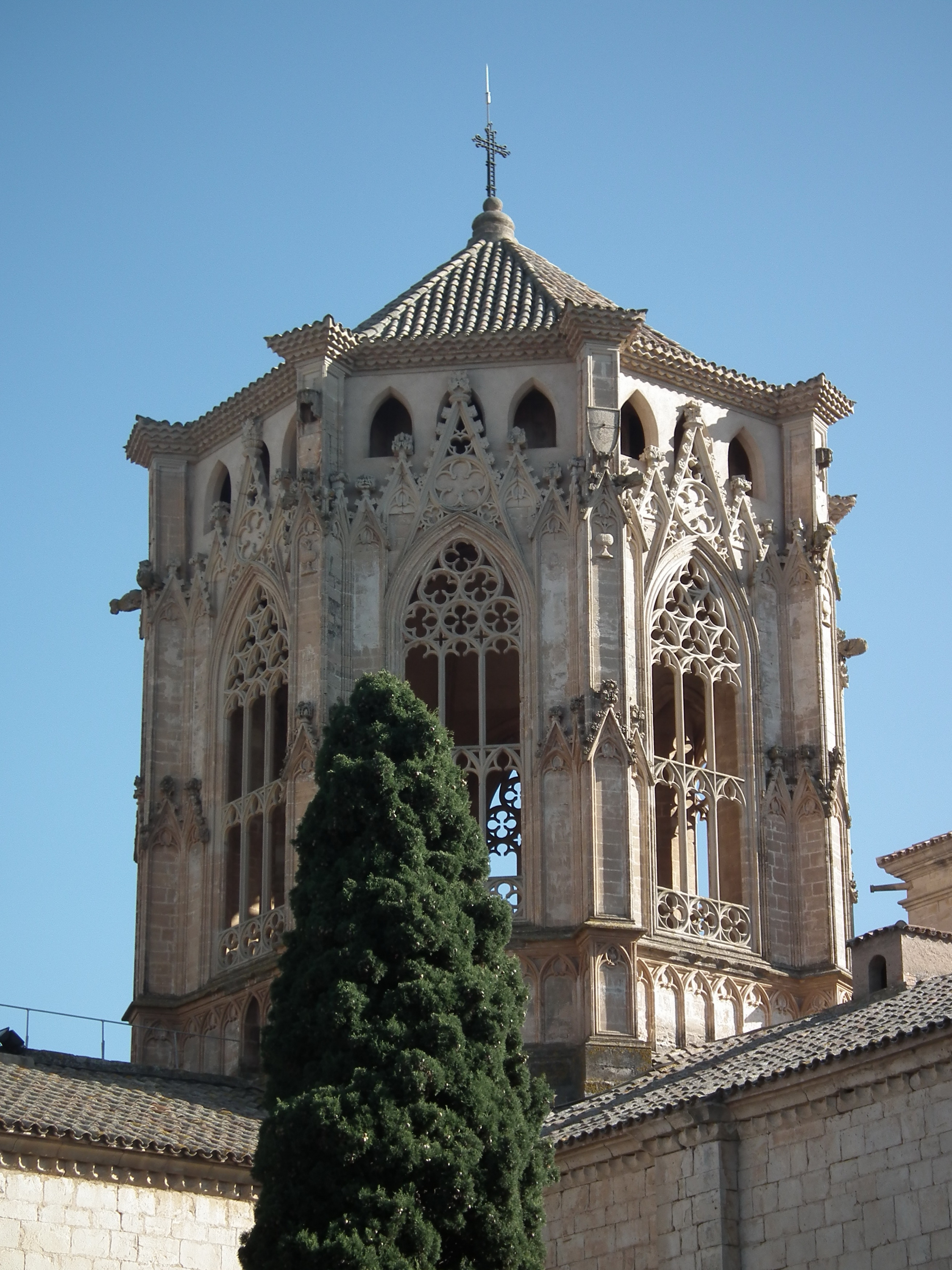
Main belltower

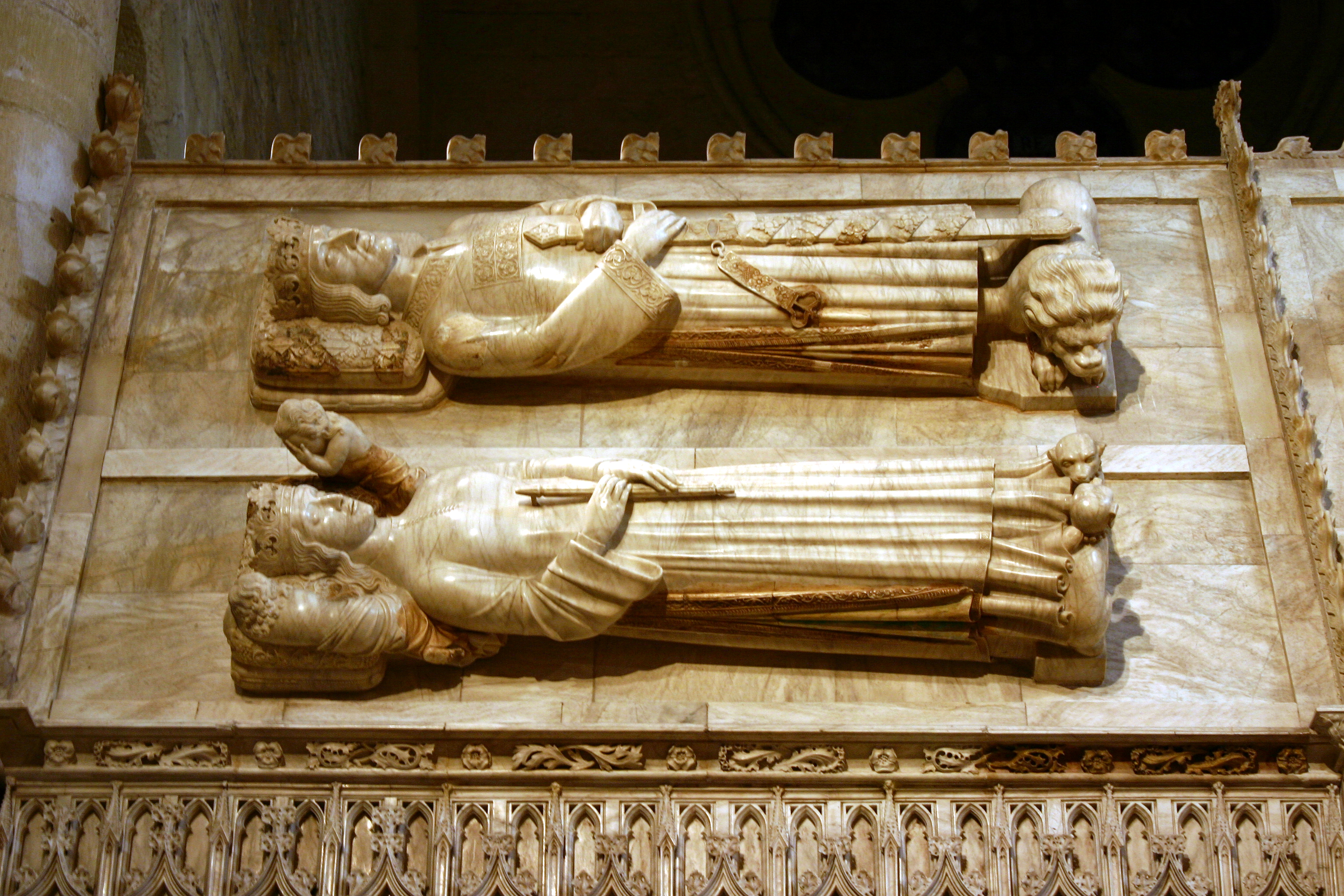
Tomb of Ferdinand I of Aragon and Eleanor of Albuquerque of Aragon within the Reial Monestir de Poblet

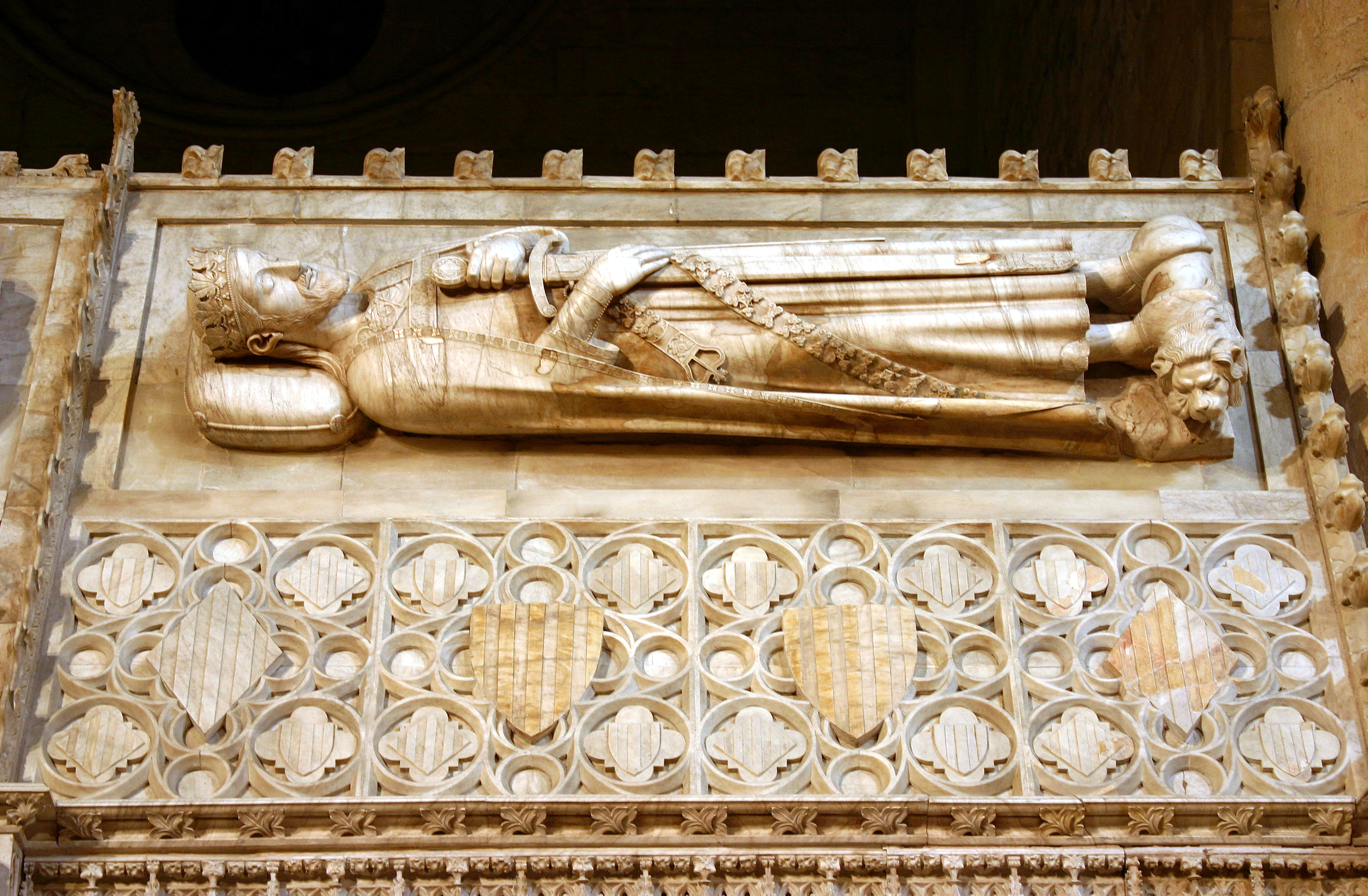
Tomb of James I of Aragon

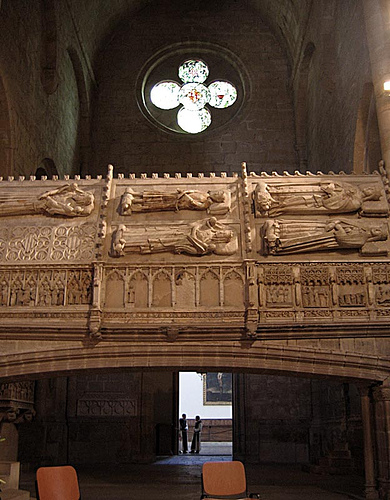
Part of the Royal Pantheon after restoration

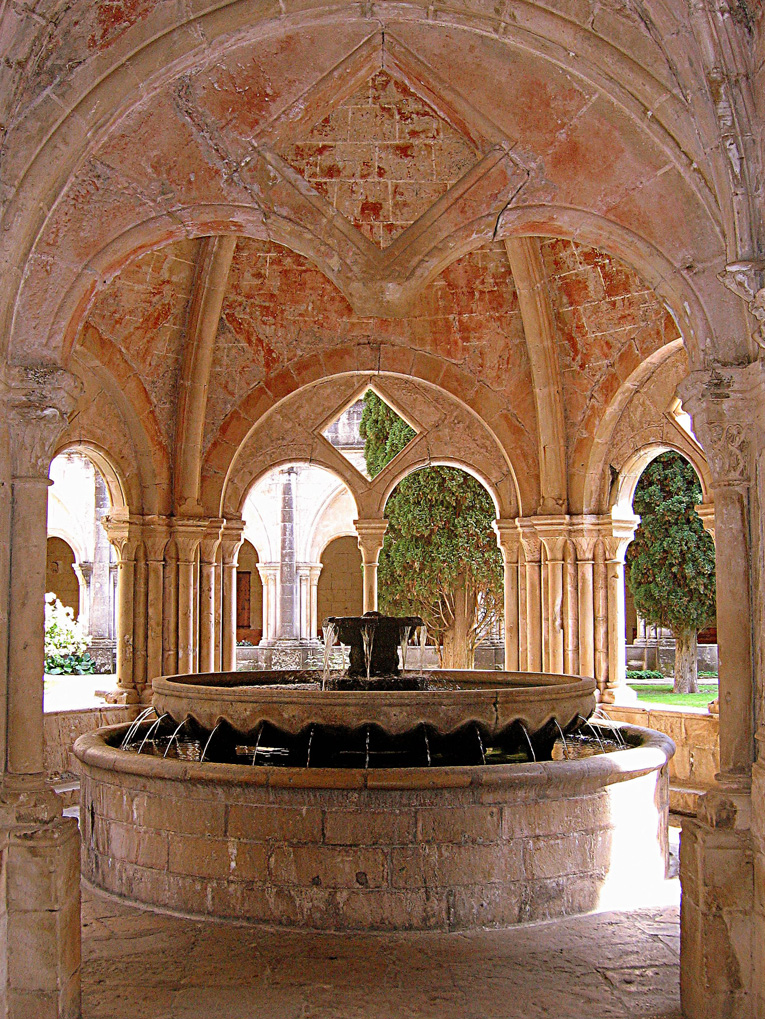
Fountain for ablutions in one of the cloisters

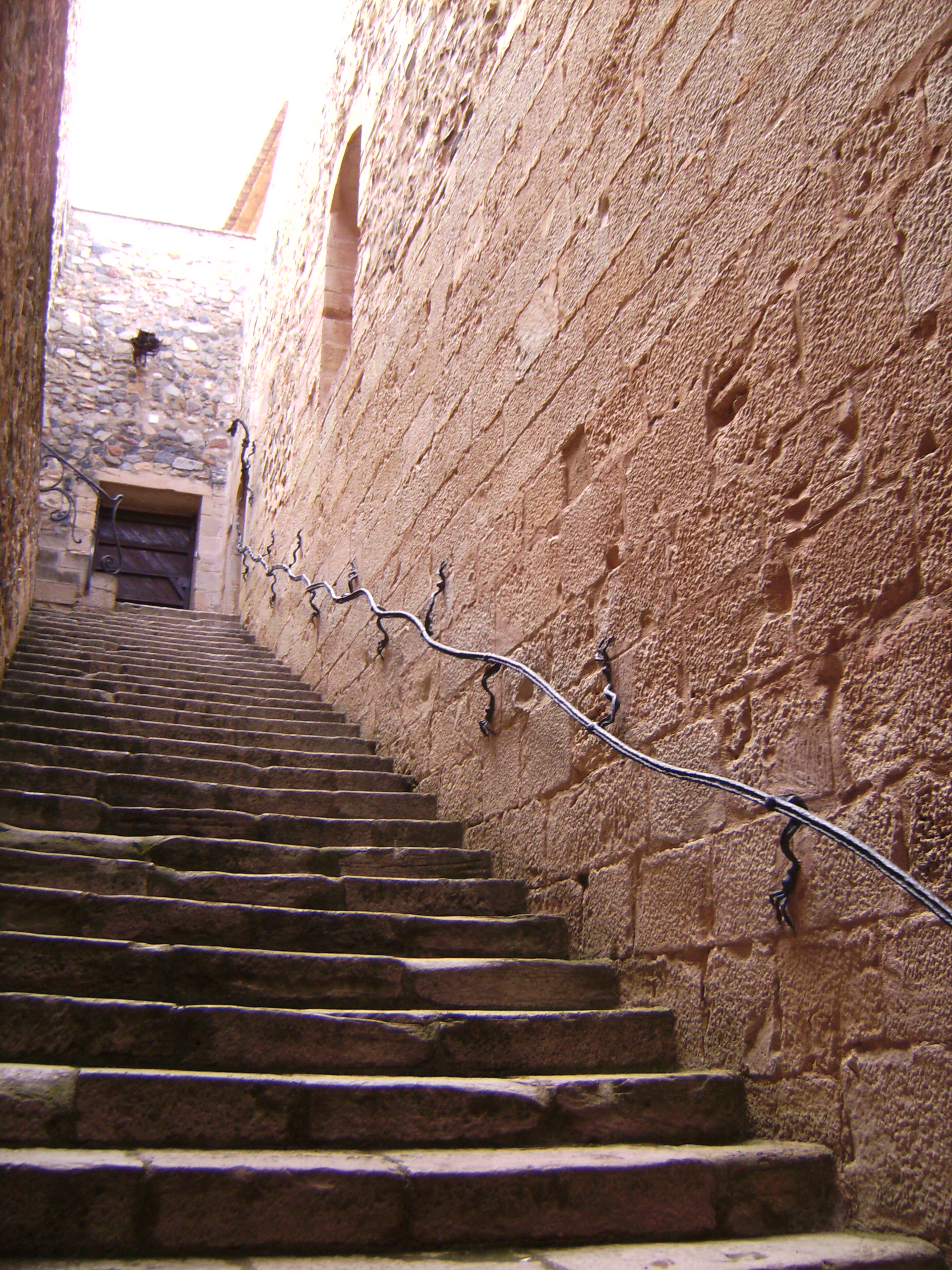
Dragon handrail by Ramon Martí i Martí

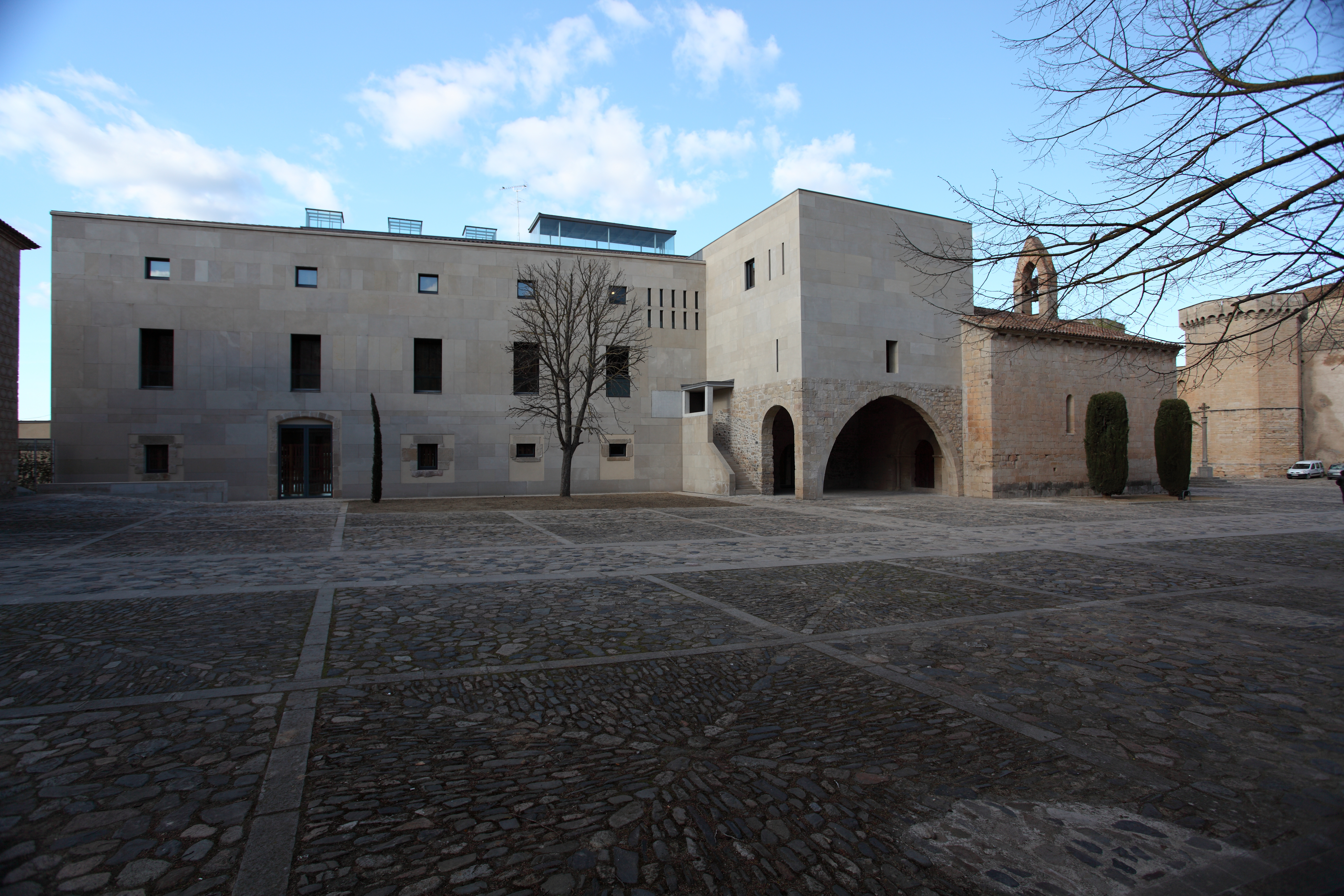
Poblet Monastery Guesthouse in Tarragona. Architect Mariano Bayón. 2010

== See also ==
- Crown of Aragon
- Organ of Poblet
- Pedro Antonio de Aragón, patron
