= Josep Alegre i Vilas =

Spanish Roman Catholic monk (1940–2024)

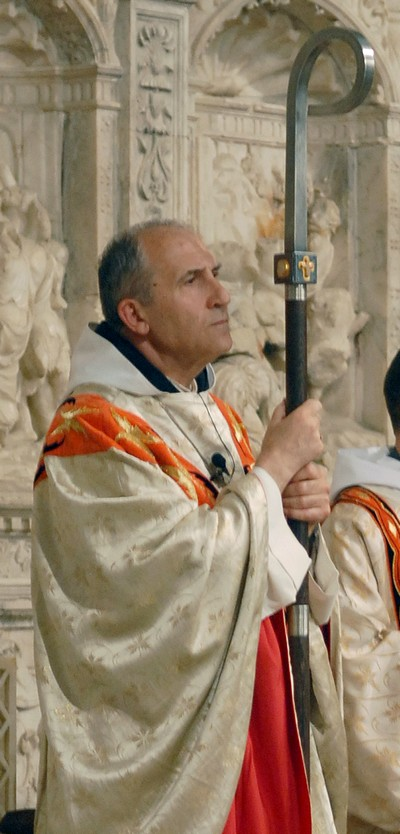
Alegre i Vilas in 2008

Josep Alegre i Vilas (8 November 1940 – 26 January 2024) was a Spanish Roman Catholic monk.

Born on 8 November 1940, he was the abbot of the Royal Abbey of Santa Maria de Poblet from 1998 to 2015. Alegre i Vilas died on 26 January 2024, at the age of 83.
