= Mariano Bayón =

Spanish architect (born 1942)

- Born: Mariano Bayón Álvarez; 25 September 1942 (age 83); Madrid, Spain
- Occupation: Architect
- Awards: Spanish National Architecture Award (1996); Spanish National Urban Planning Award (1981); Spanish National Restoration Award (1980); Gold Medal Europa Nostra (1980); COAM (2016, 2005 and 1987)
- Practice: BAYON ARQUITECTOS
- Buildings: Red Eléctrica de España building in Seville. Expo 1992; Price Circus Madrid; Poblet Monastery Guesthouse; Office Building for the Spain’s General Management of Assets in Madrid; Spanish Civil Guard Officers Academy in Aranjuez
- Projects: Scenic Arts, Exhibitions and Congress buildings in Vitoria-Gasteiz

Mariano Bayón Álvarez (born September 25, 1942) is a Spanish architect.

== Life and career ==
Born in Madrid, Spain, Mariano Bayón graduated from the Superior Technical School of Architecture of Madrid (ETSAM) in 1968. Some of his major works are the Red Eléctrica de España building in Seville (1992),a sheet of white marble which draws out a rectangular space, thin and tense like a light bulb during the night; solid and weighty during the day, the Public Library in Villaverde, Madrid (1996) and the extension to the twelfth century Cistercian Poblet Monastery in Tarragona (2011).

Bayon's most recent works are the Office building for the Spain's General Management of Assets in Madrid (2015) and the new Spanish Civil Guard Officers Academy in Aranjuez (2016).

From 1975 to 2008, Bayón was Professor of Architectural Design Projects at Madrid's School of Architecture (ETSAM). He is the author of many essays on contemporary architecture and historical criticism, including confirmations of his design proposals or parallel illustrations to his design activity. He has organized and curated several exhibitions on twentieth century architecture and has participated in monographic and collective exhibitions.

Bayón has given lectures and presentations of his work in major European cultural and academic centers as well as in the United States and Brazil.

== Major works ==
Restoration of Royal Theater Coliseo Carlos II. San Lorenzo de El Escorial, Madrid. 1980. With architect José Luis Martín Gómez.

Experimental study for the remodel and addition of houses in Plaza de Cascorro 11, Madrid. 1981.

Volumen Building. Design and exhibition center. Algete, Madrid. 1986.

Parliament group of Spain's Congress of Deputies building in Plaza de las Cortes, Madrid. 1986.

Office building in Jesús de Monasterio St., Santander.1987.

Armando Palacio Valdés Theater. Department of Public Works. Avilés City Council, Asturias. 1988.

Housing block. Gran Vía de San Francisco St., Madrid City Council. 1989.

Housing blocks in UV-26. Palomeras, Madrid. 1990.

Red Eléctrica de España building in Seville. Seville Expo '92

Housing block in Divina Pastora St. Fuencarral, Madrid. 1990.

Museum of Spanish architecture Project in Madrid. 1994.

Shopping center and office building ABC in Serrano St., Madrid. 1995.

Public Library in Villaverde, Madrid. 1996.

Performing Arts and Music Center in Salamanca. 2002.

Circus Price Madrid. 2007.

112 dwellings. Public housing complex in Salburúa, Vitoria-Gasteiz. 2007.

131 dwellings. Public housing complex in Ensanche de Valleca, Madrid. 2007.

289 dwellings. Public housing complex in Ensanche de Vallecas, Madrid. 2008.

114 dwellings. Public Housing in Mariturri, Vitoria-Gasteiz. 2009.

Poblet Monastery Guesthouse, Tarragona. Spanish Department of Public Works. 2010.

211 dwellings. Public Housing complex in Ibaialde, Vitoria-Gasteizl. 2010.

Performing Arts, Exhibitions and Congress buildings in Vitoria-Gasteiz. 2011. (Works begun and cancelled).

Restoration of Royal Theater Coliseo Carlos III in Aranjuez, Madrid. Spanish Department of Public Works. 2012.

Office building for the Spain's General Management of Assets in Madrid. 2015.

Spanish Civil Guard Officers Academy in Aranjuez. 2016.

== Gallery ==
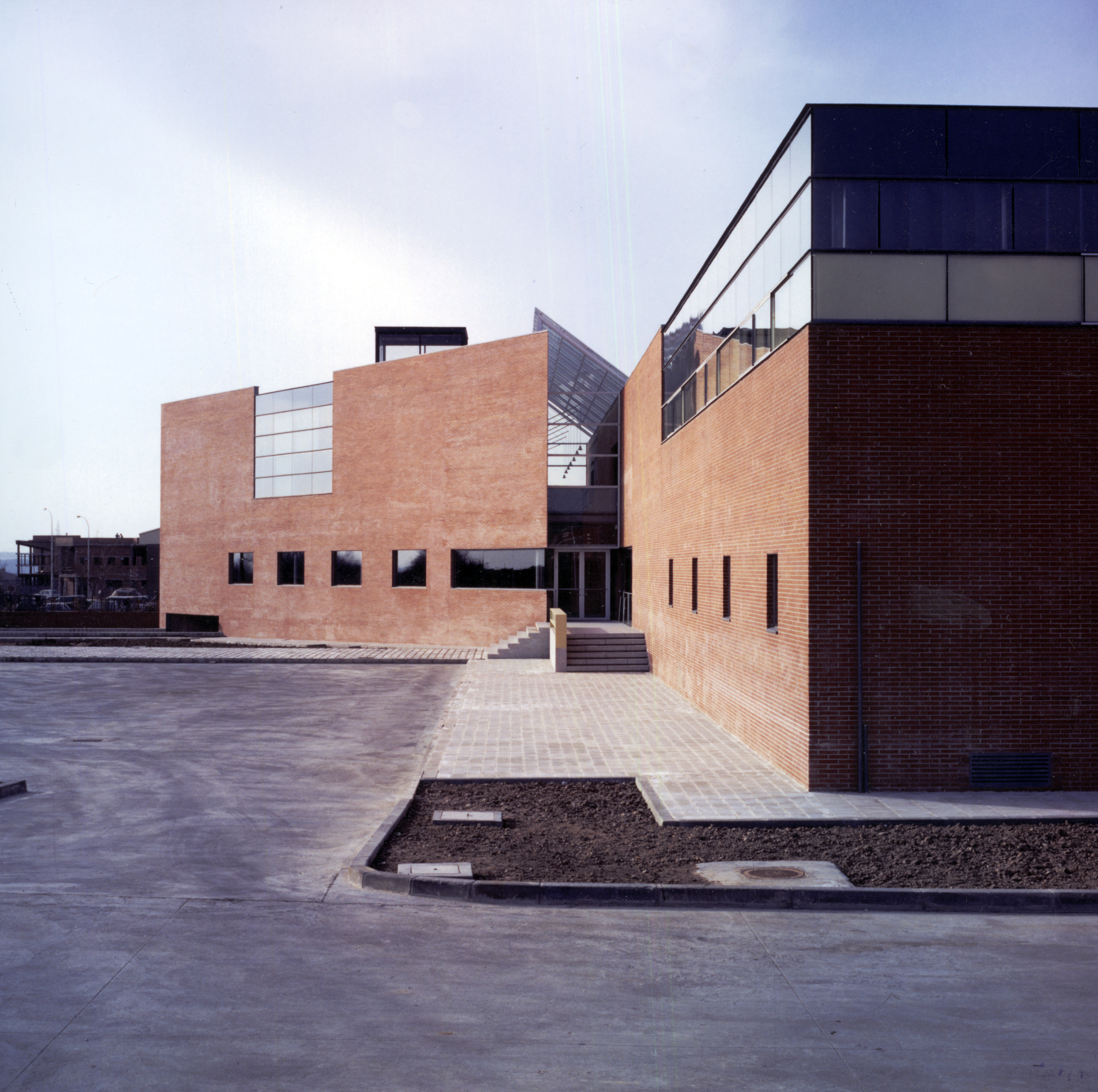
Design and exhibition center in Algete.1986

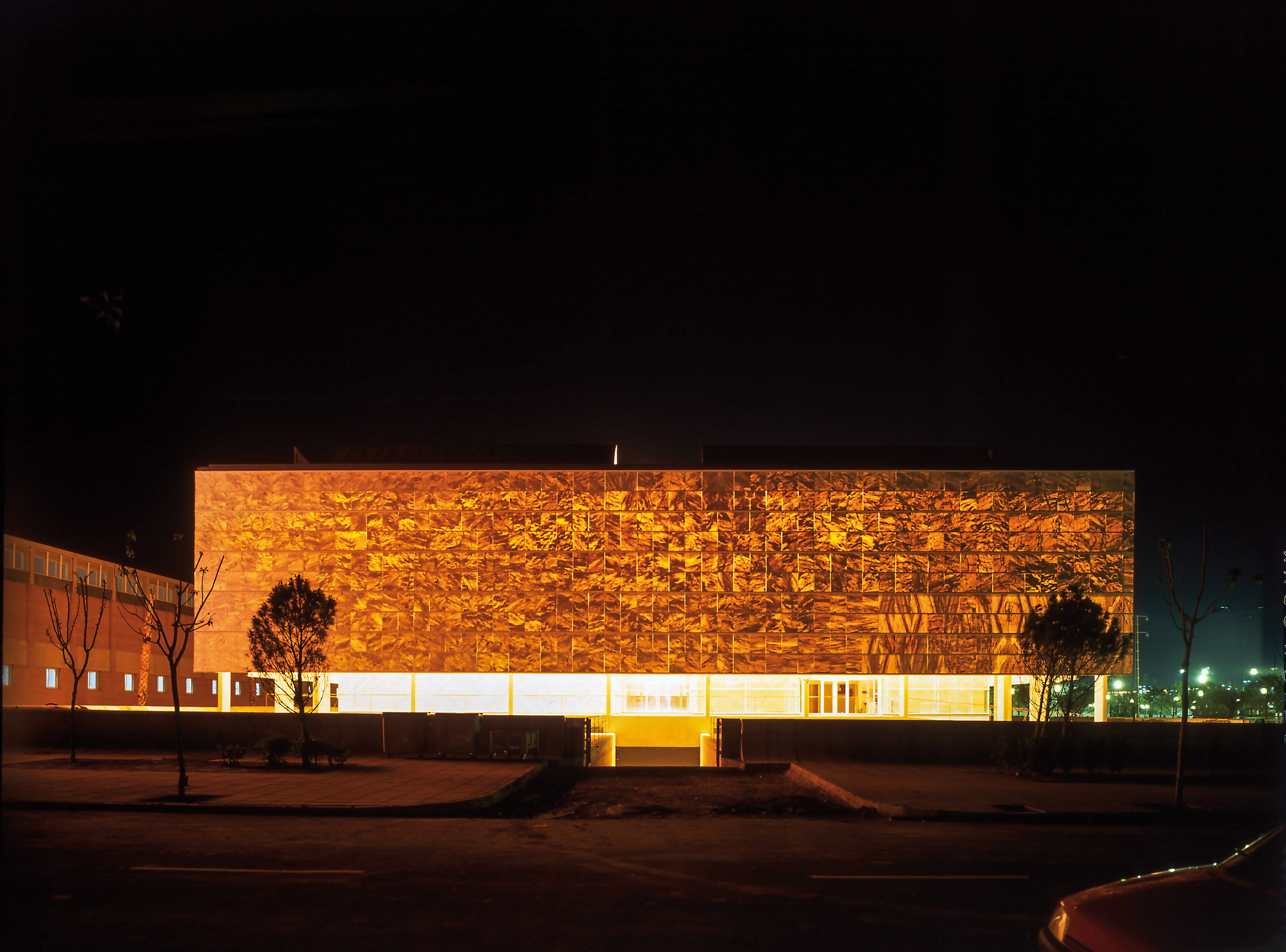
Red Eléctrica de España building in Seville.1992

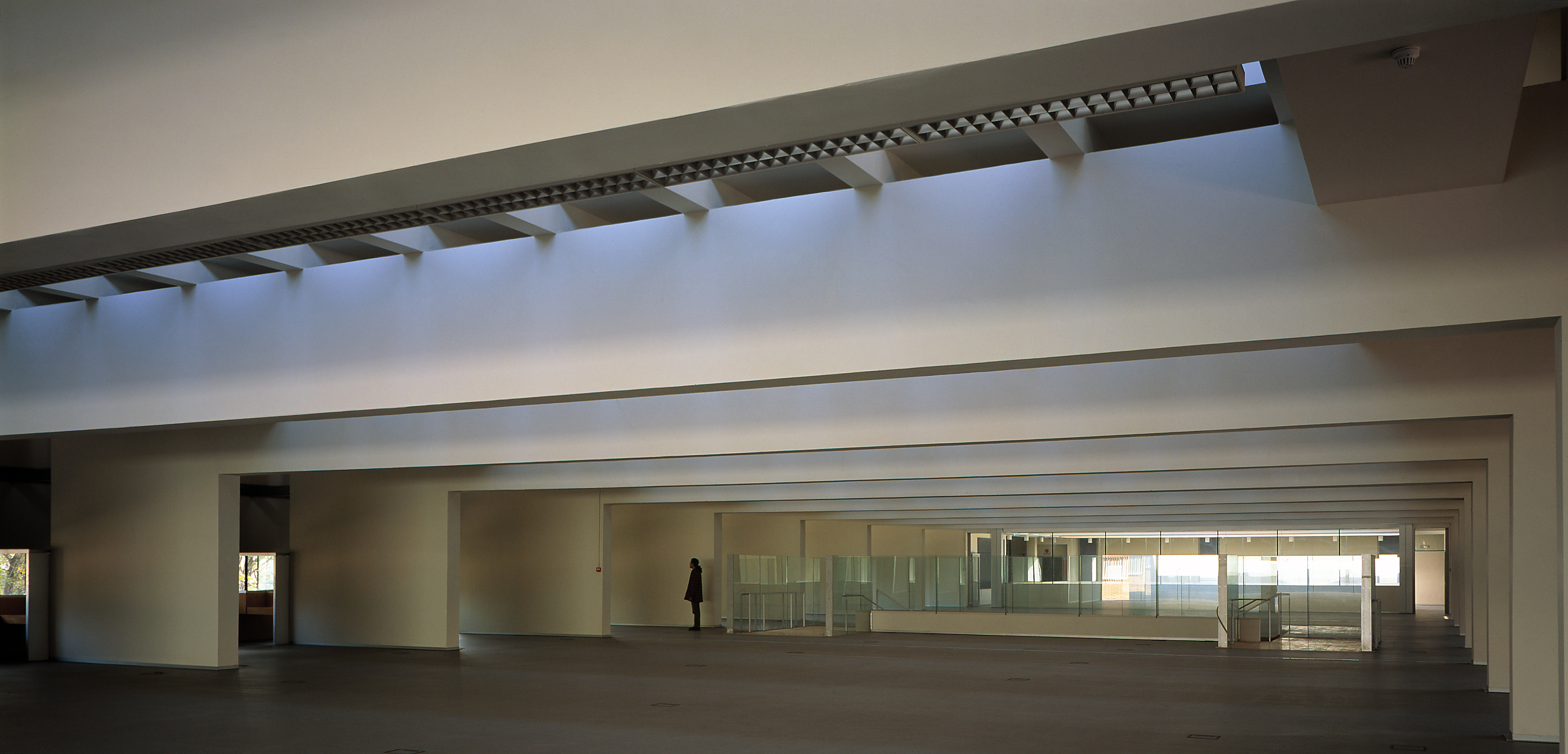
Public Library in Villaverde.1996

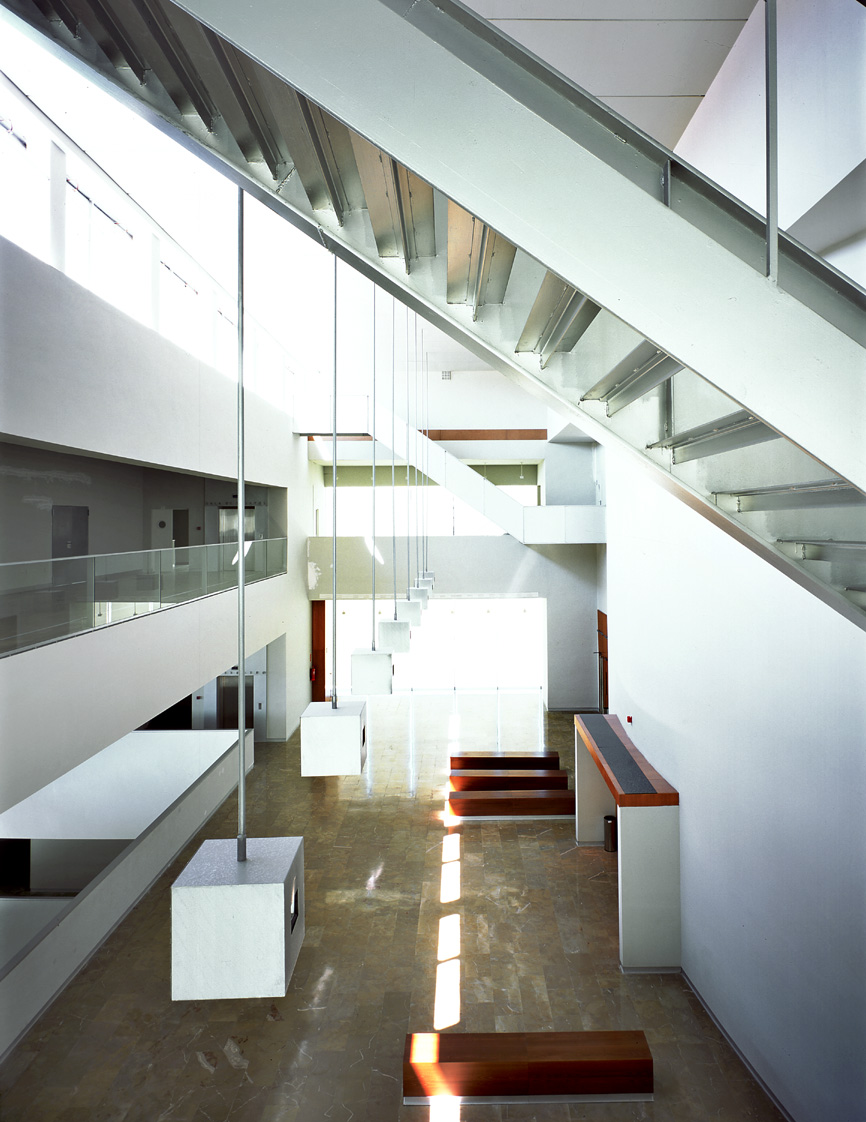
Performing Arts and Music Center in Salamanca.2002

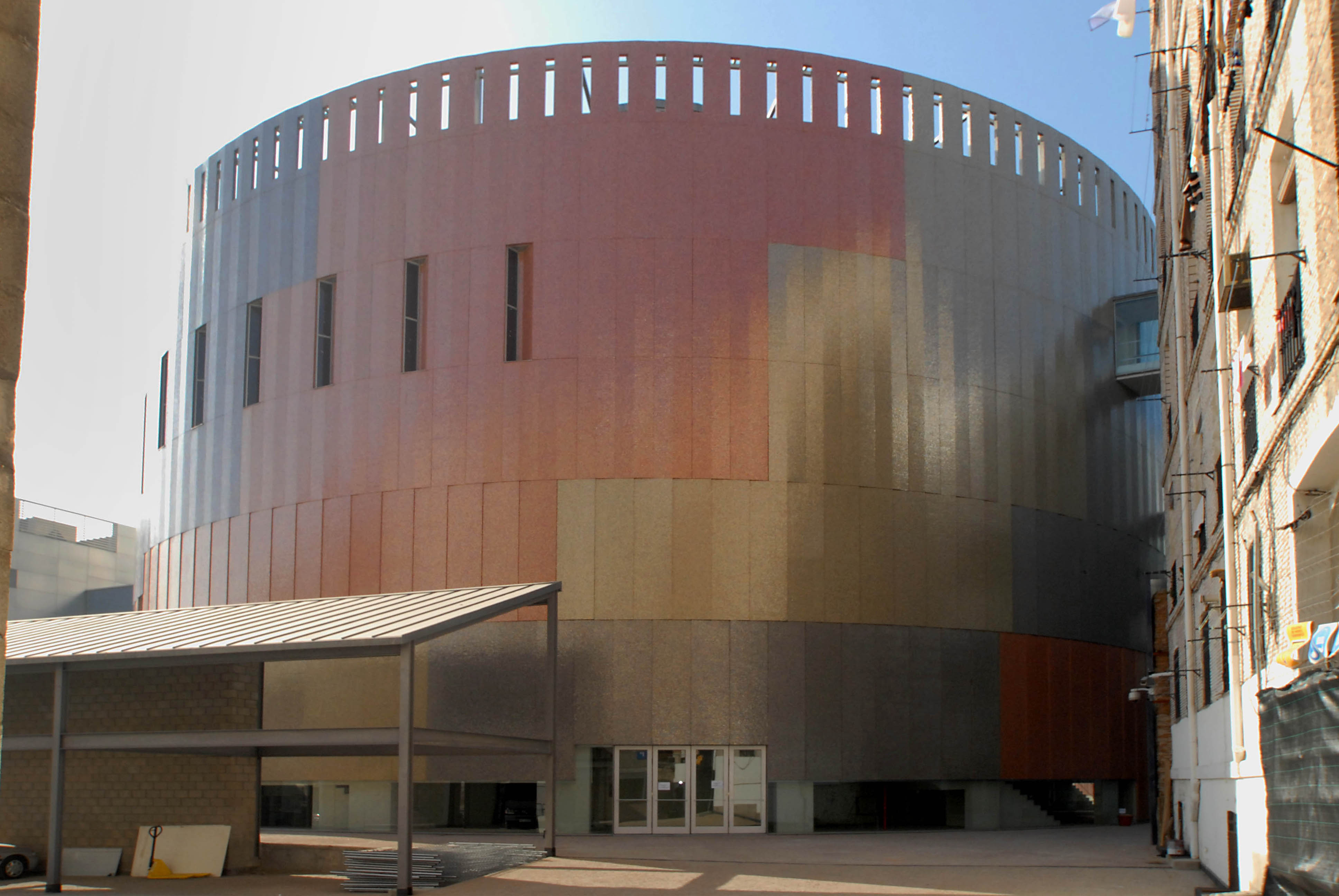
Price Circus Madrid. 2007

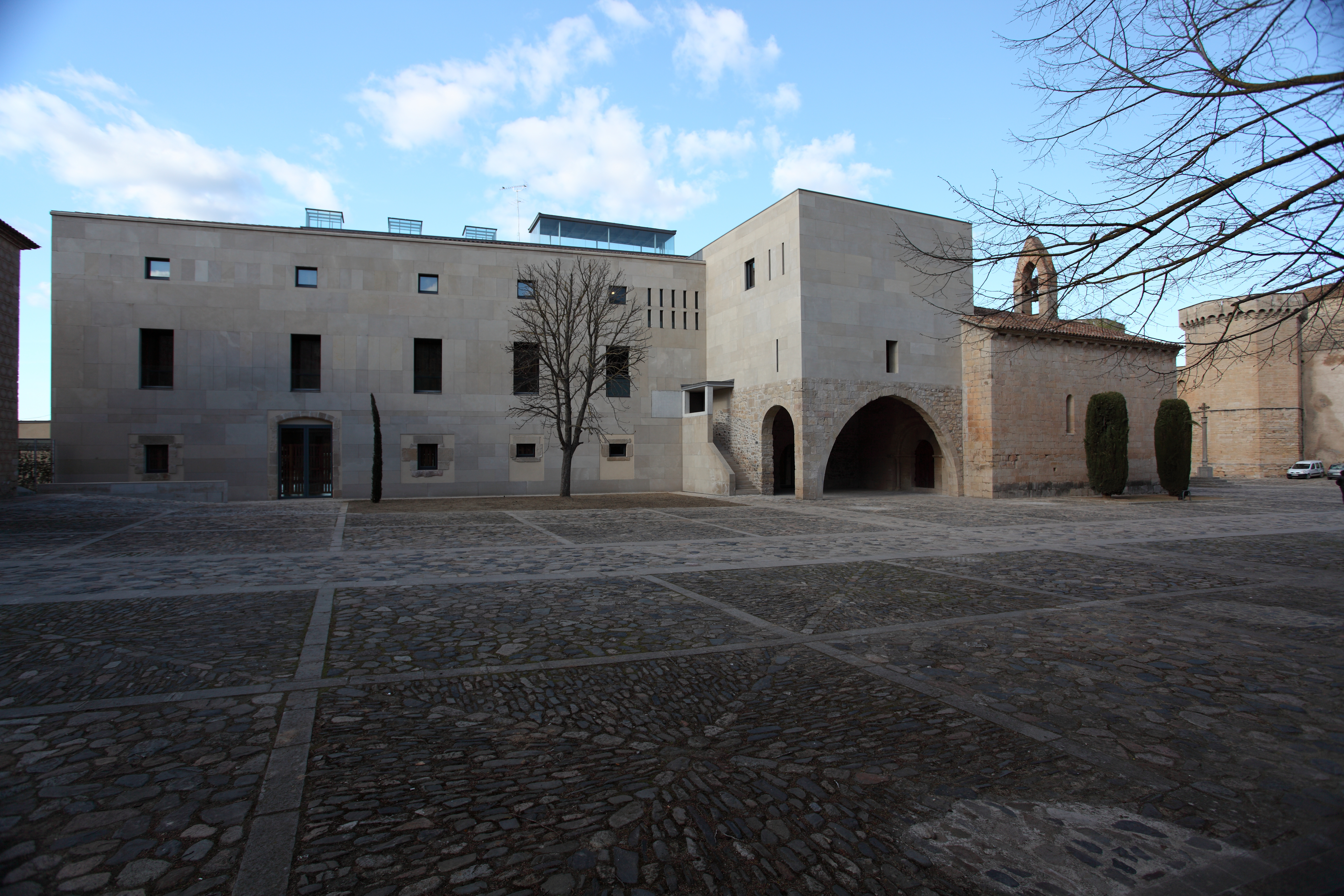
Poblet Monastery Guesthouse in Tarragona. 2010

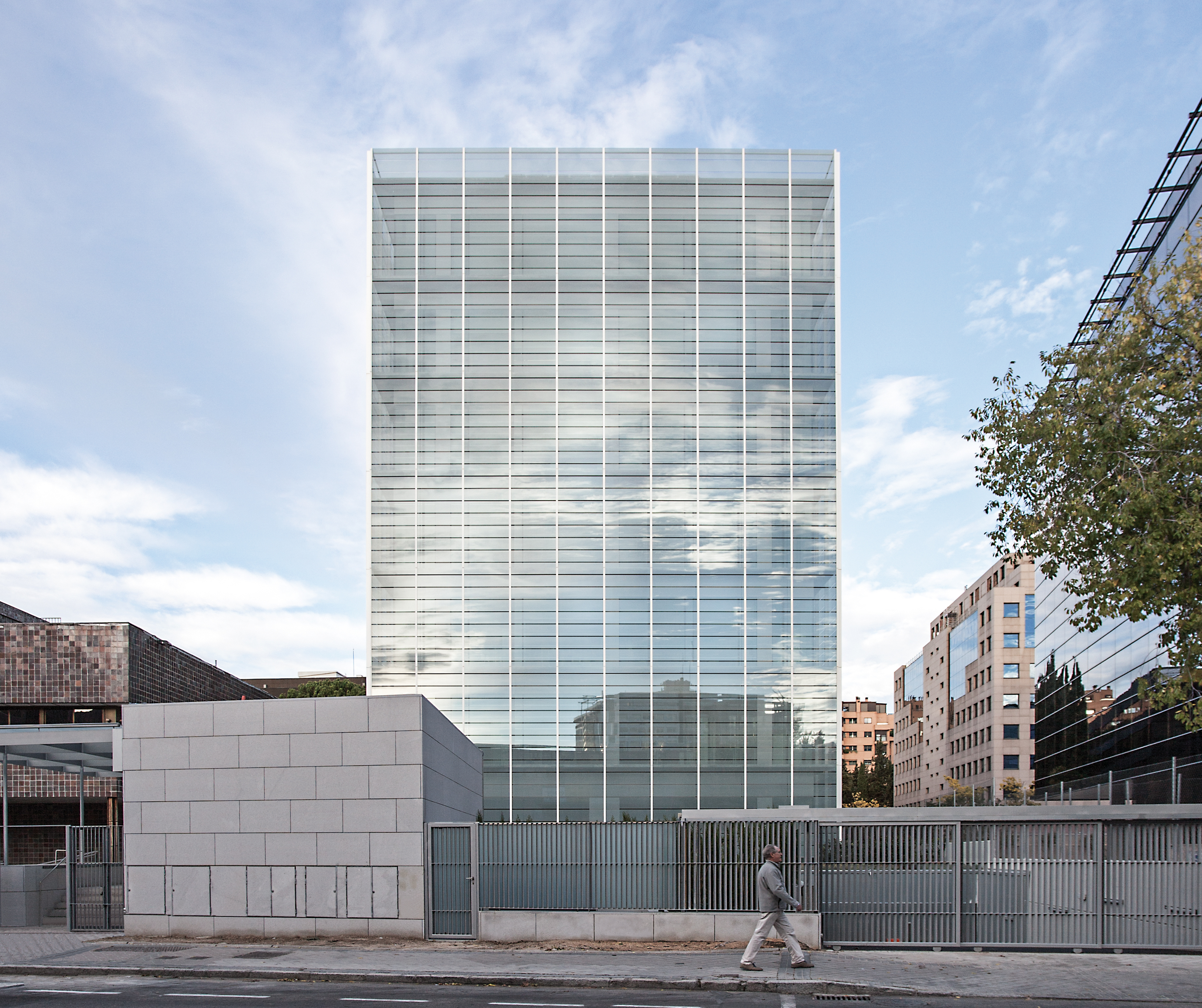
Office building for the Spain's General Management of Assets in Madrid. 2015

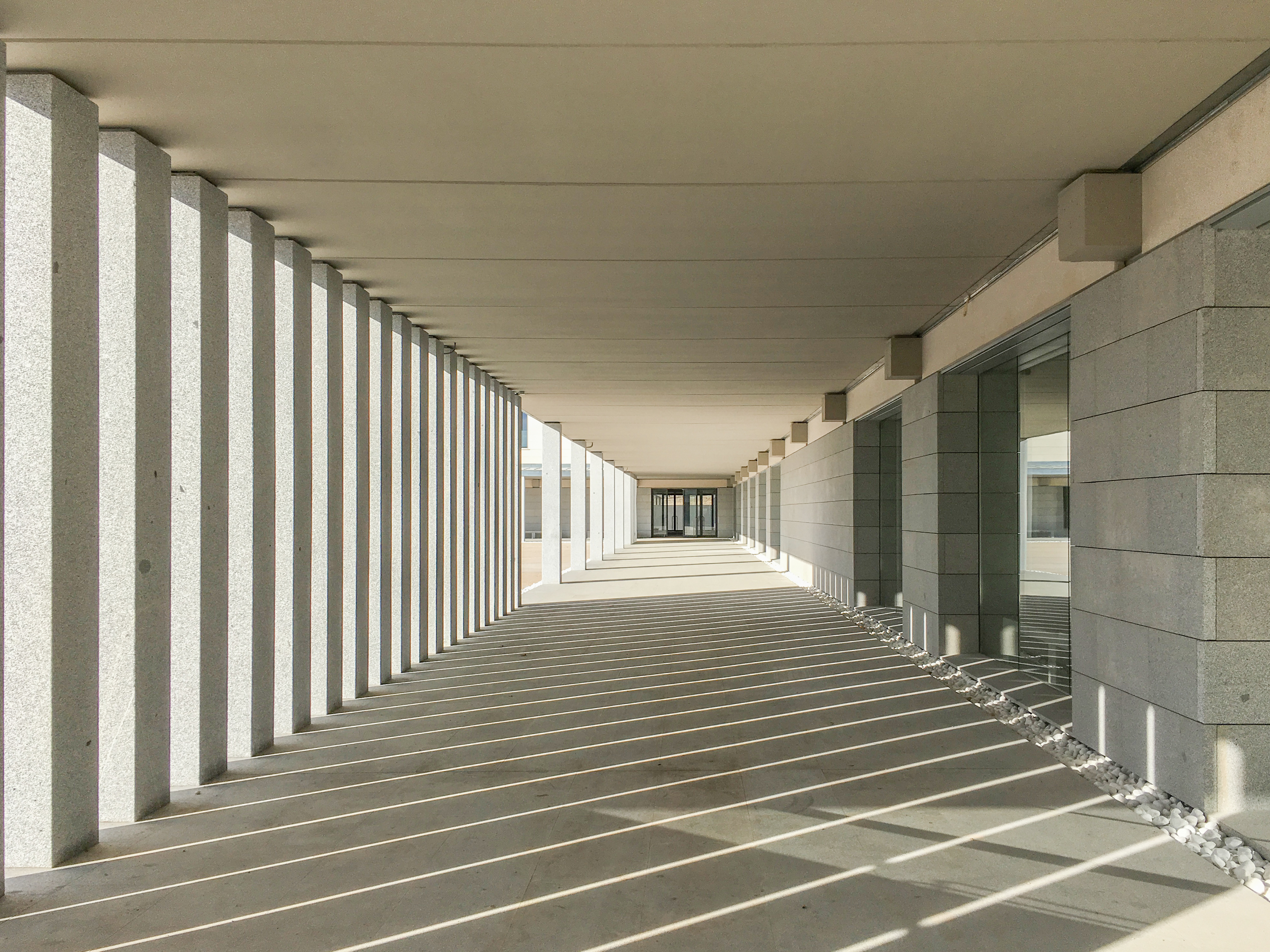
Spanish Civil Guard Officers Academy in Aranjuez. 2016

== Main awards ==
ePower&Building Award. Best solar shading system. 2016

CSCAE - Saint-Gobain Award. Architecture with glass. 2014.

COAM Awards. 2016, 2005 and 1987.

Architecture and Urban Planning Awards. Madrid City Council. 1987, 1990, 1991, 1994 and 2000.

PAD’96 Award. Construction with stone. 1996.

Spanish National Architecture Award. 1996.

Europa Nostra Awards.1986, 1987 and 1991.

Spanish National Urban Planning Award. 1981.

Spanish National Restoration Award. 1980.

Europa Nostra Award. Gold Medal.1980.

== Publications ==
BAYÓN, M (2004). Duiker. El Interior del CINEAC de Amsterdam. Madrid: Editorial Rueda. ISBN 84-7207-167-7

AA Arquitecturas de Autor. Works Mariano Bayón (1999), T6, Nº 11. Pamplona: T6 ediciones S.L. ISBN 84-89713-26-X

BAYÓN, M. (1992). Mariano Bayón Architektur 1991. Published for the exhibition of his work at ArchitekturGalerie am Weissenhof. Peter Behrenshaus. Stuttgart. 1992. Madrid: Siglo XXI de España editores. ISBN 84-323-0739-4

BAYÓN, M. (1990), ‘’Sobre Arne Jacobsen. A propósito’’ in Arquitectura Coam, Magazine of Architecture and Urban Planning of the Chamber of Architects of Madrid. Nº 283-284, p.134-159. Madrid: Editorial América Ibérica S.A

BAYÓN, M., MARTÍN, J L. (1988). El Real Coliseo de Carlos III. San Lorenzo del Escorial. Madrid: Comunidad de Madrid. Consejería de Cultura.

BAYÓN, M. (1984), ‘’La casa de L.Wittgenstein’’ en Arquitectura Coam, Magazine of Architecture and Urban Planning of the Chamber of Architects of Madrid. Nº 281, p.24-37. Madrid: Editorial América Ibérica S.A

BAYÓN, M. (1966), ‘’La Escuela de Ámsterdam’’ en Arquitectura Coam, Magazine of Architecture and Urban Planning of the Chamber of Architects of Madrid. Nº 90, p. 2-10. Madrid: Editorial América Ibérica S.A

MINISTERIO DE VIVIENDA (2005). Absent Architecture of the 20th Century. Madrid: Tanais Arquitectura. ISBN 978-8449601279
