= Organ of Poblet =

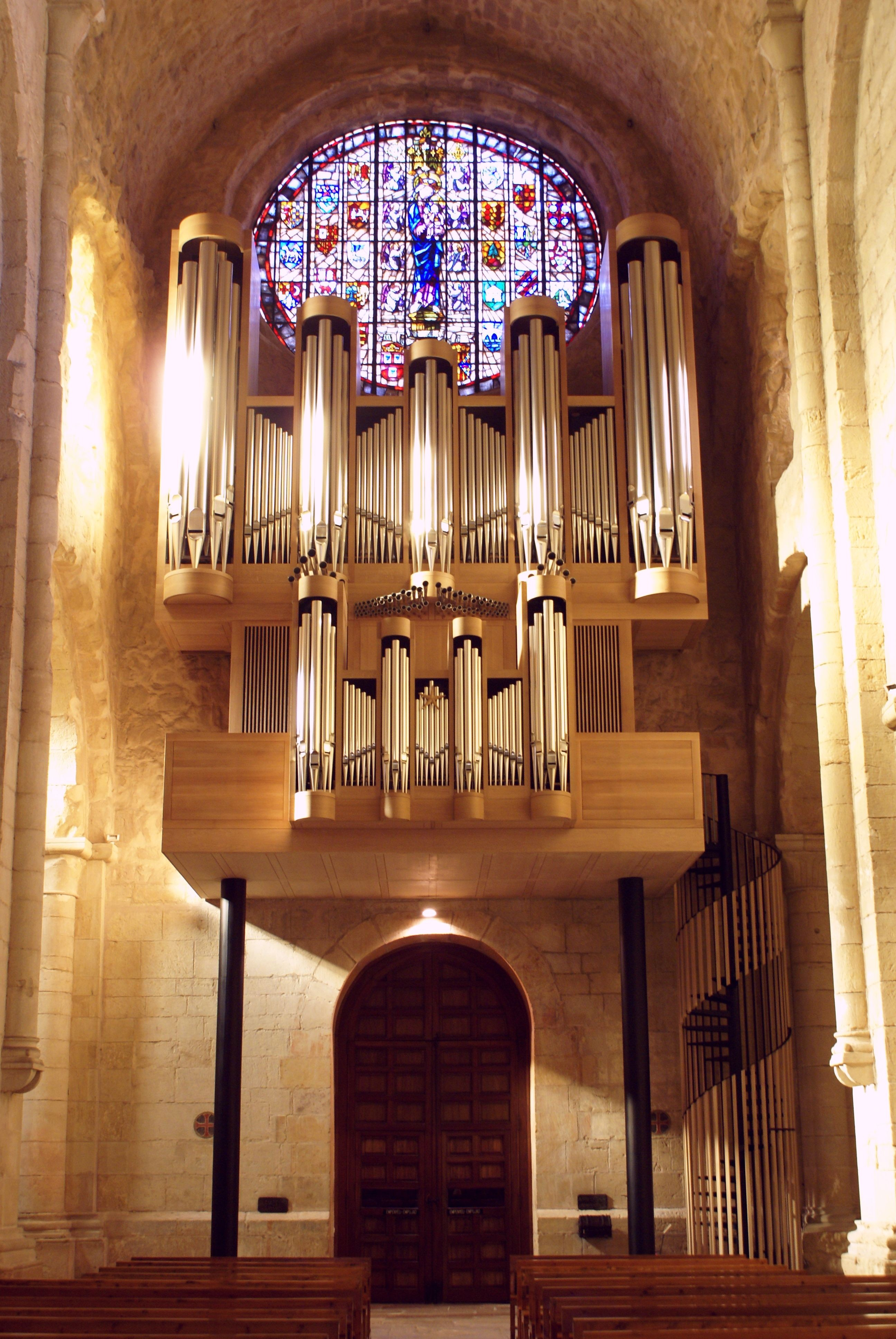
The Metzler organ of the Abbey of Poblet (Catalonia, 2012)

The organ of Poblet is a three manual, 56 stop pipe organ installed in the church of the Abbey of Santa Maria of Poblet (Catalonia, Spain). It was built in 2012 by the Swiss firm Metzler Orgelbau AG.

== Technical description and information ==
The instrument is entirely mechanical in both key and stop actions. The slider chests, case, pipe work and all components were manufactured directly by Metzler craftsmen under the supervision of the organ builder Joan Carles Castro (Barcelona). The instrument installation includes:

– 56 stops on a three manual console and pedalboard
– Approximately 3,500 pipes, whose lengths range from 5 meters down to the shortest at 1 centimetre.
– The dimensions of the instrument are:

Height: 8.70 m
Width: 7.20 m
Depth: 4.10 m

== Tonal conception ==
It is an instrument of interregional Baroque sound aesthetics, i.e., a well-balanced synthesis of the most significant features of the European organ schools of the Baroque era. The tonal design is based on the German Baroque style, centered in the music of J. S. Bach. However the instrument also includes bright reeds, mutations and fonds of French and Spanish character, and late Baroque elements. The voicing and tonal finishing were in charge of Andreas Metzler in consultation with the Abbey's main organist Josep Antoni Peramos, O. Cist.

== Specifications ==
I. Rückpositiv	(C-g3)	II. Hauptwerk	(C-g3)
Prestant	8'	Prestant	16'
Quintade	8'	Bourdon	16'
Bourdon	8'	Principal	8'
Octave	4'	Viola	8'
Rohrflöte	4'	Rohrflöte	8'
Nasard	2 2/3'	Octave	4'
Doublette	2'	Holzflöte	4'
Terz	1 3/5'	Quinte	2 2/3'
Larigot	1 1/3'	Superoctave	2'
Sesquialter	II	Mixtur major	IV
Scharf	IV	Mixtur minor	III
Trompete	8'	Cornet	V
Cromorne	8'	Fagott	16'
		Trompette	8'
Tremulant		Clairon	4'
Zimbelstern			
		Tremulant	
III. Unterwerk	(C-g3)	I – II	
		III – II	
Gambe	8'		
Unda maris	8'		
Hohlflöte	8'		
Holzgedackt	8'	P. Pedalwerk	(C-f1)
Prestant	4'		
Salicet	4'	Untersatz	32'
Traversflöte	4'	Principalbass	16'
Octave	2'	Subbass	16'
Waldflöte	2'	Octavbass	8'
Sifflöte	1'	Violabass (HW)	8'
Cornett	III	Choralbass	4'
Zimbel	III	Bauernflöte	2'
Oboe	8'	Rauschpfeife	V
Vox humana	8'	Bombarde	16'
		Fagott (HW)	16'
Tremulant		Trompete	8'
Rossignol		Trompete	4'
Batalla		I – P	
Trompeta	8'	II – P	
Clarín	4'	III – P	
		III 4' – P	

== See also ==
- Organ
- Abbey of Poblet
