= Circo Price =

Event venue in Madrid, Spain

Coordinates: 40°24′21″N 3°41′55″W

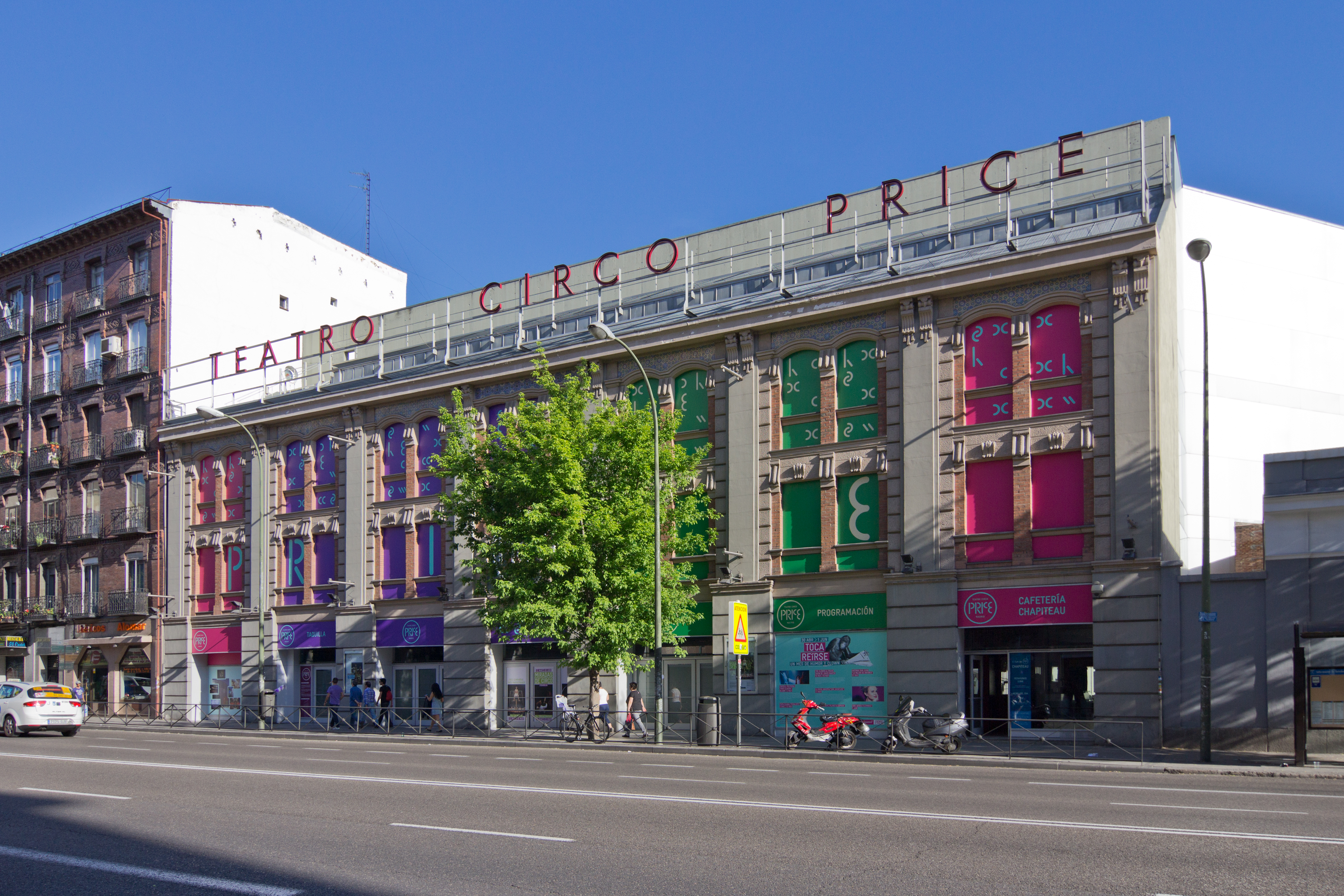
Teatro Circo Price in Madrid

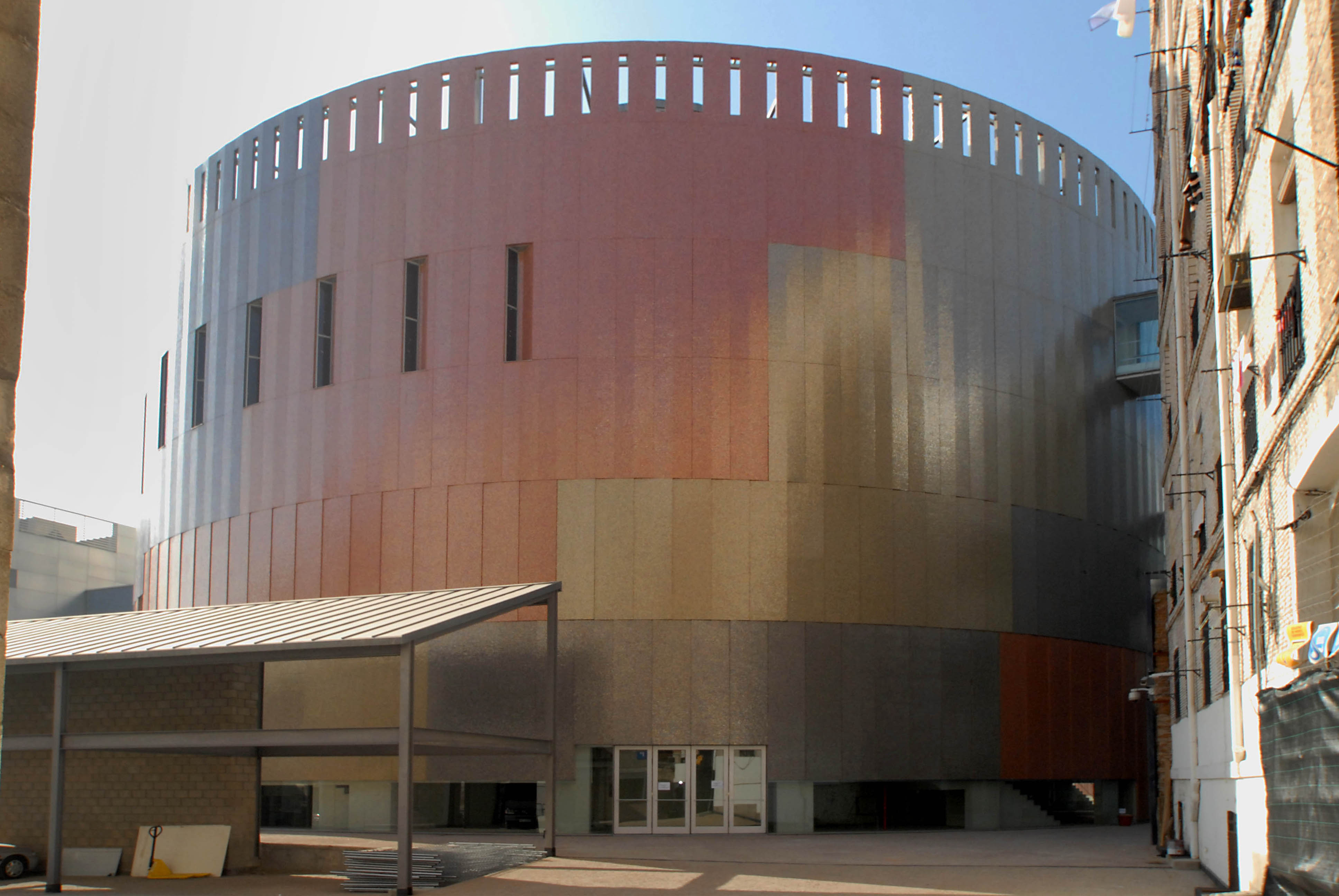
Price Circus Madrid. 2007. Architect Mariano Bayón.

The Circo Price, also known as El Price, is a 2,142-seat concert venue and former circus in Madrid.

The circus was originally located in the Jardin de las Delicias, a park which lay at the corner of the Paseo de Recoletos and the calle de la Veterinaria, now calle Barbara de Braganza. In 1880 the impresario Thomas Price, part of the English family of equilibrist clowns, the Price Brothers obtained permissions to construct a permanent circus hall and theatre in the Plaza del Rey.

It was for many years colloquially known as the "Circo de Parish" after its manager Leonard Parish (d. 1930), who followed in his father's (William Parish) footsteps. During this period the theatre became a major venue for zarzuelas.
