= Ramon Martí i Martí =

Catalan master metalsmith (1917 – 2011)

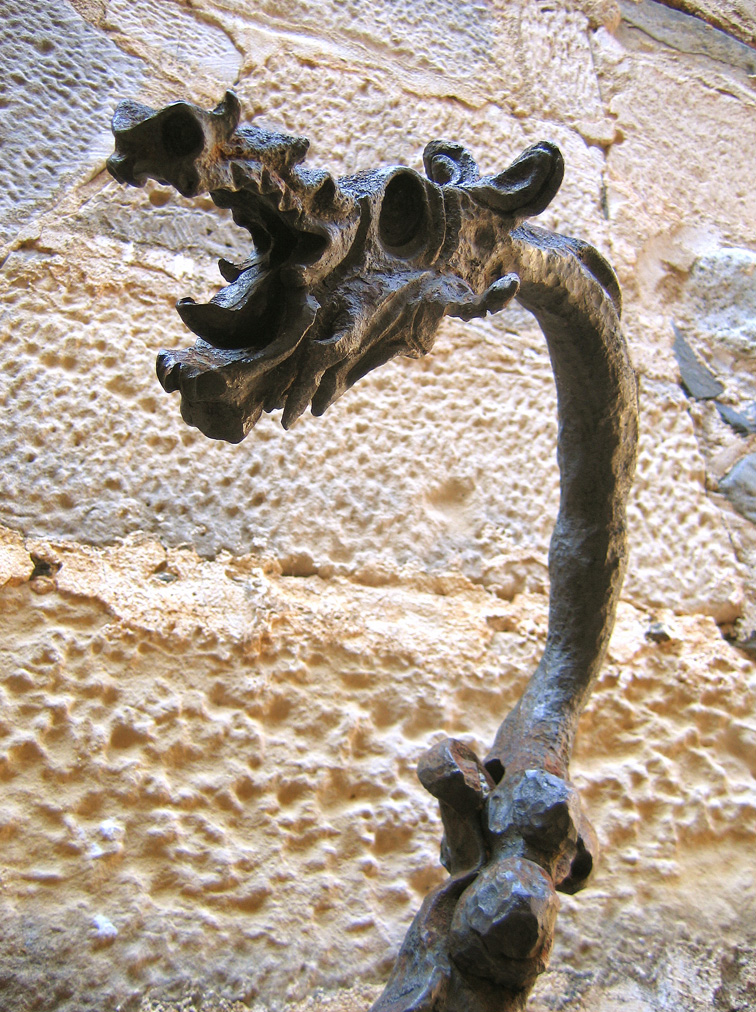
Dragon's head (detail) from the dragon stair rail at Poblet

Ramon Martí i Martí (20 March 1917 – 1 April 2011) was a Catalan master metalsmith.

Martí was born on 20 March 1917 in L'Espluga de Francolí to the blacksmith Enric Martí i Miquel and his wife Antònia Martí i Rosell. His father was the founder of the Cal Biel forge. In 1931, Martí entered the Escoles Professionals dels Pares Salesians de Sarrià, a trade school in Barcelona run by the Salesians. In 1951, he married Dolors Canudes i Canalda, with whom he had a daughter, Maria Lluïsa, and a son, Valentí.

Martí made many objects for Poblet Abbey, including chandeliers, candlesticks, tabernacles, braziers, crucifixes, doors, guardrails and a dragon-shaped handrail. One of his crucifixes was featured in Time in 1960. He mainly worked in wrought iron. In 1986, he was named master blacksmith of the Generalitat de Catalunya. In 1997 Martí was awarded with the Golden Badge of the Past Pupils of Don Bosco. He died on 1 April 2011 in L'Espluga. His son succeeded him at the head of Cal Biel.
