= L'Espluga de Francolí =

- Municipality
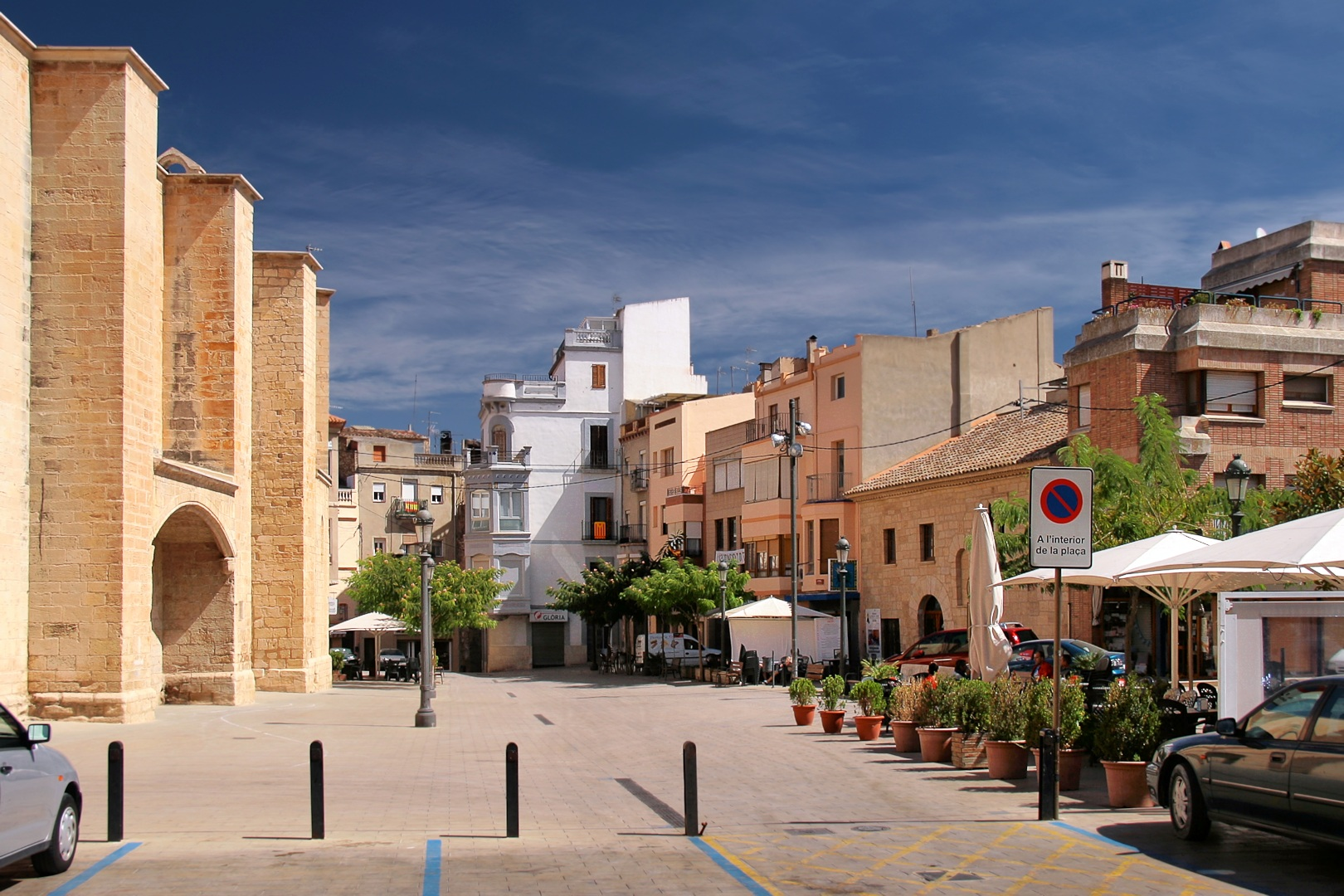

- Coat of arms

- Location in Catalonia
- Coordinates: 41.397°N 1.1033°E
- Country: Spain
- Autonomous community: Catalonia
- Province: Tarragona
- Comarca: Conca de Barberà

Government
  - Mayor: Josep M. Vidal (2019) (SOM-AM)

Area
  - Total: 57.0 km^{2} (22.0 sq mi)

Population (2025-01-01)
  - Total: 3,863
  - Density: 67.8/km^{2} (176/sq mi)
- Time zone: UTC+1 (CET)
  - Summer (DST): UTC+2 (CEST)
- Website: www.esplugadefrancoli.cat

L'Espluga de Francolí (Catalan pronunciation: [ləsˈpluɣə ðə fɾəŋkuˈli]) is a village in the province of Tarragona and autonomous community of Catalonia, Spain. It has a population of 3,863 (register office, 2025).

The municipality contains Cova de la Font Major, a cave visited as a tourist attraction. In 2026 researchers reported a side gallery containing 280 engraved motifs, including 55 animal figures thought to be more than 19,000 years old.

The blacksmith Ramon Martí i Martí was a native of L'Espluga de Francolí.

== Archaeology ==
In November 2026, researchers reported the identification of 280 Palaeolithic graphic motifs inside Cova de la Font Major, part of an extensive karst cave system at L'Espluga de Francolí. The discovery was made during archaeological investigations in 2019 by researchers from the Catalan Institute of Human Palaeoecology and Social Evolution (IPHES-CERCA). The findings were published in the journal Antiquity. The documented assemblage consists of 280 individual graphic elements, including 55 animal representations. The figures depict horses, deer, bovids, caprines and a bear, while the remaining motifs include parallel and converging lines, circular forms, loops and geometric patterns. Radiocarbon dating of charcoal recovered from an engraved groove, together with stylistic analysis, indicates that the artwork dates to approximately 26,000 years ago, during the Upper Palaeolithic. The researchers suggest that many of the motifs belong to pre-Magdalenian phases of Upper Palaeolithic artistic production.
