= Guillem Seguer =

Guillem Seguer was a Catalan sculptor and architect active in the mid-14th century.

One of his first known works is a contract in 1342 for a Virgin with Child in the parish church of Vinaixa, destroyed during the Spanish Civil War. A "Virgin with Child" from Seguer is today in the Metropolitan Museum of New York City, United States. Also disappeared in 1936 is "Mary Magdalene" once in Montblanc.

Seguer was director of the works, also contributing as sculptor, during the construction of the La Seu Vella Cathedral of Lleida. From him is the sepulchre of bishop Ponç de Vilamur, of which only fragments remain. He also contributed in the Monastery of Santa María de Vallbona.

== Sources ==
- "Escultura". L'art Gòtic a Catalunya (in Catalan). 2007. ISBN 978-84-412-0892-6.
