= Catalan Gothic =

Artistic style

Catalan Gothic is an artistic style, with particular characteristics in the field of architecture. It occurred in the Principality of Catalonia within the Crown of Aragon between the 13th and 15th centuries, which places it at the end of the European Gothic period and at the beginning of the Renaissance. The term Catalan Gothic is confined to Barcelona and its area of influence (Girona, Northern Catalonia, Balearic Islands, etc.), which has its own characteristics.

Despite its name, Catalan Gothic differs from the Gothic styles from other parts of Europe. In architecture, it does not seek excessive height, or have highlights in its flying buttresses, and its decoration is sober.

== Historical context ==
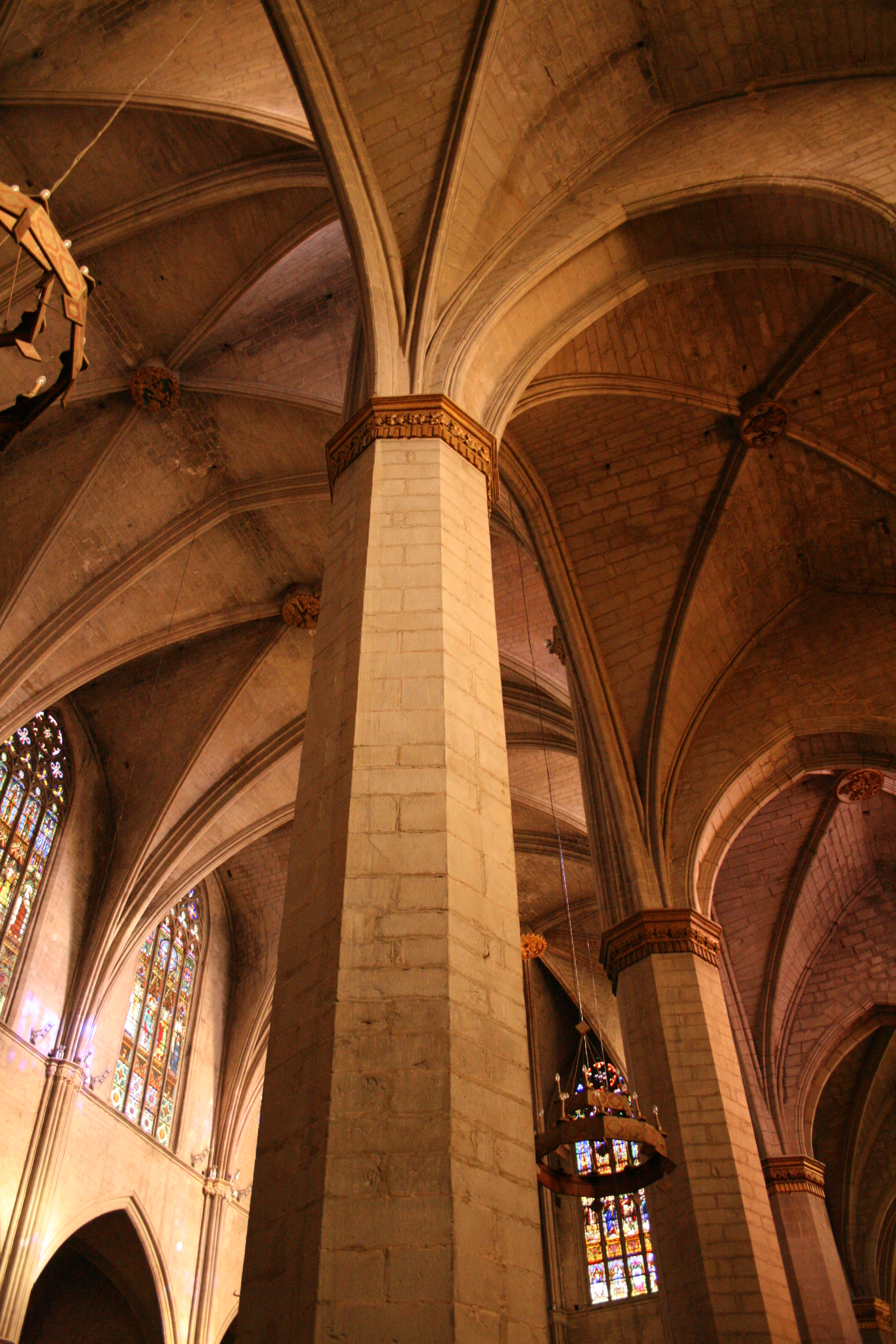
Vaults of the central and lateral side of Santa Maria de Manresa.

The style began because of the wealth generated by the expansion of the Counts of Barcelona and Crown of Aragon, first to the Languedoc and Balearic Islands, then across the Mediterranean Sea to Sicily, Sardinia, the Kingdom of Naples and the Duchy of Athens. This resulted in a demand for an updating of existing Romanesque buildings and new public buildings as well as a demand for mansions for the newly enriched. The style reached its climax in the 15th century. After the union of the Crowns of Castile and Aragon, and the discovery of the Americas, Seville became Spain's major port, to the detriment of Barcelona.

== Artistic context ==
The terms "Gothic style" and "Gothic city" are used in relation to the local time frame. It is not to be confused with Spanish or other Gothic styles, though the latest available technologies were always employed. There are many differences in, for example, the arch, rose window and struts.

In church architecture, Catalan Gothic does not strive for great heights, but tends to balance dimensions of width with height, so there are no long sloping roofs so characteristic of central and northern Europe, and its buttresses are as tall as the naves. The naves are quite wide, in the Girona cathedral, for instance, being the widest in gothic history, in contrast to English gothic, which has some of the longest naves. The buttresses penetrate into the building to form inner structural spaces as well (side chapels). Buildings also have fewer windows because the Mediterranean light is much stronger than the rest of Europe. Sparsely decorated, they have no figurative motifs on their pillars and no notable intricacy in their vaults. The vaults tend to have large, sculpted and painted keystones, however.

The main features of Catalan Gothic, compared with international Gothic, are:

Catalan Gothic	International Gothic
Unitary spaces	Compartmentalised spaces
Compact and smooth exterior forms	Exterior forms to varying depths
Large smooth surfaces where the body of the structure is marked with moldings	Lack of smooth surfaces
Use of wooden decks on diaphragm arches	Little use of this technique
Horizontality	Verticality
Finished towers on flat roofs	Pinnacles and needles
Bell tower independent or above the crossing or the apse	Pair of bell towers in the western façade
Great formal purity	Decorativism and structural upheaval
Near elimination of transepts	Prominent transepts
Buttresses that go through to interior, creating structural spaces	External flying buttresses
Chapels between the buttresses	Exterior buttresses
Flatter roofs	Slanted rooftops
Predominantly full of gaps	Most gaps filled
Little importance of stained glass	Great importance of stained glass
Three naves equal in height creating sensation of a single nave	Big difference in height between naves
Delight in a single nave	Little use of the only nave
Great separation between pillars	Little separation between pillars
Use of the arch over the ogive	Almost exclusive use of the ogive
Octagonal plan for items such as pillars, towers, domes	Little use of the octagonal plan
Typically very wide nave	Not as wide. English Gothic: long
Large ribbed-vault keystones	Smaller ribbed-vault keystones

In sculpture and painting the peculiarities of Catalan Gothic are not as marked and as distinctive as either the Italian or Flemish styles. Nevertheless, there are several notable painters, including Ferrer Bassa, Pere Serra, Lluís Borrassà, Bernat Martorell, Lluís Dalmau and Jaume Huguet.

== Typology ==
=== Church ===
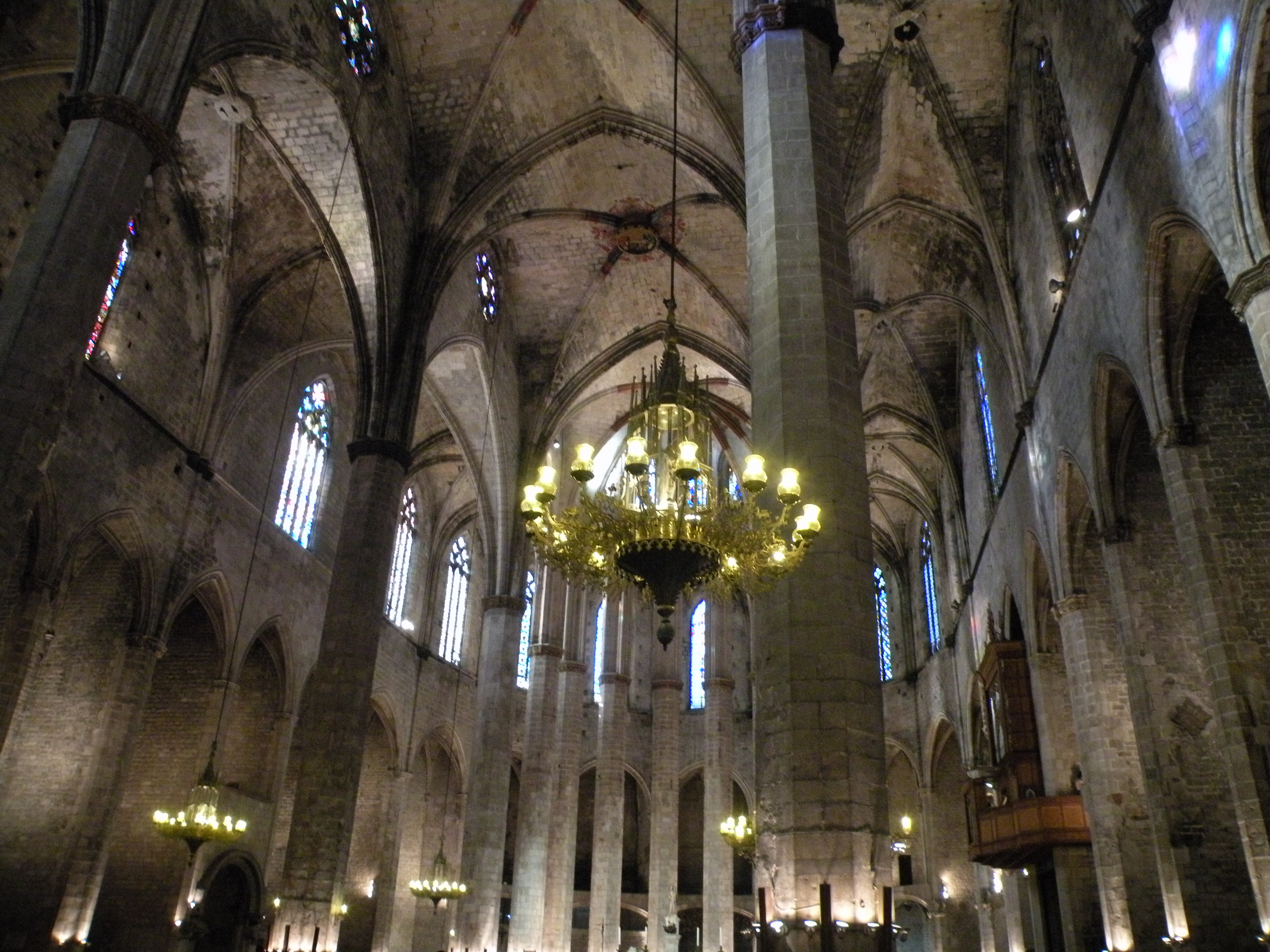
Interior view of Santa Maria del Mar, the quintessential example of pure Catalan Gothic.

Sacred architecture tends to unify space, which is achieved through two methods: either with slender and thin columns spaced far enough apart to avoid interruption the view of the side aisles, which are often the same height as the nave, or constructing with a single nave of much wider span. The towers, usually one or two, stand out as smooth polygonal prisms (six sides, eight sides), and there are no transepts, though churches based on the Templar design, are planned as Greek crosses.

The abutments have two effects in addition to their role in bracing the walls. On the drawing the chapels can be distinguished, and the elevation of the building is continuous and visually smooth on the outside. When these appear on the main facade (usually the West front), they create a rectangle that frames the doorway and perhaps a rose window.

=== Palace ===
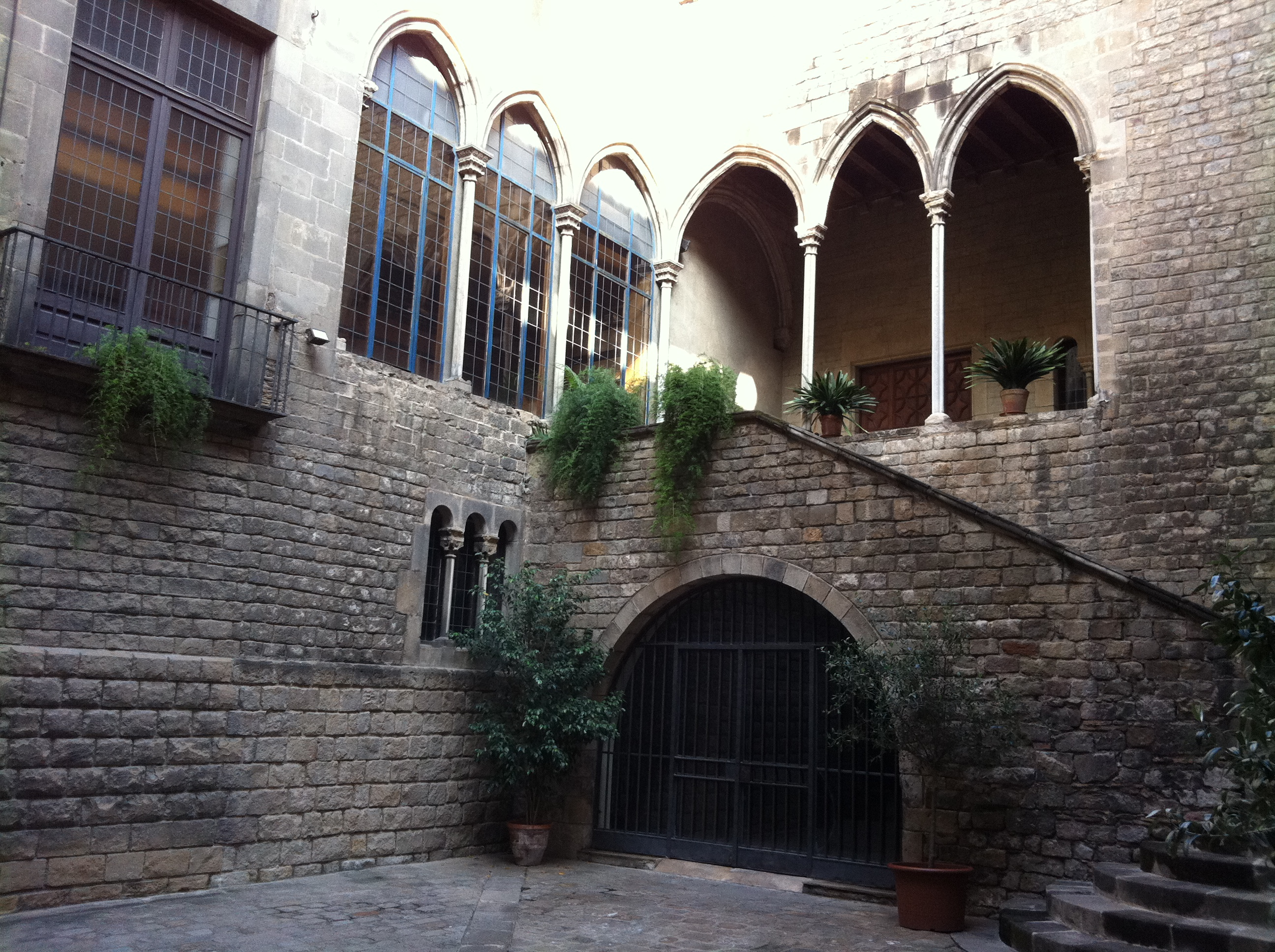
View of a typical courtyard with stairs in the Requesens Palace, located in the Gothic Quarter of Barcelona.

The palace, with a larger street wall than other dwellings, is typical of 15th-century bourgeois spaces, the best examples of which are in the Carrer de Montcada in Barcelona's Ribera district. The building is accessed through a portal and is characterised by a courtyard, which is the centre of the building and contains the main staircase that is either open or half closed.

On the ground floor are the facilities for doing business and there may be an office on a mezzanine. The first floor is reserved for living, with main hall, richly decorated stretching along the facade, sometimes occupying it entirely. The following storey contains service rooms and secondary units. Some palaces have small towers for watching over the city rooftops.

=== Llotja ===
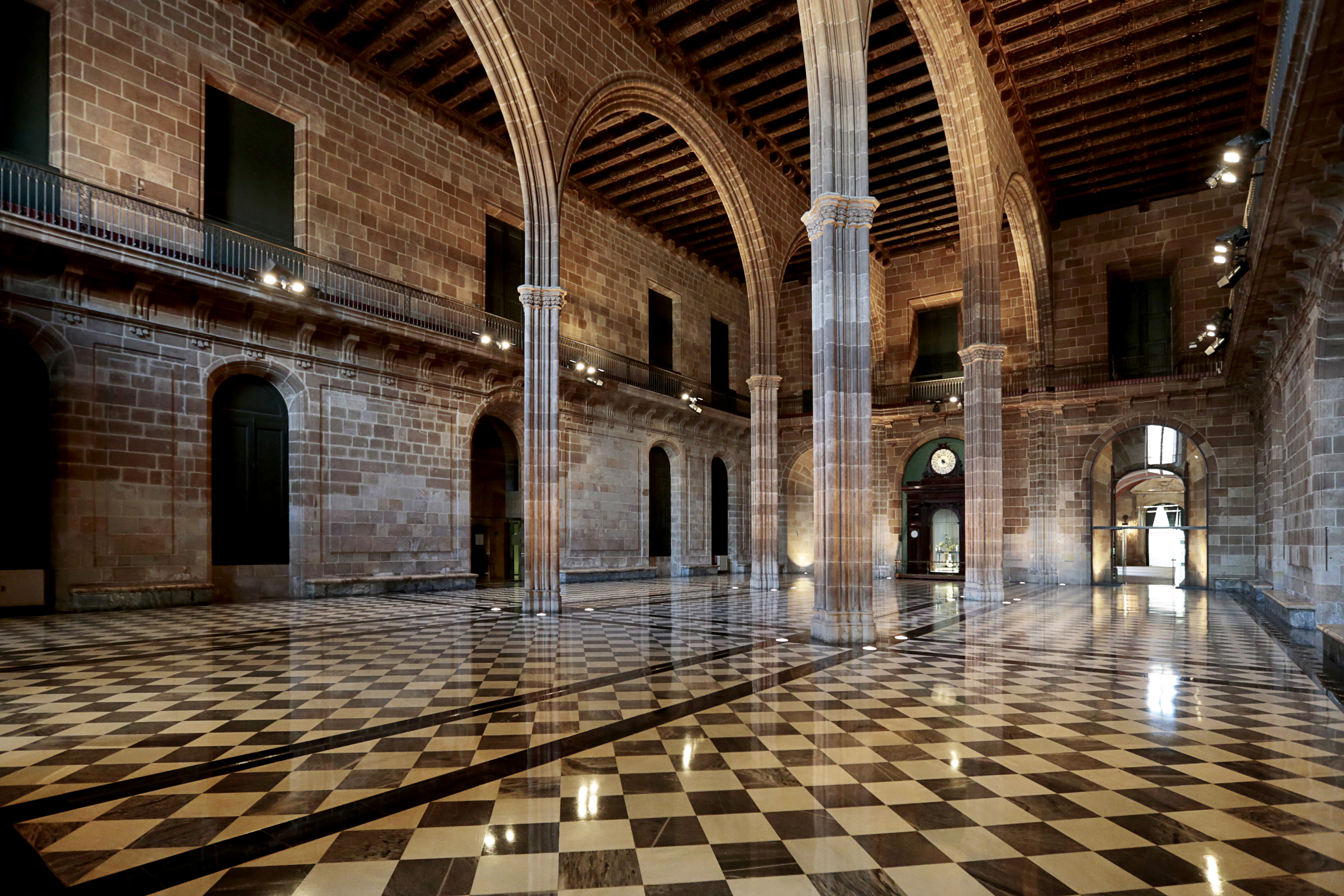
The gothic Contracting Hall at the Llotja de Barcelona.

During the 15th century the Catalan Gothic was used in civil architecture, best exemplified in the Llotja de Barcelona, built between 1380 and 1392. This llotja consisted of three naves separated by ogival arches resting on columns with beaded and flat roofs built in wood. Many features of the Llotja of Barcelona were replaced in the 18th century by a Neoclassical style.

== Examples ==
Examples of this type of architecture are the Cathedral of Barcelona, begun in 1298 or the Cathedral of Girona, started in 1312, which has three naves leading to the crossing where it continues as a single width. Its technical difficulties had to be addressed by a board or architects sent by the Crown of Aragon. Other good examples are:

- Santa Maria del Mar, in Barcelona.
- Palau Reial Major, in Barcelona.
- Monastery of Pedralbes, in Barcelona.
