= Gothic altarpiece of Santes Creus =

Gothic altarpiece by Guerau Gener and Lluís Borrassà

- Artist: Guerau Gener & Lluís Borrassà
- Year: 1407–1411
- Type: gothic altarpiece
- Dimensions: 460 cm × 500 cm (180 in × 200 in)
- Location: Museu Nacional d'Art de Catalunya and Catedral de Tarragona, Barcelona & Tarragona

The Gothic altarpiece of Santes Creus is an altarpiece painted by Guerau Gener and Lluís Borrassà between 1407 and 1411. It is one of the key works of the International Gothic altarpieces in Catalonia, created for the Santes Creus Monastery. The MNAC museum retains the Nativity, crowned by the figure of St. John the Evangelist, and the Resurrection of Christ, while the rest of the tables are kept in one of the chapels of the cathedral of Tarragona. The altarpiece was commissioned to Pere Serra but apparently died without starting it. Guerau Gener, a connoisseur of València international Gothic, replaced him; after Gener's death, Lluís Borrassà, one of the major figures in the painting of the first international Catalan Gothic, completed the project.
