= Saint John Altarpiece =

Saint John Altarpiece may refer to:

- Saint John Altarpiece (Memling)
- Saint John Altarpiece (van der Weyden)
- Altarpiece of the Saints John
