= Vilaseca =

Vilaseca is a surname. Notable people with the surname include:

- Andrés Vilaseca (born 1991), Uruguayan rugby union player
- Armando Vilaseca, Cuban-American former Commissioner of the Vermont Department of Education
- Bonanat de Vilaseca, Catalan abbot
- Josep Vilaseca i Casanovas (1848-1910), Catalan architect and artist
- Santiago Vilaseca (born 1984), Uruguayan rugby union player
