= Santes Creus =

Former Cistercian monastery in Catalonia, Spain

Coordinates: 41°20′50″N 1°21′46″E

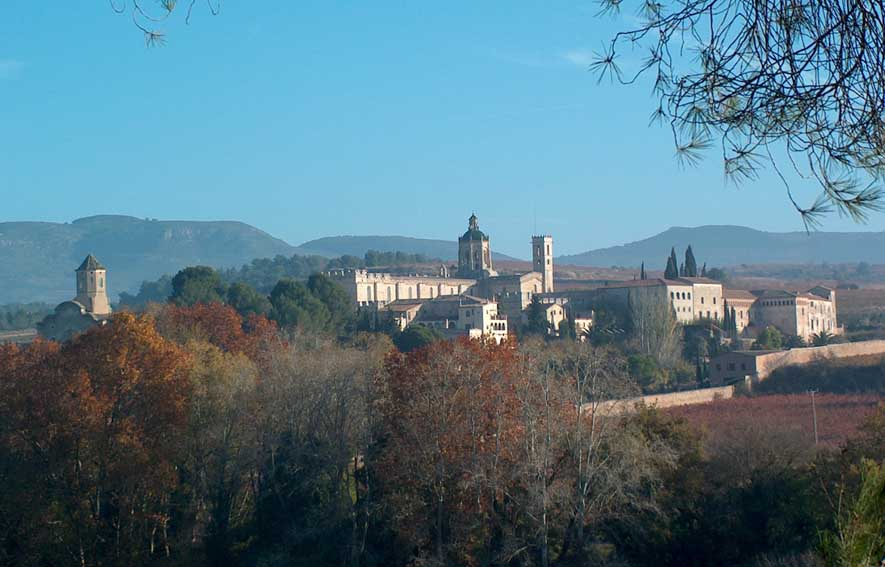
View of the monastery.

The Monastery of Santa Maria de Santes Creus, (Catalan: Reial Monestir de Santa Maria de Santes Creus) is a former Cistercian monastery in the municipality of Aiguamúrcia, Catalonia, Spain. The abbey was erected in the 12th century, in today's municipality of Aiguamúrcia, in the village of Santes Creus, in the province of Tarragona (Catalonia). However, it was in the thirteenth century when Peter III of Aragon expressed his desire to be buried in the monastery and a royal crypt was built for himself and his son, King James II that many of the local nobility established the custom to choose this place for burial. This increased the monastery's wealth and power due to the numerous donations received.

Santes Creus along with Vallbona de les Monges and Poblet Monastery are known as the Cistercian triangle, that helped consolidate power in Catalonia in the 12th century.

== History ==
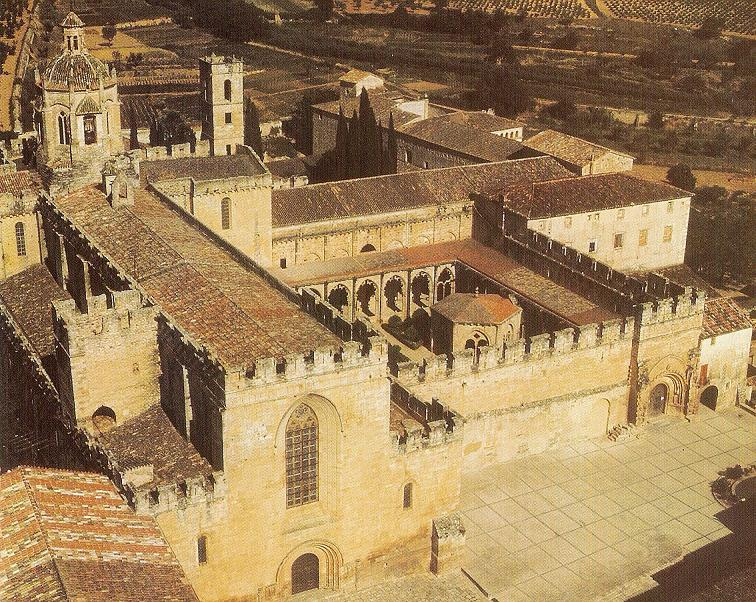
Aerial view.

The monastery's origins date to 1158, when the Lords of Montagut and Albà donated the village of Santes Creus to the monks of Valldaura. The papal decree that was required to establish a monastery was made by Pope Alexander II, and construction of the monastery began in 1174. The complex was completed in 1225.

King Peter III of Aragon chose to be buried in the Monastery of Santes Creus, and so did his son James II (1276–1285) and his wife, Blanche of Anjou. James II had a section of the abbey turned into royal rooms, the original Romanesque cloister rebuilt in the Gothic style of the 13th century, and a dome added to the church's crossing. The walls were built under King Peter IV. From the time of Peter IV, the royal favour was transferred to the Monastery of Poblet.

The monastic complex continued to expand during the 17th and 18th century, until, following the Ecclesiastical Confiscations of Mendizábal in 1835, the Cistercians left and building activities ceased. The monastery was declared a national monument in 1921.

== Description ==
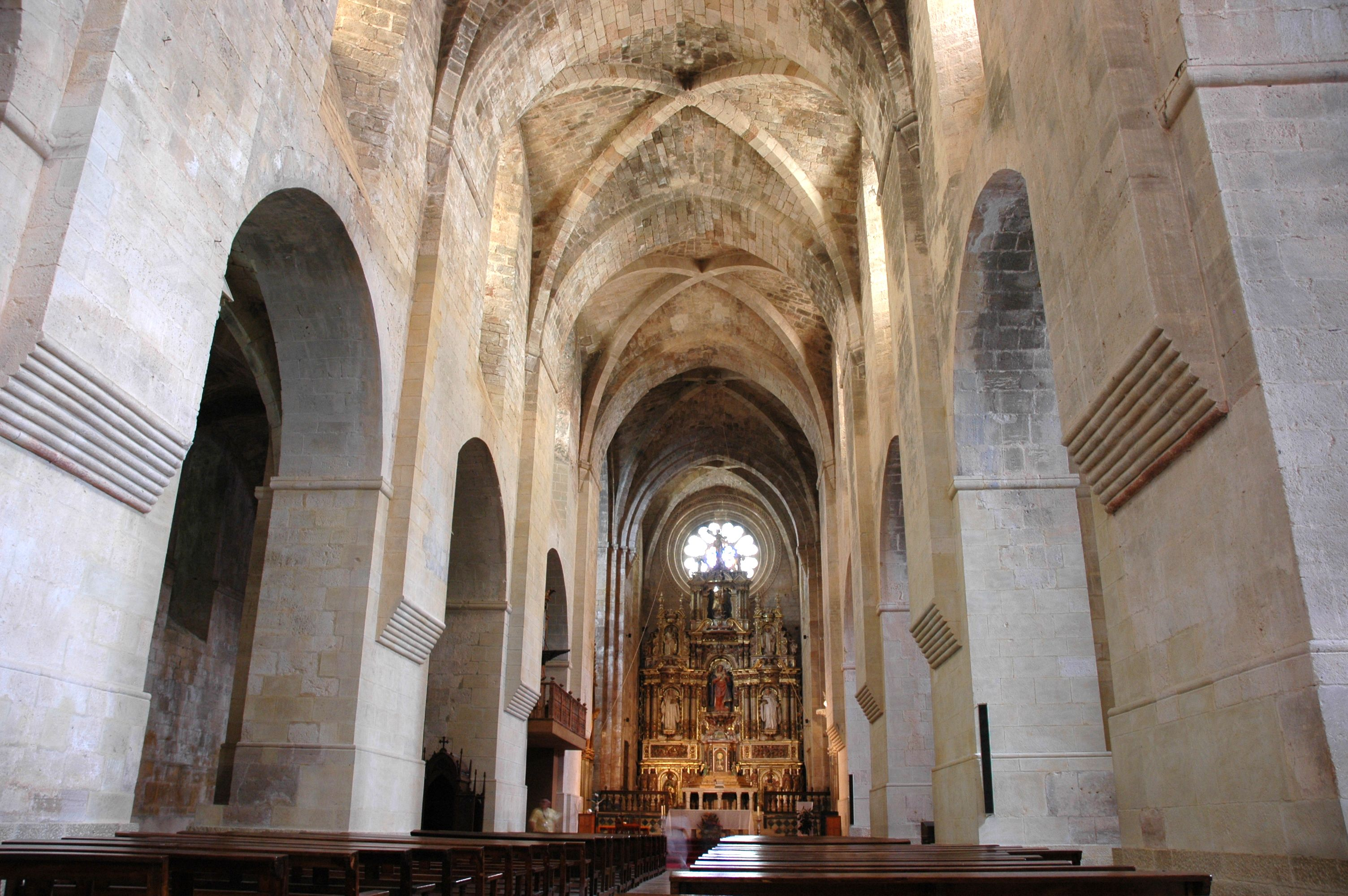
Interior of the church.

The complex, built in accordance with Cistercian principles, included a church, a cloister, chapter house and dormitory. There were also a refectory, parlor, and scriptorium (writing hall). The complex is built in honey coloured stone, and the main buildings, including the church, have rooflines finished with crenellations.

=== Church ===
The church, started in 1174, was finished around 1225. It was consecrated in 1211. It has a Latin cross plan, with a nave and lower aisles of six bays. The arms of the transept, which are the same width as the nave, each end in an apsidal chapel which is barely visible from the exterior. The chancel is rectangular, ending in the presbytery. The crossing is surmounted by a dome raised on a tall octagonal drum in Gothic style, and topped by a Baroque lantern.

The main façade has a Romanesque portal from the 12th century, surmounted by a large Gothic stained glass window. The apse is characterized by a rose window and, below, three small ogival windows, which are now hidden behind the high altar in the interior.

Each bay of the interior has a quadripartite vault, between broad, slightly pointed arches rising from square piers.

As in many other Cistercian churches, the interior has no decoration, aside from the tombs and the altarpiece by Josep Tremulles, dating to 1640.

=== Royal tombs ===
The sepulchre of King Peter III was executed from 1291 to 1307 by Bartomeu de Girona, and looks richer than those of his son (and commissioner of the work), James II, and of the latter's wife, Blanche of Naples. It consists of an urn surrounded by the images of saints, placed over a red porphyry Roman bath brought here by admiral Roger de Lauria.

The mausoleum of James II and his wife Blanche was created by Bertran Riquer in 1313–1315. The tombs are in marble, with portraits of the two monarchs, wearing Cistercian attires, lying on the two slopes of the sepulchre's top.

=== Cloister ===
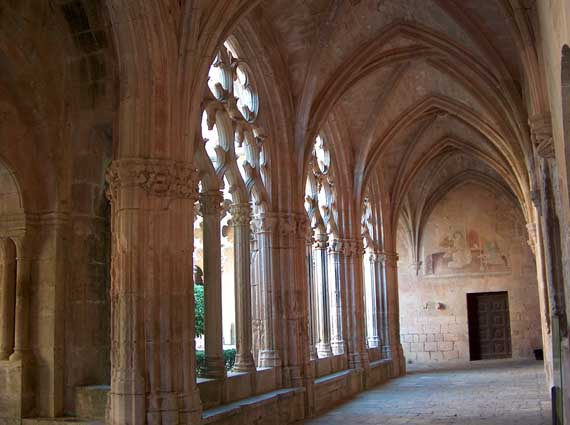
View of the cloister showing tracery in the Spanish style

The original cloister was a Romanesque structure, dating to the late 12th-early 13th century. All that remains of the first cloister is a hexagonal structure, containing the lavabo, or washing place.

By request of King James II, the original cloister was largely demolished and replaced by a Gothic cloister designed by the English mason Reynard of Fonoll, and continued by his disciple Guillem de Seguer. The style of tracery which fills the upper parts of each opening in the cloister arcade varies from English Decorated to Catalan in design. The south side is earlier than the west side, which dates from the 1330s. Some of the English-style reticulated tracery is almost identical to that in the church of Great Walsingham, Norfolk. The clustered columns have highly ornamented capitals with foliate, animal and human figures, as well as biblical scenes. Recesses in the walls house tombs of several Catalan noblemen, and show remains of paintings, one representing the Annunciation.

The cloister can be accessed from the monastery's external square through the Porta de l'Assumpta or Porta Reial ("Royal Gate"), a Romanesque portal.

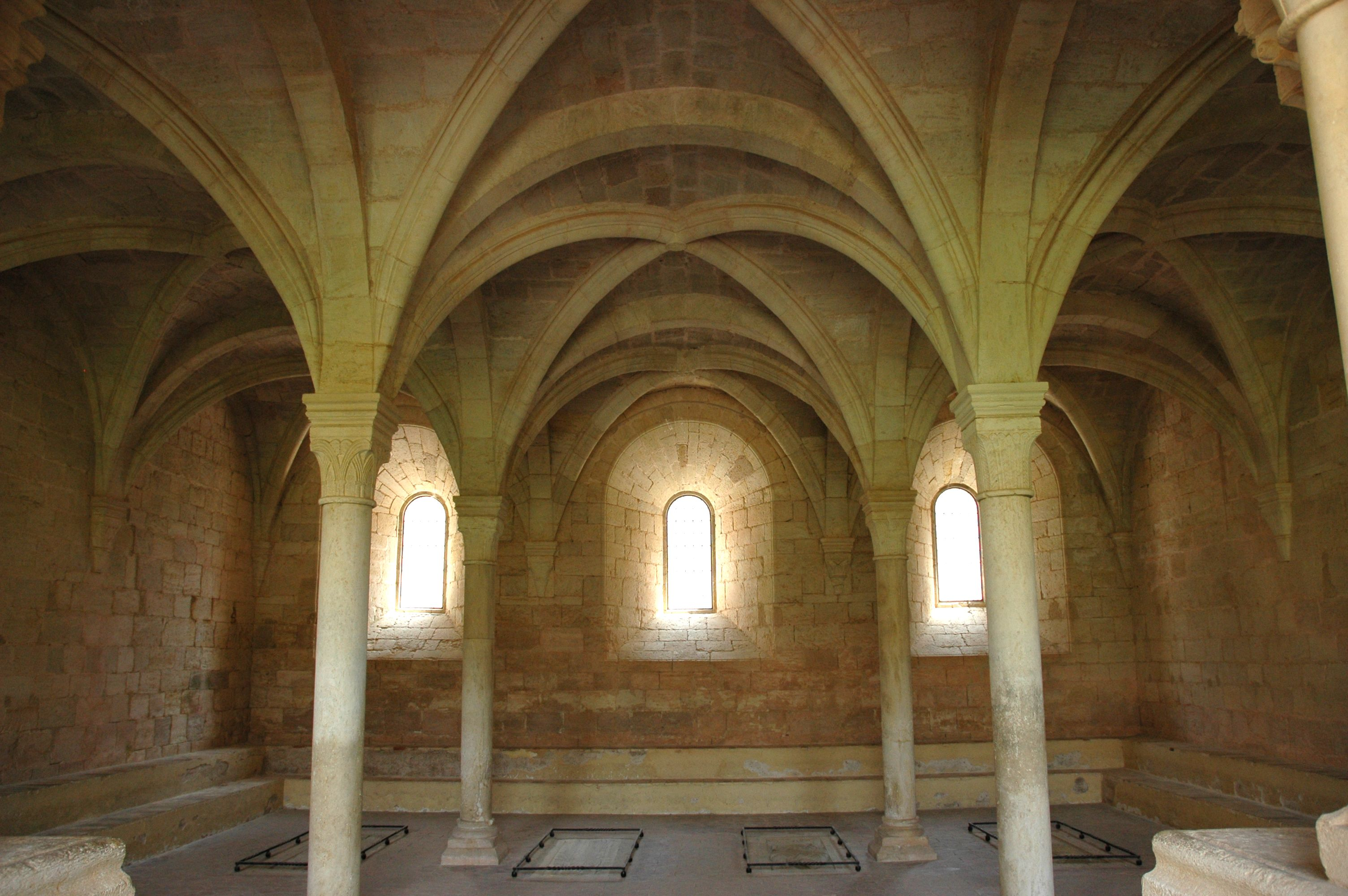
The Chapter House

=== Chapter house and dormitory ===
The chapter house follows the typical design of the Cistercian monasteries, being located in the center of the cloister's eastern wing and separated from the sacristy by the end of the church's transept. The orientation of the room admits the morning light through three windows opening in the eastern wall. The entrance from the cloister is through a Romanesque portal framed on either side by a large mullioned window of equal height, the three openings forming a triple arcade. The hall has a square plan, divided into nine cross vaulted sections by four central columns.

The dormitory is a large (c. 46 x 11 m), undecorated hall without any partitions for the monks, who, initially slept on straw mattresses lying on the floor. The wooden rafters are supported on a series of ogival stone arches that spring from corbels in the side walls.

== Gallery ==
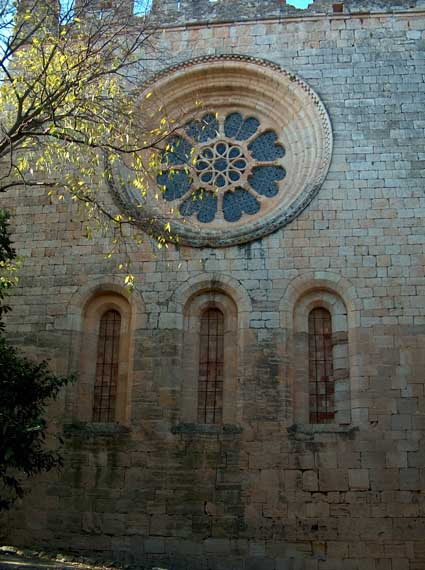
The rose window and lancets of the eastern end

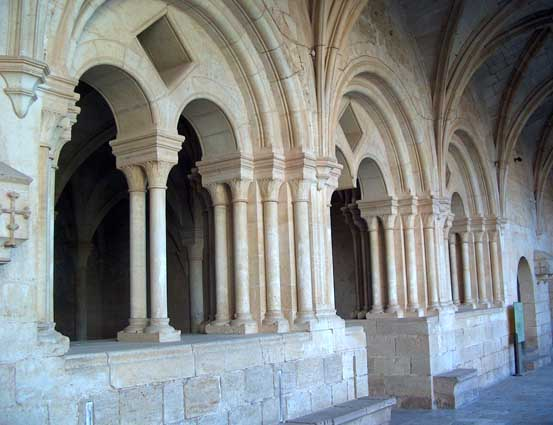
The entrance to the Chapter House

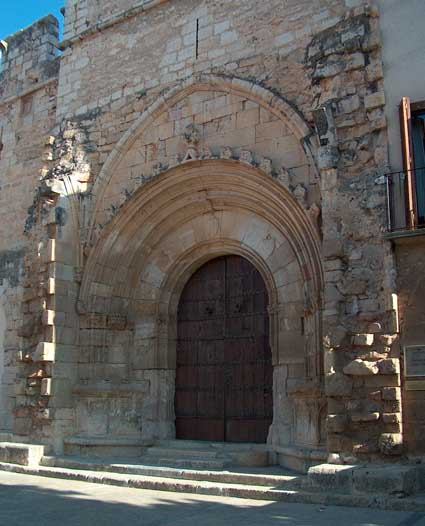
The Royal Portal opens into the cloister. It was once surrounded by a porch.

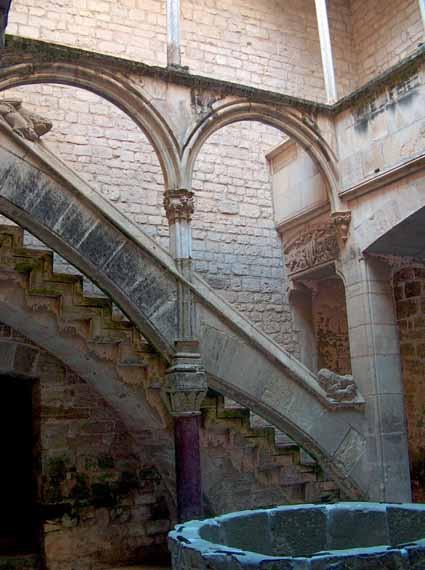
The stairs to the Royal Apartment with a porphyry column

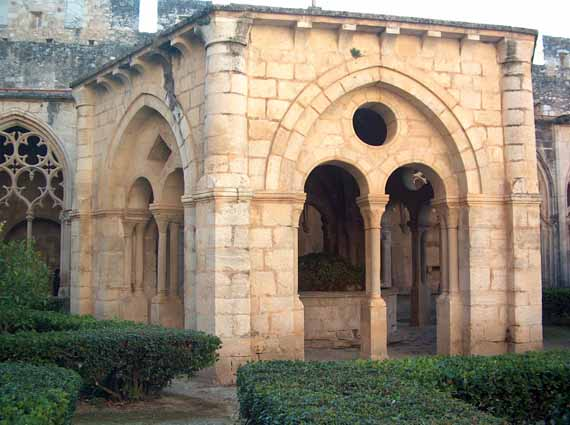
The 12th century lavabo

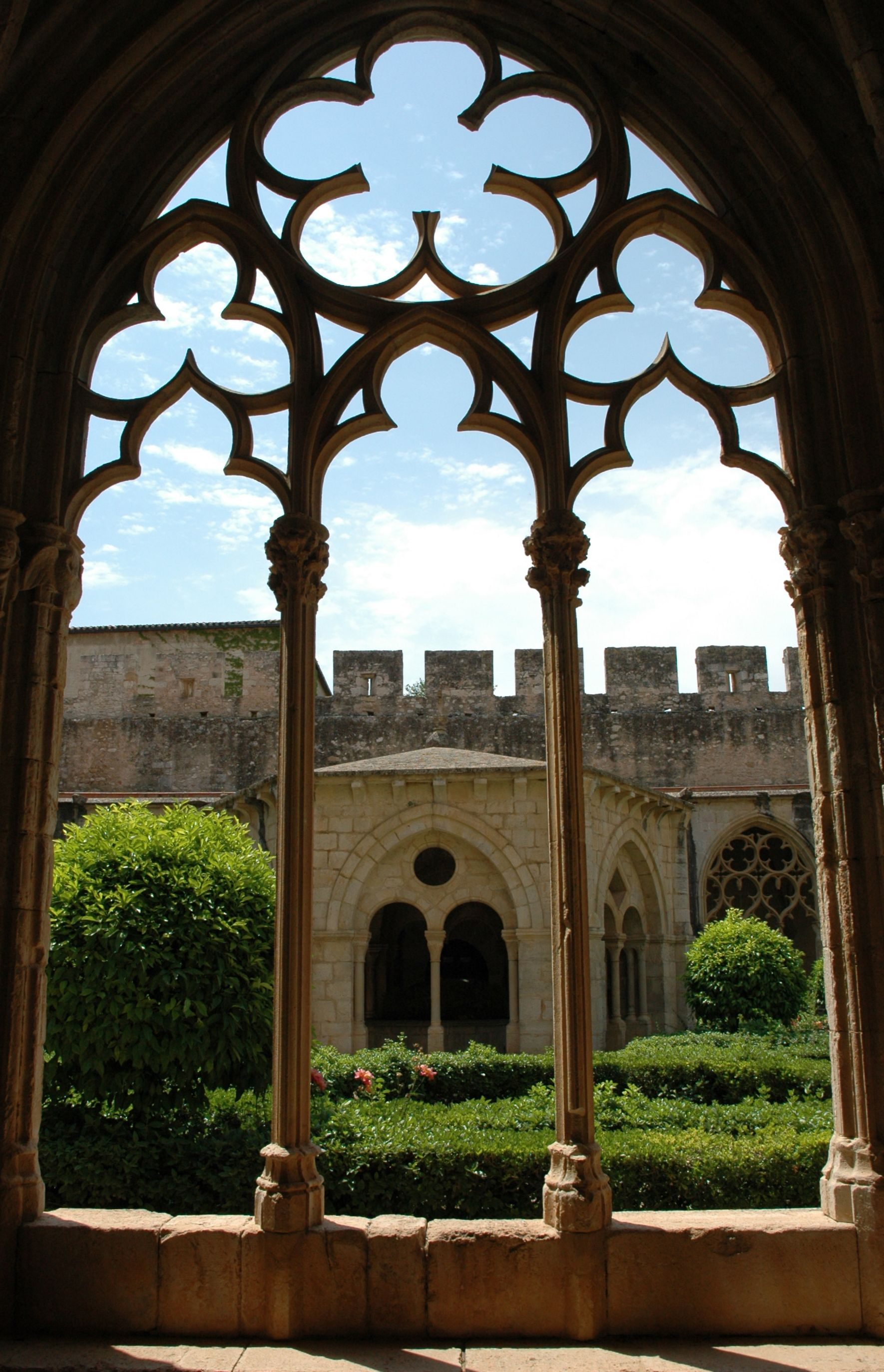
Cloister tracery in the English Gothic tradition

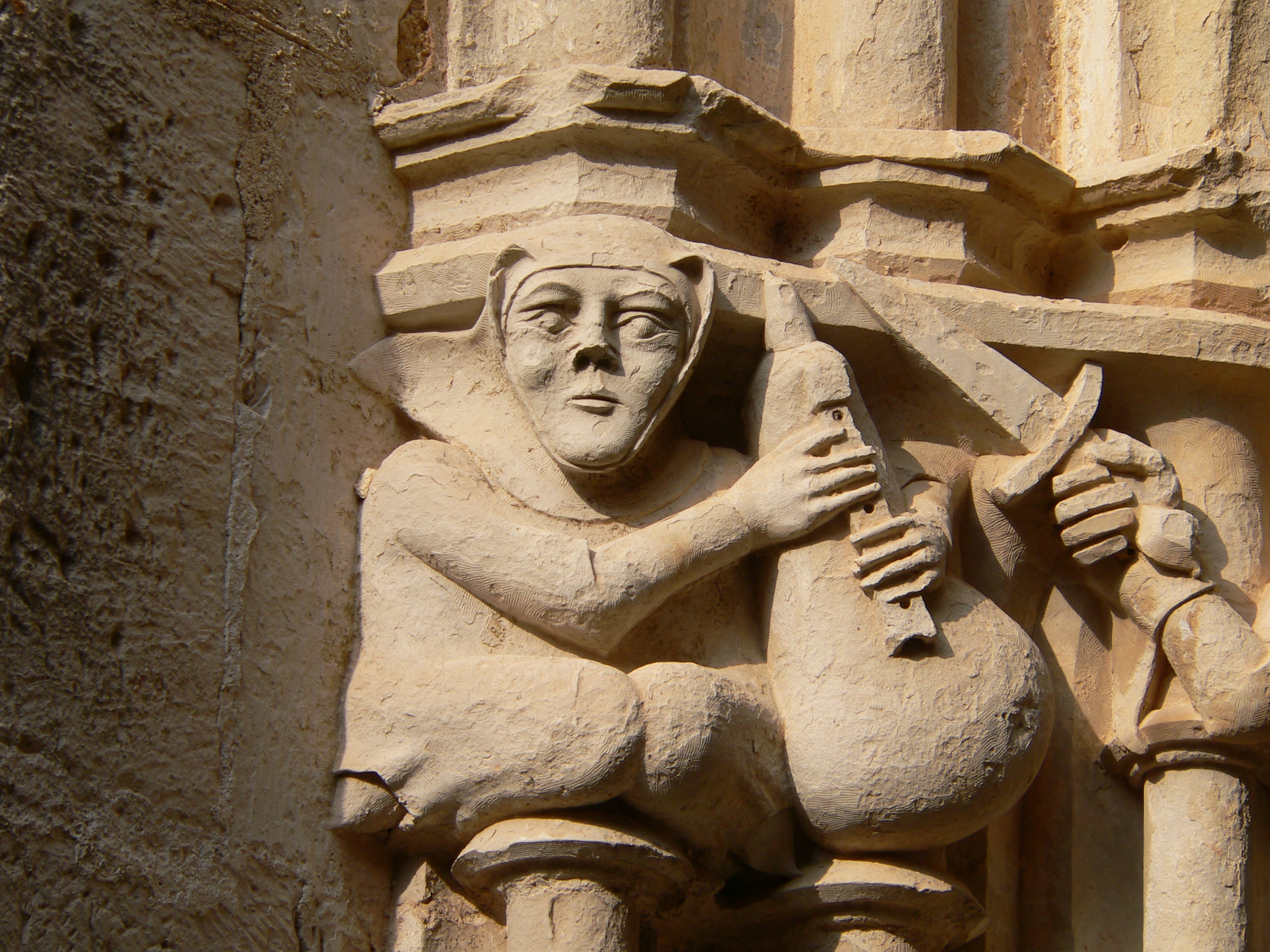
Detail of a figure with bagpipes carved on a capital in the cloister

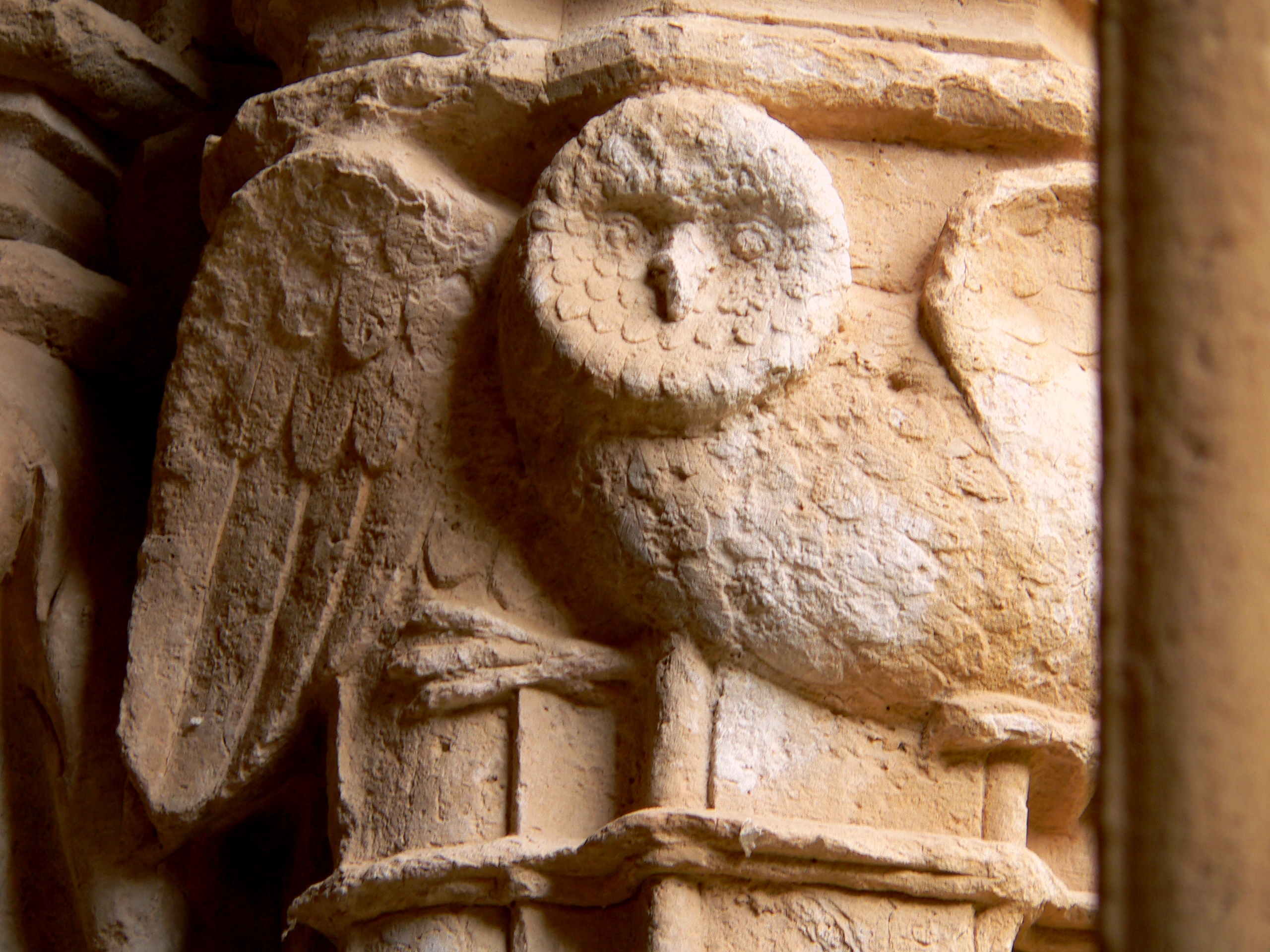
Detail of an owl

== See also ==
- Bonanat de Vilaseca
- Gothic altarpiece of Santes Creus

== Sources ==
- Del Arco, Ricardo (1945). Tombs of the Royal House of Aragon. Madrid: Instituto Jerónimo Zurita. National Research Council.
