= Arnau Bassa =

Spanish painter

Arnau Bassa was a Catalan painter of the 14th century.

He was the son and disciple of painter Ferrer Bassa, with whom he collaborated on numerous works. He introduced the style influences of the pre-Avignonese school, but later he moved to a more Italianized Gothic painting, of which he became one of the main exponents in Catalonia, Spain.

Among his works is an altarpiece for the shoemakers guild of Barcelona (11 December 1346), destined to the city's cathedral, later moved to the Basilica of Santa Maria in Manresa. In 1347, together with his father, he executed the retablo of St. James for the Monastery of Jonqueres, now in the Diocesan Museum of Barcelona. He also took part in the retablo of the Royal Palace of La Almudaina in Palma de Mallorca (now in the National Museum of Ancient Art in Lisbon), which was later finished by the workshop of Ramón Destorrents, after both Arnau and Ferrer had died of plague in 1348.

== Sources ==
- Art de Catalunya, Pintura antiga i medieval. Vol. 8. Barcelona: Educuons L'isard. 1998. ISBN 84-89931-06-2.
