= Jaume Serra (artist) =

Spanish painter

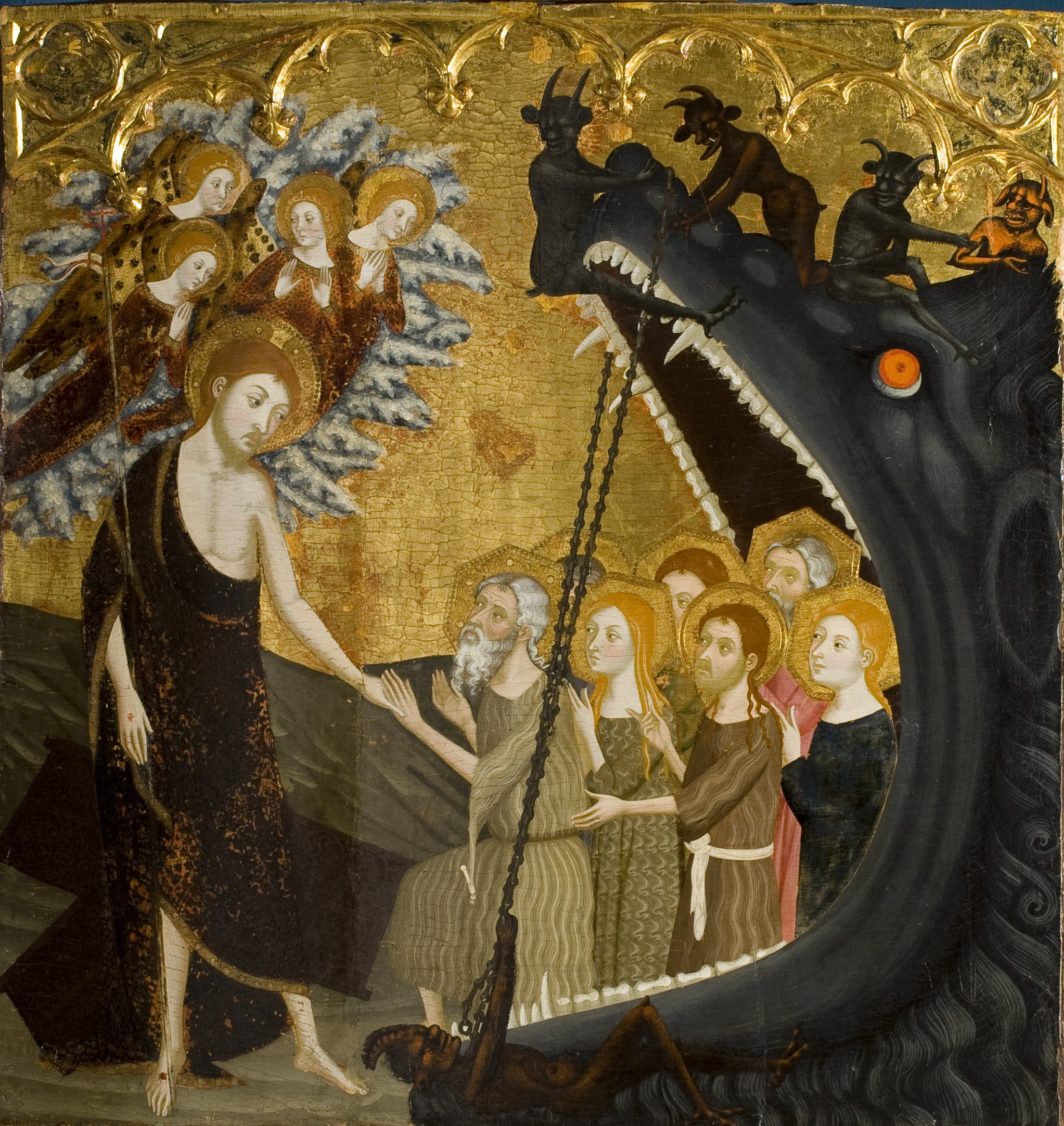
Jaume Serra, The Descent Into Limbo, panel from the altarpiece of The Convent of Santo Sepulchro, Zaragoza

Jaume Serra (died after 1405) was a Catalan painter. Serra was influenced heavily by a Sienese style introduced by Ferrer Bassa.

== Biography ==
Serra was a member of a family of artists active in the Principality of Catalonia in the fourteenth century. His brothers Pere, Francesc and Joan were also painters of italogótico style. The Serra brothers are characterized by the painting of tiny, stylized, slanted eyes and small mouth figures. Jaume painted Madonna of Humility. He also collaborated with his brothers in the realization of the altarpiece of the Monastery of Santa María de Sigena, now in the Museu Nacional d'Art de Catalunya in Barcelona.

Two additional altarpieces are preserved in the Museum of Zaragoza. The Virgin from the Convent of the Holy Sepulchre (Zaragoza) and Martin de Alpartil or the Resurrection (with the portrait of the friar as a donor). The third altarpiece is from the Shrine of Our Lady of Tobed, in Zaragoza, whose execution is documented between 1356 and 1359. It is formed by a central table, the Virgin of Tobed, which are represented the nursing Virgin and Child with the future king of Castile Henry II of Castile as a donor, and its two doors, painted in tempera and altarpieces independent dedicated to Mary Magdalene and John the Baptist, whose stories are told in three successive records on the bench with various saints. The set was kept divided between the Museo del Prado in Madrid, which had since 1965 the two side tables, and Várez Fisa collection, until in 2013 the collection has been donated to the Madrid museum main table, so that the altar could be made whole again. Jaume's altarpiece The Holy Spirit can be found in the Manresa cathedral.
