= Joan Daurer =

Spanish painter

Joan Daurer was a Catalan art painter and worked in Mallorca between 1358 and 1374. Daurer is recorded in historical records as a 14th-century church painter on the Spanish Balearic island of Mallorca. His works show the influence of his mentor Ramón Destorrents (1345–1362) from Barcelona.

Joan Daurer's Gothic painting reached Mallorca a goodly number of works of art, many of which are altarpieces. Some of these works of art are scattered in the monasteries, churches and parish or local museums, while other parts are kept in the Museum of Mallorca.

An important work is considered to be the pictorial panel of Santa Maria de Inca (Saint Mary of Inca) from 1373 in the parish church Santa Maria la Major of Inca.

== Works ==
- Chapel decoration, Sant Miquel Arcangel (1374), Muro
- Other works of art by Joan Daurer, but which cannot be assigned in time:
  - Panel painting, Coronació de la Mare de Déu, Inca (now located in the Museum of the Diocese of Palma).
  - Altarpiece La Passió de Crist
  - Painting in the town hall of Santa Maria del Camí.
  - Altarpiece of Saint Mary Magdalene in the monastery of Santa Magdalena.

== Honors ==
In 2021, a street (Carrer de Joan Daurer) in Palma de Mallorca was named after Daurer.

== Literature ==
- Hans-Jürgen Fründt (2005). Mallorca: mit großer Inselkarte. Baedeker. ISBN 978-3-8297-1061-9.
