= Ramón Destorrents =

Spanish painter

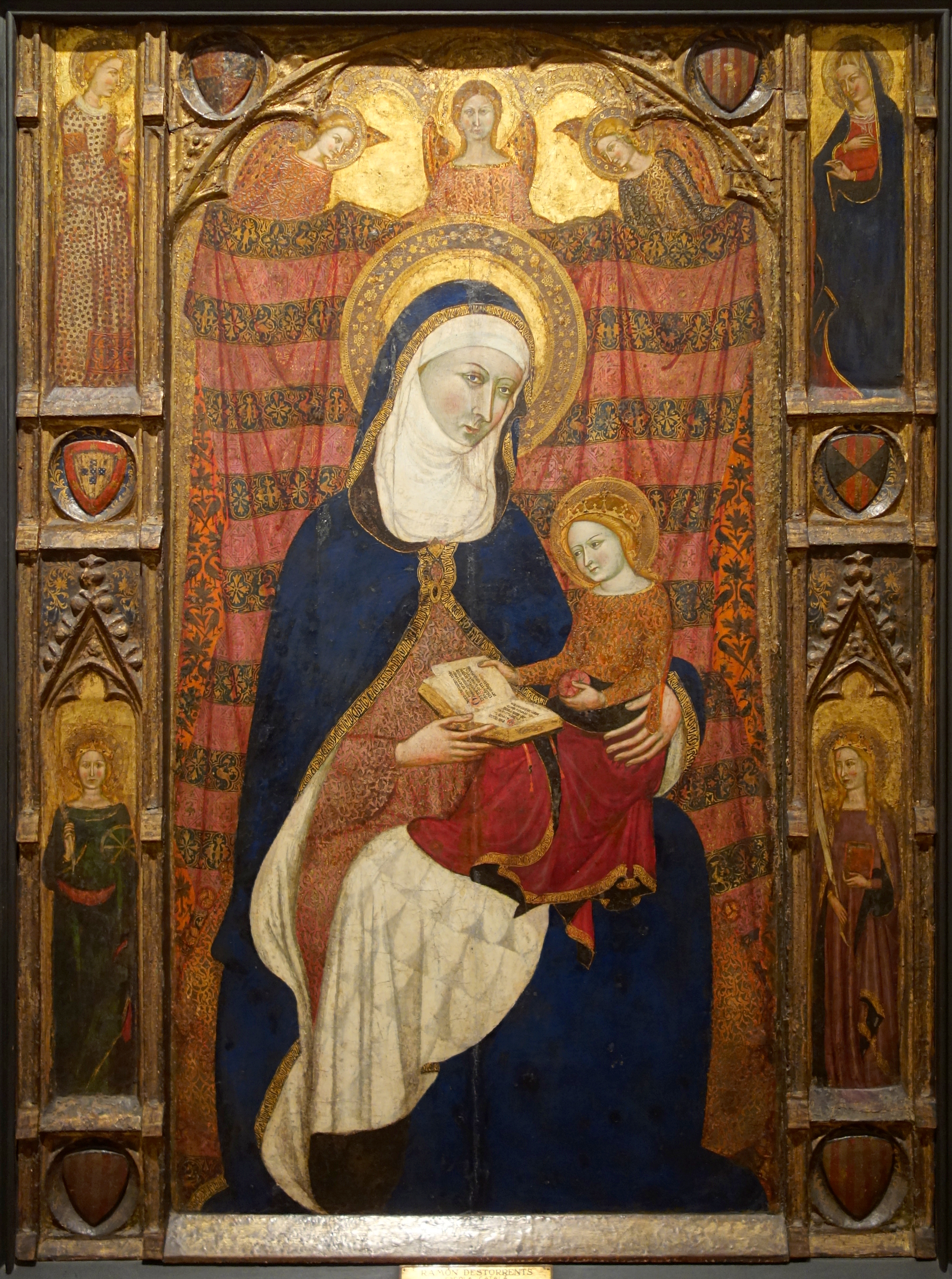
Altarpiece of Saint Anne and the Mother of God, tempera on panel, 156 x 112 cm, Museu Nacional de Arte Antiga, Lisbon. Commissioned by Pedro IV Ceremonious to Ferrer Bassa, who could have started, it was completed by Destorrents.

Ramón Destorrents was a Catalan mid-14th century painter and miniaturist. He was influenced by the Sienese Gothic painting.

Numerous works, once assigned to other painters or anonymous, have been recently attributed to Destorrents, such a polyptych in the church of Santa Maria de Manresa. In 1351, at the death of Ferrer Bassa, he was named court miniaturist of Peter IV of Aragon. Pere Serra was a member of Destorrents' workshop.

His other works include a triptych in the church of Santa Maria of Iravalls (1360), showing the influence of Simone Martini, and retablos for the royal palace in Valencia and Palma de Mallorca (chapel of the Royal Palace of La Almudaina), and for the Monastery of Santa María de Sigena.
