= Bernat Martorell =

Catalan painter (died 1452)

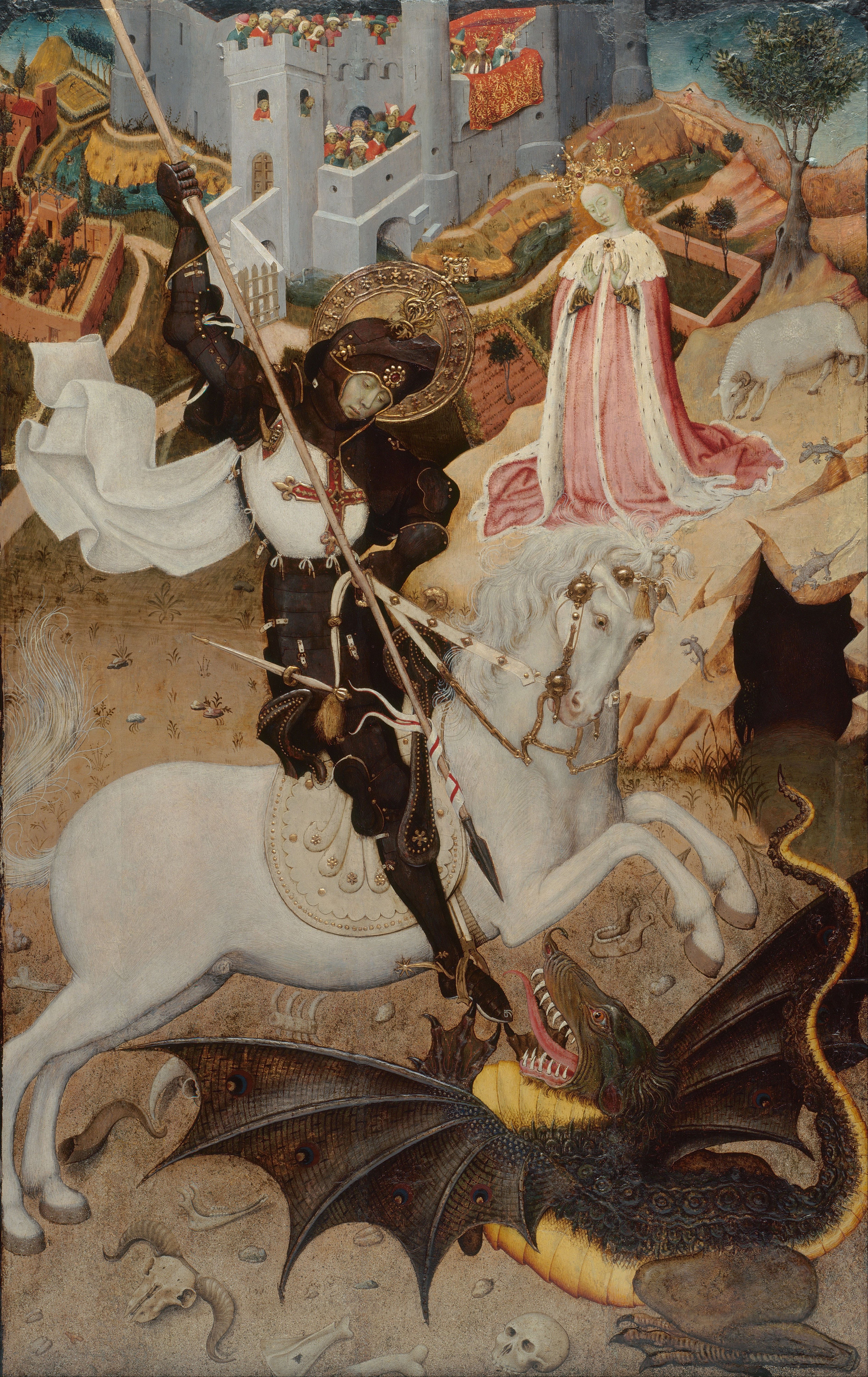
Saint George and the Dragon, 1434–1435 (Art Institute of Chicago).

Bernat Martorell (died 1452 in Barcelona) was the leading painter of Barcelona, Catalonia. He is considered to be the most important artist of the International Gothic style in Catalonia. Martorell painted retable panels and manuscript illuminations, and carved sculptures and also provided designs for embroideries.

== Biography ==
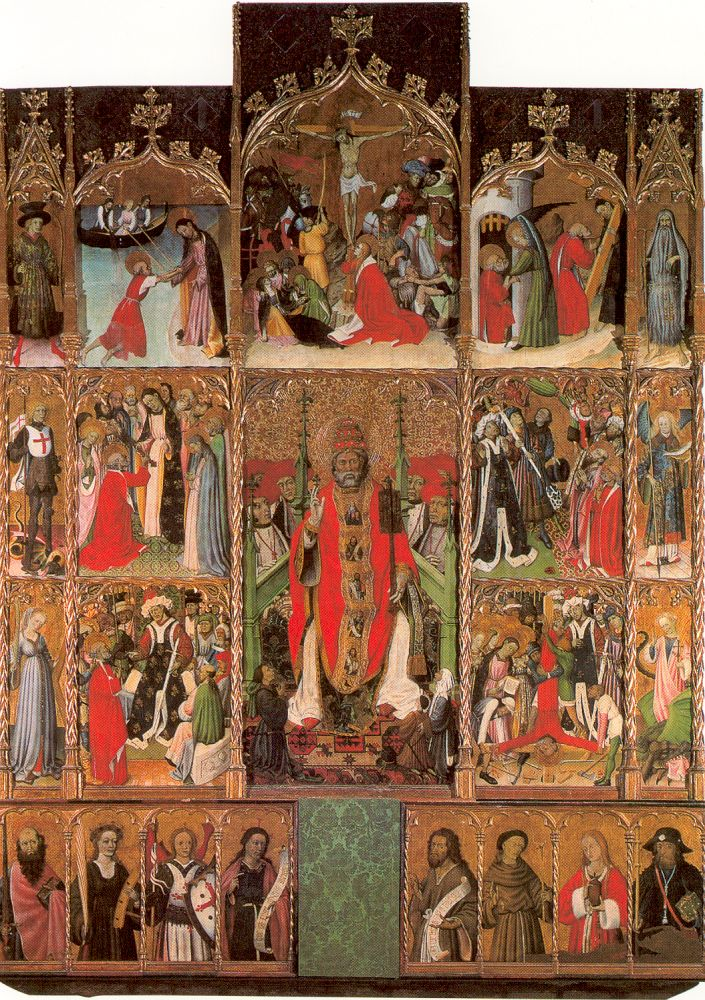
Retable of Saint Pere de Púbol, end of the 1430s (Museu d'Art de Girona)

Little is known of his life prior to 1427, though by the mid-15th century he was one of the leading artists in Catalonia. The style of Martorell is contrastingly different from the Catalan Gothic painters who preceded him chronologically, including Lluís Borrassà. It shows that Martorell was familiar with contemporary Flemish painting, however, the documented part of his biography does not explain this influence. On the other hand, stylistic parallels have been drawn between Martorell and contemporary Italian artists, including Pisanello, Sassetta, and Gentile da Fabriano, but without any documentary evidence.

Sometimes the Retable of Saint John the Baptist from Cabrera de Mar (Museu Diocesà de Barcelona) is attributed to Martorell. If he indeed painted the retable, this could explain the gap between Martorell and the International Gothic in Catalunya. There is, however, no documented evidence that Martorell painted the retable, and his authorship has been disputed.

One of the earliest surviving works of Martorell, Saint George and the Dragon (tempera on panel, Art Institute of Chicago), depicting Bernat Martorell's patron saint, was created in the early 1430s and already demonstrates the complexity of composition, richness of colors and fine details which could only have been executed by a fully trained artist. These details were not present in Catalan art before Martorell.

About the same time, Martorell also executed illustrations to the Ferial Psalter and the Book of Hours, and painted the Predella of the Passion of Christ (Museu de la Catedral de Barcelona). Two altarpieces, Retable of Saint Vincent (which survived entirely) and Retable of Saint Lucy (the top of the central section was probably executed by another painter) were apparently painted in the 1430s.

In 1437, Bernat Martorell got a commission to create an altarpiece (Retable of Saint Pere de Púbol) for the church in Púbol. The altarpiece devoted to Saint Peter, is currently in Museu d'Art de Girona and is the only directly documented piece produced by the artist. The retable was completed in the beginning of the 1440s. Very similar style is found in the Retable of Saint John, which was kept in the parish church of Vinaixa, as well as in the Retable of Saint Michael from La Pobla de Cérvoles. This style shows more attention to detail than earlier works by Martorell.

Between 1445 and 1452, Bernat Martorell produced the Retable of the Transfiguration from the Barcelona Cathedral and the Main Retable of Santa Maria del Mar in the cathedral of Santa Maria del Mar.

It is also presumed that Martorell provided a model according to which the embroiderer Antonio Sadurní executed the altar frontal of Saint George, between 1450 and 1451, conserved in the Palau de la Generalitat de Catalunya's Capella de Sant Jordi.

== Anthology of works ==
- The Beheading of Saint John the Baptist and Salome Presenting His Head to Herod
- The Nativity
- Altarpiece of the Saints John, at MNAC Barcelona
- Saint George and the Dragon, at the Art Institute of Chicago
- Enthroned Virgin and Child with Personifications of the Virtues of Temperance, Fortitude, Justice, and Prudence, at the Philadelphia Museum of Art

== Gallery ==
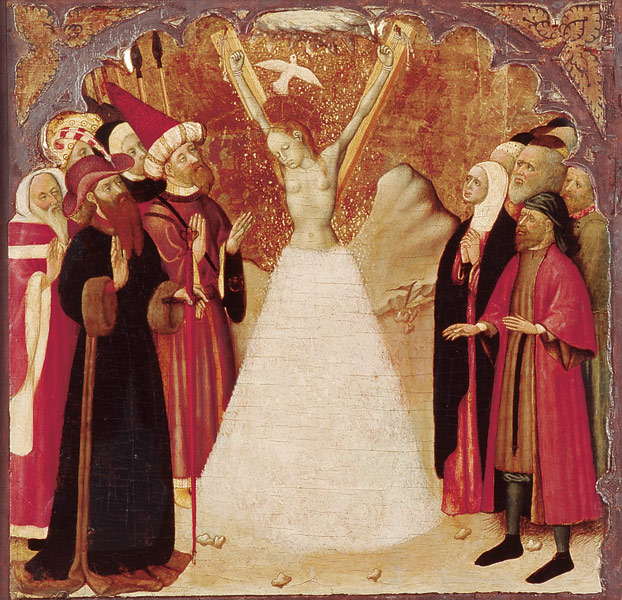
Crucifixion of Santa Eulalia, 1427–1437 (Vic, Episcopal Museum of Vic)

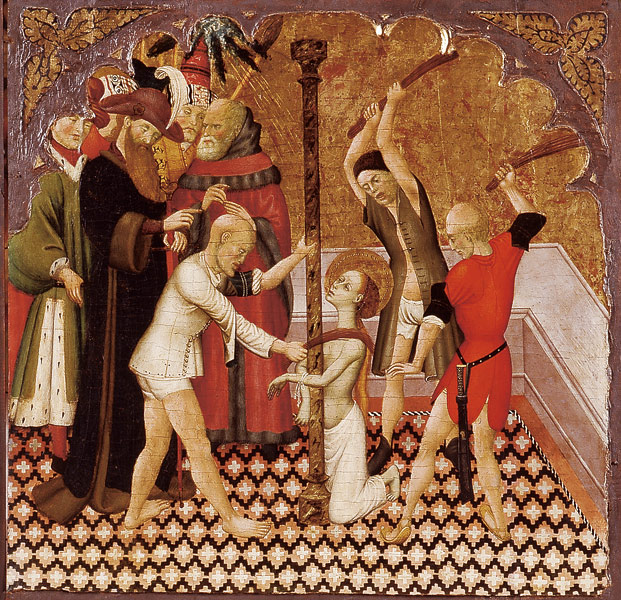
Flagellation of Santa Eulalia, 1427–1437 (Vic, Episcopal Museum of Vic)

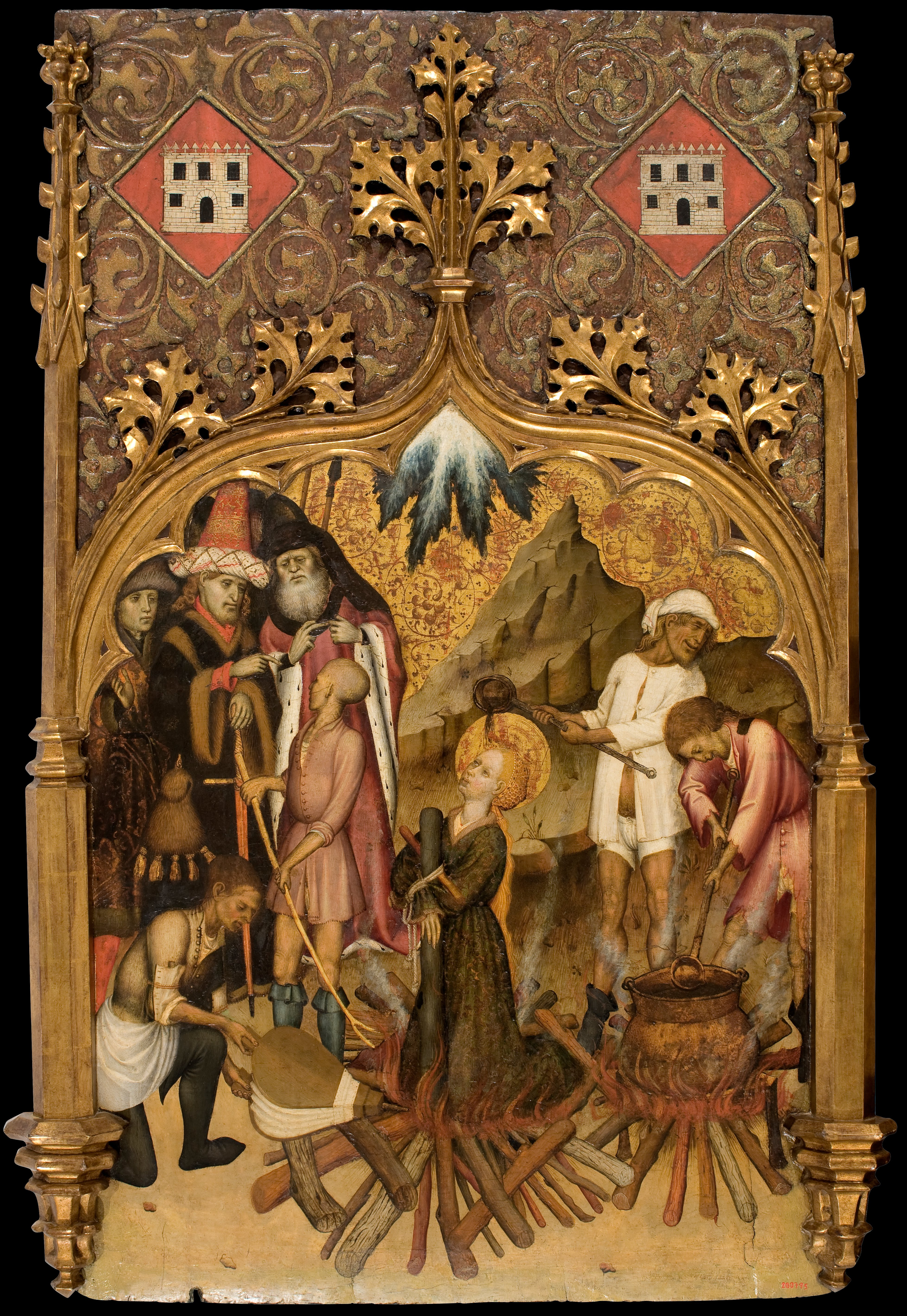
Martyrdom of Saint Lucy, circa 1435–1440 (Museu Nacional d'Art de Catalunya)

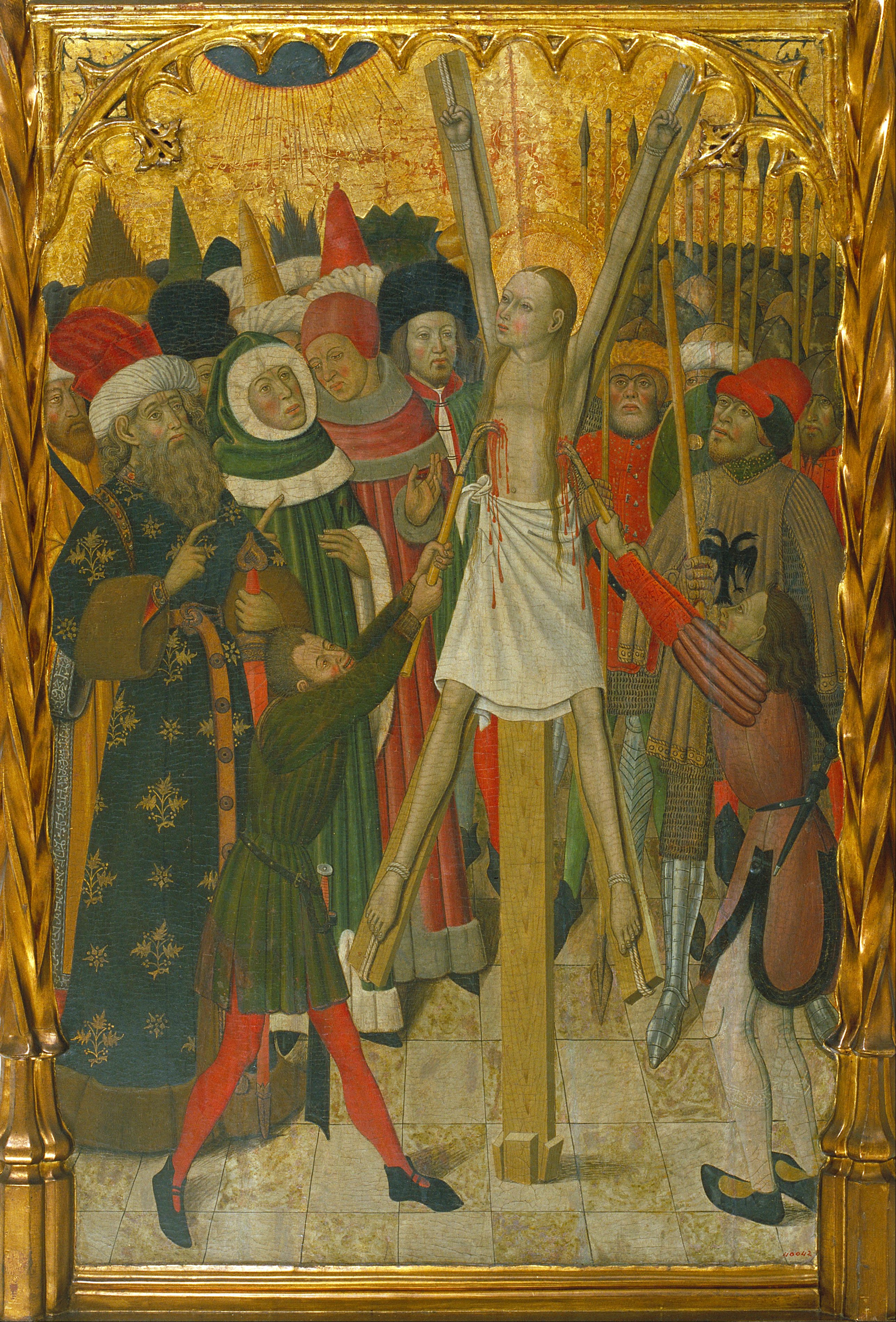
Martyrdom of Saint Eulalia, between circa 1442 and circa 1445 (Museu Nacional d'Art de Catalunya)

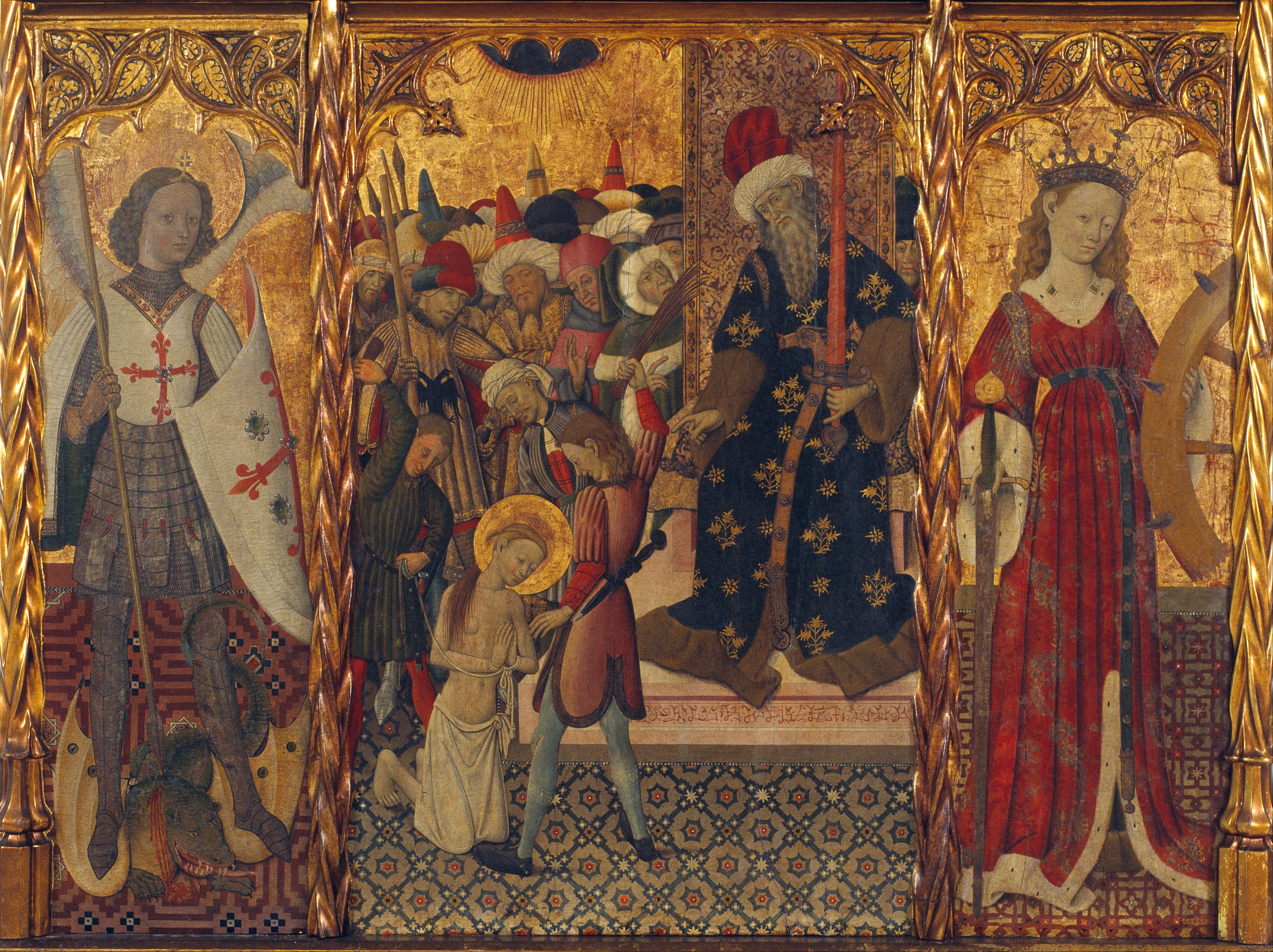
Saint Michael, Martyrdom of Saint Eulalia and Saint Catherine, between circa 1442 and circa 1445 (Museu Nacional d'Art de Catalunya)
