= Virgin of the Angels =

Painting by Pere Serra

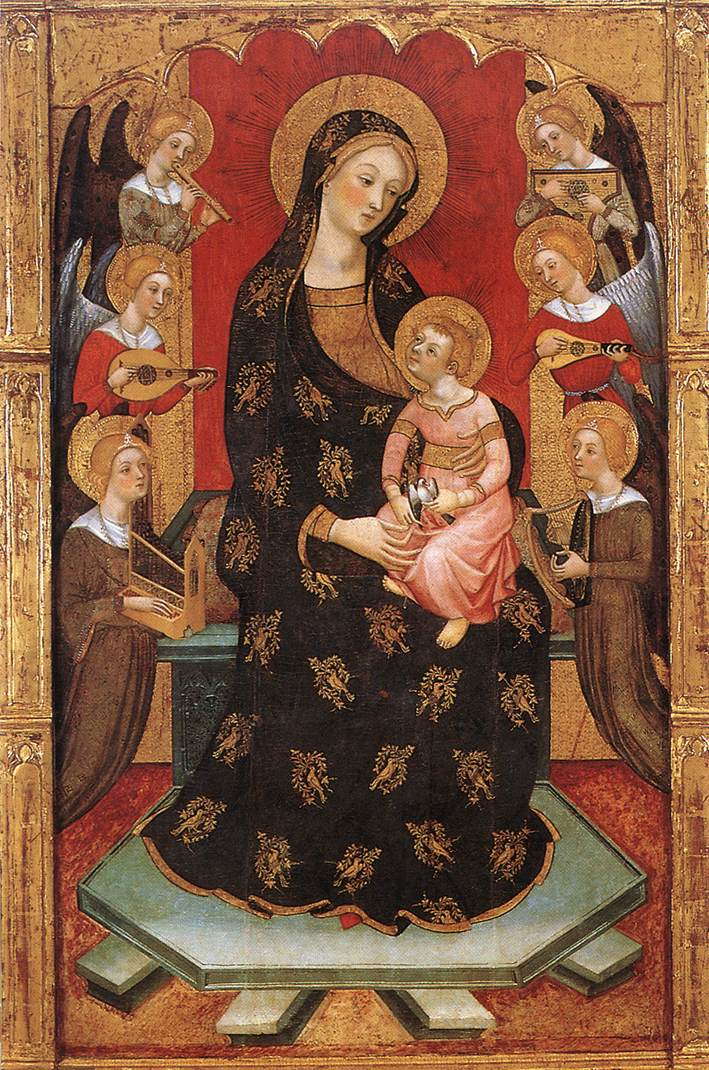
- Artist: Pere Serra
- Year: c. 1385
- Type: Tempera and gold leaf on wood
- Dimensions: 195.8 cm × 131 cm × 11 cm (77.1 in × 52 in × 4.3 in)
- Location: Museu Nacional d'Art de Catalunya, Barcelona

The Virgin of the Angels is a painting by Pere Serra conserved at the National Art Museum of Catalonia.

== Description ==
This central panel and the two sections of the predella with saints (which must once have flanked a tabernacle) are all that remains of an altarpiece. It was dedicated to the Virgin Mary and was painted for one of the chapels in the ambulatory of Tortosa cathedral, probably towards the 1380s. The compartment with the Virgin and Child surrounded by angels playing music is a very graceful and refined version of an iconographic type that was extremely popular at the time. Pere Serra, author of the altarpiece, came from a family of painters who grew to head the Catalan painting of the second half of the fourteenth century.
