= Saint George and the Dragon (Martorell) =

Painting by Bernat Martorell

- Saint George Killing the Dragon
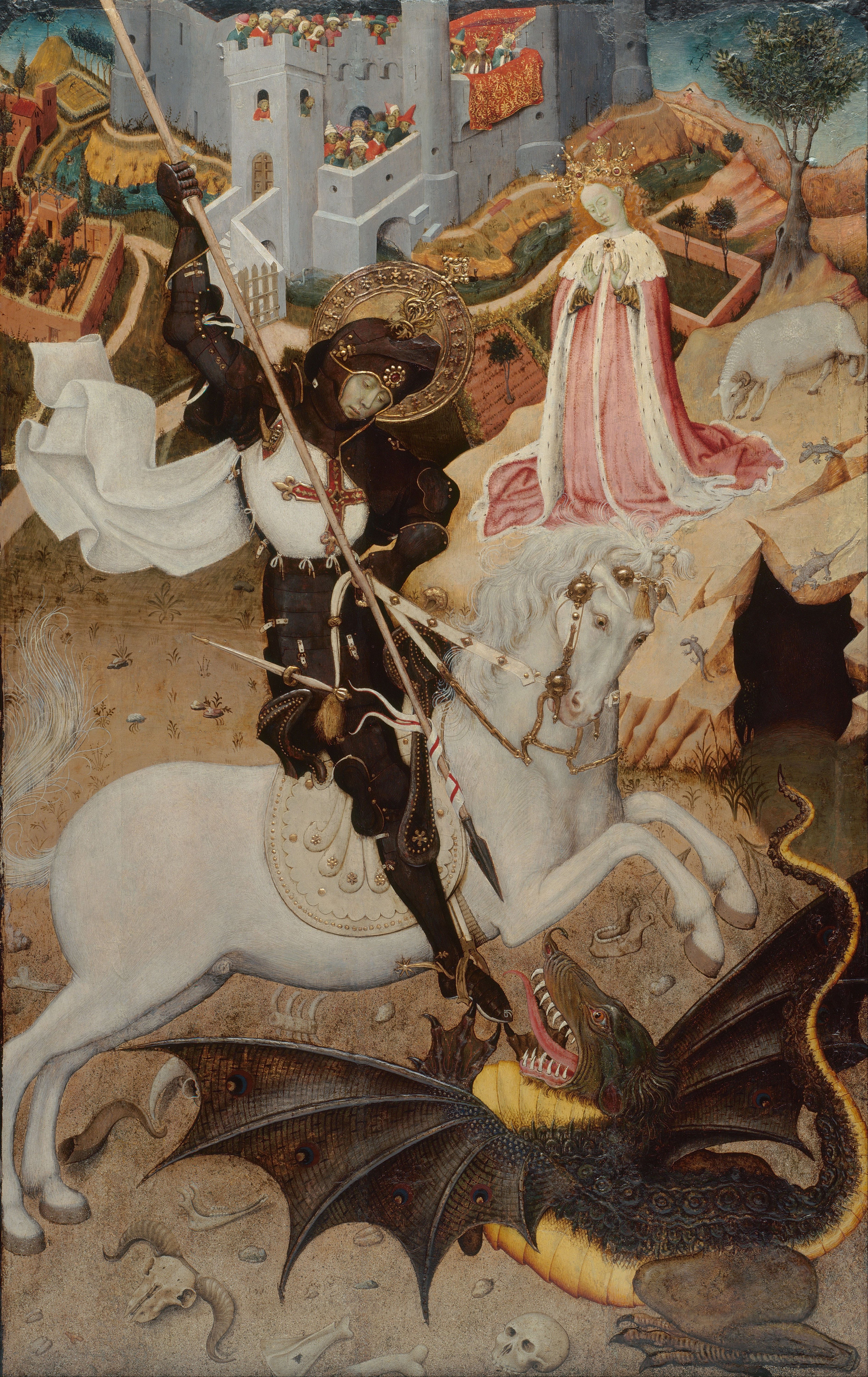
- Artist: Bernat Martorell
- Year: c. 1434 – c. 1435
- Medium: Tempera on panel
- Movement: International Gothic
- Dimensions: 155.6 cm × 98.1 cm (61.25 in × 38.625 in)
- Location: Art Institute of Chicago, Chicago
- Owner: Art Institute of Chicago
- Accession: 1933.786

Saint George and the Dragon, also known as Saint George Killing the Dragon, is a tempera painting by the Catalan artist Bernat Martorell, painted c. 1434 – c. 1435. It depicts the famous legend of Saint George and the Dragon, in which the Christian knight Saint George rescues a princess from a dragon.

== History ==
The painting is likely to have been commissioned by the Catalan government as an altarpiece for the Chapel of Saint George, in the Government Palace of Catalonia in Barcelona. The four side-panels that would probably have also been fixed to the altar depict the martyrdom of Saint George, and are in the collection of the Louvre in Paris. The painting was most probably painted some time between 1434 and 1435.

Starting in 1867, the painting changed hands numerous times until it was eventually sold to Charles Deering in 1917. In 1921, the painting was loaned to the Art Institute of Chicago by Deering. Then, in 1924, the painting went to Deering's daughters, Marion Deering-McCormick and Barbara Deering-Danielson, who donated the work to the Art Institute of Chicago in 1933.

== Description ==
The work, painted in International Gothic style, depicts Saint George's legend in the setting of Catalonia during the first half of the 15th century. The painting was initially made as the centerpiece of an altar, and was surrounded by four smaller, narrative panels.

The scene in the foreground shows Saint George on a stark white horse, about to defeat the dragon by stabbing it with his lance. Saint George is depicted in black armor with a halo above his head. The saint's expression appears calm and stoic in contrast to the dragon's, which seems angry and excited. The dragon has dark-green scales, is winged, and has red eyes. The dragon's scales, and the armor and halo on Saint George are decorated with raised stucco. The ground is shown to be littered with lizards, skulls, and other bones. In the immediate background, the princess stands praying behind them; she is dressed in a pink robe lined with ermine fur, with a large golden crown above her red-golden hair. In the distance, on the other side of a valley, the princess's parents and common people can be seen to be watching apprehensively from atop a castle. The castle is surrounded by a serene and intricate countryside.

In the style typical of International Gothic works, the ground rises steeply behind the scene but, unusually, it does not stretch behind the entire painting. Rather, there is a clear separation between the foreground and the background. While the background maintains the decorative nature and continuity of color typical of International Gothic backgrounds, the foreground is more expressive, and contains gradations of color and lighting.

The main axis of the composition can be placed by the shaft of Saint George's lance and an imaginary vertical line drawn through the eyes of the dragon, the horse, and the princess. The two lines create a "V" shape that outlines the castle in the background.
