= Altarpiece of the Saints John =

Polyptych by Bernat Martorell

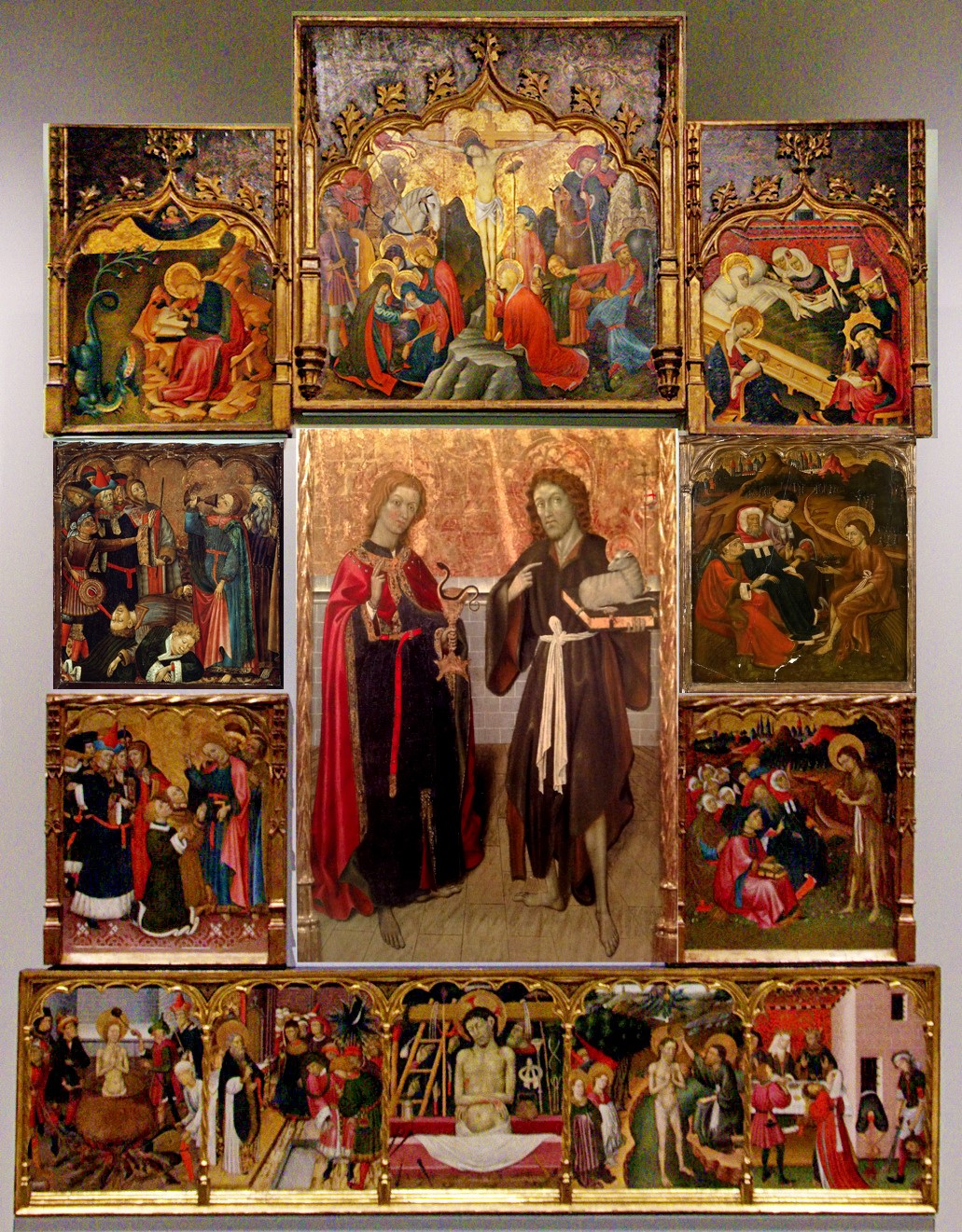
- Artist: Bernat Martorell
- Year: 1430s (Julian)
- Medium: tempera
- Dimensions: 344 cm (135 in) × 261.5 cm (103.0 in) × 10.5 cm (4.1 in)

The Altarpiece of the Saints John is a painting by Bernat Martorell conserved at the National Art Museum of Catalonia.

== Description ==
The Altarpiece of the Saints John from Vinaixa was commissioned in 1432 from the Tarragona painter Ramon de Mur, but in the end it was painted by Martorell. The MNAC keeps most of the panels from this altarpiece. The main panel is kept at the Museu Diocesà de Tarragona, a side compartment is kept at the Musée Rolin d'Autun (France), and the whereabouts of another compartment is unknown. The two Saints John feature in the scenes in the lateral lanes of the altarpiece and two more on the predella, respectively. The topmost compartment depicts the Calvary. The predella shows signs of old damage, especially scratches, on figures who were considered negative, such as the executioner (who cuts Saint John's head off), Herod and Herodias (crowned, behind the panel) and the Jews.
