= Bonanat de Vilaseca =

Abbot Bonanat de Vilaseca was one of the more important abbots in Santes Creus monastery (Catalonia).

In this period, the monastery was a center of intellectual and political activity and was comparable to the Poblet Monastery.

Abbot Bonanat de Vilaseca founded also the subsidiaries of Santa Maria de Valldigna in 1298 and the Monastery of Altofonte (Sicily) in 1308, when Jaume II el Just was reigning.

== Sources ==
- "Un gran Vila-secà del s.XIII: Fra Bonanat, abat de Santes Creus" - FORT I COGUL, E. - Santes Creus, 1975. Publicacions de l’Arxiu Bibliogràfic.
