= Santa Maria, Manresa =

Church in Manresa, Spain

Coordinates: 41°43′18.83″N 1°49′37.52″E

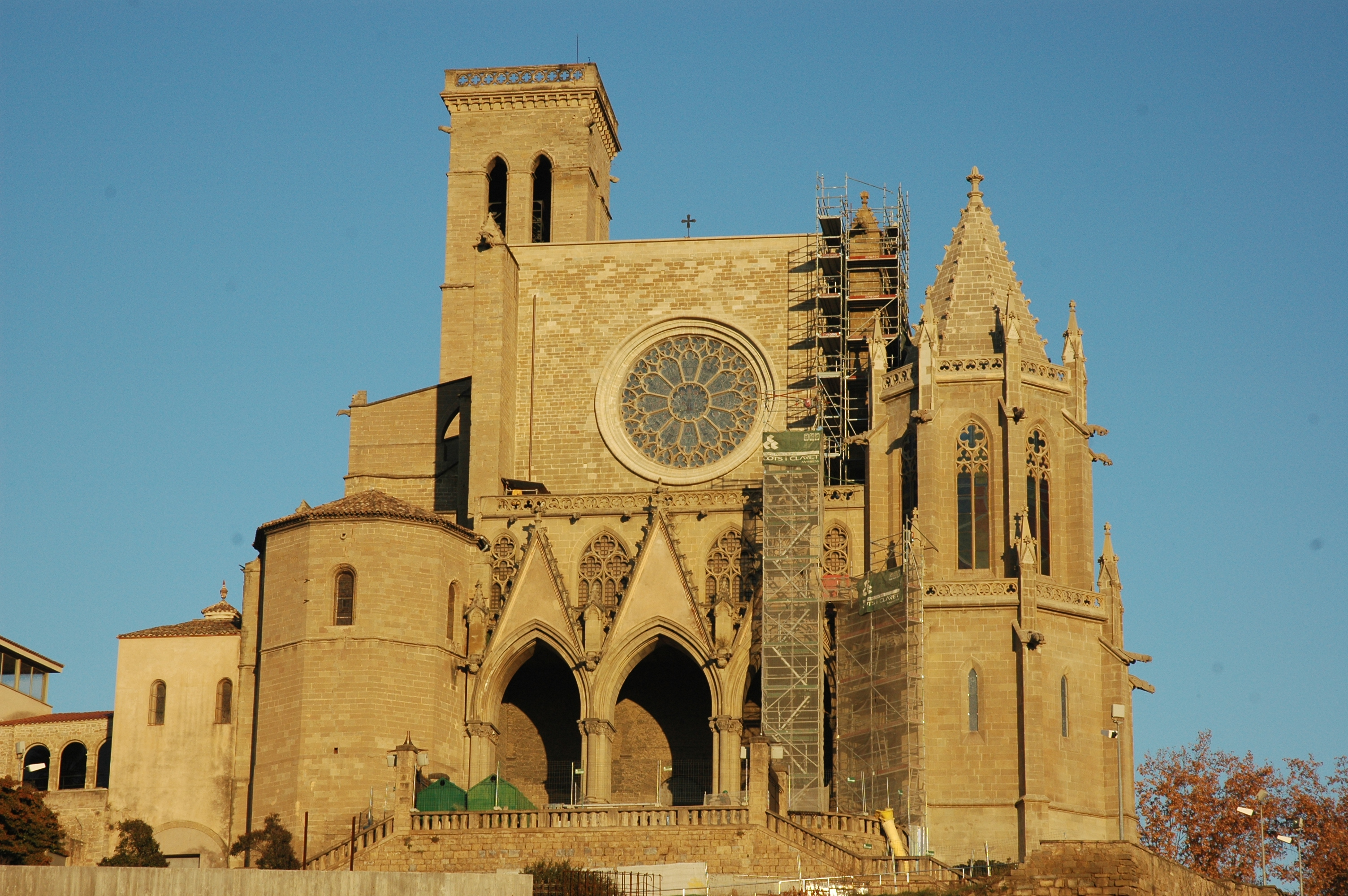
Basilica of Santa Maria.

The Collegiate Basilica of Santa Maria (Catalan: Santa Maria de Manresa; Spanish: Santa María de Manresa), also known as La Seu, is a Romanesque-Gothic church in Manresa, Catalonia, north of Spain.

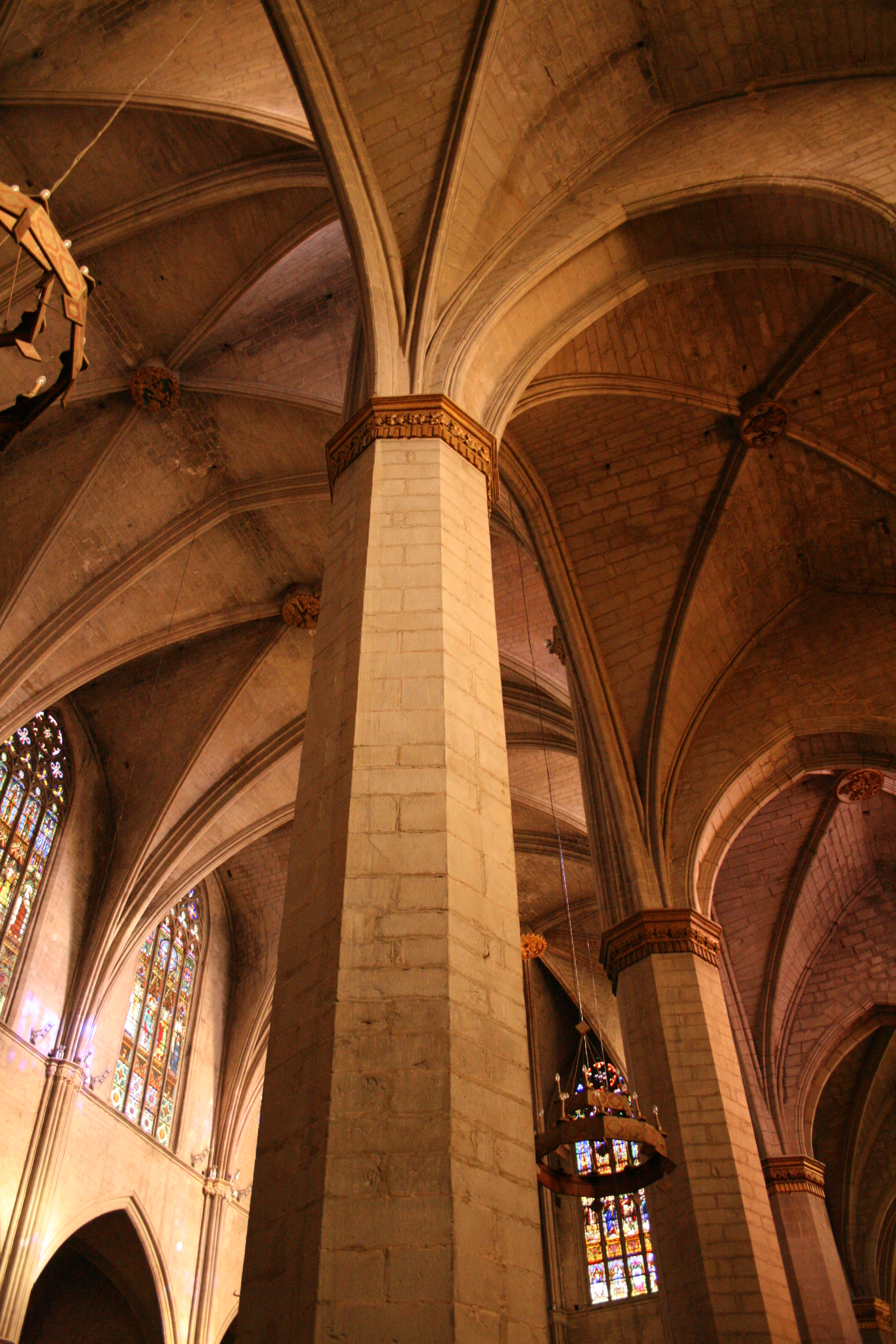
Gothic vaults in the interior.

== History ==
The church of Santa Maria is documented from the year 890. In 999 the edifice was devastated by troops of Al-Mansur, along with the whole city. In 1000 count Ramon Berenguer I of Barcelona, together with his mother Ermesinde and later with Oliba, bishop of Vic, decided to refurbish the church.

Today only scanty remains are preserved of this Romanesque structure, and of its pre-Romanesque forerunner, including columns in the gallery (11th century), featuring columns with capitals having vegetable and geometrical motifs, and a 12th-century portal. During the 14th century, Manresa underwent a large expansion, and a new Gothic structure was thus added above the pre-existing church. Construction started in 1322, under design by architect Berenguer de Montagut, who had been previously working at Santa Maria del Mar in Barcelona. The first stone was placed in 1328 but works dragged on into the 15th century and later.

The crypt was built in 1578, followed by the Chapel of the Holiest in 1657. The bell tower, with a quadrangular shape, dates to 1592, while the Baroque cloister was built in the early 18th century. The main façade and the baptisteries are from 1915 to 1934, designed by Alexandre Soler i March, after an idea by Antoni Gaudí.

== Overview ==
The church has a nave and two far narrower aisles, divided by eighteen octagonal pilasters, crowned by capitals with vegetable motifs. There is no transept. The interior has few decorations, with the exception of the large polychrome windows.

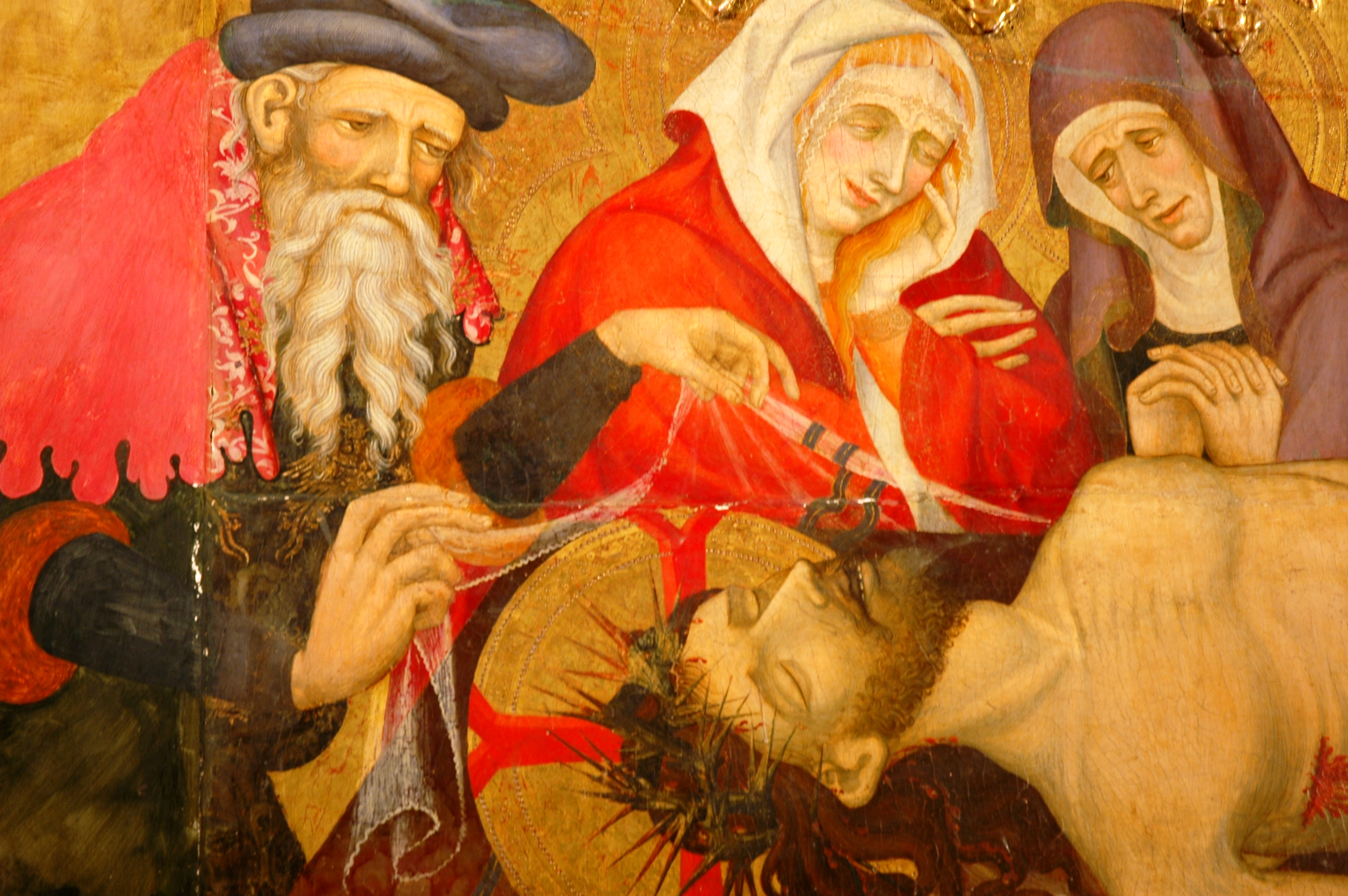
Detail of the altarpiece of the Holy Spirit.

Works of art include the following altarpieces:

- St. Mark, by Arnau Bassa (1346)
- Holy Spirit, by Pere Serra (1394), considered amongst the best examples of Catalan painting in the 14th century
- St. Michael and St. Nicholas, by Jaume Cabrera (1406)
- Holy Trinity, a late work by Gabriel Guàrdia (1501)

There is also a painting by Lluís Borrassà (1411).
