= Lluís Borrassà =

Spanish painter

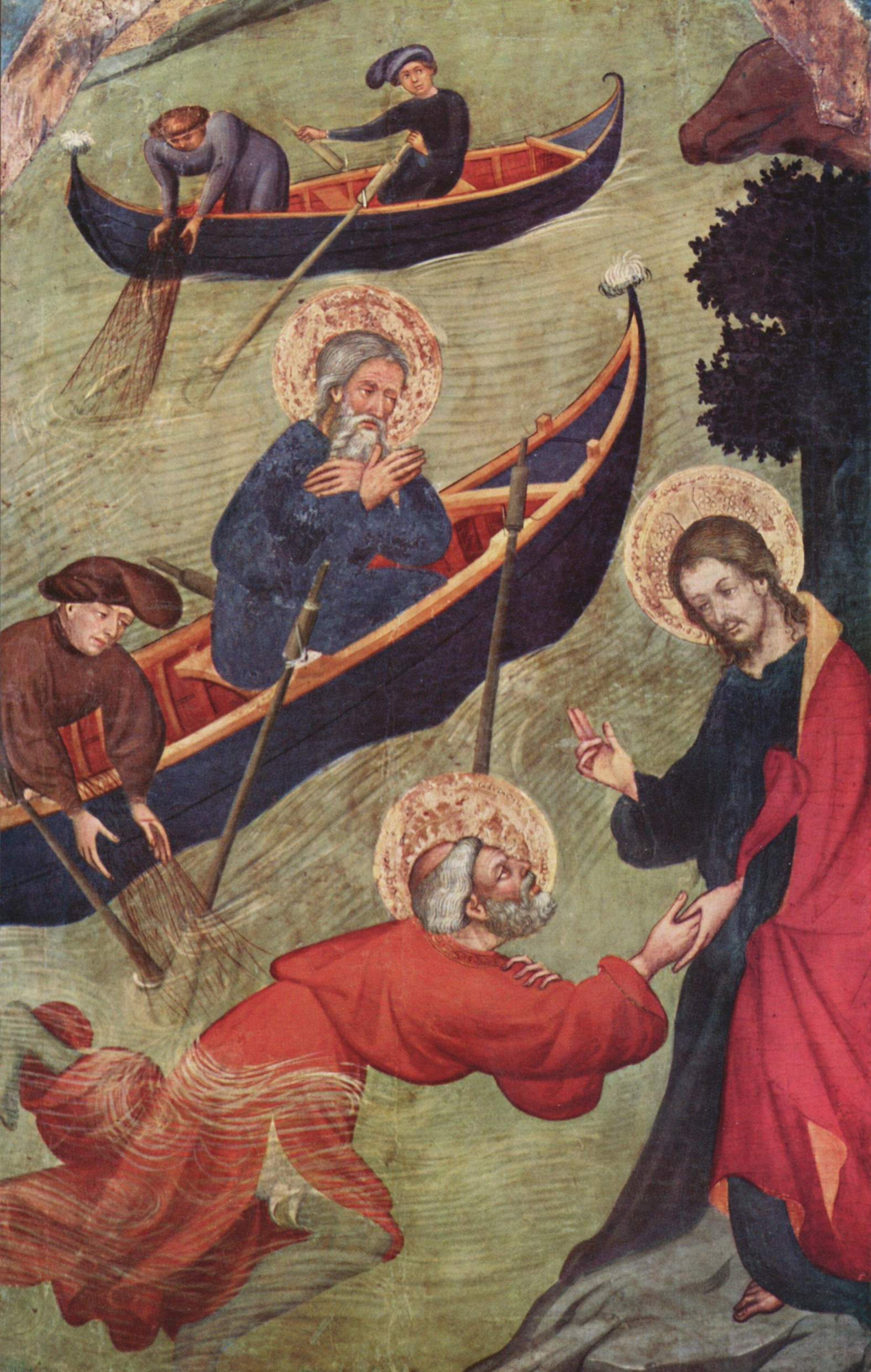
St. Peter's Altar, c. 1411

Lluís Borrassà (c.1360, Girona? - c.1426, Barcelona?) was a Catalan painter. He was employed by the Crown of Aragon and is widely considered to have introduced the International Gothic painting style into the Principality of Catalonia.

== Life & work ==
He learned painting from his father, Honorat Borrassà, and is first documented in 1380 as a member of the court of John I of Aragon, who was known for bringing prominent artists there. In 1390, he set up a workshop in Barcelona that would be the city's largest until 1420. His style was influenced by Ferrer Bassa and, in turn, influenced Bernat Martorell.

His production included numerous narrative-style altarpieces. One that he created for the convent church of St. Damien was often praised. although it has since disappeared. Other notable works included pieces depicting the Archangel Gabriel for Barcelona Cathedral; one with the Virgin Mary and St. George for the convent church of St. Francis in Vilafranca del Penedès; and a Clare of Assisi for the convent of the Poor Clares.

Also notable is a Burial of Jesus for the predella at the Collegiate Church of Santa María in Manresa, from 1408. His last positively identified work is from 1425. Few of his polyptychs have survived intact.
