= Pere Serra =

Spanish painter

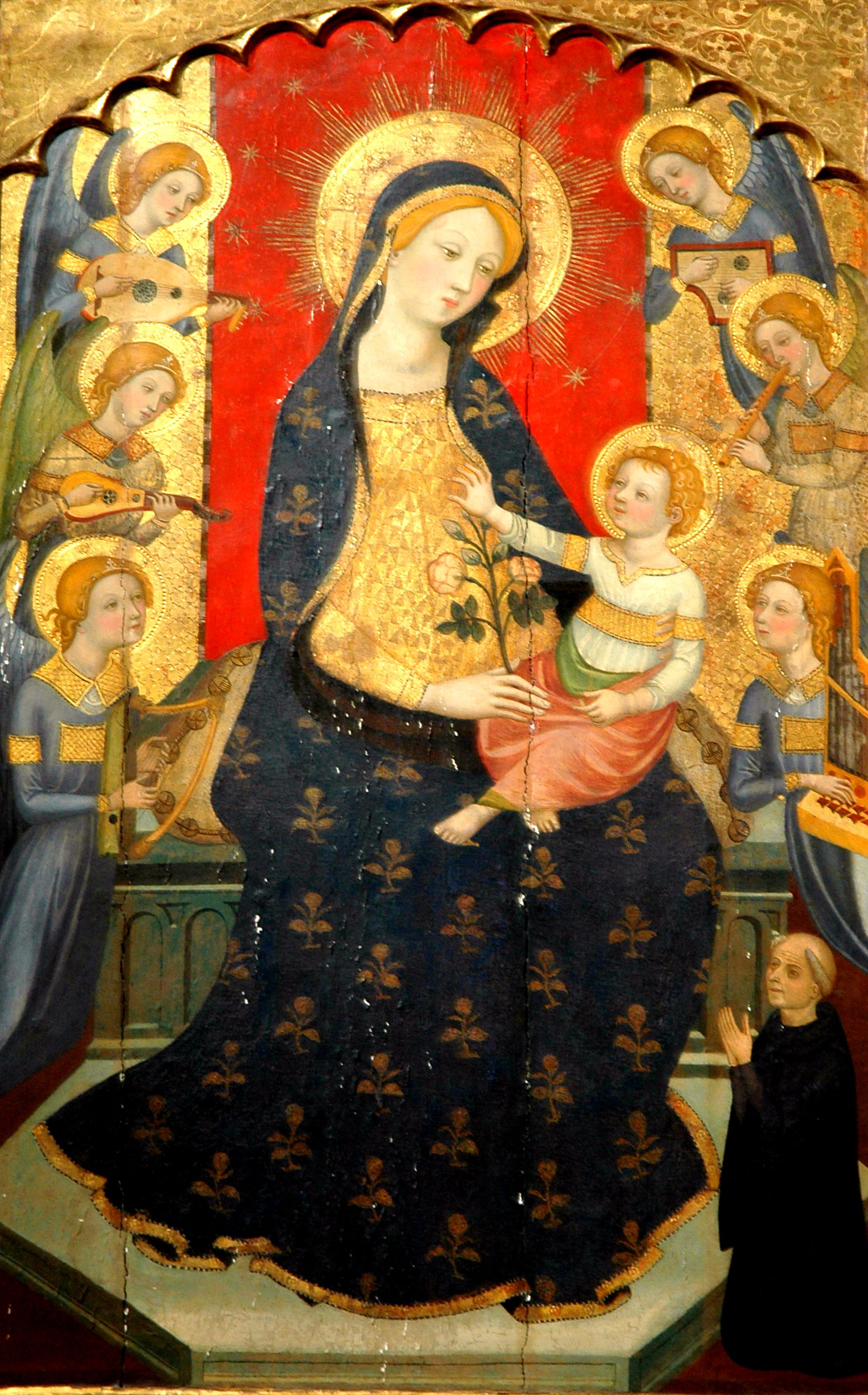
Detail of the retablo of All Saints, Monastery of Sant Cugat.

Pere Serra was a painter in Gothic-Italian style, who was active in Catalonia in 1357–1406.

He was born into a family of painters, including his brothers Jaume, Francesc and Joan. Like most of the Catalan painters of the period, he was influenced by the contemporary Italian painting, especially from Siena. He entered the workshop of Ramón Destorrents in 1357 and, together with his brothers, painted the altarpiece of the monastery of Santa María de Sigena, now in the Museu Nacional d'Art de Catalunya in Barcelona.

Other works from Pere Serra include the Arrival of the Holy Spirit in the cathedral of Manresa (1394), considered his masterwork, an altarpiece with Saints in the Monastery of Sant Cugat (1375), a Virgin with Six Musician Angels, and Annunciation in the Pinacoteca di Brera in Milan.

== Sources ==
- Azcárate Ristori, J. M. de (1986). "Pintura gótica del siglo XV". Historia del arte. Madrid: Anaya. ISBN 84-207-1408-9.
