= Ferrer Bassa =

Spanish painter

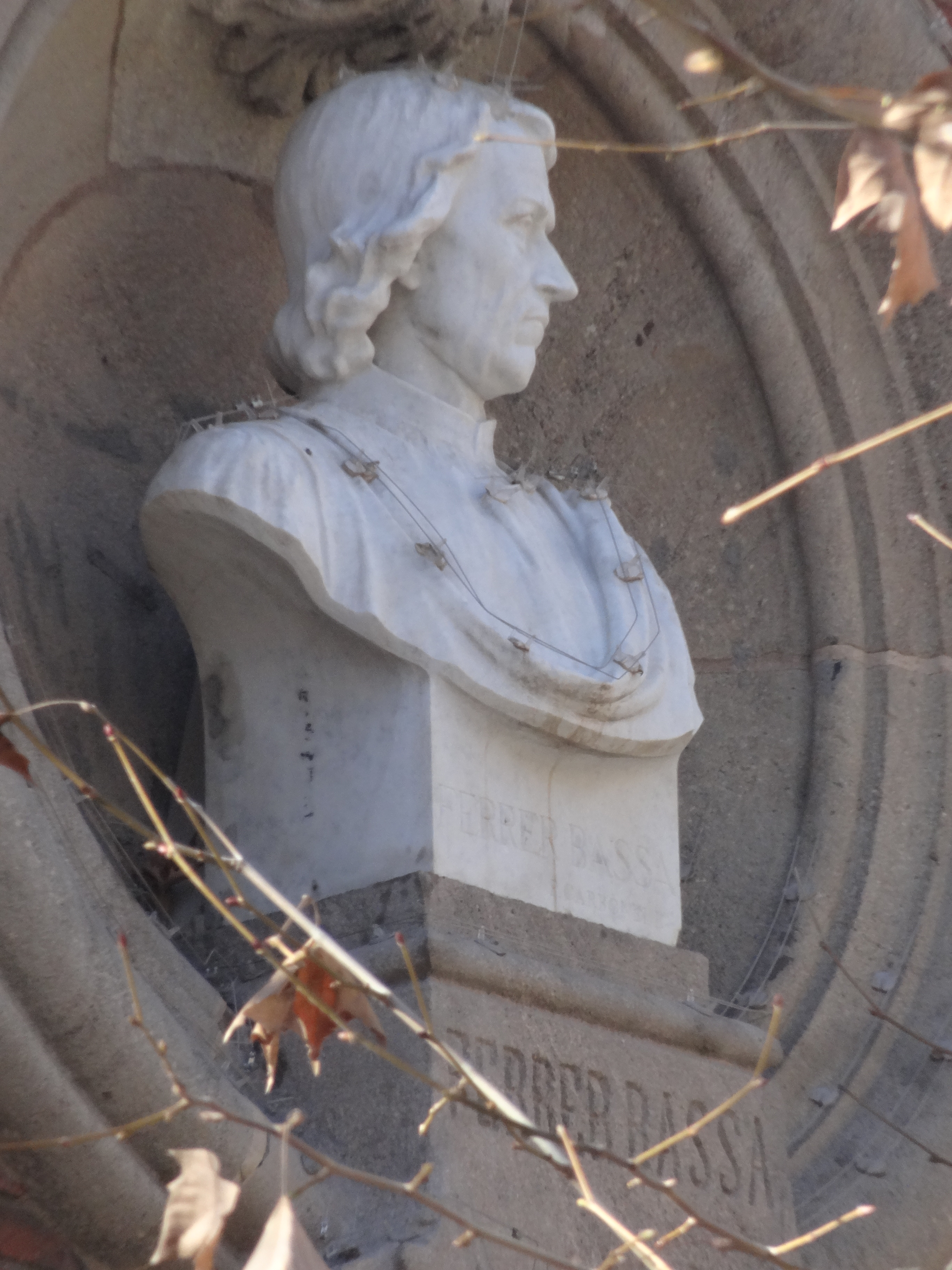
- Bust of Jaume Ferrer Bassa
- Born: c.1285 Avinyonet del Penedès ?, Crown of Aragon
- Died: 1348; Barcelona, Crown of Aragon
- Known for: Painting, Miniature
- Movement: Gothic art

Ferrer Bassa (c. 1285 – 1348) was a Catalan Gothic painter and miniaturist.

== Biography ==
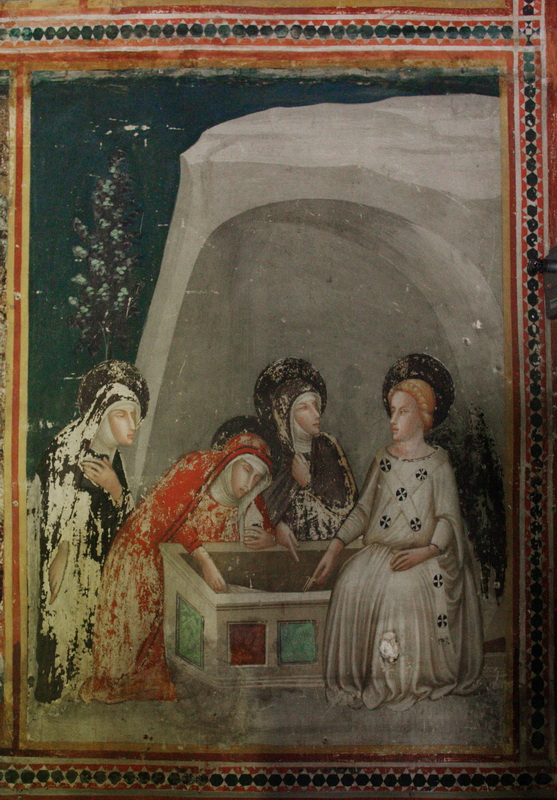
The Three Women at the Tomb of Jesus by Bassa, in the Monastery of Pedralbes, Barcelona.

He was active in the early 14th century, as proved by two documents which attest him working in two chapels at Sitges. Ten years later he worked for Alfonso IV of Aragon, executing miniatures for the manuscripts of the Uses of Barcelona and the Costumes of Catalonia, showing a strong French and Sienese influence. His production increased during the reign of Peter IV of Aragon, especially under royal commissions, such as the Christ and the Virgin in royal chapel of Barcelona (1344).

His main surviving work is the series of wall paintings in the St. Michael Chapel in the Monastery of Pedralbes. It includes some twenty scenes basing on two main themes: the Passion of Christ and the Seven Pains of the Virgin, showing Giottesque influences, as well as from Duccio di Buoninsegna and Ambrogio Lorenzetti.

He has been attributed with the main role in the Catalan phase of the Great Canterbury Psalter. Also attributed to Bassa are a Coronation of the Virgin in the church of Bellpuig and a St. Bernard in the museum of Vich. His son Arnau was also a painter and collaborated with his father on several works. They both died of plague in 1348.

== See also ==
- Jaume Cascalls

== Sources ==
- Lafuente Ferreri, E. Historia de la pintura española (in Spanish). Biblioteca Básica Salvat.
